= Licavoli =

Licavoli is a surname, likely of Italian origin. Notable people with the surname include:

- James T. Licavoli (1904–1985), American mobster
- Peter Licavoli (1902–1984), American organized crime figure
- Thomas Licavoli (1904–1973), American gangster and bootlegger
