= Shondor Birns =

American gangster (1905–1975)

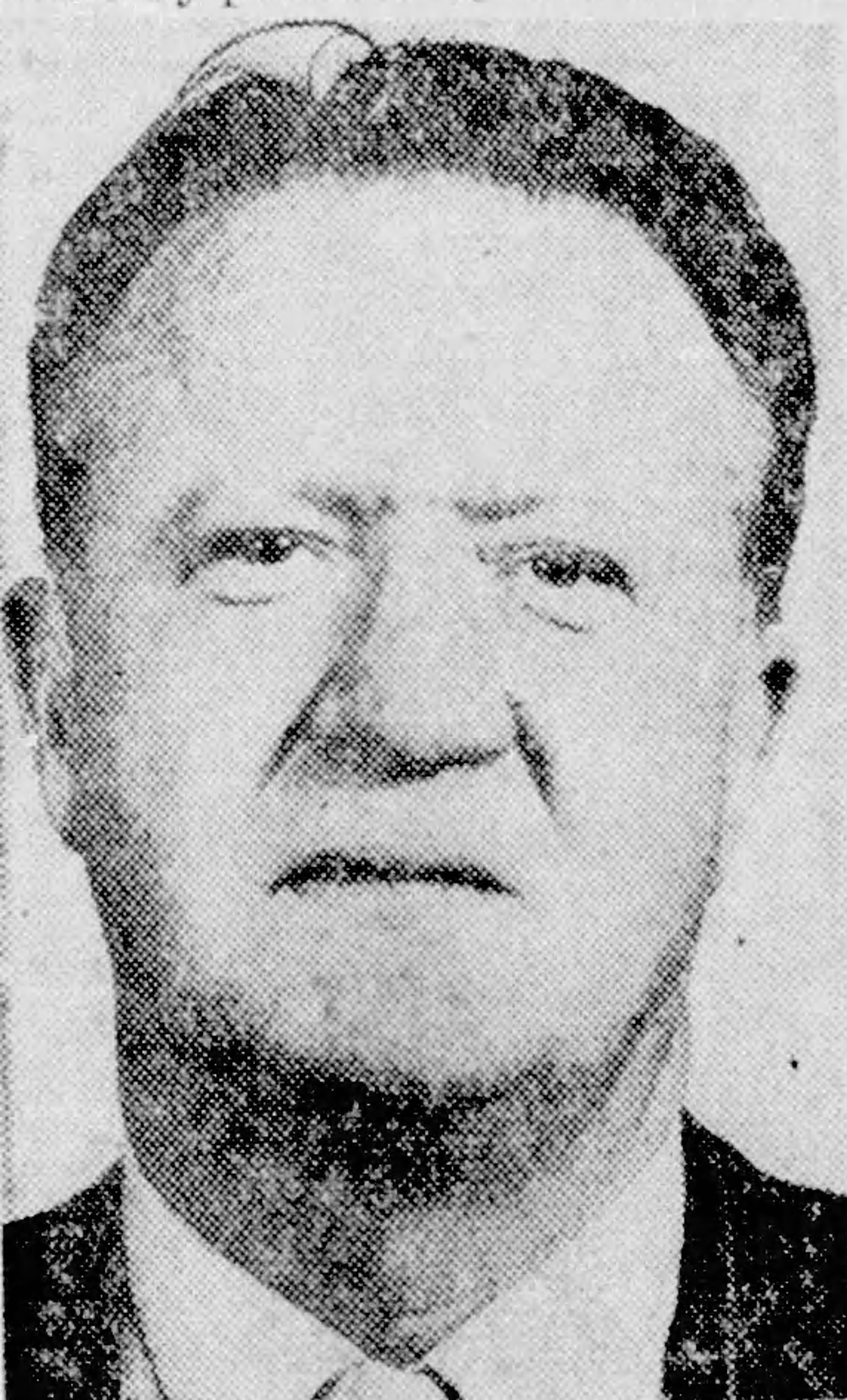
- Birns in 1957
- Born: February 21, 1905; Lemes, Austria-Hungary
- Died: March 29, 1975 (aged 70); Cleveland, Ohio, United States
- Cause of death: Murder (car bomb)
- Other names: Alexander Birnstein, Alex Birns

Alex Birns (February 21, 1905 – March 29, 1975), best known as Shondor Birns, was an American gangster and crime boss who was a leading figure of the Jewish Mob in Cleveland, Ohio, between the 1930s and 1970s. Once labeled by the local newspapers as the city's "Public enemy No. 1", Birns was actively involved in a wide variety of racketeering and other organized crime related activities such as prostitution, theft, and numbers, from the days of Prohibition until his death in a car bombing in 1975, which is often attributed as a hit put onto Danny Greene.

== Early life ==
Birns was born in Lemes, in the Sáros section of the Kingdom of Hungary in Austria-Hungary which later went to Czechoslovakia after the Treaty of Trianon. His birth name is given as either Szandor Birnstein or Sándor Birn, while his birth year is reported between 1905 and 1907. A commonly given birth date is February 21, 1905, but his age given during his 1907 immigration into the United States was stated as ten months, indicating a birthdate in May 1906.

Birns' parents were Hungarian Jews Hermann and lllona "Illon" Birn, who entered the U.S. via Ellis Island on the S.S. Chemnitz with Birns and two siblings on March 18, 1907. His first name was Americanized to Alex, the abbreviated form of Alexander, which is the English equivalent of his original name. By the time Birns was one year old, the family had settled in Cleveland, Ohio, residing in the Woodland Avenue neighborhood. Italian and Jewish neighbors took to calling the boy "Shondor", an approximation of the way most Americans would pronounce "Sándor", and the name stuck, with close family and friends calling him "Shon". Newspapers most commonly referred to him as "Alex 'Shondor' Birns".

Birns attended Outhwaite School (now Alfred A. Bensch Elementary) and later Kennard Junior High School, where he was noted as an exceptional athlete by age thirteen, excelling at baseball, basketball, and swimming. He regularly attended the Council Educational Alliance, a recreational youth center for working class immigrant children. Birns was reportedly known for his toughness and competitive nature since childhood. A former schoolmate recalled an incident in which Birns had missed a marble-shooting game, where the winner was awarded a medal. When Birns returned to school the day after, he went to the boy who had won the tournament and snatched away his medal, telling the boy and those present, "See? I would have won it anyway if I was here".

Like many families, the Birns family struggled to earn a living in the New World, and during Prohibition, they turned to bootlegging, taking in a small still from Cleveland Mafia boss Joe Lonardo to supplement their income and better provide for their children. On November 9, 1920, Birns' mother was tending to the 10-gallon still in their apartment, when a faulty gas connection caused an explosion. Her clothing caught fire and was engulfed in flames. She ran outside screaming, where a passing motorist helped extinguish the flames and drove her to the hospital. Horribly burned over 75 percent of her body, she died the next morning. As Birns' father was arrested for bootlegging in wake of his wife's death, 13-year-old Birns was sheltered for a time in the old Jewish orphanage. He grew up quickly, and took a job as a newspaper boy during the tough circulation wars. Later on, he lived with his grandmother.

After briefly attending East Technical High School, Birns dropped out of school after completing 10th grade at Longwood Commerce High School in 1922. He enlisted in the United States Navy in 1923, but was discharged six months later because he was underage. According to his stepmother, he spent some time homeless, occasionally selling newspapers while supporting himself and some family members through bootlegging and theft.

== Criminal career ==
On the streets, Birns developed a reputation as a fierce fighter, proving himself quick with his fists in many fights with street thugs. It was at roughly this time that he added the "s" to his surname to "spare his family embarrassment through association with his criminal repute".

Then his major brushes with the law began. Birns was prolific in his criminal activities, having several stacks of arrest records that are currently located in the Cuyahoga County Archives. Birns was convicted of car theft on November 14, 1925, for which he served 18 months in the Mansfield Reformatory. He soon acquired an assault conviction in which Birns broke the jaw of a motorist who had taken too long to make his turn in front of Birns. With 18 arrests in a 12-year period, Birns was on his way to notoriety in northeast Ohio. During this period, he gloried in his fame and enjoyed the attention which he received from local law enforcement as well as fellow gangsters. He soon developed a knack for beating legal charges.

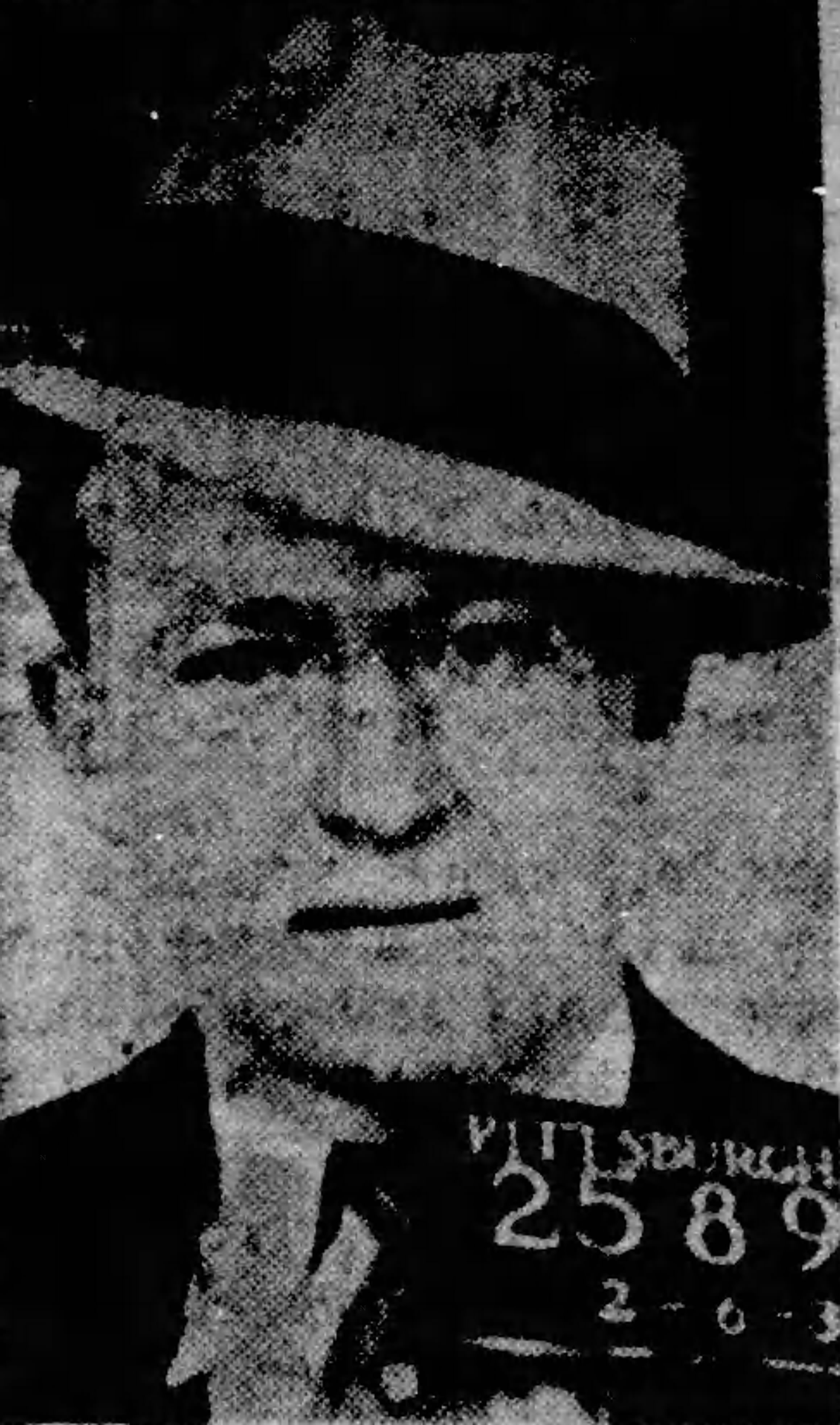
A 1932 mug shot of Birns

During this period, he was successfully prosecuted only twice. At the age of 19, Birns was convicted of auto theft and served two years in prison. In 1933, he was convicted of bribery, served 60 days and paid a $500 fine. After six appearances in court, a prosecutor remarked, "It is time the court put away this man whose reputation is one of rampant criminality." Birns was only in his twenties.

=== Association with the Maxie Diamond gang ===
Birns was soon recruited by Maxie Diamond, leader of the E. 55th street and Woodland Mob. Diamond was an associate of Teamster leader William Presser and was once referred to by the local newspapers as "Cleveland's Number One Racketeer". Birns became a ranking member of Diamond's gang during the battles for control of the city's dry cleaners and launderers.

In 1933, shortly after he hooked up with the Maxie Diamond gang, Diamond narrowly escaped death from gunfire by rival gangsters in what was called by the police, "a continuation of the city's dry cleaning racket war". Birns was among those picked up for questioning. He was released, but only after paying $2 for two overdue traffic tickets.

Later in the year, Birns was once again arrested by the police. In separate incidents in quick succession, two men were shot from the same passing car. Police called it "continuation of guerrilla warfare among policy game racketeers. They picked up Birns for interrogation along with five of his fellow henchmen." Birns and three others were charged with manslaughter but were acquitted. Four days later, Birns, along with co-defendant Yale Cohen and attorney Max Lesnick, were convicted of bribing a witness. It was, The Plain Dealer said, "one of the few cases on record in which men identified by police as 'gangsters' were convicted of anything." The judge sentenced them to 60 days in the Warrensville Workhouse.

While serving his sentence at the Warrensville Workhouse after being convicted for the bribery charges, Birns granted his first newspaper interview. Birns told the reporter that he was serving his time happily and enjoying the hard work. In the years to come, he became close to many of the city's newspaper reporters and could sometimes be found chatting with one over a cocktail. To them, he was an excellent source of news tips. He was soon labeled as "Cleveland's Public Enemy No. 1" by the local press.

=== The Rudy Duncan hit ===
One of Birns's most serious arrests was for the 1934 murder of Rudy Duncan, a 36-year-old night club bouncer at Euclid Avenue's Keystone Club. Birns was sitting at Keystone with two of his fellow gang members when he rose to retrieve some cigars from his overcoat which he had checked in the coat room. Birns had misplaced his cheque and could not produce it when asked for it by the coatroom girl. The coatroom girl subsequently refused to give Birns access to his coat. Over her objections, Birns entered the coatroom, shoving her aside in the process, and retrieved some cigars from his coat. He then returned to the table, had two more drinks, and smoked one cigar.

The coatroom girl ran outside and summoned Rudy Duncan, the bouncer who also happened to be her live-in boyfriend. She told him about the incident with Birns. Duncan was a former boxer with arrests in Pittsburgh, Buffalo, and Cleveland, and had experienced previous run-ins with Birns and his gang.

Duncan came up behind him and in a menacing manner, demanded an explanation as to Birns's presence in the Club. Birns muttered something and the two lunged at each other. In the ensuing ruckus, two shots were fired. One hit Birns in the shoulder and the other hit one of Birns's friends in the leg. Duncan ordered Birns's crew out of the bar at gunpoint.

When the police arrived, they found Birns in his car ready to pull away, while holding a bloody handkerchief to his shoulder. They searched his car and confiscated a revolver which he had placed in his glove box. He denied ownership of the gun and would not reveal who shot him. The police drove him to the hospital. After two days, Birns checked himself out of the hospital and was well on his way to a full recovery when he was arrested and charged with carrying a concealed weapon. During the trial, Birns testified that he did not see his assailant and that whoever came up behind him in the cloakroom had the gun. He refused to identify Duncan as the man who shot him. He denied even knowing Duncan at all. Likewise, Duncan's recollection of the incident was so vague that he was not even called to testify as a witness.

Two months later, Rudy Duncan took his 11-year-old foster son, Stanley to a movie show at the Uptown theater outside E. 105th Street and Saint Clair Avenue. Afterwards, they walked to a confectionery for ice cream. When they got into their car back in the theater parking lot, two men wearing white cotton gloves walked up alongside, one on each side. With a terrified Stanley crouching in the seat, they fired five bullets into Duncan. Police immediately began a search for Birns. They found him, but they could not find evidence to tie him to the murder. He was released. Duncan's murder went officially unsolved.

=== Rise to power ===
Birns' reputation as a brutal, ruthless enforcer made it easy for him to establish lucrative "protection" services. Legal businesses who wished to be allowed to operate undisturbed had to pay him as a labor consultant. Those who refused to pay would usually find their store windows broken or their cars blown up. In any event, those who initially refused would soon pay up.

During the late 1930s, Birns became heavily involved in extorting protection money from whorehouses, or "vice resorts" as they were dubbed by the media. With the backing of the Cleveland crime family, Birns operated freely. Many of Birns's clients were judges, politicians and police officers of high rank. They would serve as important contacts for him in the future and vice versa. In 1938, Birns visited Canada for a vacation. Upon his re-entry to the United States, he was questioned briefly about his criminal history and answered honestly. At the time, Birns was unaware of the Immigration Act of 1917 which required any alien convicted of a crime of moral turpitude to gain permission prior to entering or leaving the country. It would take a couple of years of paperwork to catch up.

In 1942, at the height of World War II, Birns was arrested on a deportation warrant based on the auto theft and bribery convictions. During his incarceration, Birns tried to enlist in the United States Army. However, this was to no avail. Two years later, his attorney was successful in getting him released on bond. However, officials were determined to keep Birns locked up. A wartime executive order was issued by Franklin Delano Roosevelt charging Birns as an enemy alien and he was interned at McAlester, Oklahoma. This greatly offended Birns. Although he had never applied for American citizenship, Birns always considered himself a patriotic American.

Upon his release in 1944, Birns returned to Cleveland and was well known by the police, judges and the public. He was regarded as a celebrity gangster and had many public sympathizers in what was generally seen as a vendetta.

=== Restaurateur ===
During this time, Birns was building a profitable legitimate business as a restaurateur. He opened his Ten-Eleven Club at 1011 Chester Avenue in Downtown Cleveland. It was a popular nightspot which had a reputation for serving excellent food. The restaurant was usually frequented by local and out-of-town big shots. Police and newspaper reporters ate and drank on the house. When the tragic Cleveland East Ohio Gas Explosion that killed 134 persons and left thousands homeless occurred in 1944, Birns kept the club open, 24 hours a day, feeding policemen, firemen and rescue workers for free.

His Alhambra Tavern on the East Side was another popular restaurant. By law, convicted felons were not supposed to be legally able to get liquor licenses. Birns managed to bypass that by disguising his connections to the Alhambra. At one point, he was simply its "public relations director". The Cleveland safety director denounced the deal in which the state okayed Birns's license as "stinking to high heaven of politics".

=== Muscling in the numbers operations and policy games ===
During the 1940s, Birns made a longstanding alliance and had become closely involved with the local Cleveland crime family mobsters such as Angelo Lonardo. Lonardo had already taken over the "black lottery" and numbers operations. Birns was determined to firmly keep this traditionally Afro-American racket under his control.

One of the best known African-American organized crime figures was Don King, the future boxing promoter, at the time more commonly known as Donald "The Kid" King. According to a 1988 Plains Dealer series by Christopher Evans, "King was flamboyant — always seen with a .38 in his belt and a big cigar in his mouth". In the mid-1960s, King and his partner, a Cleveland prize-fighter named Virgil Ogletree were reportedly grossing $15,000 a day on policy. King first gained a reputation prominence in 1954, after he thwarted an attempted armed robbery on one of his gambling houses, by killing one of the stick-up men. The shooting was deemed a justifiable homicide.

In October 1956, Birns sent an emissary to King and his colleagues demanding that they pay $200 a week as street tax, or suffer the consequences. They initially agreed but by December deemed the price too high. King eventually began holding out on the protection money being paid on a regular basis to Birns, Lonardo and their associates.

At 3:45 a.m. on the morning of May 23, 1957, an explosion ripped apart the front porch of King's house. Uninjured, he went to the police and accused Birns of ordering the bombing. King also informed police of his decision to get out of illegal gambling. Largely on King's testimony, Birns and the others were indicted. A few weeks later, Birns attempted to prevent King from testifying by sending men to kill him at his home. King was ambushed outside his house. Several pellets of shot hit him in the back of his head, but King survived.

At the trial, King testified to jurors that Birns' emissary had offered him $10,000 not to testify: "He said if I didn't testify, he would guarantee there would be no more shooting at me or bombing my house and I'd have no reason to be scared no more." The prosecution even produced a surprise witness, Dollree Mapp, who was a former employee of the rackets. On the stand, the Press reported, "she burst into tears again and again and refused to answer questions as Birns and the other defendants glared at her. Her attorney told the judge she was told that she and her 12-year-old daughter would be killed if she testified." Elijah Abercrombie, a co-defendant, told the jury that police had offered to let him run an unhampered gambling game if he gave them information against Birns. Defense lawyer Fred Garmone called King "a scheming, lying, witness-fixing extortionist himself".

When the trial began, King was cast as the star witness in the trial. The judge and jury had difficulty understanding King and his rapid, inarticulate speech leading the local newspapers to dub him "The Talker". The jury deliberated 11 hours and the trial resulted in Birns' and the other defendants' acquittals.

=== Relationship with law enforcement ===
Throughout his lifetime, Alex Birns craved respectability and sought to obtain it through his popular Alhambra Restaurant, where many judges and politicians dined. During the early morning hours, Birns would often send food over to the nearby Fifth District police station for the police officers working the late shift.

In spite of being diligently pursued by law enforcement for most of his life, Birns eventually came to respect and admire the city's police officers. Once, when he was under a 24-hour surveillance, Birns was leaving a Cleveland Indians baseball game. He happened to notice the two detectives assigned to follow him and flagged them over. The officers agreed to drive him to his next destination. When the officers were reprimanded by a superior, Birns intervened on their behalf.

In 1959, Birns physically assaulted a police officer. He was convicted of assault and battery and was once again sent to the Warrensville Workhouse for nine months. He practically ran the place. The superintendent was later fired for the liberties he allowed Birns.

While in prison, Alex Birns was accused of masterminding the car bombing of numbers operator, Joe Allen, in an attempt to shake him down for 25 percent of his operation. The state tried Birns twice for the crime. A workhouse guard admitted to having acted as a go-between in trying to arrange a deal with Allen. The outcome of the first trial was a hung jury. The second acquitted him. Upon his acquittal, Birns blew kisses to the jury. The Cleveland Press published the story on the front page, with the headline, "Who runs this town — Birns or the Law?".

The relentless prosecutors, however, did not give up and accused Birns of trying to contact a juror in the second case. He said he had merely asked an Alhambra waitress to see if the juror would be fair to him. Ten of the jurors signed a statement protesting the charge that they had been unduly influenced.

=== Assassination attempt ===
In 1959, Birns was shot at by an unknown assailant as he arrived home. The gunman missed, whereupon Birns cruised the neighborhood on the lookout for him. Upon investigation, Cleveland police picked up for interrogation a small-time hood named Clarence "Sonny" Coleman, who owed money to Birns. Colman was released soon after questioning. A short time afterward, Coleman was shot on a neighborhood street shortly after midnight. Three bullets hit him, but he managed to run up to the front porch of a house yelling, "Let me in, baby, let me in!" In the hospital, he told police the shooter was a man in the back seat of a car driven by Shondor Birns. Birns was arrested and brought to the booking window at Central Station.

A month later, Coleman changed his mind and told police that he had only speculated that it was Birns in the car. However, the police arrested Coleman as a material witness. He changed his mind again and reluctantly agreed to testify. At the trial, a neighbor backed Birns's alibi. He said he saw Birns arrive home at 12:07 a.m., about the time of the shooting several miles away. It took the jurors four hours to reach a verdict, which resulted in Birns's acquittal. They expressed their refusal to believe the changing testimony of Coleman, who had been a dope peddler and police informant. Police predicted what the press called "a fresh outbreak of shootings and violence in Cleveland's multi-million-dollar numbers racket".

=== Mervin Gold murder ===
Birns had been suspected of two murders, including that of a financier named Mervin Gold. In the 1960s, Gold was being investigated for using stolen Canadian bonds for using a bank loan. On July 8, 1963, he was found murdered and stuck in the trunk of his car. He had been beaten, strangled with a clothesline and shot in the chest. A blanket was wrapped around his head. He was shot three more times in the skull. The coroner, Samuel Gerber, estimated his time of death as shortly before midnight Friday.

Anticipating an untimely demise, Gold left behind an affidavit claiming that Birns had given him the bonds. His wife told police that Gold was on his way to meet with Birns the night he was murdered. Police also found a tape made by Gold of a phone call between himself and Birns. A pickup order was sent out for Birns. On Monday his car turned up outside a motel in Toledo. The motel owner said he had checked in Saturday and sought treatment for an injured right hand. He told the doctor a firecracker caused the injury.

On Wednesday morning, Birns called John Kocevar, chief deputy Cuyahoga County sheriff. He arranged to surrender at a meeting spot in suburban Garfield Heights. He told Kocevar, "I would have surrendered yesterday, but it was a Jewish holiday." Somebody also tipped off the press. A reporter and photograph were waiting when he arrived. Birns told them, "Thanks for coming, fellows."

Birns was taken to Central Station for questioning by the head of the Homicide Unit, Lieutenant Carl Delau. Amid aggressive interrogation by Delau, Birns insisted he had been dining on frog legs in a Garfield Heights steakhouse at the night of Gold's murder. Birns claimed that he was at home with a woman of fine character. He did not name her, but said she was willing to testify for him. His bail was set at $50,000, which he posted with ease.

Then, the Plain Dealer reported, "Birns cocked his summer straw hat, waved goodbye to reporters, walked out of the building and down the front steps to where his attorney, James R. Willis, was waiting." All concerned were shocked when two days later, Birns produced Allene Leonards, a shy, 24-year-old teacher in the Garfield Heights school system who confirmed his alibi claiming that she had been with Birns the whole night. This was also confirmed by the owner. Birns would later divorce his first wife, Jane, and marry Leonards a year later. He had married Jane in 1952, and had one son, Michael (died 1978), with her.

=== Self-appointed peacemaker and mediator of disputes ===
In the 1960s, Birns was having trouble with some Afro-American numbers operators. It was during this time that he came into contact with a brash, ambitious, young Irish-American upstart named Danny Greene. Impressed with his fearless attitude and abilities, Birns hired Greene to be an enforcer for his various numbers operators. It was a decision which Birns would eventually regret.

For a relatively small cut of their profits, $1,000 weekly, Birns had been serving as a peacemaker and mediator of disputes among the Afro-Americans. He also laid off or distributed big bets to other cities like Pittsburgh, so no single operator lost too much if a number came up. In 1968, after a massive investigation into his assets by the Internal Revenue Service, Birns was convicted and sent to federal prison for lying about his assets.

=== The 1970s ===
By the 1970s, Alex Birns had mellowed significantly, playing handball daily and spending several hours on lunch and a cocktail or two. He did not want any more trouble. He promised his parole officer, "Kid, I don't break any provisions of parole. I'll tell you why. If I go back to jail, I'll die there."

More often, Birns chose to lunch at the Theatrical on the Short Vincent, where he always sat at the end of the bar. Birns once told a reporter, "If I'm the city's biggest crook, why do they all want to be my friend? I'll tell you why. Most of them are worse than I am, and they all know that I know...."

After lunch, he would head out to the Silver Quill or Christie's Lounge to chat with the owner and the barmaid and sometimes buy drinks for the regulars. By this time, he was planning to retire and live out his twilight years in Florida. However, when longtime Cleveland family boss, John Scalish died, Birns teamed up with the faction backing James T. Licavoli as the new boss.

=== Opposition from Afro-American racketeers ===
Birns was always dealing with heavy opposition from a few Afro-American gangsters who wanted independence from him and the more powerful and politically connected Mafiosi of the Cleveland family. Several close murder attempts led Birns to buy a Doberman Pinscher to protect his home. In February, Birns and his girlfriend were walking downtown when a car with several Afro-American men drove by. Two shots were fired, but neither Birns nor his girlfriend were hit.

Several months later, Birns walked into an east side bar in response to a meeting requested by several Afro-American numbers racketeers. This time, Birns brought his heavily armed Afro-American bodyguard along in anticipation of trouble. Upon arrival, Birns and his bodyguard were immediately accosted by several of the numbers men. One of the gangsters shouted, "We want you out of the business or you're dead", while pulling back his coat to reveal a pistol in his waistband. The bodyguard reacted quickly, leveling a small sub-machine gun from under his overcoat. Some customers scurried towards the exits. The group continued shouting at Birns as he and his bodyguard cautiously backed out of the bar and left.

=== Conflict with Danny Greene ===
The relationship between Irish mob boss Danny Greene and Alex Birns also began to sour. Greene envied Birns's control of the rackets and looked forward to the day when it would be his. He was also jealous of Birns's immense wealth and celebrity status with the Cleveland media and public. The death of boss John Scalish had put Birns and Greene on opposite sides of a Mafia succession dispute with Greene supporting mobbed up labor union leader John Nardi and Birns supporting caporegime James T. Licavoli. Greene was soon willing to take on Birns.

Greene had requested from Birns a loan of $75,000. Greene wanted the money to set up a "cheat spot", a speakeasy and gambling house. Therefore, Birns arranged the loan for Greene through the Gambino family. Somehow the money wound up in the hands of Billy Cox, a numbers operator, who used it to purchase narcotics. The police raided his house, arrested him, seized the narcotics and what was left of the $75,000. The Gambino family, from whom Birns had borrowed the loan, wanted their money paid back. Birns pressed Greene but Greene flatly refused to pay; instead asserting that it was not his fault that it got lost. Birns, known for his ruthless enforcement of debts, demanded repayment and threatened Greene. The situation escalated when Birns placed a bounty on Greene's head, offering money to anyone who would kill him.

In retaliation, Birns gave $25,000 to an associate to hire a hit man for Greene to be murdered, especially in the event of any harm befalling him. This contract was soon taken by several minor underworld characters who were burglars by trade, which would result in numerous failed assassination attempts on Greene.

Not long after, Greene found an unexploded bomb in his car when he pulled into a Collinwood service station for gas. The explosive was wired improperly and failed to detonate. Greene disassembled the bomb himself, removed the dynamite, and brought the rest of the package to the Cleveland Police Department Lieutenant Edward Kovacic. Lt. Kovacic offered Greene police protection, but he refused. He also refused to hand over the bomb, telling him, "I'm going to send this back to the old bastard that sent it to me."

== Assassination ==
In March 1975, Holy Saturday, the eve of Easter, Birns was blown up via a bomb containing C-4, a potent military explosive, in the lot behind Christy's Lounge, the former Jack & Jill West Lounge, a go-go spot at 2516 Detroit Ave. Birns was blown several feet through the roof of the car and his torso landed near the passenger door. A man who walked Birns to his car braved flames and smoke and located him near the car. Apparently, Birns was still alive, though barely. The man only managed to drag away Birns's upper torso. His face, arms and chest were bloodied and blackened. Birns' nose was broken when his body landed on the street after being blown out the top of his car. His hair was scorched off from the heat of the blast. Birns had been blown in half. His severed legs landed fifty feet away and other smaller parts of him were scattered all over the place. Towards his death, the upper part of his body was convulsing violently. A chain link fence between Christy's and St. Malachi Church caught many of the smaller fragments of flesh and bone. At first glance, they resembled steaming pieces of meat. Birns' age at death was given as 69 or 70.

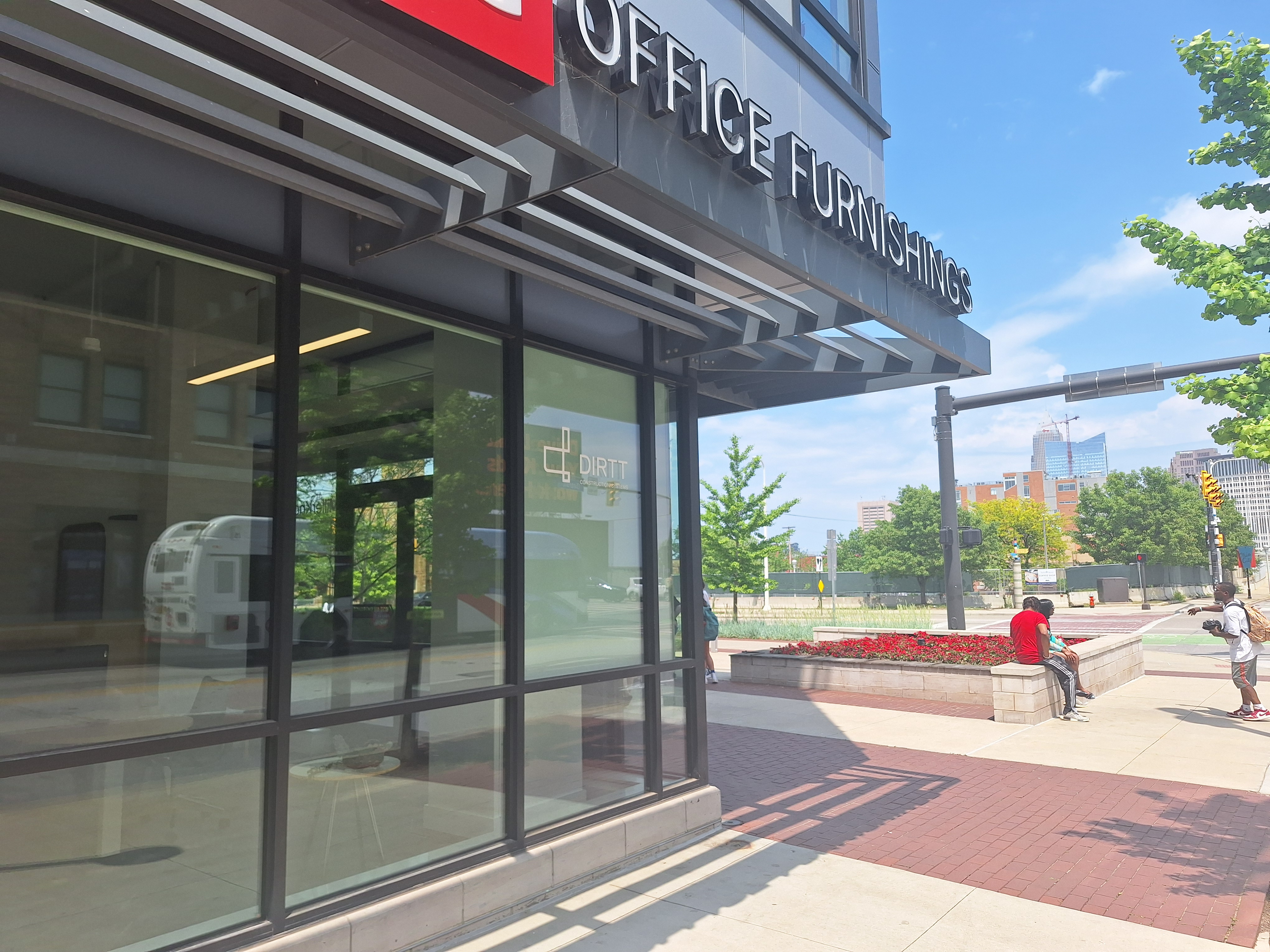
Corner at 2516 Detroit Ave where Birns was killed in 1975.

Though Birns's Lincoln was demolished and smoking heavily, his state-of-the-art burglar system survived. A leather gym bag and gym shoes had been blown from the trunk. Amazingly, a paper bag of clothing from inside his car survived. It read: "Diamond's of Ohio - Fashions for men which women love". Police said the blast was among the most powerful they had ever investigated. Police and bomb squad members worked an entire day examining the bombing scene. Coroners workers spent hours collecting as many pieces of skin and bones that they could find. A total of $843 in cash was found on or around Birns's body. The Internal Revenue Service promptly claimed the money to be put toward back taxes that Birns owed.

=== Aftermath ===
In the following weeks, homicide investigators wrongly concentrated African-American organized crime as suspects rather than Danny Greene. On the suspected involvement of Afro-American crime figures in his murder, one Afro-American bookie responded, "It's dumb to talk about blacks doing Shondor. Shon wasn't no bad fella. He was white but it didn't make no difference. Shon had a black soul. He was black through and through. Shit, there wasn't no racial prejudice in that goddamn Shondor Birns at all. He was a helluva guy.... No, No. There ain't gonna be no more Shondors...." Kevin McTaggert, a henchman for Danny Greene, later told the FBI that Greene had contracted Hells Angels member Enis "Eagle" Crnic to kill Birns for a fee of $7,500. Crnic was later killed while attempting to attach a car bomb to a vehicle belonging to Cleveland crime family associate John "Johnny Del" Delzoppo on April 5, 1977.

In the Cleveland Press, Dick McLaughlin summed up his career: "A muscleman whose specialty was controlling numbers gambling on the East Side, keeping the peace among rival operators and getting a cut from each of them, Birns was a feared man because of his violent reaction to any adversary. Yet he was popular, had an engaging personality, was known by many newsmen because he was good copy and was ever ready to buy them a drink. He was a feared man, but a genial and generous man, holding court almost daily at the Theatrical Lounge where he lunched."

The relationship between Danny Greene and Shondor Birns exemplifies the volatile and often deadly nature of organized crime relationships. Initially allies with shared interests, their relationship deteriorated into one of mutual animosity and lethal retribution. Their violent conflict left a lasting mark on Cleveland's criminal history.

Birns's widow was oblivious to his conflict with Danny Greene, as her husband had largely concealed his underworld activities from her. Aware that Greene was also a dog lover, she gave his Doberman Pinscher to him. His remains are held at Hillcrest Cemetery in Bedford Heights, Ohio. Greene himself survived a little while longer (although the Birns - allied Licavoli faction continued trying to kill him due to his alliance with John Nardi) but, like Nardi, was later killed in a car bombing.
