= Kill the Irishman =

2011 film by Jonathan Hensleigh

- Theatrical release poster
- Directed by: Jonathan Hensleigh
- Screenplay by: Jonathan Hensleigh; Jeremy Walters
- Based on: To Kill the Irishman: The War That Crippled the Mafia by Rick Porrello
- Produced by: Al Corley; Bart Rosenblatt; Eugene Musso; Tommy Reid
- Starring: Ray Stevenson; Vincent D'Onofrio; Val Kilmer; Christopher Walken
- Cinematography: Karl Walter Lindenlaub
- Edited by: Douglas Crise
- Music by: Patrick Cassidy
- Production companies: Code Entertainment; Dundee Entertainment; Sweet William Productions
- Distributed by: Anchor Bay Films
- Release date: March 11, 2011
- Running time: 106 minutes
- Country: United States
- Language: English
- Budget: $12 million
- Box office: $1.2 million

Kill the Irishman is a 2011 American biographical crime film directed by Jonathan Hensleigh, and starring Ray Stevenson, Vincent D'Onofrio, Christopher Walken, and Val Kilmer. Written by Hensleigh and Jeremy Walters, it is based on the life of the Irish-American gangster Danny Greene, and was adapted from the book To Kill the Irishman: The War That Crippled the Mafia by Rick Porrello.

Before entering production, Kill the Irishman had a troubled development stage that lasted over a decade. Production commenced in 2009, and filming took place in and around Detroit.

The film chronicles the rise and fall of Danny Greene. He worked as a longshoreman on the Cleveland docks, until being chosen to serve as interim president of the International Longshoremen's Association in 1961. In 1964, he was convicted of embezzling $11,500 of the union's funds. After his conviction, Greene rose through the criminal underworld in Cleveland and waged war on the Mafia for control of the city. After many failed attempts on Greene's life, he was assassinated on October 6, 1977, by contract killer Ray Ferritto. Greene's death ultimately led to the demise of the Cleveland Mafia.

Kill the Irishman was released in the United States on March 11, 2011 and premiered at the Landmark Sunshine Cinema in New York City. Most of the cast, including Stevenson and D'Onofrio, were in attendance as was Shondor Birns' niece. The film received mixed reviews upon its release, with some reviewers criticizing the purported similarities to Martin Scorsese's Goodfellas. Kill the Irishman grossed $1,188,194 at the domestic box office, against a production budget of $12 million.

== Plot ==
In 1960, Danny Greene and childhood friends Billy McComber and Art Sneperger are longshoremen on the Cleveland docks. Sneperger's gambling leaves him indebted to Cleveland Mafia captain John Nardi. In return for cancelling Sneperger's debt, Danny supplies Nardi with goods stolen from the docks. Corrupt labor union boss Jerry Merke demands a cut of Danny's profits, and sends Polish American enforcer Joe Buka to kill him. Danny tells Polack jokes to provoke Buka into a fist fight and beats him unconscious. He kicks Merke out of his office, and is elected local union president. He improves the working conditions at the docks all while doing business with Nardi.

Danny's corrupt union president activities are revealed in an exposé by the local newspaper. Cleveland police detective Joe Manditski, who grew up with Danny in Collinwood, arrests him. Broke and facing prison, Danny pleads to lesser charges in return for becoming an FBI informant. Danny moves his unhappy wife and daughters back to Collinwood and Nardi gets him work as an enforcer for Jewish loan shark Shondor Birns. Nardi brokers a deal with Mafia captain Jack Licavoli. Danny's crew terrorizes the city's garbage haulers into joining the union controlled by Licavoli, but Danny's friend Mike Frato refuses. Danny refuses Licavoli's order to kill his friend. Nardi counsels him that Frato's refusal can't go unpunished.

Danny learns from the FBI that Sneperger has returned to gambling and has become a police informant. Sneperger is assigned to set a remote controlled bomb under Frato's car, but Danny sets it off as he is doing it. Frato and Danny shoot at each other in a park, and Frato is killed. When Frato's driver tells Manditski that Danny acted in self-defense, he's released from police custody. Danny's long suffering wife leaves him and takes their children.

Danny asks Birns for help in opening an upscale restaurant and lounge. Birns arranges a $70,000 loan from Paul Castellano of the Gambino family, but Birns' courier buys cocaine and gets arrested with the remaining money. Birns and Danny argue over who should pay the money back and Birns offers $25,000 to whoever kills Danny. Danny narrowly escapes, and kills Birns with a car bomb. After Mafia boss John T. Scalish dies, Licavoli is chosen by New York's Five Families to succeed him. He charges Danny a 30% "street tax" for doing business in Cleveland. Danny refuses to pay, crudely mocks Licavoli's Italian heritage, and vows, "The Irishman's in business for himself now."

Licavoli blows Danny's house up, but he and his girlfriend survive. When Licavoli attempts to demote Nardi and take away his business, Nardi joins forces with Danny and they vow to take over Cleveland together. They organize the murder of several of Licavoli's men. Danny escapes several bungled attempts on his life and the summer of 1976 sees 36 bombings in the Cleveland area between the warring gangs. Licavoli, humiliated by the national attention it draws, asks Genovese boss Anthony Salerno in New York for help.

Wanting a new life away from Cleveland with his new fiancé, Danny offers to surrender the war to Licavoli, in exchange for Salerno's investment in a Texas ranch for Danny. Salerno arranges for hitman Ray Ferritto to travel to Cleveland and work for Licavoli. Ferritto turns the tide for the Cleveland Mafia and all of Danny's closest allies, including Nardi, are killed. Danny refuses Detective Manditski's offer of protection. Ferrito kills Danny with a car bomb. A post-script narrated by Manditsky describes how Danny's murder crippled the American Mafia not only in Cleveland but nationwide.

== Cast ==
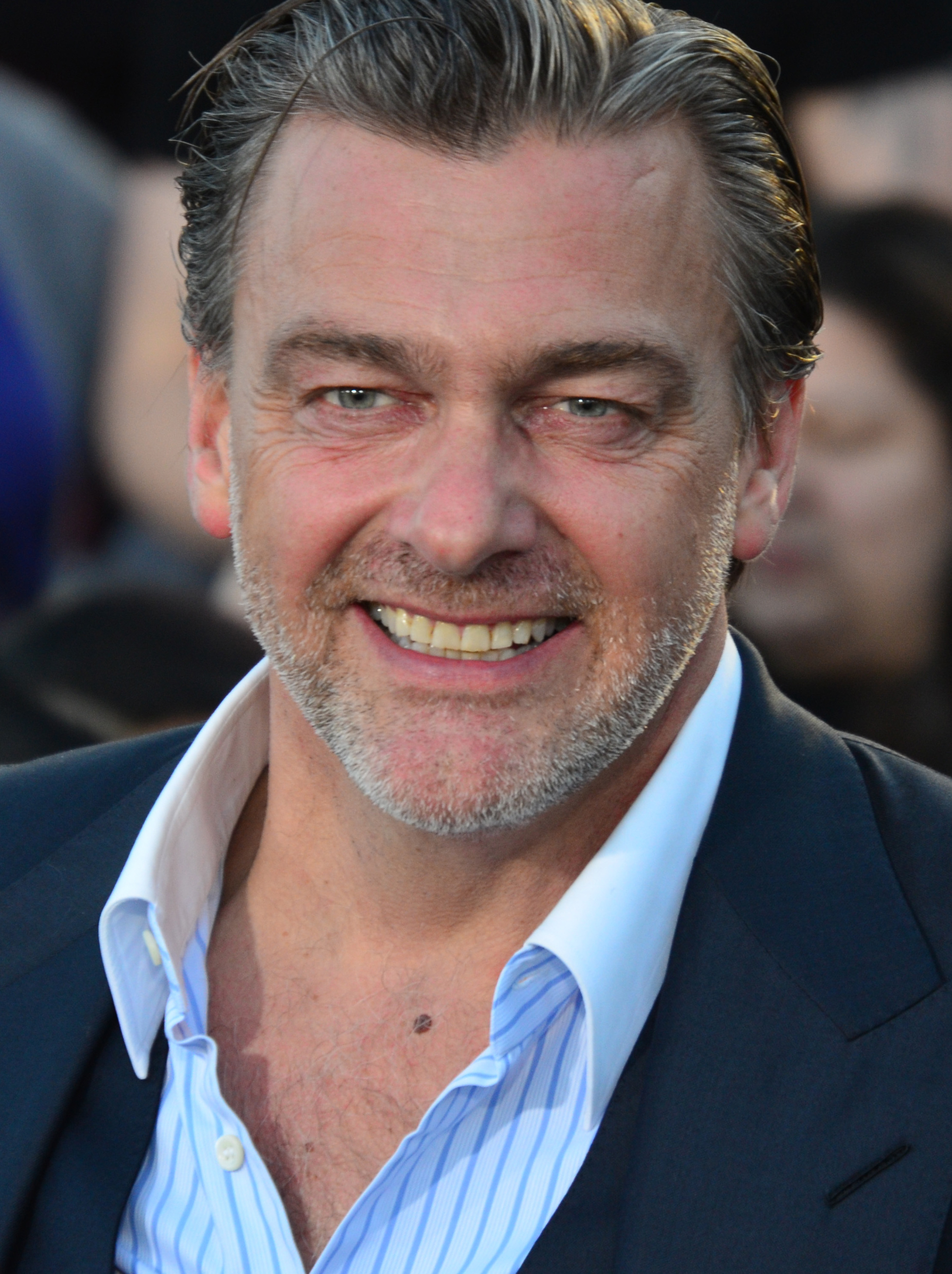
Ray Stevenson

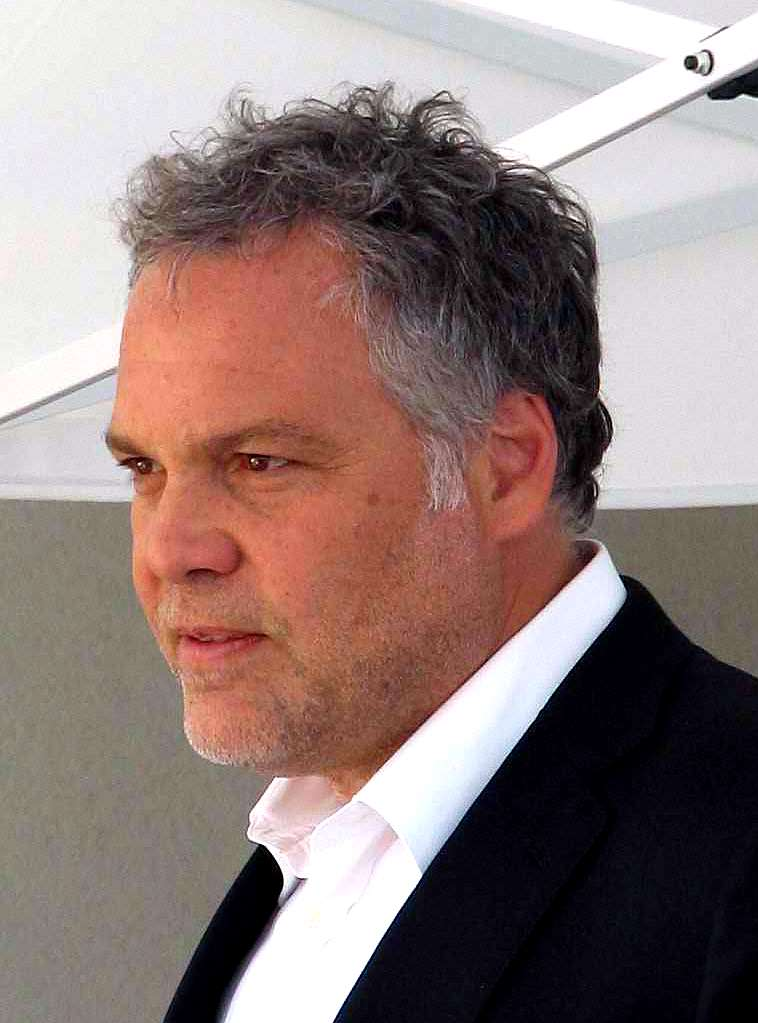
Vincent D'Onofrio

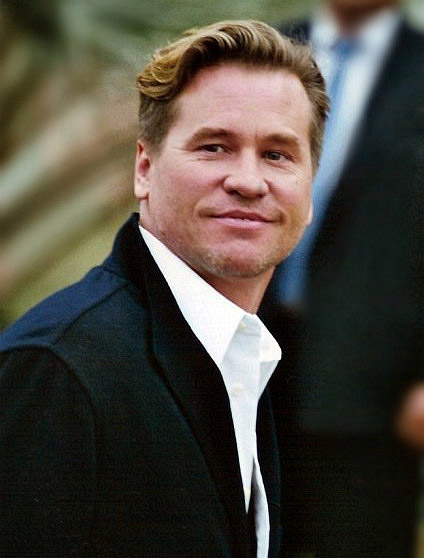
Val Kilmer

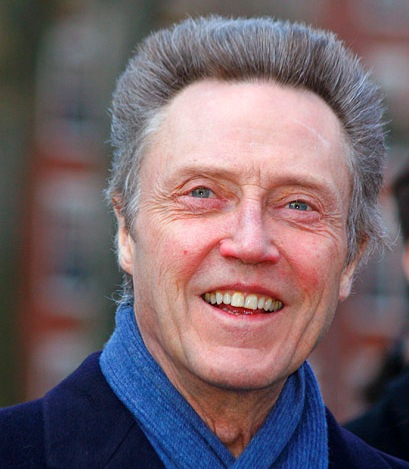
Christopher Walken

- Ray Stevenson as Danny Greene
- Vincent D'Onofrio as John Nardi
- Val Kilmer as Detective Joe Manditski (loosely based on Ed Kovacic)
- Christopher Walken as Alex 'Shondor' Birns
- Linda Cardellini as Joan Madigan
- Tony Darrow as Mikey Mendarolo
- Robert Davi as Ray Ferritto
- Fionnula Flanagan as Grace O'Keefe
- Bob Gunton as Jerry Merke
- Jason Butler Harner as Art 'Snep' Sneperger
- Vinnie Jones as Keith 'The Enforcer' Ritson
- Tony Lo Bianco as James 'Jack White' Licavoli
- Laura Ramsey as Ellie O'Hara
- Steve Schirripa as Mike 'Big Mike' Frato
- Paul Sorvino as Tony 'Fat Tony' Salerno
- Mike Starr as Leo 'Lips' Moceri
- Marcus Thomas as Billy McComber
- Vinny Vella as Frank 'Little Frank' Brancato
- Jeff Chase as Joe Buka

== Development ==
Kill the Irishman had been in development since 1997. Producer Tommy Reid heard that Rick Porrello, an Ohio policeman, was about to publish a book about Greene called To Kill the Irishman. Reid flew to Ohio and met with Porrello, who told Reid his grandfather was a high-ranking Mafia figure in Cleveland during the Prohibition era. On March 17, 1998, they signed a deal for the film rights to the book. Getting Kill the Irishman produced was difficult. Reid frequently left deals unconcluded, and discovered that the script he had commissioned was attached to a cover with another screenwriter and producer's name listed. According to Reid, this was a common occurrence in Hollywood, and he claims to have spent over $1 million to ensure the film was made.

== Pre-production ==
=== Inspiration ===
Reid was a fan of Mafia movies (including The Godfather and Goodfellas) and aspired to become a filmmaker. Being of Irish and Italian ancestry, he wanted to make a film that would relate to both nationalities. Reid first heard about mobster Danny Greene from his roommates in Ohio, and believed that New York City, Chicago and Boston were the "three meccas of mafia crime". According to Reid, there was not much documentation on Greene's life, but after hearing that Porrello was about to publish a book on Greene and the Mafia in Cleveland, he was determined to make a movie about him.

=== Background research ===
Prior to making Kill the Irishman, Reid and screenwriter Jeremy Walters conducted research on Greene's life and organized crime in Cleveland. Reid spoke with Sister Barbara Eppich, a nun who helped raise Greene during his childhood. Sister Barbara told Reid of how Greene was abandoned during childhood and was raised by his grandfather. Because his grandfather worked nights, Greene was left to walk the streets. He would go to school dirty on a regular basis, and Sister Barbara would have to wash him. She also stated that Greene would sleep all the time but was a "phenomenal athlete".

Reid spoke to a number of law enforcement agencies, including the FBI. The FBI wanted to make sure that Reid was not glorifying the Mafia. Reid stated he had no intentions of glorifying crime and that "the whole message at the end of the movie is that crime doesn't pay". On a similar subject, Hensleigh also said the "film [doesn't suggest Greene] was a hero". However, he did note the film provides a balanced perspective.

While researching his role, Stevenson looked at TV footage of Greene and read Porrello's book, To Kill The Irishman. According to Stevenson, there was "quite a bit" of research material available. D'Onofrio, on the other hand, had the opposite experience. Information on Nardi was scarce, so Hensleigh allowed him to improvise on his character.

=== Screenplay ===
Although the screenplay was adapted from his book, Porrello had "minimum involvement" in its writing. Hensleigh regularly contacted Porrello, and they agreed not to use the real names of anyone who was still alive, "out of respect and sensitivity" towards them.

=== Casting ===
Due to the troubled development of Kill the Irishman, Reid decided to make a documentary about Greene's life, to be entitled Danny Greene: the Rise and Fall of the Irishman. From his research for the movie, Reid became specialized in the Northern Ohio crime scene and Greene's life and felt that by making the documentary, he could go to his "grave saying I tried."

In 2009, with seventeen hours of the documentary shot, Reid was told his film had been greenlit. He joined forces with production company Code Entertainment and engaged with a "reliable" director, Jonathan Hensleigh. They signed actors Val Kilmer and Christopher Walken and later Vincent D'Onofrio (Full Metal Jacket), Paul Sorvino (Goodfellas), and Ray Stevenson. Stevenson was filming The Book of Eli when he received a telephone call from Hensleigh, so they arranged to meet in Los Angeles; according to Stevenson, he was drawn to the script and immediately made a deal.

== Production ==
=== Filming ===
On May 19, 2009, the film entered principal photography. It was shot within seven weeks, mostly in and around Detroit. This was partly because the city gave tax credits which Cleveland would not match. According to the 2009 report by the Michigan Film Office, Kill the Irishman received roughly $3 million in subsidies. Michigan's film rebate paid up to forty-two percent of filmmakers' expenses for costs incurred while filming in the state, whereas Ohio offered only twenty-five to thirty-five percent in subsidies, meaning that if the producers spent the same amount filming in Cleveland, they would have received $500,000 to $1.25 million less in subsidies. On the other hand, Stevenson said that they had wanted to film in Cleveland, but the city had "prettied itself up" and changed, while Detroit remained, in his opinion, "on its knees".

At one point during filming, seven bullet holes were shot into one of the crew's trucks used for the production. Another day, as the cast and crew were leaving the set, a pedestrian was shot in the neck outside a supermarket. The ambulance took thirty-five to forty-five minutes to arrive and waited a similar amount of time the police to arrive, as the paramedics refused to take the victim to the hospital without a police escort. According to Stevenson, there was a possibility that rival gang members might shoot at the paramedics for trying to resuscitate the victim.

== Post-production ==
=== Effects ===
The destruction of Greene's car. As with many scenes, the explosion couldn't be re-shot.

Due to the limited budget, some of the effects seen in the film could not be replicated. Stevenson said everyone "had to be on point," and that any mistakes could not be rectified by re-filming. For example, the producers could not afford to shoot the film's final scene (in which Greene is killed via a car explosion) twice. Before filming, the production crew and actors had to check everything on the set. Time was also lacking, with Stevenson saying everyone "had to be extremely focused."

=== Editing ===
Porrello had second thoughts about one scene being included in the film. This particular scene included the murder of two police officers. Porrello felt uncomfortable approaching Hensleigh, but did so anyway. Porrello said to him: "if you are going to kill a cop", it is "going to change the tone of the story". The scene was nevertheless included in the final cut.

== Reception ==
=== Critical response ===
On Rotten Tomatoes, the film holds an approval rating of 63% based on 51 reviews. The website's critical consensus reads: "Kill the Irishman may not add much in the way of new ingredients to its crowded genre, but the admirable efforts of a solidly assembled cast add extra depth to a familiar story." On Metacritic, the film has a weighted average score of 50 out of 100, based on 15 critics, indicating "mixed or average" reviews. A number of critics have called the film a ripoff of Goodfellas (1990).

Giving the film a positive review, Mike LaSalle, of the San Francisco Chronicle, said "What makes this film special and memorable is the character of Danny Greene, who is not the usual neighborhood hoodlum you see in movies, the kind who gets in deep and gradually loses his soul". Marshall Fine, of the Huffington Post, gave the film a mixed review. He criticized it for jumping through different events in a "jerky fashion", but summed up the review by calling it a "movie with a lot of meat on the bone, even if some of it is tough or stringy. It's not fancy, but it's always tasty".

Robert Abele, of the LA Times, said "the film plays like an explosion's aftermath; shards of mob movies that add up to the usual Goodfellas knockoff". Scott Tobias, of the A.V. Club, had similar views; saying "the biggest problem" with the film "isn't that it rips off Goodfellas", but that plenty of "good films" have "ripped it off well". In regards to the controversy surrounding Kill the Irishman and its purported similarities to Goodfellas, critic Dave Van Houwelingen said:

There are certain movies that serve as a standard bearer for a genre – a high water mark that filmmakers always try to hit, but seem to always come up short. To me, I think Martin Scorsese's Goodfellas is that type of film for the gangster genre. In the 21 years since the film was released, so many filmmakers have tried so hard to copy Goodfellas' success, and so few have gotten even close to capturing the magic that Scorsese did in one of his very best films. The 21 years have been littered with a bunch of pale imitations. To that list, you can add Jonathan Hensleigh's Kill the Irishman, which wants so desperately to be Goodfellas, and comes up so very, very short.

Hensleigh's directing was criticized. Scott Tobias said the directing "doesn't do much beyond filling in the template". He noted that Hensleigh was telling the "true-life tale" of the mob's decline in Cleveland, but also said that "every character and setpiece felt like it fell off a truck". LA Weekly's Nick Pinkerton held similar views, saying that although "Hensleigh perks up when filming violence, the atmosphere throughout is past-prime, stymieing any strut". Lisa Schwarzbaum, of Entertainment Weekly, also concurred, calling the film's structure "pretty square".

Despite criticizing the film's structure, Schwarzbaum called the cast "tasty", and singled out D'Onofrio, Kilmer, and Walken for praise. Clint O'Connor, of The Plain Dealer, held similar views, saying the "film's greatest strength is its cast". On the contrary, David Rooney held the opposite opinion, saying the "low-wattage cast" is what turned the "potentially strong" film into a "routine crime thriller".

=== Box office performance ===
On its opening day, Kill the Irishman earned $42,925 from five theaters (with an average gross of $8,585 per theater). On its second day, the box office receipts increased by 46 percent, earning $62,446 from five theaters (with an average gross of $12,489 per theater). Then on the third day, the film's box office performance dropped by 36 percent, earning $40,059 from five theaters (with an average gross of $8,012 per theater). The gradual decline in box office receipts continued until the eighth day, where the film's gross sharply increased by 373 percent, earning $36,119 from 21 theaters (with an average gross of $1,720 per theater). The film continued to have periodic fluctuations at the box office. By the end of its box office run, Kill the Irishman grossed a total of $1,188,194 at the domestic box office, against a production budget of $12 million, and so is considered a box office bomb.

=== Home media ===
After a limited theatrical release, Kill the Irishman was released on DVD by Anchor Bay Entertainment on June 14, 2011. As of October 22, 2015, the movie has grossed $2,498,115 in US DVD sales.

== Soundtrack ==
The soundtrack for the film includes 26 songs.

1. "I'm Gonna Keep On Loving You" - Kool Blues
2. "Crazy Little Notion" - The Two Guys
3. "All I Want Is You" - Leroy Osbourne
4. "I Like the Way You Look at Me" - The Pentagons
5. "Wrong or Right He's My Baby" - Helene Smith
6. "How About You" - Steven Lang
7. "Meet Me for a Martini" - Daniel May
8. "Paddy on the Landfill" - The Irish Experience
9. "Courting Clarinets" - Stefan Maciejewsk
10. "Heart of Gold" - Norman Chandler
11. "This Is It" - Lewis Lamedica
12. "Get in a Hurry" - Eugene Blacknell
13. "You're a Prisoner" - Death
14. "Broadway Shing-a-Ling" - Soul Blenders
15. "Daffy Dotty Day" - Lake Smash
16. "I'm Running Out of Time" - Gary Michael Allen
17. "Cielo e Mar" - Amilcare Ponchielli
18. "Sulla Riviera" - Bruno Bertoli
19. "Eternal Father For" - Michael Hankinson
20. "Your Smiling Face" - Norman Chandler
21. "It's Not Too Late" - Christopher Blue
22. "Drive Drive Drive" - Pat Cusick
23. "Like a Moth into a Flame" - The Automatics
24. "Don't Worry Tracy" - Christopher Blue
25. "Bonny Portmore" - The Rogues
26. "Seaport Lane" - Athena Tergis

== Bibliography ==
- Porrello, Rick (1998). To Kill the Irishman: The War That Crippled the Mafia. USA: Next Hat Publishing. ISBN 0966250877.
