= Bretejovce =

- Municipality
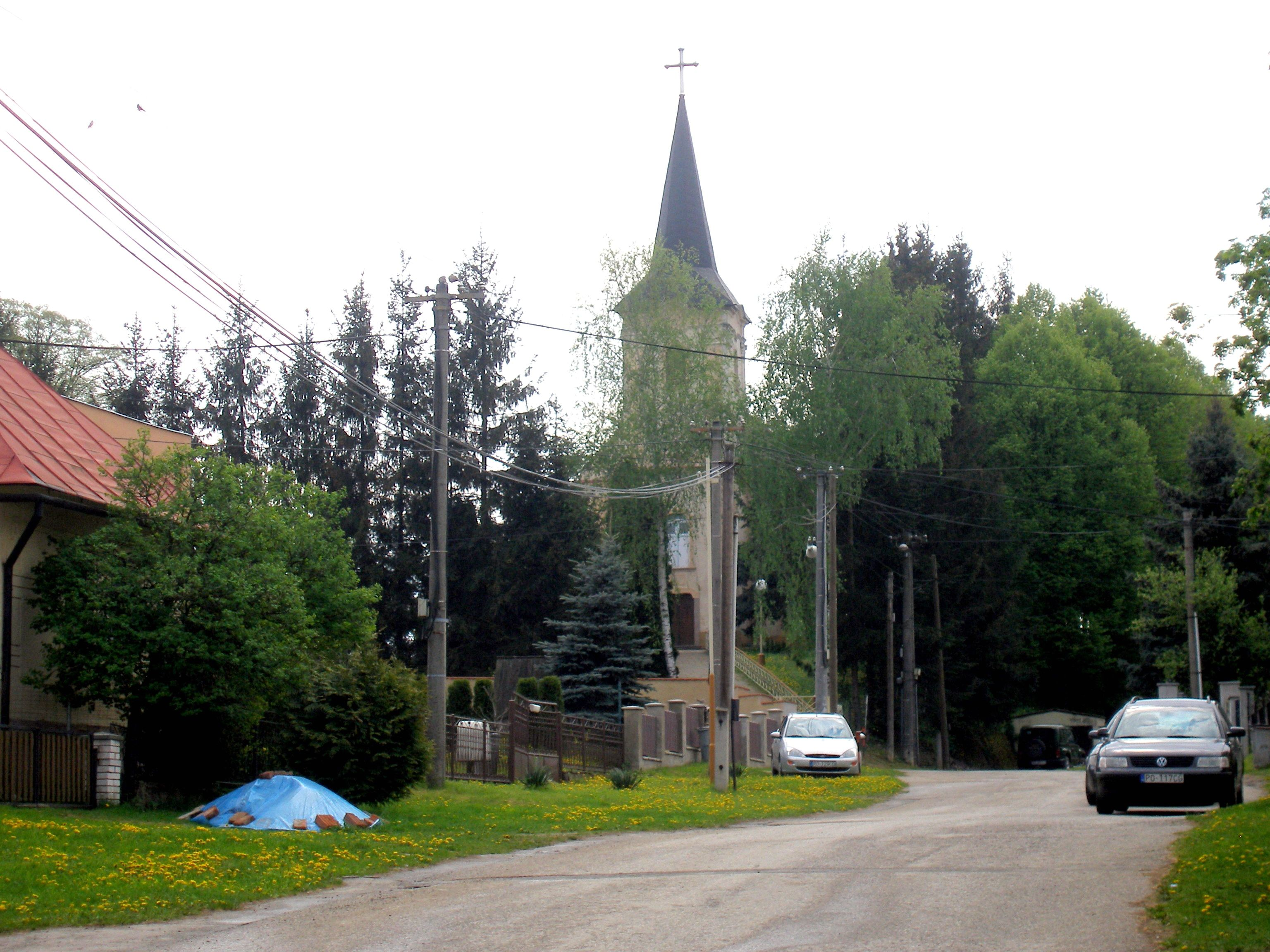

- Flag

- Location of Bretejovce in the Prešov Region Location of Bretejovce in Slovakia
- Coordinates: 48.83°N 21.29°E
- Country: Slovakia
- Region: Prešov Region
- District: Prešov District
- First mentioned: 1289

Government
  - Mayor: Pavel Mylan

Area
  - Total: 4.37 km^{2} (1.69 sq mi)
- Elevation: 215 m (705 ft)

Population (2025)
  - Total: 475
- Time zone: UTC+1 (CET)
  - Summer (DST): UTC+2 (CEST)
- Postal code: 820 3
- Area code: +421 51
- Vehicle registration plate (until 2022): PO
- Website: www.bretejovce.sk

Bretejovce (Hungarian: Sárosberettő or Berettő) is a village and municipality in Prešov District in the Prešov Region of eastern Slovakia.

== History ==
The village was first mentioned in historical records in 1289. Before 1918, it was part of Sáros county in Austria-Hungary.

== Geography ==
The municipality lies at an altitude of 215 metres (705 ft) and covers an area of 4.37 km^{2} (1.69 sq mi) (2025).

== Population ==
Population statistic (10 years)
Year	1995	2005	2015	2025
Count	382	364	390	475
Difference		−4.71%	+7.14%	+21.79%

Population statistic
Year	2024	2025
Count	472	475
Difference		+0.63%

It has a population of 475 people (31 December 2025).

In 1787, the village had 37 houses and 323 inhabitants. In 1828, 50 houses and 383 inhabitants. In 1900, there were 351 residents.

=== Ethnicity ===
Census 2021 (1+ %)
Ethnicity	Number	Fraction
Slovak	423	97.46%
Not found out	11	2.53%
Rusyn	8	1.84%
Czech	7	1.61%
Total	434	

In year 2021 was 434 people by ethnicity 423 as Slovak, 11 as Not found out, 8 as Rusyn, 7 as Czech, 2 as Hungarian, 2 as Other and 1 as Russian.

Note on population: The difference values of population numbers in the table "Population statistic" and in the sections "Ethnicity" & "Religion" is caused by the use of various statistical methods.

=== Religion ===
Census 2021 (1+ %)
Religion	Number	Fraction
Roman Catholic Church	301	69.35%
Evangelical Church	45	10.37%
None	33	7.6%
Greek Catholic Church	23	5.3%
Not found out	11	2.53%
Baptists Church	6	1.38%
Eastern Orthodox Church	5	1.15%
Total	434	

In year 2021 was 434 people by religion 301 from Roman Catholic Church, 45 from Evangelical Church, 33 from None, 23 from Greek Catholic Church, 11 from Not found out, 6 from Baptists Church, 5 from Eastern Orthodox Church, 3 from Jehovah's Witnesses, 3 from Other, 2 from Apostolic Church, 1 from Calvinist Church and 1 from Ad hoc movements.

== Landmarks ==
Bretejovce's Roman Catholic church, The Seven Sorrows of Mary or, Our Lady of Sorrows, (Slovak: Kostol Sedembolestnej Panny Márie), was built in the baroque style in 1785, and sits at the top of a hill at the end of the main side street in the village. The church is part of the Budimir parish, and part of the Košice archdiocese. The village's coat of arms incorporates the symbol for the Seven Sorrows of Mary, seven swords piercing a heart.

== See also ==
- List of municipalities and towns in Slovakia

== Genealogical resources ==
The records for genealogical research are available at the state archive "Statny Archiv in Kosice, Slovakia"

- Roman Catholic church records (births/marriages/deaths): 1747–1896 (parish B)
- Greek Catholic church records (births/marriages/deaths): 1819–1898 (parish B)
- Lutheran church records (births/marriages/deaths): 1787–1895 (parish B)
