= Danny Greene =

Irish-American mobster (1933–1977)

- Greene circa. 1970s
- Born: Daniel John Patrick Greene; November 14, 1933; Cleveland, Ohio, U.S.
- Died: October 6, 1977 (aged 43); Lyndhurst, Ohio, U.S.
- Cause of death: Murder by car bomb
- Resting place: Calvary Cemetery, Cleveland, Ohio
- Other names: "The Irishman"; "Mr. Patrick" (FBI codename)
- Occupations: Longshoreman, dock worker, teamster, mobster, racketeer, Mafia family associate
- Known for: Former associate of Cleveland mobster John Nardi War with the Cleveland Mafia

Daniel John Patrick Greene (November 14, 1933 – October 6, 1977) was an Irish-American mobster in Cleveland, Ohio, whose conflicts with the Cleveland crime family of the Italian-American Mafia ended in Greene's murder in 1977. Greene initially built a close working relationship with Jewish-American organized crime figure Shondor Birns, as neither of them could become a "made" man in the mafia due to lack of Italian ancestry.

Greene gained power in the local chapter of the International Longshoremen's Association (ILA), where he was elected president during the early 1960s. He later became a full-time crime boss and began competing with the Cleveland crime family and one-time friend Shondor Birns for control of the city's criminal underworld. Greene set up his own crew called the Celtic Club, and allied with outlaw biker gangs, effectively becoming the Irish mob in Cleveland, and the Italian-American Mafia's main competitor. Celtic identity became Greene's trademark in the underworld.

During the 1970s, Greene allied with mob-affiliated labor union leader John Nardi during the latter's war against Jack Licavoli for leadership of the Cleveland family. The war involved at least 37 separate bombings, mostly car bombs. 21 of the bombings were in the city of Cleveland and 16 of the bombings took place in the suburbs. It is estimated by the FBI that Greene was involved in three of every four bombings. Other bombings in Cleveland, like the Thinker statue at the Cleveland Museum of Art in 1970, Playhouse Square in 1970, and ones at Cleveland schools in the 1960s and 1970s by George Cicero, were unrelated to Greene and the Cleveland crime family.

Greene survived multiple attempts on his life and taunted the Licavoli faction as "maggots" in the local press, before finally being assassinated by Los Angeles crime family enforcers Ray Ferritto and Ronald "Ronnie The Crab" Carabbia in 1977.

A police investigation revealed that Greene's murder had been a criminal conspiracy between the Mafia families of Cleveland, New York City and Southern California. The investigation also resulted in the defections of Ray Ferritto and Los Angeles boss Jimmy Fratianno, followed by the exposure and arrest of a mole inside the Cleveland FBI. The investigation also laid the groundwork for many Federal prosecutions of the Mafia.

== Early life and education ==
Daniel John Patrick "Danny" Greene was born November 14, 1933, in Cleveland, Ohio, to John Henry Greene and Irene Cecelia Greene (née Fallon). His father was also born in Cleveland, his mother was born in Pennsylvania.

Three days after his birth, Greene's mother died. He was called "Baby Greene" until his mother was buried, after which he was eventually named after his grandfather (Daniel John Greene). Danny's father drank heavily and eventually lost his job as a salesman for Fuller Brush. Unable to provide for Danny, his father placed him in Parmadale, a Roman Catholic orphanage in Parma, Ohio, three miles outside Cleveland. After this, Danny temporarily moved in with his grandfather (a newspaper printer) in Collinwood, who had also been recently widowed. Greene's fights with Italian kids on the streets of Collinwood led to his lifelong hatred of Italians.

In 1939, Danny's father began dating a nurse. He married her, and they started their own family and brought Danny to live with them.

At age 6, Danny resented his stepmother and ran away on several occasions. His paternal grandfather took him in, and Danny lived with him and an aunt for the rest of his childhood in the Collinwood neighborhood. Taking advantage of his grandfather working at night, Danny roamed the streets at night.

Danny attended St. Jerome Catholic School, where he developed a great fondness for the nuns and priests, developed a lasting friendship with some of his teachers, and served as an altar boy. He was athletic, excelled at baseball, and was an all-star basketball player. Although Danny was a poor student, the nuns at St. Jerome let him play sports because he was valuable to the team.

Danny attended St. Ignatius High School. There he frequently fought with Italian-American students, who were children of more recent immigrants struggling for a place, and he developed an intense dislike for Italian-Americans that lasted his entire life.

After being expelled from Saint Ignatius, he transferred to Collinwood High School, where he excelled in athletics. He was also a Boy Scout for a short time, before being kicked out of his troop. He was also expelled from Collinwood High School due to excessive tardiness.

== Military service ==
After being expelled from Collinwood High School in 1951, Greene enlisted in the United States Marine Corps, where he was soon noticed for his abilities as a boxer and marksman. He was stationed for a time at Marine Corps Base Camp Lejeune, Jacksonville, North Carolina and was transferred many times, possibly because of his behavior. Greene was promoted to the rank of corporal in 1953.

== Waterfront ==
In the early 1960s, Greene worked steadily as a longshoreman at the Cleveland docks, years before the work was unionized by the International Longshoremen's Association (ILA). In his free time he read about Ireland and its turbulent history and began to think of himself as a "Celtic warrior". In 1961, the ILA removed the president of the local union. Greene was chosen to serve as interim president and handily won the next election. He was known to drive a green car, and wear green jackets.

In office, he raised dues 25% and pushed workers to perform "volunteer" hours to assist in providing a "building fund". Those who refused often found themselves losing work. He fired more than 50 members while denouncing them as "winos and bums" to other workers. Greene led sometimes violent protests and strikes to force the stevedore companies to allow the ILA to oversee the hiring of dockworkers. To land a job as a longshoreman, many workers had to unload grain from the ships on a temporary basis and turn their paychecks over to Greene. Said to have been collected to build a union hall, most of the funds ended up in Greene's bank account.

An unidentified ILA member would later recall about Greene, "He read On the Waterfront. He imagined himself a tough dock boss. But he was thirty years too late. He used workers to beat up union members who did not come in line, but he was never seen fighting himself. As a union organizer, Greene sometimes declared work stoppages, as frequently as 25 per day, to demonstrate to company owners his authority on the docks. On one occasion, he threatened to murder the two children of one owner, and the FBI put the man's house and family under protection. After Sam Marshall, an investigative reporter, collected affidavits that supported charges of extortion, Greene was exiled from the union and convicted of embezzlement. The conviction was later overturned on appeal.

Rather than face a second trial, Greene pleaded guilty to the lesser charge of falsifying union records, was fined $10,000, and received a suspended sentence. After returning to his rackets, Greene met and befriended Teamsters boss Louis Triscaro, who introduced Greene to Jimmy Hoffa. After the friendly meeting, Hoffa later reportedly said to Triscaro, "Stay away from that guy. There's something wrong with him." According to Nancy Greene (Hegler), Greene was a bit like "Jekyll and Hyde" — a reference that lends insight upon his volatile personality. Eventually, Marty McCann, of the Organized Crime Division of the FBI, recruited Greene as an informant. Greene passed along information to the FBI and became a confidential informant.

Greene's codename was "Mr. Patrick", a reflection of pride in his Irish heritage.

The ILA began its own investigation and soon removed Greene from office. Eventually, Greene was convicted in federal court of embezzling $11,500 in union funds and on two counts of falsifying records. The verdict was overturned by an appeals court; federal prosecutors and Greene negotiated a settlement of Greene's guilty plea in exchange for two misdemeanor charges and a $10,000 fine, but he paid only a fraction of it.

== Family ==
Greene was married twice. He was married to June Tears from 1953 to 1956. His second marriage was to Nancy Hegler from 1956 to 1960. He and Nancy had five children.

In 2025, Greene's son Daniel Kelly served as a city councilman for the city of Cleveland.

== Criminal career ==
Greene was hired by the Cleveland Solid Waste Trade Guild to "keep the peace". Impressed with his abilities, mobster Alex "Shondor" Birns hired him as an enforcer for his various "numbers" operators. The Cleveland Mafia family underboss, Frank "Little Frank" Brancato, used Greene and other Irish-American gangsters, during the 1960s, to act as muscle to enforce the Mafia's influence over the garbage-hauling contracts and other rackets.

Until his death in 1973, Brancato reportedly regretted having brought Greene into the mob due to the damage Greene did. For example, in May 1968, under Birns's orders, Greene was supposed to attack a black numbers man who was holding out on protection money due. Unfamiliar with the military-type detonator, Greene barely made it out of his car before the bomb exploded. He survived being thrown nearly 20 feet, although the hearing in his right ear was damaged for life.

"Big Mike" Frato broke away from the Cleveland Solid Waste Trade Guild and founded the more legitimate trade group called the Cuyahoga County Refuse Haulers Association. A legitimate businessman, he protested Greene's bringing mob involvement and strong-arm tactics to the guild. The Cleveland Solid Waste Trade Guild fell apart shortly thereafter. In September 1970, Greene instructed Art Sneperger to place a bomb on Frato's car, but Sneperger had second thoughts and told Frato. Sneperger was a police informant and told Sgt. Edward Kovacic of the Cleveland Police intelligence unit about Greene's plans and Greene's role as an FBI informant. Greene once again ordered Sneperger to plant a bomb on Frato's car in 1971. The bomb detonated before Sneperger could get away, killing him and sparing Frato, who was across the street. Police suspected that Greene may have purposefully detonated the bomb early with the intention of sending a message to Frato.

Some investigators believed the premature explosion was caused by a radio signal, possibly from a shortwave radio or a passing police car. Others thought that Birns and Greene killed Sneperger after learning he was an informant. Sgt. Kovacic was told by an underworld source that Greene had pushed the detonator, killing Sneperger instantly. The case was never officially solved. On November 26, 1971, Frato was shot and killed at Cleveland's White City Beach. Greene was arrested and interrogated, he admitted to the killing but claimed self-defense. He said Frato had fired three shots at Greene, who was jogging and exercising his dogs and fired one back. Evidence seemed to corroborate Greene's story, and he was released. Cleveland police later learned Frato was armed and had an opportunity to kill Greene several weeks prior to the White Beach shooting. During their partnership, Greene and Frato had become so close that they had named sons after each other.

Not long afterwards, Greene again found himself a target while jogging in White City Beach. A sniper, concealed several hundred feet away, fired several shots at Greene from a rifle. Instead of ducking to the ground, Greene pulled out his revolver and started shooting, while running toward his would-be assassin. The sniper fled and was never identified. Investigators learned that this attempt was part of a murder contract left by Birns. Greene left his wife and their three children for their own safety and moved to Collinwood, where he rented an apartment.

Journalist Ned Whelan wrote about Greene: "Imagining himself as a feudal baron, he supported a number of destitute Collinwood families, paid tuition to Catholic schools for various children and, like the gangsters of the Twenties, actually had 50 twenty-pound turkeys delivered to needy households on Thanksgiving." He often picked up restaurant tabs for friends, neighbors and acquaintances, and left generous tips. Greene evicted a bookmaker who operated out of a small Waterloo business, and kept a local bar in order by making visits.

=== The Celtic Club ===
Greene formed his own crew of young Irish-American gangsters, called "The Celtic Club". His main enforcers were Keith "The Enforcer" Ritson, Kevin McTaggart, Brian O'Donnell, Danny Greene Jr., Billy McDuffy, Elmer Brittain, Ernest "Ted" Waite, Art "Snep" Sneperger and Jimmy "Icepick" Sterling who set up gambling dens across the city. He also allied with John Nardi, a Cleveland crime family labor racketeer who wanted to overthrow the leadership.

The relationship between Greene and Birns began to sour. Greene had asked Birns for a loan of $75,000 to set up a "cheat spot" (speakeasy and gambling house). Birns arranged for it through the Gambino crime family, but the money was lost in the hands of Birns's courier Billy Cox, who used it to purchase cocaine. The police raided Cox's house, arrested him, and seized the narcotics and what was left of the $75,000. The Gambino family wanted their money, and Birns pressed Greene, who refused to return it, reminding Birns that he could not return something he had never received and that Birns was responsible for it, since Birns's courier had lost it.

To settle the dispute, Birns directed an associate to hire a hitman for Greene, gave him $25,000 for the job, and noted it should be carried out even in the event of any harm befalling Birns. Several minor underworld characters, burglars by trade, took the contract, but their numerous assassination attempts on Greene failed.

Not long afterward, Greene found an unexploded bomb in his car when he pulled into a Collinwood service station to get gas. The explosive was wired improperly and failed to detonate. Greene disassembled the bomb himself, removed the dynamite and brought the rest of the package to a policeman, Edward Kovacic. Kovacic offered him police protection, but Greene refused it.

Suspecting that Birns had ordered the hit, Greene decided to retaliate. On March 29, 1975, Holy Saturday, the eve of Easter, Birns was blown up by a bomb containing C-4, a potent military explosive, in the lot behind Christy's Lounge, formerly Jack & Jill West Lounge, a go-go spot at 2516 Detroit Ave. near St. Malachi's Church.

On May 12, 1975, at 3:50 am, a bomb was thrown through the storefront window of Greene's office to his industrial consulting firm, Emerald Enterprises Inc., at 15805 Waterloo Road in Collinwood by William "Mo" Kiraly and Joseph "Joey" Gallo. Greene and his girlfriend, high school senior Denise Schmidt, were asleep in a second-floor apartment above the office. Greene escaped with only broken ribs as he was shielded from the debris as the building collapsed by a refrigerator that had lodged against a wall, and Schmidt was saved by the bed. Greene’s two pet cats were killed in the explosion. The building was destroyed along with Greene's Lincoln automobile. A second, more powerful bomb made from tetrytol and a three-gallon container of gasoline, planted at the rear of the building, failed to explode due to a defective fuse. According to Lt. Edward Kovacic of the Cleveland Police Scientific Investigation Unit, "half of Collinwood would have gone up" had the second device exploded. Greene credited the intercession of St. Jude, whose medal he always wore around his neck, for his survival. After the bombing, Greene fenced off the vacant lot, installed two trailers and raised the Irish tricolor, where he would often sit outside sunning himself.

In 1975, Greene began to push into the vending machine racket, traditionally controlled by the Mafia, as well as muscling into gambling operations. This angered the Cleveland family leadership, especially the soldier Thomas "The Chinaman" Sinito. Greene controlled some of the more lucrative laundry contracts that Sinito wanted, and Sinito deemed the fees excessive that Greene charged for coin-operated laundry contracts extortion.

In Greene's competition with the Mafia to build a vending machine empire, John Conte became a victim. Conte owned a vending machine company (that provided slot machines to various private clubs and parties) while working as a route man for another one. Conte was also a close friend of Joseph Gallo. On the day of Conte's disappearance, he told his wife he had a meeting with Greene. That was the last time she saw him; his badly beaten corpse was discovered a few days later at a dump site in Austintown. Police investigators thought that Conte was beaten to death in Greene's trailer and his body later transported to Austintown. They found some physical evidence, but Greene was never charged with Conte's murder.

In 1976, longtime mobster John Scalish died, leaving control of Cleveland's lucrative criminal operations, specifically the city's Teamsters Union locals, up for grabs. Upon Scalish's death, Greene became the most powerful enemy of the Cleveland mob. Scalish had appointed James Licavoli as his successor, but other mobsters, such as John Nardi, challenged Licavoli for leadership of the organization. Within weeks, with Greene's assistance, Nardi had many of Licavoli's supporters killed, including Licavoli's underboss, Leo "Lips" Moceri. The Cleveland family's enforcer, Eugene "The Animal" Ciasullo, was seriously injured and sidelined for several months by a car bomb. Soon afterward, a bomb planted in Alfred "Allie" Calabrese's car killed an innocent man: Frank Pircio, of Collinwood, died while moving Calabrese's Lincoln Continental before getting his own car out of their shared driveway.

This began a longstanding war between Licavoli's Cleveland crime family and Greene's Celtic Club. In 1976 alone, 36 bombs exploded around the Cleveland area, which was soon given the moniker "Bomb City, U.S.A." The ATF tripled its staff in northeast Ohio in order to handle the bomb investigations. A suspected bombmaker, Martin Heidtman, was arrested but was released for lack of evidence. Rick Porrello reported in his book, To Kill The Irishman, that Greene, using bombs or bullets, killed at least eight of the Mafia hitmen sent to assassinate him.

== Final days ==
=== Media personality ===
After the Waterloo Road bombing failed to kill him, Greene played up the stories of the Mafia's failed assassination attempts to his benefit. His bravado and flamboyant behavior only added to his growing aura of invincibility and power in the urban legends of the Cleveland criminal underworld. Greene granted interviews to local television stations; for a newspaper photographer, posed proudly in front of a boarded-up window of his destroyed apartment building; and during a televised interview said to one television reporter,

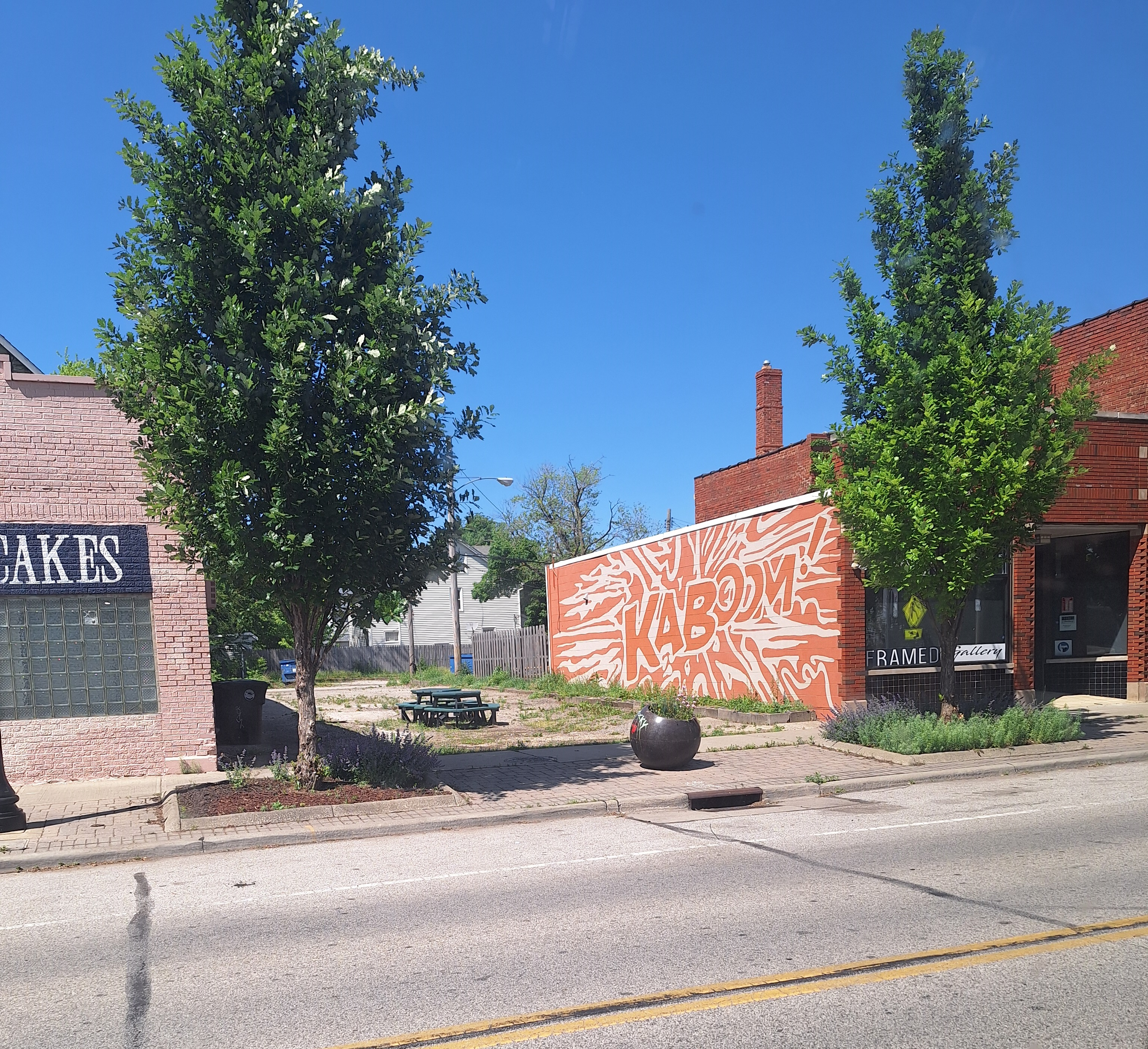
The lot where Danny Greene's apartment once stood. The word "kaboom!" is written in graffiti art on the wall.

The luck of the Irish is with me and I have a message for those yellow maggots. That includes the payers and the doers. The doers are the people who carried out the bombing. They have to be eliminated because the people who paid them can't afford to have them remain alive. And the payers are going to feel great heat from the FBI and the local authorities ... And let me clear something else up. I didn't run away from the explosion. Someone said they saw me running away. I walked away.

In response to the reporter's assertion that, like a cat, Greene had nine lives, Greene said, "I am an Irish Catholic. I believe that the Guy upstairs pulls the strings, and you're not going to go until he says so. It just wasn't my time yet."

In another televised interview, Greene denied any knowledge of the underworld war. He said, "I have no axe to grind, but if these maggots in this so-called Mafia want to come after me, I'm over here by the Celtic Club. I'm not hard to find."

=== Assassination ===
Overhead shot of the Danny Greene bombing murder scene (Greene's body is noticeable in the center)

On May 17, 1977, Greene's longtime ally John Nardi was killed by a bomb, planted by Pasquale Cisternino and Ronald Carabbia. After Nardi was murdered, Licavoli arranged a ceasefire with Greene, hoping to catch him off-guard and then have him killed. Shortly after their meeting, Greene muscled in on a large West Side gambling operation originally run by Nardi. Greene offered a percentage to Licavoli, who declined it.

The Cleveland Mafia, particularly the Porrello and Licavoli crime families, saw Greene as a major threat that needed to be neutralized. The plan to assassinate him was orchestrated by members of these families, with key figures such as James "Jack White" Licavoli and Angelo "Big Ange" Lonardo playing significant roles. They hired Ray Ferritto, a member from the Los Angeles Mob, to help get the job done. The plot involved meticulous planning and the use of sophisticated explosive devices, a method that had been both favored and survived by Greene himself.

On October 6, 1977, Greene went to a dental appointment at the Brainard Place office building in Lyndhurst, Ohio. Members of the Mafia had tapped his phone and knew about the appointment. In an attempt to throw off his enemies Greene was borrowing his fellow mob member's car. However, Ferritto was still able to identify Greene. While Greene was in his appointment a "bomb car" was moved into the spot directly next to Greene's car. After Greene had visited a dentist and left the office building, he approached his car. The car parked next to his exploded, killing Greene instantly. The car bomb was believed to have been planted by a hitman known as Ray Ferritto. A young woman who witnessed Ferritto pulling out of the parking lot prior to the bomb exploding had locked eyes with Ferritto and copied down his license plate number. Later, she sat down to draw a sketch of Ferritto. The female witness was Debbie Spoth, a sketch artist and daughter of Berea police detective Art Volpe, who handed the sketch over to Lt. Andy Vanyo at Cleveland Intelligence. After gathering more evidence, just a few weeks later, Ferritto would confess his crimes to the FBI. Greene's remains were cremated on October 8, 1977, and he was buried at Calvary Cemetery in Cleveland.

=== Aftermath ===
Greene's remains were cremated on October 8, 1977, and interred at Calvary Cemetery.

Ray Ferritto was arrested in relation to Greene's murder. Ferritto implicated Jimmy Fratianno in the planning of the murder, and Fratianno was indicted for charges related to the bombing. Fearing for his safety, Fratianno agreed to become a government witness against the Mafia. When asked, Ferritto felt no remorse for killing Greene stating, "To me it was like having a glass of wine. It didn't mean a thing to me." In return for his testimony, he pleaded guilty to the murder charges and received a five-year prison sentence, of which he served 21 months. In 1980, after testifying for the government that led to the racketeering convictions of five reputed Mafia figures, Fratianno entered the federal Witness Protection Program.

== In popular culture ==
- Rick Porrello, a former Cleveland-area police lieutenant, wrote To Kill The Irishman: The War that Crippled the Mafia (1998), about Greene's engagement with the Mafia. He won a national non-fiction award for the book.
- Porrello's book was adapted as a film first entitled The Irishman: The Legend of Danny Greene.
- The documentary film Danny Greene: The Rise and Fall of the Irishman (2009), directed and produced by Tommy Reid.
- The biopic Kill the Irishman (2011), which loosely chronicles Greene's life, was directed by Jonathan Hensleigh, stars Ray Stevenson as Greene.
- The Law & Order season 11 episode, "Brother's Keeper", is based on Greene's case.
