= Dave Green (police officer) =

American sheriff

Retired Lt. David J. Green (born in Miami, August 17, 1938; died in Tampa, Florida, on August 23, 2012). Dave served in the US Navy for four years in the Pacific. Lt. David Green became a police officer in 1960 with Metro Dade Police in Miami. He was a Special Agent Supervisor with Florida Department of Law Enforcement (FDLE), a Lieutenant with the Broward County Sheriffs Office, and finally, a Deputy with the Larimer County Sheriffs Office in Ft. Collins CO.

Lt. Dave Green, when a member of the Broward County Sheriff's Office in Fort Lauderdale, Florida, engaged in a two-year (1985–1987) undercover investigation that led to the arrest and conviction of members of the Bonanno, Bufalino, Gambino, and Genovese Mafia families.

As part of Operation Cherokee Green assumed the identity of Danny Ledford, a stolen liquor salesman. Using this identity he was able to infiltrate organised crime families in South Florida and record over 2,000 conversations linking suspects to narcotics sales, extortion, firearms violations and solicitation for homicide. While undercover he learned inside information about the assassination of Gambino Mafia boss Paul Castellano. This investigation is listed in a U.S Senate Subcommittee Report titled: Hearings before the Subcommittee on Investigations of the Committee on Governmental Affairs, United States Senate: Organized Crime: 25 Years After Valachi, Exhibit No. 44, pages 1007 to 1069.

Green followed this investigation with a one-year undercover investigation in 1989 of Cleveland Mafia boss John "Peanuts" Tronolone, who resided in South Florida. The investigation was tricky because Tronolone knew Green's identity. Green disguised himself as an outlaw motorcycle biker and traded allegedly stolen jewelry for a loan shark debt. This was the only time in America that a Mafia boss was arrested in a hand-to-hand transaction with a member of local law enforcement. Tronolone was convicted and sentenced to nine years in prison.

This arrest was feature in Cleveland Magazine and is on file with the Broward County Sheriff's Office.

Green had met Tronolone in 1976 when Tronolone appeared before a statewide grand jury probing illegal gambling in Florida. Appearing at the same jury was a Bruno Mafia capo named Johnny "Keys" Simone. Simone and many of the Philadelphia-based Bruno Mafia family were murdered in the early 1980s. In 1986 Tronolone was named in a federal indictment as the person who set Simone up to be shot in the head. Tronolone was not convicted of this charge. The federal indictment: UNITED STATES DISTRICT COURT FOR THE SOUTHERN DISTRICT OF NEW YORK631 F. Supp. 1364; 1986 U.S. Dist. LEXIS 27309.

Tronolone and Simone's appearance is outlined in Florida's Second Statewide Grand Jury's final report.

Green is one of the few law enforcement officials to have investigated and spoke in length with Meyer Lansky, considered by many to have been the most significant mobster of all time.

In all Dave Green spent seven years in an undercover capacity investigating organized crime. Segments of his investigations are listed in the following books: Cigar City Mafia, written Scott M. Deitche. Blue Thunder, written by Thomas Burdiick. The Insider, written by Donald Goddard. To Kill the Irishman, (editions published before March 2011) written by Rick Porrello. Little Man, Meyer Lansky and the Gangster Life, written by British author Robert Lacey.

He was survived by three children; Lisa Green, David Green Jr, and Ryan D. Green.
