= John Tronolone =

American crime boss (1910-1991)

- Born: December 12, 1910; Buffalo, New York, U.S.
- Died: May 29, 1991 (aged 80); Miami Beach, Florida, U.S.
- Other name: "Peanuts"
- Occupation: Crime boss
- Predecessor: James T. Licavoli
- Successor: Anthony Liberatore
- Allegiance: Buffalo crime family; Cleveland crime family
- Convictions: Possession of burglary tools (1932); Violation of gambling laws (1945); Racketeering (1990)
- Penalty: 9 months' imprisonment (1932); 18 months' imprisonment (1945); 9 years' imprisonment (1990)

John "Peanuts" Tronolone (December 12, 1910 − May 29, 1991) was an American mobster who succeeded crime boss James Licavoli as head of the Cleveland crime family. He was initially affiliated with a faction of the Buffalo crime family which was absorbed by the Cleveland family. After serving as consigliere and acting boss, Tronolone ran the Cleveland family from 1985 until his death in 1991 following the Licavoli-Nardi gang wars.

== Criminal career ==
Born in Buffalo, New York, Tronolone was the oldest of nine children of Maria (née Gnozzo) and Vincenzo Tronolone, an immigrant from San Fele in the Basilicata region of southern Italy. He allegedly gained his nickname "Peanuts" by giving peanuts to neighborhood children visiting his father's laundromat. Tronolone was arrested three times before the age of 21. In 1932, he was convicted of possession of burglary tools and sentenced to nine months in prison.

During the 1930s, Tronolone was a close associate of Buffalo mobster Joseph DiCarlo, serving as DiCarlo's chief lieutenant in the city's illegal gambling and bookmaking rackets. In May 1935, he and several other members of the DiCarlo gang were arrested under New York's anti-racketeering "Brownell law". Tronolone and three others were convicted and sentenced to six-month prison terms, but the sentences were later suspended due to controversy surrounding the newly-passed legislation. In August 1937, Tronolone and DiCarlo were arrested after allegedly assaulting Roman "Whitey" Kroll, who claimed to have been beaten by the two gangsters for refusing to pay protection money on his bookmaking operation. Tronolone and DiCarlo were acquitted in 1937.

In 1944, law enforcement began a crackdown on DiCarlo's gambling operations, conducting numerous raids on a betting parlor on Niagara Street. The investigation was aided by Edward J. Pospichal, a "lone wolf" anti-gambling crusader who alleged "collusion" between the racketeers and local police. Tronolone, DiCarlo and Buffalo police captain Thomas F. O'Neill were among eleven men indicted on December 30, 1944 by an Erie County grand jury investigating gambling activities in Buffalo. Pospichal was shot dead in an unsolved murder on January 28, 1945. On April 23, 1945, Tronolone and DiCarlo were convicted of conspiracy to violate gambling laws, and aiding and abetting a police officer to neglect his duty, while O'Neill was found guilty of willful neglect and willful omission of duty in failing to suppress gambling. Tronolone and DiCarlo was each sentenced to serve 18 months at Erie County Penitentiary and fined $500.

Following his their release from prison in 1946, Tronolone, DiCarlo and other members of their gang relocated to Youngstown, Ohio, where their faction was absorbed into the Cleveland crime family. Under the supervision of Cleveland family capodecina James "Jack White" Licavoli, the DiCarlo gang took control of bookmaking and gambling operations in Youngstown. Tronolone moved to Miami Beach, Florida in 1948 and remained a resident Dade County for the rest of his life. He continued gambling and bookmaking racketeering in South Florida in close association with two other Cleveland mobsters, Sam DiCarlo and John "King" Angersola, and Detroit gangster Joseph Massei. In 1949, Tronolone was convicted of operating an illegal gambling house.

Tronolone was a regular guest at Joseph Sonken's Gold Coast Restaurant in Hollywood, Florida, which was frequented by other mobsters such as Vincent "Jimmy Blue Eyes" Alo, Meyer Lansky, Anthony "Tony Jack" Giacalone and Hyman "Pittsburgh Hymie" Martin, as well as entertainers including Cary Grant, Audrey Meadows, Frank Sinatra and Sammy Davis Jr., and the boxer Rocky Marciano. Tronolone maintained his family responsibilities from his residence in Florida, where he also operated a travel agency, Peter Pan World Travel Inc., in North Miami.

In 1971, Tronolone was sentenced to two years’ probation and fined $1,000 after he was convicted of operating an illegal gambling business in Dade County. In 1975, he was convicted of operating a bookmaking operation with an estimated weekly income exceeding $1 million; Tronolone was sentenced to two years imprisonment with a $2,000 fine.

In the late 1970s, Tronolone became the consigliere, or counselor, of the Cleveland family. In this capacity, he frequently served as facilitator between the Cleveland family and the Mafia Commission in New York. Since Cleveland was not a Commission member, their interests were served by front boss Anthony "Fat Tony" Salerno from the Genovese family. Tronolone spent so much time with Salerno that he once joked to Cleveland underboss Angelo "Big Ange" Lonardo that he considered himself a member of both the Cleveland family and the Genovese family. Tronolone also helped Salerno with other important jobs. On March 21, 1980, Angelo Bruno, the boss of the Philadelphia family, was killed by rivals within his crime family. The Commission, upset with Bruno's unsanctioned murder, issued a death edict for Philadelphia gangster John "Johnny Keys" Simone. Aware that he was in trouble, Simone traveled to Florida to ask Tronolone to intercede for him with Salerno. Tronolone called Salerno, who told him that Simone's fate was sealed. At Salerno's request, Tronolone assured Simone that everything was now OK and that he should return to New York and talk to Salerno. The reassured Simone returned to New York, where his body was discovered on September 19, 1980 after he was shot execution-style.

=== Crime boss ===
In October 1983, acting boss Angelo Lonardo became a protected federal witness against Tronolone and other Cleveland family members. Tronolone succeeded Lonardo acting boss. After the death of James Licavoli in November 1985, Tronolone became the permanent boss of the weakened Cleveland family.

On March 21, 1986, Tronolone and 14 other mobsters were indicted on federal racketeering charges, including 29 counts of conspiracy to murder, labor racketeering, illegal gambling, bid rigging for local food and construction industries, and conspiracy to defraud the Teamsters Union through election fraud. He and three others were accused of fixing the election of Teamsters general president Jackie Presser in 1983. Tronolone was also charged with conspiring to murder John Simone as a result of Lonardo's testimony regarding Tronolone's role in the 1980 killing. On May 4, 1988, he was acquitted of all charges in Federal District Court in Manhattan.

Tronolone, a great-grandfather of nine with a pacemaker and cataracts, lived in a two-bedroom apartment in North Miami. James Neff, the senior editor of Cleveland Magazine, described Tronolone as a "senile bumbler" who had turned "the once-proud [Cleveland] crime family into a national joke". Investigators, however, alleged that he oversaw a loansharking and bookmaking ring in South Florida that handled as much as $70 million per year. Tronolone became the target of a sting operation by the Broward County Sheriff's Office Organized Crime Bureau after William Bale, an informant and convicted bookmaker who was $18,000 in debt to Miami Beach loan shark and newsstand owner Fred Koran, was told by Koran that Tronolone was the financier of his loansharking operation.

Acting on the instructions of Broward County deputy Lt. Dave Green, Bale told Koran that he had a new partner, "Jack Roper", a purported outlaw biker and gun shop owner, who would repay the debt. On January 29, 1989, Green, while undercover as Roper, accompanied Bale during a meeting with Tronolone in the parking lot of the Gulfstream Diner in Hallandale Beach. Green first offered to settle Bale's debt by paying Tronolone with a kilogram of cocaine, which Tronolone adamantly refused. Green then instead offered diamonds and other gems purportedly stolen in a jewel heist in Europe, to which Tronolone hastily accepted. Tronolone explained he could fence the jewelry though an associate who was about to embark for Australia. On February 9, 1989, Tronolone met Green, who was disguised as a member of the Outlaws Motorcycle Club, in the same parking lot and was arrested after he personally accepted a bag containing $77,000 worth of diamonds, rubies and gold which had been provided by the Federal Bureau of Investigation (FBI). Tronolone became the only Mafia boss to have the distinction of being arrested in a hand-to-hand undercover transaction by local law enforcement. He was charged with racketeering, bookmaking, bookmaking conspiracy, loansharking and dealing in stolen property, and held at Broward County Jail in lieu of a $1 million bail.

Tronolone went on trial in Broward County on charges of racketeering, loansharking and receiving stolen property beginning in August 1990. In October 1990, he was convicted of two counts of racketeering and three other felony charges. In December 1990, he was sentenced to nine years' imprisonment but allowed to remain free on a $250,000 bail while he appealed his conviction.

== Death ==
Before he could start his nine-year state-prison sentence, Tronolone died of complications from a heart condition at a hospital in Miami Beach on May 29, 1991, at the age of 80. A funeral mass was held for him at St. Joseph Catholic Church in Miami Beach.
