= Sáros County =

County of the Kingdom of Hungary

Sáros County Comitatus Sarossiensis (Latin) Sáros vármegye (Hungarian) Komitat Scharosch (German) Šarišská župa (Slovak)
- County of the Kingdom of Hungary
- 13th century–1920
- Coat of arms

- Capital: Eperjes
- Area
  - Coordinates: 49°0′N 21°14′E
  - 1910: 3,652 km^{2} (1,410 sq mi)
- Population
  - 1910: 174,600
- History
  - Established: 13th century
  - Treaty of Trianon: 4 June 1920
- Today part of: Slovakia
- Prešov is the current name of the capital.

Sáros (-Hungarian, Slovak: Šariš, Latin: comitatus Sarossiensis, German: Scharosch) was an administrative county (comitatus) of the Kingdom of Hungary. Its territory is now in northeastern Slovakia. Today, Šariš is only an informal designation of the corresponding territory.

== Geography ==
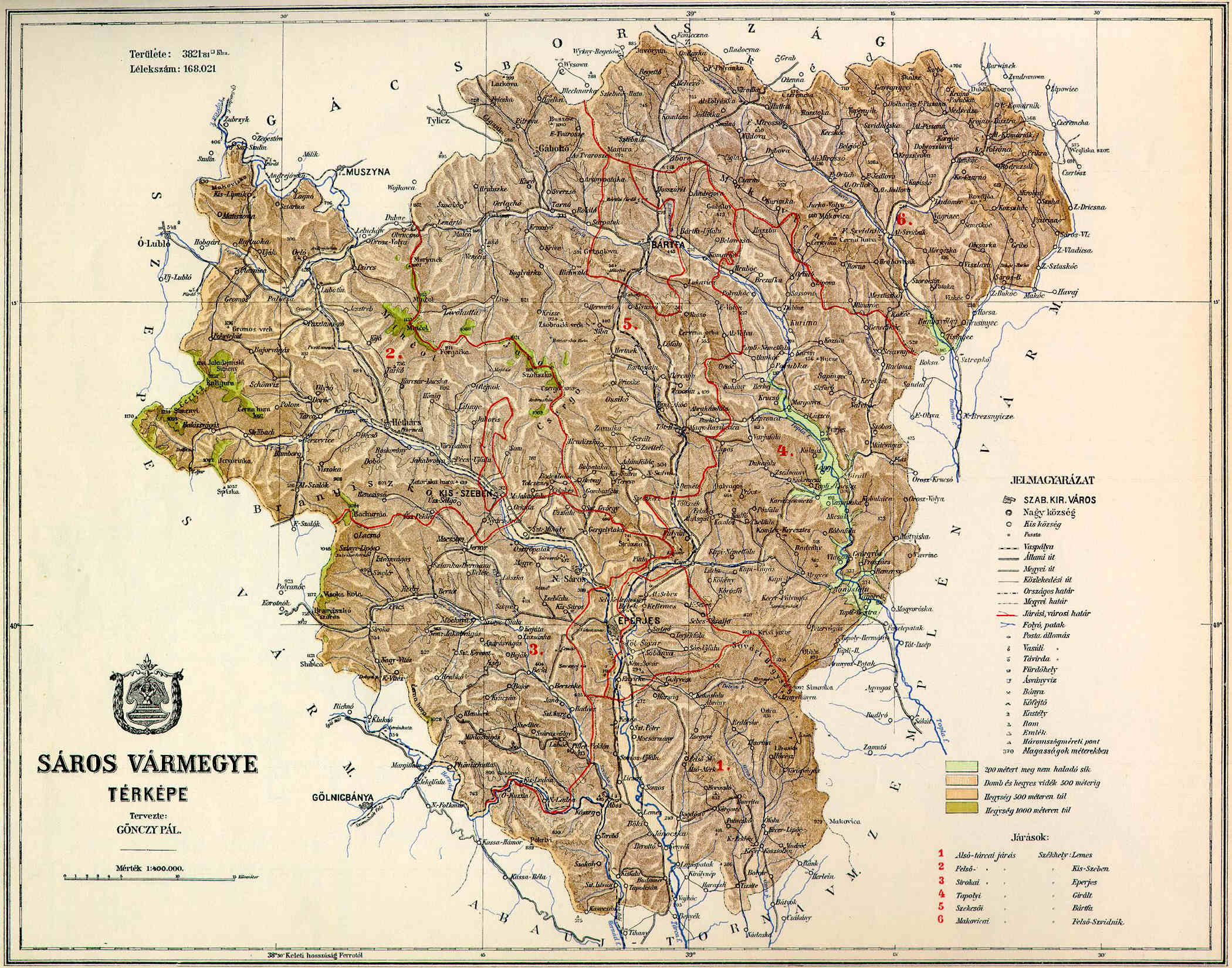
Map of Sáros, 1891.

Sáros county shared borders with the Austrian crownland Galicia and the Hungarian counties Szepes, Abaúj-Torna and Zemplén. It was situated between the Levoča Hills (i.e., Szepesség (Spiš)), Kassa and Felső-Szvidnyik. The river Tarca flowed through the county. Its area was 3,652 km^{2} around 1910.

== Capitals ==
The capital of Sáros county was Sáros Castle. After various other towns, since 1647 the capital has been Prešov.

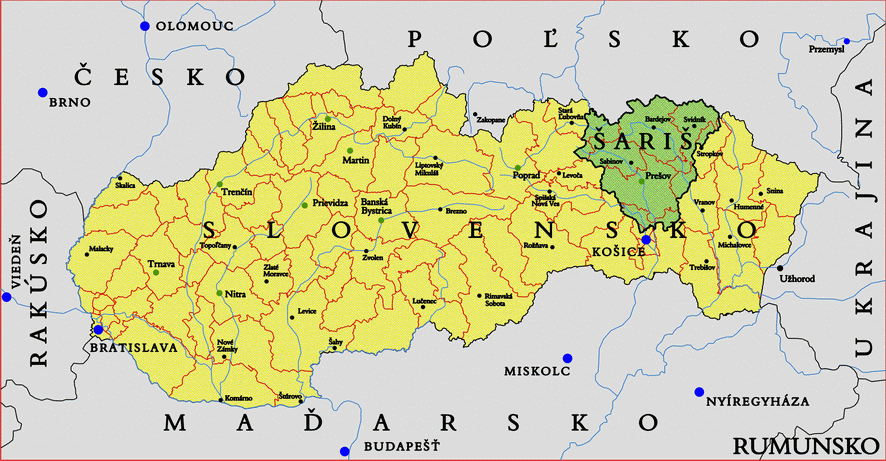
Former county of Sáros superimposed on map of contemporary Slovakia.

== History ==
Sáros county was created in the 13th century from the comitatus Novi Castri (Újvár County, named after Novum Castrum, today Abaújvár) which included also the territories of the later counties of Abaúj and Heves.

In the aftermath of World War I, all of Sáros county became part of newly formed Czechoslovakia, as recognized by the concerned states in the 1920 Treaty of Trianon. During World War II, when Czechoslovakia was divided, Šariš became part of the First Slovak Republic. Since 1993, Šariš has been part of Slovakia, located in the Prešov Region. Historically a prosperous region, it is nowadays relatively poor.

== Demographics ==
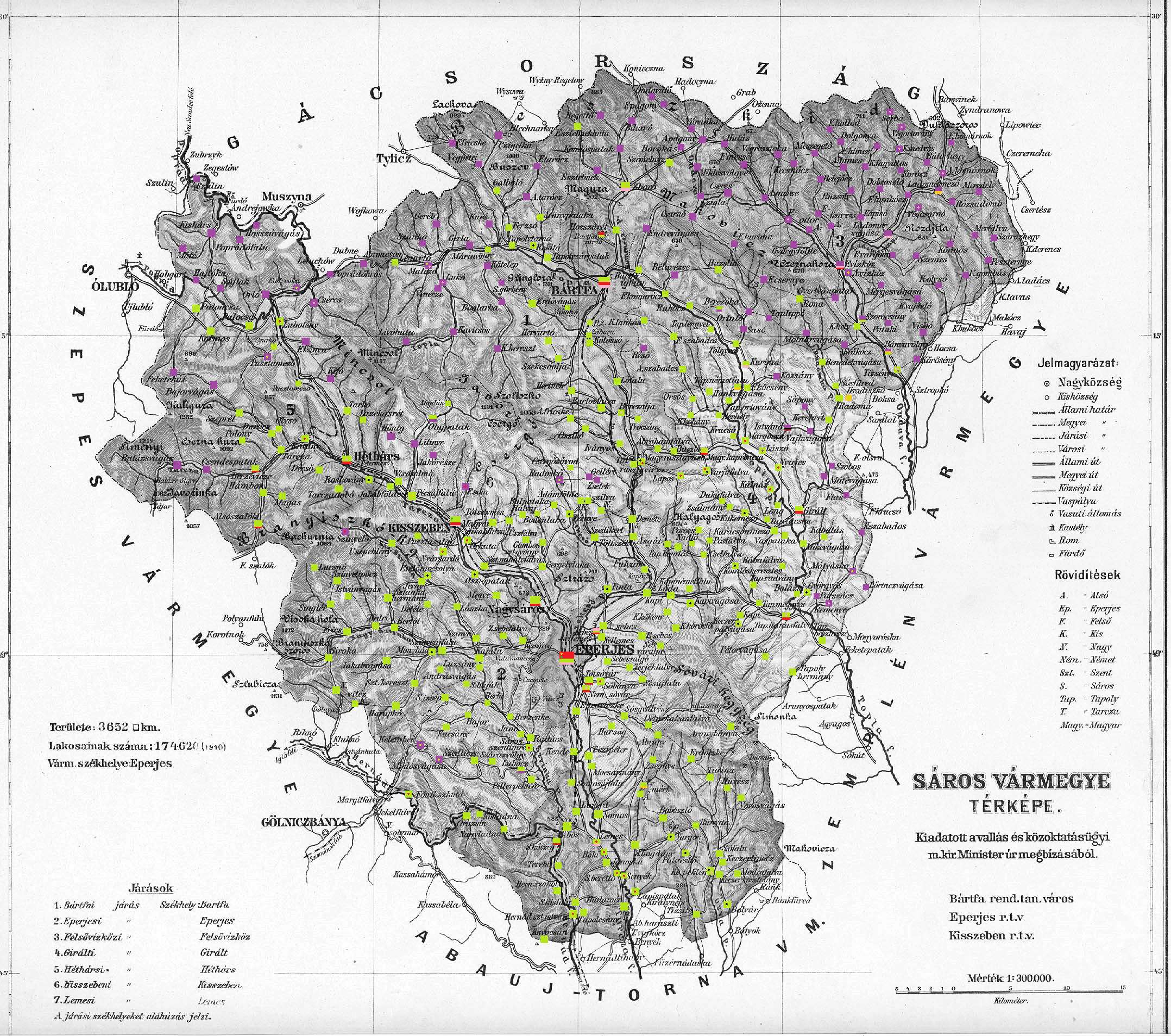
Ethnic map of the county with data of the 1910 census (see the key in the description).

Population by mother tongue (Note: Only linguistic communities > 1% are displayed.)
Census	Total	Slovak	Ruthenian	Hungarian	German	Other or unknown
1880	168,013	115,470 (70.84%)	30,898 (18.96%)	4,226 (2.59%)	10,699 (6.56%)	1,706 (1.05%)
1890	168,021	112,331 (66.86%)	35,019 (20.84%)	5,708 (3.40%)	11,811 (7.03%)	3,152 (1.88%)
1900	174,470	115,141 (65.99%)	33,988 (19.48%)	10,926 (6.26%)	10,886 (6.24%)	3,529 (2.02%)
1910	174,620	101,855 (58.33%)	38,500 (22.05%)	18,088 (10.36%)	9,447 (5.41%)	6,730 (3.85%)

Population by religion (Note: Only religious communities > 1% are displayed.)
Census	Total	Roman Catholic	Greek Catholic	Lutheran	Jewish	Other or unknown
1880	168,013	88,828 (52.87%)	51,361 (30.57%)	14,741 (8.77%)	12,735 (7.58%)	348 (0.21%)
1890	168,021	89,805 (53.45%)	51,855 (30.86%)	14,267 (8.49%)	11,822 (7.04%)	272 (0.16%)
1900	174,470	93,753 (53.74%)	53,434 (30.63%)	14,494 (8.31%)	12,262 (7.03%)	527 (0.30%)
1910	174,620	94,223 (53.96%)	52,938 (30.32%)	14,224 (8.15%)	12,323 (7.06%)	912 (0.52%)

== Subdivisions ==
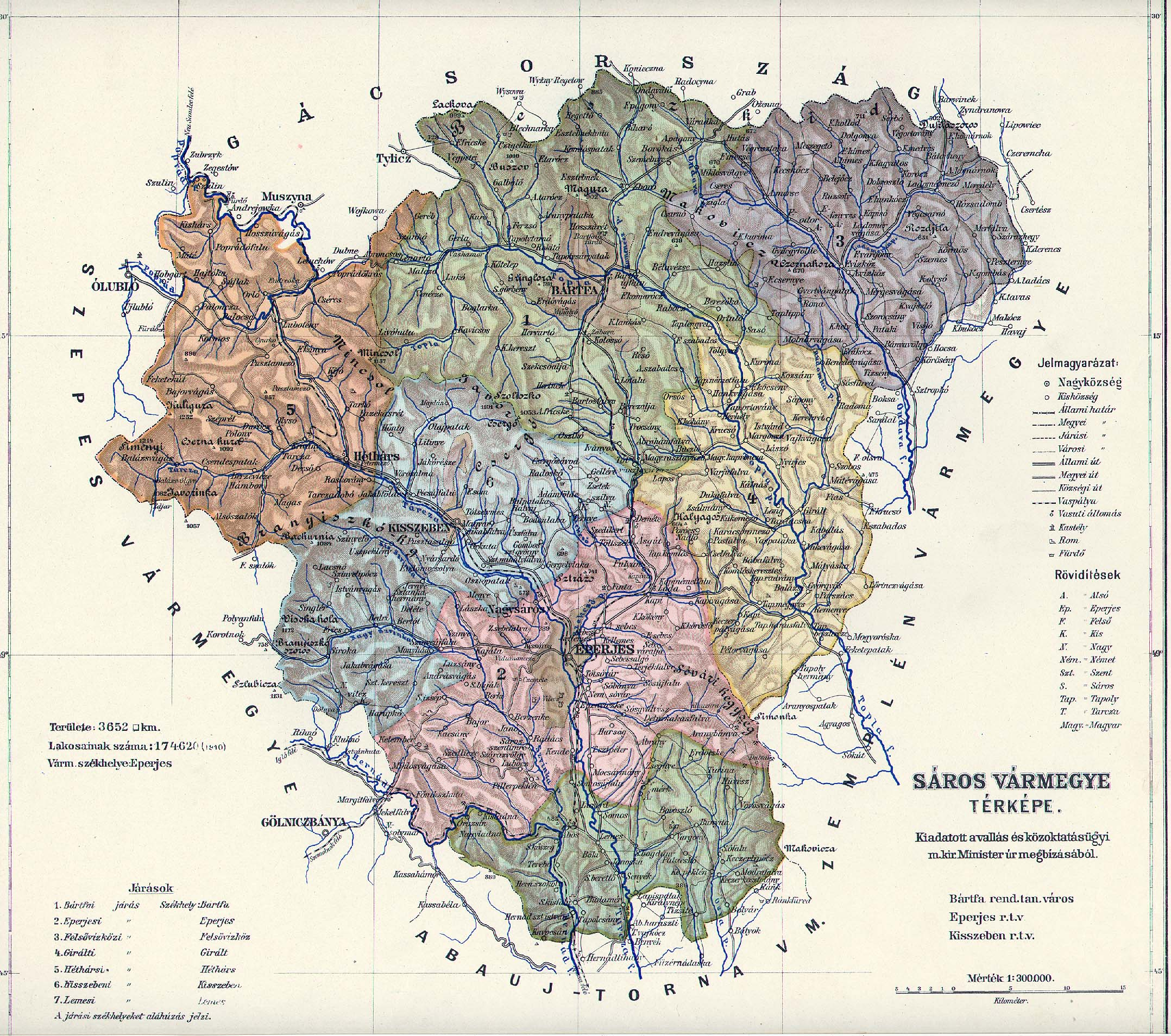

In the early 20th century, the subdivisions of Sáros county were:

Districts (járás)
District	Capital
Bártfa	Bártfa (now Bardejov)
Eperjes	Eperjes (now Prešov)
Felsővízköz	Felsővízköz (now Svidník)
Girált	Girált (now Giraltovce)
Héthárs	Héthárs (now Lipany)
Kisszeben	Kisszeben (now Sabinov)
Lemes	Lemes (now Lemešany)
Urban districts (rendezett tanácsú város)
Bártfa (now Bardejov)
Eperjes (now Prešov)
Kisszeben (now Sabinov)
