= Peter Licavoli =

American mobster (1902–1984)

Peter Joseph Licavoli (June 7, 1902 – January 11, 1984), (nicknamed "Horseface") was an American organized crime figure in St. Louis, Missouri before moving to Detroit, Michigan. He controlled criminal operations in Detroit and Toledo, Ohio, throughout the Prohibition era.

In the 1930s, Licavoli was convicted of bribing a federal official and spent two years at Leavenworth Penitentiary. He was arrested, tried, or suspected of murder seven times, and released seven times. His brother Dominic married Rosalie Zerilli, the eldest daughter of the Detroit Partnership boss Joseph Zerilli. In 1944, Licavoli left the Toledo-Detroit area for Arizona, living on Grace Ranch near Tucson, Arizona until his death in 1984.

== Family Relations ==
Peter Licavoli was born in St. Louis, and his first dealings with the underworld began when he, his brother Thomas Licavoli and his cousin James Licavoli joined the Russo gang. Pete was brought up in a relatively Jewish neighborhood in St. Louis. Along with his family, Licavoli dealt mostly in illegal gambling operations before moving to Detroit later during Prohibition. After their move to the Detroit Area, Yonnie and James would not be as lucky as Pete. Yonnie was arrested for being involved in the murder of a bootlegger in Toledo and James went into hiding and fled to Pittsburgh. Pete was left to continue gaining control in Detroit where he worked extensively with Jewish gangs in Detroit.

Not much is known of Licavoli’s early involvement in gang-life in St. Louis, but as he moved around the country, his list of known associates would bolster well known gangsters throughout the Midwest and even in New York City. Joseph Massei was a known associate of Licavoli in Detroit. His sister-in-law was married to Sam Zerilli, who along with Joseph Zerilli was a well known Crime Boss in Detroit. Pete was known to be a family man. He was accused of using political influence with US Senator Capehart. In the 40s, he pushed to pass a bill that prevented the deportation of his brother-in-law, Frank Cammarata. While Peter was never convicted, his relations with the Senator and the timing of the bill, were easily inferred to be underhanded dealings.

Licavoli’s cousin who he grew up with, James Licavoli, would go on to become a highly respected crime boss in Cleveland. He was a key figure in the Licavoli-Greene wars, that saw several bombings in Cleveland in the 1970s. However there is little information of any involvement that Pete had with this part of James' life.\

His youngest son, Peter Licavoli Jr. served honorably during a pivotal year of the Vietnam War. Here is the summary of his service based on the documentation Branch: US Army Unit: 864th Engineer Battalion ("Pacemakers") Location: Nha Trang, South Vietnam Timeframe: Served through the 1968 Tet Offensive period Rank: Promoted to Specialist E5 (SP5) Honors: Received the Good Conduct Medal and other citations Discharge: Honorably discharged in November 1968

== Dealings in Detroit ==
After moving to Detroit from St. Louis, Pete became established in the Detroit mob. He played a key role during Prohibition and was a part of many of the rum-running that happened during that time. During one of the runs in 1928, he bribed a customs officer to allow his gang to transport whiskey across the border from Canada. He attempted to pay the officer $200 and three bottles of whiskey to allow the rest of his alcohol to pass through the border. Later, in 1933, Licavoli pleaded guilty to the charge after evidence was brought against him by the officer he had bribed. The authorities sentenced Licavoli to 2 years at Leavenworth Penitentiary for this crime. Additionally, a witness placed him at the killing of Henry Tupancy, a man who was shot while sitting in his car, reading the newspaper. Police claimed this to be part of an Italian rum running gang war. Two additional witnesses changed their stories to object the fact that Licavoli had any involvement in the murder. In 1943, Licavoli and 4 other men were indicted by a grand jury after being accused of making false statements to the Alcohol Tax Unit of the Government. These charges were brought after police tracked 100 barrels of whiskey that eventually were sold to Detroit bars and case buyers. They alleged Licavoli was the biggest distributor of this illegal liquor after one of his associates was arrested in a garage with hundreds of cases of liquor.

Pete may have also been involved in the automotive industry. During his testimony in front of a Senate committee, former Ford employee Bud Holt spoke about events that took place within the Ford Service Department in 1935. He claimed Pete helped recruit employees to “take care of certain trouble”. According to Holt, Licavoli later demanded higher wages for his recruits, which would in turn lead to his financial benefit. Holt said Licavoli also forced Ford’s Personnel Director, Harry Bennett’s, car off the road after Bennett fired Licavoli’s recruits. However, Holt denied this claim during the hearing. Additionally, Pete was questioned during the Investigation of Organized Crime in Interstate Commerce by the Kefauver committee in 1951. They asked him about his occupation, criminal record, and associates. Licavoli refused to answer almost all of the questions, claiming his answer may lead to his incrimination. During the hearing, Licavoli denied ever meeting or having a disagreement with Harry Bennett.

== The Gotham Hotel ==
Peter Licavoli played an integral role in the organization’s gambling operations in Detroit as a boss of the Detroit Mafia, with the Gotham Hotel playing an extremely important part in these operations. Constructed in the 1920s, this building was originally the Hotel Martinique, an upscale hotel that mainly catered to the white residents of Detroit. However, following its failure to operate profitably, the building at 111 Orchestra Place was purchased by John White, Walter Norwood, and Irving Roane in 1943 and renamed the Gotham Hotel.

The three owners of the Gotham Hotel purchased the building with the purpose of transforming it into a luxury hotel for the African-American community of Detroit. Due to widescale discrimination in Detroit throughout the early 20th century, black residents of Detroit were often barred from residency at many of the city’s hotels. The Gotham Hotel succeeded in its goal of being a luxury destination to black citizens, in part to its exceptional location, classy decor, and top-of-the-class amenities. A measure of success and even an aid to business, the visits from African-American celebrities, like Jackie Robinson, Sammy Davis Jr, Billie Holiday, Jesse Owens, and many others, made the Gotham Hotel a well-known destination in the city. However, the success of the hotel was quickly undermined by the illicit activities of the Detroit mafia.

John White, one of the owners and operators of the Gotham Hotel, used the hotel as a front to run illegal poker games. Politicians and police detectives alike were frequent visitors of the hotel; as a result, it is presumed that those in charge of shutting down illegal operations, like the Gotham Hotel’s gambling ring, knew about its existence but chose to not act. This was the case until November 9, 1962, when “112 officers from the Detroit Police, the IRS and the Michigan State Police descend[ed] on the hotel”. The immediate result of this raid included the arrest of John White and 40 other people involved in the gambling, as well as “160,000 bet slips, $60,000 in cash (the equivalent of $473,000 today, when adjusted for inflation), 33 adding machines, marked playing cards and loaded dice.” Among those missing from the arrests that day was Pete Licavoli. Although never formally indicted or charged for his involvement, Peter Licavoli is assumed to be very involved in these gambling operations, due to his position in the Detroit Mafia and the discovery of his phone number in John White’s personal telephone directory. Seen as one of the most profitable and secure illegal gambling operations in Detroit, the fall of the Gotham Hotel operations deterred others in the city and led to the emigration of these operations to other cities.

== Out of the Game, Arrests, and Death ==
Peter Licavoli’s career with the mafia was not all booze and money—eventually he faced ramifications for his actions as one of the top bosses of the Detroit underworld. Throughout his career, he amassed 38 criminal charges ranging in severity. Licavoli was suspected of having a part in Detroit’s most sensational underworld crime of 1930 when Jerry Buckley, an American radio commentator, was gunned down in the lobby of the LaSalle Hotel in Detroit. Despite the seriousness of this accusation, Licavoli stood tough in court and eventually the charges were dropped for lack of evidence.

Violence was a recurring pattern in Pete’s career. He was questioned and eventually released regarding two other prohibition era killings of rum-running Joe Tallman and St. Louis gunman Milford Jones. Authorities credit him with killing at least 15 people between his days as boss of the Purple Gang and 1950, but he was never convicted of a single murder. Despite having 38 charges against him, Pete was only convicted for four of them: bribing a Canadian border guard during his rum-running days; income tax evasion in the 1950s; contempt of Congress for refusing to appear before a racket investigation and selling a stolen painting to an undercover agent.

Licavoli’s tax evasion conviction seems silly when considering the $150 million annual income stream of his enterprises. Despite this immense wealth, Pete underreported his income in 1956 by $29,000 ($343,000 in 2025 dollars). He was indicted for this by a Federal grand jury in September 1956. Licavoli entered a plea of no contest in 1958 and was charged with income tax evasion, resulting in a two and a half year sentence and $10,000 fine. In this trial, Federal Judge Theodore Levin rebutted Licavoli’s lawyer’s description of Pete as a "devoted family man and a diligent, hard-working, self-educated businessman," by pointing out that "Licavoli has been associating himself for 30 years with big-time, full-time, and old-time racketeers."

Licavoli’s criminal career was not limited to the financial sphere. Licavoli also pleaded guilty to conspiracy to bribe a federal customs officer. Judge Edward J. Moinet sentenced him to two years in prison and a $1,000 fine. This was the first crime Licavoli had been convicted of. Licavoli’s guilty plea came after an undercover government agent and one of the former customs officers that Licavoli was accused of bribing provided damaging evidence: Licavoli had paid Shell Miller, a former customs border patrolman, $200 and three bottles of whiskey in 1928 to allow his liquor boats to arrive protected from Canada.

Towards the end of his career, Pete moved to Tucson, Arizona, becoming one of Arizona’s wealthiest men. Licavoli purchased large amounts of land and commercial property in Tucson, including the Grace Ranch in honor of his wife Grace Bommarito. Grace Ranch served as the Licavoli family headquarters and became a safe haven for the mob for over 35 years. From Tucson, Licavoli set up the southwest gambling wire and supervised his Detroit rackets.

Even with his millions of dollars stored away, Pete couldn’t resist the urge to sell a stolen painting to an undercover FBI agent. It was a small painting with a low value, but Licavoli was a man always looking to move stolen property. He was tried by a federal judge in Tucson and given an 18 month sentence, a small penalty considering the US government had been trying to put him behind bars without success for over 25 years.

After a long career with the Purple Gang and a mere five and a half years spent in prison over his criminal career, Licavoli’s health began to deteriorate. He had cancer in remission and an inflamed liver. On January 11, 1984, at the age of 81, Pete Licavoli died of a heart ailment in his home in Tucson, Arizona. In his obituary, he is described by Senator Estes Kefauver as “one of the most cold-blooded and contemptuous characters to appear before their committee.”

== Contempt of Congress case ==
During their proceedings in 1958, the United States Senate Select Committee on Improper Activities in Labor and Management issued a subpoena to Licavoli, demanding he appear before them at the Senate Office Building to testify concerning their ongoing investigation "of racketeer and hoodlum infiltration into legitimate business and union enterprises." The subpoena had been signed by Committee Chairman, Senator John L. McClellan, and was served to Licavoli in the Detroit Federal Building on July 28, 1958, while he was on trial in Michigan. The subpoena informed him that any questions were to be directed to the Committee's chief counsel Robert F. Kennedy. The Committee demanded that Licavoli appear before them on the morning of July 31, 1958. A telegram was also sent to Licavoli at his Michigan home, on July 29, 1958, but he refused to take possession of it.

Kennedy's staff also contacted Licavoli's attorney, Joseph Louisell - whom the Detroit Free Press, would later describe as the "defense counsel in most of the sensational criminal cases that came into Detroit courts...[using] spirited if unorthodox courtroom tactics...he brought to each case relentless research, [and] a deep store of knowledge of the law." Louisell communicated to Kennedy that, as Licavoli was awaiting sentence in Michigan, he "doubted if Mr. Licavoli was going to appear before the committee." Licavoli was told, "that was no reason for his not appearing, and that he should be here."

On the day set for his appearance, the committee (including Senators Barry Goldwater, Irving Ives, and Sam Ervin) interrogated Irvin Paul Miller concerning whether racketeers in Detroit were trying to establish a base in the laundry industry similar to what they had done in the restaurant industry which was closely tied to illegal activities, including gambling and narcotics. Miller testified that Licavoli, Frank "The Bomb" Bommarito, Angelo Meli, and Joe Lehr (a partner in the Star Coverall Supply Company) met in a space he rented to them to open a business that would rent and clean coveralls, uniforms, and shop tools to gas stations, tool shops, and similar businesses. The men strategized their expansion which included the use of tactics such as threats and actual violence to intimidate small-business men, gas stations, and garages to rent from them. Kennedy then called Licavoli's name to testify, this was followed by the Chairman doing the same. The Committee noted Licavoli's failure to appear and his failure to communicate in any way with them. The committee then resolved to the U.S. Senate for a resolution for the U.S. attorney for D.C. to proceed against Licavoli for contempt of Congress. Miller went on to testify that he had received two threatening phone calls where an unknown voice told him "Well, when you go to Washington you should be very careful whose name you mention or who you incriminate." Kennedy pointed out "You mentioned Mr. Licavoli, and Meli's name, and Mr. Bommarito's name, and evidentially this didn't frighten you?" Miller replied, "Well, we have to go sometime." The Chairman responded, "Well, it takes that kind of courage to fight these crooks and murderers."

When tried for ignoring the Congressional subpoena in 1960, Licavoli claimed that in doing so he was following the advice of his lawyer. This defense made its way to the District of Columbia's Circuit court in 1961's Peter Licavoli, Appellant, v. United States of America. The Court found that just as "reliance upon [the] advice of counsel is no defense to a charge of refusing to answer a question, such reliance is not a defense to a charge of failure to respond." At the time of the ruling Licavoli was already in prison for income-tax evasion and received an additional sentence of six months for contempt of Congress.

In 2024 Licavoli's case was cited as binding precedent by judges in proceedings concerning the refusal to comply with a Congressional subpoena from the January 6th Committee by both Peter Navarro and Steve Bannon.
