= Thomas Licavoli =

American mobster (1904–1973)

- Born: Thomas Licavoli; February 9, 1904; St. Louis, Missouri, U.S.
- Died: September 17, 1973; Columbus, Ohio, U.S.
- Occupation: Gangster
- Relatives: Peter Licavoli (brother); James T. Licavoli (cousin)

Thomas "Yonnie" Licavoli (February 9, 1904 – September 17, 1973) was an American gangster and bootlegger during Prohibition. Born in St. Louis, Missouri, Licavoli, along with brother Peter Joseph Licavoli and cousin James Licavoli, worked with Jewish gangsters to take over illegal gambling in St. Louis. The Licavolis soon moved on to Detroit, Michigan and would control criminal operations in Detroit and Toledo, Ohio, throughout the Prohibition era.

== Early years ==
The second of four children of Sicilian immigrants, Licavoli grew up in the Jewish slums of St. Louis. Licavoli's parents wanted him to become a Catholic priest, so he enrolled in Christian Brothers College High School in St. Louis to study for the priesthood. When he was 19, Licavoli was arrested for carrying a concealed weapon, and decided to join the US Navy rather than go to prison. However, soon after completing his basic training Licavoli deserted. Rather than face the legal and gang-related problems facing him in St. Louis, Licavoli followed his brother Peter Joseph to Detroit, Michigan. Once in Detroit, he joined the infamous Purple Gang. Licavoli married Zena Moceri and had two daughters, Grace and Concetti.

== Bootlegging ==
Licavoli quickly rose through the ranks of the criminal world and by the mid-1920s was one of the most powerful gangsters in Detroit. With Prohibition as the law, Licavoli and his brother Peter Joseph had established themselves as a formidable force in the Detroit underworld. Well known for their brutal tactics in dealing with rivals, the brothers soon controlled a large-scale operation smuggling liquor from Canada across the Detroit River to the United States. In 1927, Licavoli and his associate Frank Cammerata were convicted of carrying a concealed weapon in Windsor, Ontario and served three years imprisonment in Canada.

After Licavoli's release from Canadian prison in 1930, the family attempted to expand its liquor operations to Toledo, Ohio. However, they were met with stiff resistance from local bootlegger Jack Kennedy. The two sides fought a violent gang war which would eventually end in Kennedy's death in July 1933. Licavoli's gang may have been involved in the death of "Gentleman Jimmy" Hayes, who operated casinos, in Ohio and Michigan. Licavoli was arrested for conspiracy to commit murder in the slayings of Kennedy and three others. Convicted in 1934, Licavoli was sentenced to life imprisonment at Ohio Penitentiary, despite attempts by Cleveland mobster Alfred Polizzi to secure him parole.

== Prison and death ==
In 1969, Ohio Governor James A. Rhodes commuted Licavoli's sentence from first to second degree murder, making him eligible for parole. Rhodes's decision, heavily criticized in the media, may have contributed to his defeat in the 1970 Republican primary election for the U.S. Senate.

In 1971, Licavoli was granted parole due to poor health. He retired to private life, living with his wife and daughter in the Columbus, Ohio suburb of Gahanna until his death on September 17, 1973. He is buried in Detroit, Michigan at Mt. Olivet Cemetery.
