= Lemešany =

- Municipality
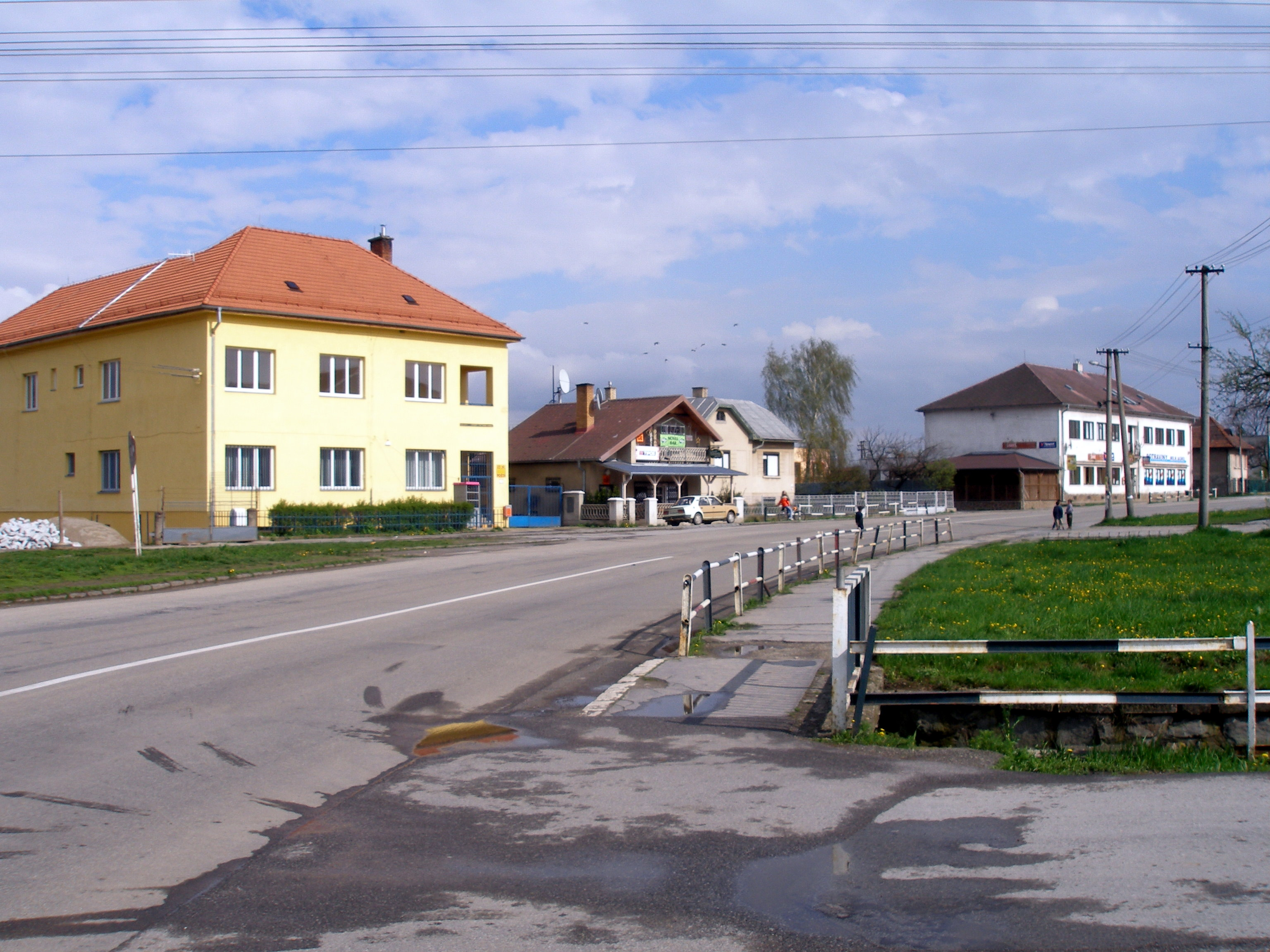

- Flag

- Location of Lemešany in the Prešov Region Location of Lemešany in Slovakia
- Coordinates: 48.85°N 21.27°E
- Country: Slovakia
- Region: Prešov Region
- District: Prešov District
- First mentioned: 1289

Area
  - Total: 9.19 km^{2} (3.55 sq mi)
- Elevation: 229 m (751 ft)

Population (2025)
  - Total: 2,065
- Time zone: UTC+1 (CET)
  - Summer (DST): UTC+2 (CEST)
- Postal code: 820 3
- Area code: +421 51
- Vehicle registration plate (until 2022): PO
- Website: www.lemesany.sk

Lemešany (Hungarian: Lemes, Rusyn: Лемешані) is a village and municipality in Prešov District in the Prešov Region of eastern Slovakia.

== History ==
In historical records the village was first mentioned in 1289.

== Geography ==
The municipality lies at an altitude of 229 metres (751 ft) and covers an area of 9.19 km^{2} (3.55 sq mi) (2025).

== Population ==
Population statistic (10 years)
Year	1995	2005	2015	2025
Count	1661	1763	1908	2065
Difference		+6.14%	+8.22%	+8.22%

Population statistic
Year	2024	2025
Count	2046	2065
Difference		+0.92%

It has a population of 2065 people (31 December 2025).

=== Ethnicity ===
Census 2021 (1+ %)
Ethnicity	Number	Fraction
Slovak	1933	96.89%
Romani	416	20.85%
Not found out	102	5.11%
Total	1995	

In year 2021 was 1995 people by ethnicity 1933 as Slovak, 416 as Romani, 102 as Not found out, 12 as Rusyn, 5 as Ukrainian, 4 as Czech, 2 as Polish, 2 as Hungarian, 2 as Other, 1 as Turkish, 1 as Russian, 1 as German and 1 as Albanian.

Note on population: The difference values of population numbers in the table "Population statistic" and in the sections "Ethnicity" & "Religion" is caused by the use of various statistical methods.

=== Religion ===
Census 2021 (1+ %)
Religion	Number	Fraction
Roman Catholic Church	1586	79.5%
None	140	7.02%
Not found out	102	5.11%
Greek Catholic Church	83	4.16%
Evangelical Church	42	2.11%
Total	1995	

In year 2021 was 1995 people by religion 1586 from Roman Catholic Church, 140 from None, 102 from Not found out, 83 from Greek Catholic Church, 42 from Evangelical Church, 9 from Eastern Orthodox Church, 7 from Jehovah's Witnesses, 7 from Apostolic Church, 4 from Calvinist Church, 4 from Christian Congregations in Slovakia, 3 from Other, 3 from Ad hoc movements, 2 from Other and not ascertained christian church, 1 from Old Catholic Church, 1 from Islam and 1 from United Methodist Church.
