= James T. Licavoli =

American crime boss (1904–1985)

- Licavoli's 1947 police mugshot
- Born: Vincentio Licavoli; November 24, 1904; St. Louis, Missouri, U.S
- Died: November 23, 1985 (aged 80); Oxford, Wisconsin, U.S
- Resting place: Calvary Cemetery, St. Louis, Missouri
- Other names: "Blackie"; "Jack White"
- Occupation: Crime boss
- Predecessor: John T. Scalish
- Successor: John Tronolone
- Relatives: Peter Licavoli (cousin); Thomas Licavoli (cousin)
- Allegiance: Cleveland crime family
- Conviction: Federal RICO charges (1982)
- Penalty: 17 years' imprisonment (1982)

James T. Licavoli (born Vincentio Licavoli; August 18, 1904 − November 23, 1985), also known as "Jack White" or "Blackie", was an American mobster based in Cleveland, Ohio, who became boss of the Cleveland crime family in 1976. In 1982, Licavoli became one of the earliest organized crime figures to be convicted under the Racketeer Influenced and Corrupt Organizations Act (RICO Act).

== Early life ==
Vincentio Licavoli was born in St. Louis, Missouri on August 18, 1904, the third of four children of Dominic and Girolama Licavoli. They immigrated to the United States from Sicily and eventually settled in St. Louis. In St. Louis, James Licavoli, along with his cousins, Peter and Thomas also known as "Yonnie" were members of the Russo Gang.

On October 6, 1926, Licavoli was shot in the leg and arrested after a wild chase and shootout with St. Louis Police. Though he had fired on the police, Licavoli was charged merely with carrying a concealed weapon and even that charge was dropped. On August 9, 1927, on the outskirts of Chicago, Licavoli survived a "one-way ride" that claimed the lives of his friends, Anthony "Shorty" Russo and Vincent Spicuzza. Licavoli then went with his cousins to Detroit where, as part of the Detroit Mafia, they wrested control of the city's rackets from the self-destructing Purple Gang, previously dominant in Detroit. There, he was convicted of bootlegging and served a stint at Leavenworth. Upon his release, he joined his cousins in Toledo, where they had moved to avoid heat from the murder of a crusading anti-Mafia Detroit radio broadcaster, Jerry Buckley.

The Licavolis and their cousin, Calogero "Leo Lips" Moceri, did not remain in Ohio for long. Five members of the gang including Yonnie were arrested for the murder of a popular Toledo bootlegger. Peter Licavoli returned to Detroit and regrouped - his force retaining the original Purple Gang title. James Licavoli went on the lam and hid in Pittsburgh where he stayed with up-and-coming mob boss John Sebastian Larocca.

== Move to Cleveland ==
One of many in the Licavoli family to become involved in organized crime, James Licavoli first arrived in Cleveland in 1938. There he became good friends with Jimmy "The Weasel" Fratianno and Anthony "Tony Dope" Delsanter. Among their exploits at the time, they teamed up to rob northeast Ohio gambling halls. In 1940, Licavoli was made into the Cleveland crime family and quickly established control over illegal gambling and the vending machine industry in the neighboring cities of Youngstown and Warren, Ohio. During this period, Licavoli was a suspect in the murders of Jim "Mancene" Mancini and gambling slot czar Nate Weisenberg.

In 1951, Licavoli was called before the U.S. Senate committee on organized crime, known as the Kefauver Committee. Licavoli refused to answer any questions. He was cited for contempt but found not guilty.

== Rise to power ==
By 1970, James Licavoli had become known as "the king of the hill" - Murray Hill, Little Italy. He never married and remained a lifelong bachelor. He lived with a 70-year-old roommate who was also a bachelor and worked as a carpenter. Since his income had never been declared, he was even able to draw a monthly social security check.

Licavoli had been called "Blackie" while he was growing up in Collinwood. Now he was known in the Mob as "Jack White," an ironic reference to his swarthy complexion.

Despite his immense wealth, he had a reputation for being cheap and occasionally foolish to the point of embarrassment. Once at a local mall, he was detained by store detectives for switching the price tags on a pair of pants. After hearing about his background, the department store manager declined to prosecute. Another time, he was caught using slugs on machines. He also used stolen credit cards on vacations.

In 1976, longtime Cleveland family boss John Scalish died, leaving control of Cleveland's lucrative criminal operations, specifically the cities' Teamsters Union locals, up for grabs. Licavoli was Scalish's logical successor, although he was initially reluctant to take the position. With the backing of Anthony "Tony Dope" Delsanter, Pasquale "Butchie" Cisternino, Ronald "Ronnie the Crab" Carabbia and Eugene "The Animal" Ciasullo, Licavoli became boss of the Cleveland crime family within six days of Scalish's death in order to prevent infighting within the family.

== Cleveland mob war ==
During this time, Licavoli had to deal with Irish gangster Danny Greene trying to take control of rackets in Cleveland. Mafia associate John Nardi sided with Greene and switched alliance, strengthening Greene's criminal empire and giving him an advantage on the Cleveland family. This erupted into an all-out war with many of Licavoli's supporters being killed in the process.

These murders soon gained the attention of other criminal organizations, particularly the Genovese crime family of New York. Despite the war hurting the Cleveland family's reputation, Licavoli declined Genovese leader Frank "Funzi" Tieri's offers for help; he feared that the Genovese family would try to muscle in on Cleveland's criminal operations if he accepted. Licavoli also had to fend off interference from the Chicago Outfit. Outfit leaders Tony Accardo and Joseph Aiuppa finally declared their neutrality in the Cleveland gang war and ordered their subordinates not to assist Licavoli.

During the early phases of the war, Licavoli was on the defense. Although no attempts were made on his life, many of Licavoli's men and associates were killed in the war. This included one of Licavoli's most powerful allies, consigliere Leo Moceri, whose blood-stained car was found in a hotel parking lot in Akron, Ohio. Repeated attempts to kill Nardi and especially Greene failed. However, in 1977, things started turning in his favor. His men were able to kill Nardi with a car bomb. Later the same year, he hired Ray Ferritto to kill Danny Greene. While Greene was visiting the dentist, Ferritto parked his car attached with a car bomb next to Greene's. When Greene left the dentist's office and went to his car, the bomb was ignited, killing Greene. Licavoli would go on trial for their murders, but was eventually acquitted.

With the deaths of Nardi and Greene, Licavoli assumed complete control of criminal activities in Cleveland. Under Licavoli, the Cleveland syndicate successfully infiltrated the Federal Bureau of Investigation's (FBI) Cleveland branch. They accomplished this by bribing a female clerk to update them on organized crime investigations and provide the identities of government informants. In a later conversation with lifelong friend and FBI informant Jimmy Fratianno (described in Fratianno's biography The Last Mafioso), Licavoli commented "Jimmy, sometimes, you know, I think this fucking outfit of ours is like the old Communist party in this country. It's getting so that there's more fucking spies in it than members."

== Downfall ==
Ferritto was implicated in the murder of Danny Greene when the license plate of his getaway car was reported to the Lyndhurst police by an eyewitness, and he subsequently began cooperating with authorities. Fratianno soon became alarmed that Licavoli would discover he was an informant, so he quickly made a deal with the FBI to testify against numerous Mafia members so that he could be entered into the Witness Protection Program. With Fratianno's help, the FBI closed the leak in their Cleveland Office. Prosecutors now targeted Licavoli for prosecution under the newly created Racketeer Influenced and Corrupt Organizations Act. On December 5, 1977, Licavoli and seven others were arrested on charges relating to Greene's murder. When Licavoli was arrested at his home, police confiscated his cane with a long, hidden blade in it and $3,000 in his underwear drawer. On July 8, 1982, Licavoli was tried and convicted alongside John Calandra, described as Licavoli's lieutenant; Anthony Liberatore, Pasquale Cisternino, Ronald Carabbia and Kenneth Ciarcia, of federal RICO charges and sentenced to 17 years imprisonment.

On November 23, 1985, James Licavoli died of a sudden heart attack at Adams County Hospital, near the Federal Correctional Institution, Oxford in Oxford, Wisconsin. He was buried at Calvary Cemetery in St. Louis.

== In popular culture ==
Licavoli was portrayed onscreen by actor Tony LoBianco in the movie Kill the Irishman.
