= List of American mobsters of Irish descent =

This is a list of Irish–American mobsters which includes organized crime figures of predominantly Irish–American criminal organizations or individual mobsters from the early 1900s to the present. To be included in this list, the person must have a Wikipedia article and/or references showing the person is Irish American and a mobster.

== List ==
Name	Portrait	Life	Years active	Notes	References
Mickey Bowers	No image available	1901–1966	1920–1966	New York labor racketeer who, with his cousin Harold Bowers, was a major power on the New York waterfront though the ILA's notorious "Pistol Local" based in Hell's Kitchen.	
Edmund "Eddie" Boyle	No image available	1965–	1983–2003	Gambino crime family associate	
James J. "Whitey" Bulger		1929–2018	1952–1995	Legendary Boston mobster and former leader of the Winter Hill Gang	
Elmer "Trigger" Burke	No image available	1919–1958	1941–1956	New York City mobster and freelance assassin	
Jimmy Burke	No image available	1931–1996	1949–1982	New York mobster and associate of the Lucchese crime family, popularly known as "Jimmy the Gent", who is credited for organizing the Lufthansa heist in 1978.	
Dan Carroll	No image available	1883–1946	1920–1933	Organized crime figure who controlled in bootlegging Boston with partner Charles "King" Solomon during Prohibition.	
William "Dinty" Colbeck		1891–1943	1919–1943	St. Louis organized crime figure and one time leader of Egan's Rats	
Vincent "Mad Dog" Coll	No image available	1908–1932	1924–1932	New York mobster and freelance enforcer during Prohibition	
Eddie "The Butcher" Cummiskey	No image available	1934–1976	-1976	New York mobster and enforcer for mobster Mickey Spillane during the 1950s and 60s. Later served as a mentor for Jimmy Coonan and other members of the Westies.	
James Coonan	No image available	1947–	1962–1988	New York mobster and leader of the Westies during the 1970s and 80s	
Timmy Connolly (Note: Is of mixed ethnicity.)	No image available	1958–2020	1976–1995	Member of the Winter Hill Gang.	
Ronald Dermody	No image available	1931-1964	-1964	Boston mobster associated with Whitey Bulger. He was murdered after a failed assassination attempt on Buddy McLean.	
Tom Devaney	No image available	1929–1976	1960s–1970s	New York mobster and enforcer for mobster Mickey Spillane during the 1960s and 70s	
Eddie Diamond	No image available	1899–1929	1921–1929	New York mobster and brother of Jack "Legs" Diamond	
Jack Diamond	No image available	1897–1931	1921–1931	Philadelphia/New York mobster involved in bootlegging during Prohibition	
Arthur "Butchy" Doe Jr.	No image available	1959–2018		Boston mobster and son of mobster Arthur Doe Sr.	
George Donahue	No image available	1909–		New York labor racketeer	
John M. "Cockeye" Dunn	No image available	1910–1949		New York mobster and enforcer for labor racketeer Joe Ryan	
William "Big Bill" Dwyer	No image available	1883–1946		New York mobster involved in bootlegging during Prohibition	
William "Jellyroll" Egan	No image available	1884–1921		St. Louis mobster and co–founder of Egan's Rats	
Maurice "Mossy" Enright	No image available	1884–1920	1911–1920	Chicago labor racketeer associated with the North Side Gang	
Mickey Featherstone	No image available	1947–		New York mobster and member of the Westies	
Richie Fitzpatrick	No image available	1880–1905		New York mobster and member of the Eastman Gang	
Jimmy Flynn	No image available	1934–2022		Boston mobster and member of the Winter Hill Gang	
Danny Greene	No image available	1933–1977		Cleveland mobster involved in union racketeering	
Kevin Hanrahan	No image available	1956–1992		Providence mobster and associate of the Patriarca crime family	
Vannie Higgins	No image available	1897–1932		New York mobster involved in bootlegging during Prohibition	
Henry Hill		1943–2012		New York mobster and associate of the Lucchese crime family	
"Dapper" Danny Hogan	No image available	1880–1928		Organized crime figure involved in bootlegging in St. Paul during Prohibition	
Cornelius Hughes	No image available	1929-1966		Boston mobster and hitman for the McLaughlin Brothers with his brother Stevie Hughes	
Stevie Hughes	No image available	1927-1966		Boston mobster and, with his brother Corneilius Hughes, a hitman for the McLaughlin Brothers	
George Hogan	No image available	1952–		Boston mobster believed to be the Winter Hill Gang's present boss.	
Martin Kilbane	No image available	1950–	1968–1977	Cleveland organized crime figure.	
Owen Kilbane	No image available	1948–	1963–1977	Cleveland organized crime figure.	
Donald Killeen	No image available	1923–1972		Boston mobster and head of criminal activities in South Boston.	
Richard Kuklinski	No image available	1935–2006	1954–1986	Hitman associated with the DeCavalcante crime family and Gambino crime family.	
John Patrick Looney	No image available	1865–1947	1909–1925	Bootlegger and organized crime figure in northern Illinois during Prohibition.	
Edward "Eddie Mac" MacKenzie Jr.	No image available	1958–	1983–1990	Drug dealer and enforcer for James "Whitey" Bulger and the Winter Hill Gang.	
Owney Madden	No image available	1891–1965		New York organized crime figure involved in bootlegging and former leader of the Gopher Gang.	
James Martorano	No image available	1941–	1960's–1995	Younger brother of Johnny Martorano. Winter Hill Gang associate and member of the Patriarca crime family.	
Johnny Martorano	No image available	1940–	1964–1995	Hitman for the Winter Hill Gang and older brother of James Martorano.	
Michael Cassius McDonald		1839–1907		One of the earliest organized crime figures in Chicago.	
Joseph McDonald	No image available	1917–1997		One of the charter members of the Winter Hill Gang.	
Frank McErlane	No image available	1894–1932		Chicago mobster and partner of bootlegger Joseph "Polack Joe" Saltis.	
Thomas "Blackjack" McGinty	No image available	1892–1970		A Cleveland organized crime figure, McGinty was a member of the Cleveland Syndicate with Jewish gangsters Moe Dalitz, Louis Rothkopf and members of the Italian Mayfield Road Mob. The Syndicate operated casinos in Youngstown, Florida, and Northern Kentucky. McGinty and other members of the Syndicate were founders of the Desert Inn.	
Paul McGonagle	No image available	1939–1974		Boston mobster and founder of the Mullen Gang	
Eddie McGrath	No image available	1906–1994	1936–1959	New York organized crime figure who controlled the waterfront area and oversaw criminal activity in Hell's Kitchen during the 1940s.	
Bernard "Bernie" McLaughlin	No image available	1921–1961		Boston mobster and founder of the McLaughlin Brothers	
Edward "Punchy" McLaughlin	No image available	1917–1965		Boston mobster and member of the McLaughlin Brothers	
George McLaughlin	No image available	1927–		Boston mobster and member of the McLaughlin Brothers	
James "Buddy" McLean	No image available	1929–1965		Boston mobster and former head of the Winter Hill Gang	
Hughie Mulligan	No image available	1911–1973		New York mobster and organized crime figure in Manhattan's Hell's Kitchen during the 1950s	
Joseph Vincent "Newsboy" Moriarty	No image available	1910–1979	1923–1972	New Jersey mobster involved in the numbers racket	
James M. Murphy	No image available	1942–	1960s–1990s	Boston mobster and Winter Hill Gang associate. Placed on the Boston Police Department's "Most Wanted List" in 1970.	
Patrick Nee	No image available	1943–	1966–1984	Boston mobster and member of the Mullen Gang, later associate of Whitey Bulger	
Russell Nicholson	No image available	1931–1964	1961–1964	Boston police officer and associate of the Winter Hill Gang	
Myles O'Donnell	No image available	1904–1932		Chicago mobster and founder of the O'Donnell Mob	
Dean O'Banion	No image available	1892–1924		Chicago mobster and founder of the North Side Mob	
Carleton O'Brien	No image available	1913–1952			
Gordon O'Brien	No image available	1947–2008		Providence mobster and associate of the Patriarca crime family	
Edward "Spike" O'Donnell	No image available	1890–1962		Chicago mobster and leader of the Southside O'Donnells during Prohibition	
"Big" Jim O'Leary	No image available	1860–1926		Chicago organized crime figure involved in illegal gambling	
James "Spike" O'Toole	No image available	1929–1973		Boston mobster and associate of the Winter Hill Gang	
James M. Ragen	No image available	1881–1946	-1946	Chicago organized crime figure involved in bootlegging and illegal gambling	
Joseph Ryan	No image available	1884–1963	1927–1953	New York labor racketeer and organized crime figure	
Frank "Cadillac Frank" Salemme	No image available	1933–2022	1957–1995	Boston mobster and one time leader of the Patriarca crime family	
John "Red" Shea	No image available	1965–	1980–1997	Boston mobster and member of the Winter Hill Gang	
Frank "The Irishman" Sheeran	No image available	1920–2003	1955–1982	associate and freelance assassin for the Bufalino crime family	
Andrew "Squint" Sheridan	No image available	1902–1949	-1947	New York mobster and enforcer for labor racketeer Joe Ryan	
Mickey Spillane	No image available	1934–1977	1959–1977	New York mobster and head of Manhattan's Hell's Kitchen during the 1950s and 60s	
Joseph "Mad Dog" Sullivan	No image available	1939–2017	1955–1983	New York mobster and freelance assassin for the Genovese crime family	
Roger Touhy	No image available	1898–1959	1920–1933	Chicago mobster and bootlegger during Prohibition	
Frank Wallace	No image available	1904–1931	-1931	Boston mobster and leader of the Gustin Gang during Prohibition.	
Danny Walsh	No image available	1893–1933	1920–1933	Providence bootlegger and major organized crime figure in southern New England during Prohibition.	
Kevin Weeks	No image available	1965–	1978–1999	Boston mobster affiliated with the Winter Hill Gang and a later government witness	
Zachary Bates	No image available	1989 - Current	2008-2022	Boston mobster The "Irish Donn" Currently Irish Mob Boss And head of Irish family Organized crime boss and leader	
