= Irish mob =

United States criminal syndicate of Irishmen and Irish-Americans

- Founded: 1830s
- Founding location: United States
- Years active: Early 19th century–present
- Territory: United States: New York, Boston, Philadelphia, Chicago, Cleveland, Detroit, Milwaukee, Minneapolis, New Orleans, Oklahoma City, Rock Island, Southern Illinois, St. Louis, Toledo. Presence also in Canada
- Ethnicity: Primarily Irish and Irish-American, as well as Irish-Canadian
- Criminal activities: Assault, murder, bribery, counterfeiting, drug trafficking, extortion, fencing, fraud, illegal gambling, loan sharking, money laundering, prostitution, racketeering, robbery, smuggling, theft, arms trafficking
- Rivals: Italian-American Mafia (historically and depending on certain factions) certain groups historically of Russian organised crime (in North America); Aryan Brotherhood (in Oklahoma)

The Irish mob (also known as the Irish mafia, Irish-American mafia or Irish-American organised crime) is a collection of organised crime groups composed of largely ethnic Irish members which operate primarily in the United States and have existed since the early 19th century. Originating in Irish-American street gangs – famously first depicted in Herbert Asbury's 1927 book, The Gangs of New York – the Irish Mob has appeared in most major American and Canadian cities, especially in the Northeast and the urban industrial Midwest, including Boston, New York City, Philadelphia, Pittsburgh, Baltimore, Cleveland, and Chicago.

== United States ==
=== New York ===
==== Pre-prohibition ====
Irish-American street gangs, such as the Dead Rabbits (led by future Congressman John Morrissey) and Whyos, dominated New York's underworld for well over a century. Beginning in the 1880s and 1890s, however, they faced competition from gangs consisting of recently arrived Italians and Jews. The Five Points Gang (led by Paul Kelly) would rise to prominence during the early 1900s, strongly rivalled by the Hudson Dusters, the Gopher Gang, and others during the period.

In the early 1900s, with Italian criminal organisations such as the Morello crime family encroaching on the waterfront, various Irish gangs united to form the White Hand Gang. Although initially successful in keeping their Black Hand Italian rivals at bay, unstable leadership and infighting would lead to their eventual downfall. The murders of Dinny Meehan, Bill Lovett, and Richard Lonergan led to the gang's disappearance by 1925. The waterfront was then taken over by Italian mobsters Vincent Mangano, Albert Anastasia, and Joe Adonis. The Irish mob would re-emerge in USA's coal country and remain strong.

==== Prohibition ====
During the early years of Prohibition, "Big" Bill Dwyer emerged among many in New York's underworld as a leading bootlegger. However, following his arrest and trial for violation of the Volstead Act during 1925 and 1926, Dwyer's former partners were split among Owney "The Killer" Madden, the English-born former leader of the Gopher Gang, and Frank Costello against Jack "Legs" Diamond, "Little" Augie Pisano, Charles "Vannie" Higgins and renegade mobster Vincent "Mad Dog" Coll.

==== The Westies ====
The Westies are an Irish American gang hailing from Hell's Kitchen on the West Side of Manhattan.

The most prominent members have included Eddie McGrath, James Coonan, Mickey Featherstone, James McElroy, and Edward Cummiskey.

In the Irish/Italian Mob War of the 1970s, the Irish mob saw an increased threat from the Italian Mafia as the Genovese crime family sought control over the soon-to-be-built Jacob K. Javits Convention Center. Also around this time, a power struggle emerged between Mickey Spillane and James Coonan, a younger upstart from Hell's Kitchen. Since the convention centre was located in Spillane's Hell's Kitchen neighbourhood, Spillane refused to allow any involvement by the Italians. Although the Italian gangsters greatly outnumbered the members of the Irish mob, Spillane was successful in keeping control of the convention centre and Hell's Kitchen. The Italians, frustrated and embarrassed by their defeat by Spillane, responded by hiring a rogue Irish-American hitman named Joseph "Mad Dog" Sullivan to assassinate Tom Devaney, Eddie "the Butcher" Cummiskey, and Tom "the Greek" Kapatos, three of Spillane's top lieutenants.

In 1977 Spillane was murdered in a hail of bullets by assassins from the Genovese crime family. This prompted Coonan to form an alliance with Roy DeMeo of the Gambino crime family. The Genoveses decided that the Westies were too violent and well-led to go to war with and mediated a truce via the Gambinos.

Coonan was imprisoned in 1986 under the RICO act. Featherstone became an informant after his arrest in the early 1980s.

=== Boston ===
==== Prohibition ====
Boston has a well-chronicled history of Irish mob activity, particularly in the heavily Irish-American cities and neighbourhoods like Somerville, Charlestown, South Boston ("Southie"), Dorchester and Roxbury where the earliest Irish gangsters arose during Prohibition. Frank Wallace of the Gustin Gang dominated Boston's underworld until his death in 1931, when he was ambushed by Italian gangsters in the North End. Numerous gang wars between rival Irish gangs during the early and mid 20th century would contribute to their decline.

==== The Winter Hill Gang ====
The Winter Hill Gang, a loose confederation of Boston-area organised crime figures, was one of the most successful organised crime groups in American history. It controlled the Boston underworld from the early 1960s until the mid-1990s. It derives its name from the Winter Hill neighbourhood of Somerville, Massachusetts, north of Boston, and was founded by first boss James "Buddy" McLean.

While Winter Hill Gang members were alleged to have been involved with most typical organised crime-related activities, they are perhaps best known for fixing horse races in the northeastern United States. Twenty-one members and associates, including Howie Winter, Joe McDonald, Johnny Martorano, and Sal Sperlinga were indicted by federal prosecutors in 1979. The gang was then taken over by James J. "Whitey" Bulger and hitman Stephen Flemmi and was headquartered in South Boston. During the 1980s, Bulger's criminal associates were Kevin Weeks, Patrick Nee, and Billy Shea.

The present Winter Hill Gang operates in secrecy and often avoids drawing public attention and scrutiny. With the activation of RICO law, the Winter Hill Gang's ranks were quickly thinned with federal indictments against key players like George Hogan and Scott "Smiley" McDermott. The Winter Hill Gang quickly disbanded in the late 90s to early 2000s after many of the federal indictments failed to stick due to a lack of evidence and cooperating witnesses.

==== Irish Mob War ====
The Irish Mob War is the name given to conflicts throughout the 1960s between the two dominant Irish-American organised crime gangs in Massachusetts: the Charlestown Mob in Boston, led by brothers Bernard and Edward "Punchy" McLaughlin, and the Winter Hill Gang of Somerville (just north of Boston) headed by James "Buddy" McLean and his associates, Howie Winter and Joe McDonald. It is widely believed that the war began when George McLaughlin tried to pick up the girlfriend of Winter Hill associate Alex "Bobo" Petricone, also known as actor Alex Rocco. McLaughlin was then beaten and hospitalised by two other Winter Hill members. Afterward, Bernie McLaughlin went to Buddy McLean for an explanation. When McLean refused to give up his associates, Bernie swore revenge but was soon killed by McLean in Charlestown City Square.

The war resulted in the eradication of the Charlestown Mob with its leaders, Bernie and Edward McLaughlin, and Stevie and Connie Hughes all having been killed. George McLaughlin, the one who started the war, was the only one who survived by being sent to prison. McLean was also killed, by Charlestown's Hughes brothers, and leadership of The Winter Hill Gang was taken by his right-hand man, Howie Winter and mentor, Joe McDonald. The remnants of the Charlestown Mob were then absorbed into the Winter Hill Gang, who were then able to become the dominant non-Mafia gang in the New England area.

In the early 1970s, another mob war was taking place in South Boston between two other Irish-American gangs: the Killeen Gang, which controlled bookmaking and loansharking, and the Mullen Gang, which was made up of thieves. In 1971, Killeen enforcer Billy O'Sullivan was shot and killed outside his house. The following year, Donald Killeen was murdered and the remaining members of both organisations were absorbed into the Winter Hill Gang. One of Killeen's key associates was Whitey Bulger. In 1973, Bulger was appointed by Howie Winter to operate the South Boston rackets. Throughout the remainder of the 1970s, Bulger used his influence to have rival mobsters murdered. Among his victims were Spike O'Toole, Paul McGonagle, Eddie Connors and Tommy King.

==== FBI corruption ====
During the 1970s and 1980s, the FBI's Boston office was largely infiltrated through corrupt federal agent John J. Connolly, by which Whitey Bulger was able to use his status as a government informant against his rivals (the extent of which would not be revealed until the mid to late 1990s).

The scandal was the basis for the non-fiction book Black Mass and its 2015 dramatic film adaptation, and it was partially the inspiration for the film The Departed.

=== Philadelphia ===
==== Pre-prohibition ====
The prominent Irish street gang pre-twentieth-century were the Schuylkill Rangers headed by Jimmy Haggerty, whose boyhood home was located on Arch Street in the area between Eighteenth and Nineteenth Street known as "McAran's Garden".

After numerous arrests for theft and similar offences, Haggerty and Schuylkill Ranger Hugh Murphy were convicted of the robbery of a Ninth Street store and sentenced to ten years imprisonment on December 12, 1865. He was pardoned by Governor Andrew G. Curtin eight months later, in part due to Haggerty's political connections and his promise to leave the country upon his release, and lived in Canada for a brief time before returning to the city to resume his criminal career. Haggerty remained a major underworld figure in Philadelphia until January 1869 when he was arrested on several counts of assault with intent to kill; during his arrest, he shot the arresting police officer. He was caught trying to escape from prison but was later released on bail and fled the city. Staying in New York City for a brief time, he returned to Philadelphia in April to surrender himself to authorities after the wounded police officer had received "hush money". He won both court cases against him but was ordered at the second trial to return to the Eastern State Penitentiary by the District Attorney for violating the terms of his release. While his lawyers argued the ruling, Haggerty disappeared from the courthouse during a recess in what was suspected to have been a planned escape.

==== Prohibition ====
Daniel "Danny" O'Leary fought with Maxie Hoff over control of Philadelphia's bootlegging throughout Prohibition. Jack "Legs" Diamond was a prominent mobster in both Philadelphia and New York City.

==== Post–World War II and the K&A Gang ====
In the years following World War II, the K&A Gang was the dominant Irish gang in the city's underworld. A multi-generational organised crime group made up of predominantly Irish and Irish American gangsters, the gang originated from a youth street gang based around the intersections of Kensington and Allegheny, which grew in power as local hoods and blue-collar Irish Americans seeking extra income joined its ranks. In time, the group expanded and grew more organised, establishing lucrative markets in gambling, loan sharking, and burglary.

The gang moved into the methamphetamine trade in the late 1980s and expanded into the Fishtown and Port Richmond neighbourhoods. John Berkery, a member of the K&A burglary crew, became leader of the gang and was influential in expanding the drug trade. In 1987, Scarfo crime family soldier Raymond Martorano, Berkery, and dozens of others, were indicted for their involvement in a large methamphetamine ring.

=== Chicago ===
==== Prohibition ====
The successors of Michael Cassius McDonald's criminal empire of the previous century, the Irish-American criminal organisations in Chicago were at their peak during Prohibition, specialising in bootlegging and highjacking. However, they would soon be rivalled by Italian mobsters, particularly Al Capone and the Chicago Outfit.

The organisations existing before Prohibition – including the North Side Gang, which included Dion O'Banion, Bugs Moran, Hymie Weiss, and Louis Alterie; the Southside O'Donnell Brothers, with the McKenna Crime family; the Westside O'Donnell's (led by Myles O'Donnell); Ragen's Colts; the Valley Gang; Roger Touhy; Frank McErlane; James Patrick O'Leary; and Terry Druggan – most of them were in competition with Capone for control of the bootlegging market.

=== Cleveland ===
==== Pre-Prohibition ====
The Irishtown Bend (also known as the Angle), Haymarket (was located at the site of the Gateway Sports and Entertainment Complex), Ohio City, Detroit Shoreway, and Whiskey Island neighbourhoods produced prominent pre-prohibition gangs included the McCart Street Gang and the Cheyenne Gang. The Blinky Morgan Gang became notorious after a robbery led to the murder of Detective William Hulligan. The crime was extensively covered, in newspapers, and a reward of $16,000 was offered. Most of the gang was caught, in Michigan, after being infiltrated by undercover police.

Publisher Daniel R. Hanna Sr. hired Chicago gangsters James Ragen and Arthur B. McBride as heavies during the Cleveland circulation wars between the Cleveland Leader and Cleveland News verses The Plain Dealer.

==== Prohibition and the Cleveland Syndicate ====
Thomas Joseph McGinty known as Blackjack McGinty, was a former professional featherweight boxer, one of the city's largest bootleggers, and operated gambling establishments on West 25th Street as well as the Mounds Club in Lake County. The Mounds Club was repeatedly raided by law enforcement, including Safety Director Eliot Ness, and was eventually shut down in 1950.

McGinty was a member of the Cleveland Syndicate, which was also composed of Jewish gangsters Moe Dalitz, Louis Rothkopf, Maurice Kleinman, Sam Tucker, and Charles Polizzi the adopted brother of Alfred Polizzi, head of the Italian Mayfield Road Mob. It operated casinos in Youngstown, Northern Kentucky and Florida. John and Martin O'Boyle were also part of the Irish faction of the Syndicate.

The Syndicate had significant operations, in Newport, Kentucky and Northern Kentucky, which had eighteen casinos or gambling halls, including the original The Flamingo Hotel & Casino opens (1946), and Tropicana. A notable casino was The Beverly Hills Club, which had high-profile entertainment acts such as Frank Sinatra, Dean Martin, and Nat King Cole. These establishments were the precursors to the casinos built in Las Vegas. The Syndicate's reign, in Northern Kentucky, came to an end following a botched attempt to discredit George Ratterman, a reform minded candidate for sheriff and a federal crack down during the Kennedy Administration.

McGinty and other members of the Syndicate were founders of the Desert Inn in Las Vegas. He was also involved in Meyer Lansky's Hotel Nacional de Cuba in Havana, Cuba. McGinty held an interest in numerous race tracks, including Maple Heights, Fair Grounds Race Course, Thistledown Racecourse, Fairmount Park Racetrack, Aurora Downs, and the Agua Caliente Racetrack.

In the 1930s, James "Shimmy" Patton and Daniel T. Gallagher operated a large movable casino known as the Harvard Club at several locations on Harvard Ave. It could accommodated 500–1,000 people and was one of the largest casinos between New York and Chicago. It defied numerous raids until it was finally shut down by Frank Lausche in 1941

"Handsome" Larry Davidson a former prohibition agent, and Dan F. Coughlin operated a rum-running organisation on Lake Erie from Cleveland. The ring imported liquor from Canada to Cedar Point and Toledo and then distributed the alcohol to the Chicago area. The gang also had an overland route from Florida to transport booze. A member of the ring, Ollie Zess, bribed Coast Guardsmen to accomplish the bootlegging.

In the late 1930s, Arthur B. McBride launched a wire service that supplied bookmakers with the results of horse races. He also invested in the Continental Press and Empire News, both based in Cleveland and run by mobsters Morris "Mushy" Wexler and Sam "Gameboy" Miller. James Ragen, another friend and associate in the wire business, was murdered in 1946 in a Chicago gangland feud. A federal grand jury in 1940 indicted 18 people, including McBride and Wexler, over the supply of information used in gambling. The allegations were based on federal laws that forbade interstate transmission of lottery results; prosecutors treated the race results as lottery lists. He was never arrested or tried over his role in the business. McBride went on to found the Cleveland Browns.

==== Post World War II ====
In the 1960s and 70s, the Kilbane Brothers, Martin, and Owen Kilbane operated prostitution, gambling, and loan sharking rackets on Cleveland's east side. The Kilbane Brothers were convicted of murder for hire of Marlene Steele by her husband Euclid Municipal Judge Robert Steele. The Kilbane Brothers were also convicted of killing Andrew Prunella, a rival pimp and gangster.

==== Danny Greene ====
Danny Greene, was the former president of the Longshoreman Local 1317, who was ousted for corruption. He then became an enforcer for mobster Alex "Shondor" Birns. Also, Mayfield Road Mob underboss, Frank "Little Frank" Brancato employed Greene as muscle for the city's garbage rackets. Greene got into a dispute with a garbage hauler "Big Mike" Frato. Greene caused his car to be blown up. Following this Frato attacked Greene in a park and fired three shots, which missed. Greene shot and killed Frato during the attack.

Greene formed a crew known as "The Celtic Club." He moved into the vending machine racket, which was controlled by Thomas "The Chinaman" Sinto. His relationship with Alex "Shondor" Birns also soured after a dispute concerning a loan. Birns and Greene put contracts on each other. Birns was murdered by a car bomb, which was planted by a Hell's Angel member who was hired by a Greene associate.

John Scalish the head of the Mayfield Road Mob died, leaving a power vacuum. James Licavoli and John Nardi both attempted to take control. Open warfare broke out between the Licavoli and Nardi factions. Greene backed John Nardi's claim. The Licavoli faction had difficulty killing Greene and hired Ray Ferritto, a Buffalo gangster, to kill Greene.

The war was costly. Mayfield Road Mob Consigliere Leo "Lips" Moceri was murdered. John Nardi was killed exiting the Teamsters Joint Council 41 office by a car bomb. Danny Greene was murdered coming out of his dentist's office by a car bomb. During the war, 37 car bombs were used and Cleveland went by the moniker "Bomb City, USA." Throughout Greene's criminal activities he was a top-echelon informant for the FBI.

Ray Ferritto was arrested for the killing and flipped on the Mayfield Road Mob and other gangsters. This led to numerous arrests. During the investigation, Jimmy Fratianno, the boss of the Los Angeles crime family became a government informant. This was the first time a mafia boss became a cooperative government witness. Greene's story became the subject of the film Kill the Irishman.

Members of Greene's crew, Kevin McTaggart, Keith Ritson, Frederick (Fritz) Graewe, and Hartmut (Hans the Surgeon) Graewe went on to work in a drug ring with Thomas Sinito. The drug ring was a major distributor of marijuana and cocaine. The ring was responsible for 19 murders. Ritson was murdered while in the ring, McTaggart was sentenced to life and the Graewe Brothers were sentenced to lengthy prison terms. As of 2024, McTaggart remains in prison despite a push from attorneys and support from public figures in Cleveland.

=== Detroit ===
The Joseph "Legs" Laman gang specialised in the "snatch racket," which involved kidnapping wealthy bootleggers and gamblers. Many kidnappings attributed to the Purple Gang were committed by the Laman gang. The gang ran into trouble when it began kidnapping legitimate business people. During a ransom pickup of David Cass, a wealthy real estate dealer, the police arrived and Laman was shot and taken into custody. After Laman was arrested his associates executed Cass. Laman turned state's witness and the gang was broken up. Laman was sentenced to 30 to 40 years in prison.

=== Hot Springs, Arkansas ===
Owney Madden was a former bootlegger, who controlled the Hell's Kitchen rackets and owned several night clubs including the Cotton Club. Madden relocated to Hot Springs, Arkansas in 1935. Upon arriving he operated the Hotel Arkansas casino and a wire service. During Madden's time, Hot Springs became a gambling hot spot with ten large casinos, numerous smaller gambling dens, and off-track betting parlors.

=== Minneapolis ===
Tommy Banks operated an organisation known as the Minneapolis Syndicate that engaged in bootlegging. Kid Cann and his two brothers led a Jewish-American organised crime mob known as the Minneapolis Combination and as "The AZ Syndicate". Banks and Cann divided Minneapolis into territories with a handshake and worked side by side both during and after prohibition. Another powerful Irish-American gangster based in Minneapolis was Edward G. Morgan, alias "Big Ed", whom Paul Maccabee has described as, "a slot machine king and muckraking journalist for the Twin City Reporter scandal sheet", who operated in a close alliance with St. Paul-based Irish mob boss Danny Hogan.

=== New Orleans ===
An early prohibition gang, the Terminal Gang consisted of many from the Irish Channel neighbourhood, including Frankie Mullen, Harold “The Parole King” Normandale, and Fred Kelly. The gang was closely aligned with Democratic Mayor Martin Behrem and was named for the Terminal Station where many acted as livery drivers. The gang would rob fares as well as engaging in gambling, alcohol, and narcotics rings. The gang was decimated after the defeat of Mayor Martin Behrem.

William Bailey and business partner Manuel Acosta operated a bootleg and hijack gang during prohibition. In 1930, Bailey was murdered on the orders of New Orleans crime family acting boss Silvestro Carollo. New Orleans Police believed the killing was in retaliation for a liquor hijacking.

=== Oklahoma City ===
The Irish Mob established itself in the 1990s as an alternative to the Aryan Brotherhood for prisoners who were not white supremacist. The gang expanded from dealing drugs in prison to drug trafficking in Oklahoma, Kansas, and California. In 2015 they were involved in a deadly prison riot where four people died including two members of the Irish Mob, all charges were dismissed against everyone involved. In 2018 3 members of the Irish Mob would be arrested for intimidation witnesses in the deadly gang shootout between Aryan Brotherhood members and Irish Mob members near a motel in Oklahoma. In 2022 the FBI would claim to have effectively dismantled the Oklahoma Irish Mob's distribution system after a five year long investigation that resulted in 125 arrests. One of those arrested was David Postelle, brother of then recently executed inmate Gilbert Postelle. Both brothers where arrested and imprisoned for a quadruple murder they committed in 2005. In 2024, four Irish mob members were charged with maiming victims with machetes and hatchets in order to gain initiation.

=== Nebraska ===
Johnny Dolph led the Irish mob in Nebraska where they ran a forgery operation. He was sentenced in 2023 for a number of charges including putting a hit out on an alleged informant.

=== Rock Island ===
John Patrick Looney controlled gambling, prostitution, illegal liquor, extortion, and protection rackets in Rock Island. He studied law and was admitted to the Illinois Bar in 1889. He was a member of the Democratic Party. He operated a newspaper, which was used to blackmail opponents. He controlled approximately 150 gambling dens. The Looney gang entered into a war with William Gabel's gang. During the war, William Gabel and John Patrick Looney's son, Connor Looney, were murdered. Looney was later charged and convicted of the murder of Willam Gabel. He was sentenced to 14 years in prison and served 8½ years. Looney died in 1942 at a tuberculosis sanitarium in El Paso, Texas. Looney served as the model for John Looney, a major character in Max Allan Collins' graphic novel Road to Perdition. The character was renamed John Rooney and portrayed by Paul Newman in Sam Mendes' 2002 film adaptation.

=== Southern Illinois ===
The Shelton Brothers Gang was an early Prohibition-era gang that controlled bootlegging in Southern Illinois. The Shelton Brothers Gang and rival Charles Birger gang engaged in a war with the Ku Klux Klan that concluded with a shoot out at Herrin. The attack broke the back of the KKK's leadership and widespread bootlegging continued. The Shelton Brothers Gang engaged in a war with Charles Birger's gang that concluded, in 1925, when the Shelton Brothers were convicted of the murder of a mail carrier. In 1928, Charles Birger was convicted of ordering the killing Joe Adams, the mayor of West City, Illinois, a Shelton backer, and hanged.

=== St. Louis ===
Thomas Egan and Thomas Kinney formed Egan's Rats, a large organised gang. A rival Hogan Gang led by Edward "Jelly Roll" Hogan also operated in the city. The gangs engaged in the Egan-Hogan War of 1921–23, which resulted in the breakup of Egan's Rats.

=== Toledo ===
Jack Kennedy controlled bootlegging and operated nightclubs in Toledo. Kennedy became involved in a turf war with Thomas Licavoli's gang. An enforcer of the Licavoli gang and childhood friend of Kennedy, Joseph "Wop" English, killed Kennedy. Licavoli was arrested for conspiracy to commit murder in the slayings of Kennedy and three other club owners. Convicted, in 1934, Licavoli was sentenced to life imprisonment at the Ohio Penitentiary, despite attempts by Cleveland mobster Alfred Polizzi to secure parole.

Gerald James Hayes, known as "Gentleman Jimmy", Hayes moved from Cleveland to Toledo as a child and eventually worked as a taxi cab driver. He sold his interest in the limo business and operated the Villa, Ramona Casino, Hollywood Club, Point's Casino, and Club Manito. He also opened a few clubs in the Cleveland area. In 1934, Hayes was found murdered, in Detroit, where he had been watching a World Series game between the St. Louis Cardinals and the Detroit Tigers. His wife, Eleanor, continued to operate his casinos for several years following his death. There is speculation that Hayes was murdered by Thomas Licavoli's gang because he may have been called as a witness in Licavoli's Kennedy murder trial or the Licavoli gang was trying to take over his gaming operations.

== Canada ==
=== Montreal ===
==== West End Gang ====
The West End Gang is one of Canada's most influential organised crime groups. Active since the early 1950s and still active today, their rise to notoriety did not begin until the 1960s when they were known simply as the "Irish gang". Their criminal activities were focused on, but not restricted to, the west side of Montreal. Most of the gang's earnings in the early days were derived from truck hijackings, home invasions, kidnapping, protection racket, drug trafficking, extortion and armed robbery.

The gang, which is dominated by – but not exclusively limited to – members of Irish descent, began to move into the drug trade in the 1970s. They began to import hashish and cocaine and developed important contacts in the United States, South America and Europe with some members working out of Florida.

Since that time, the gang has formulated ties to the Montreal Mafia, the Cosa Nostra, the Hells Angels, and Colombian cartels.

== Fiction ==
=== Films ===
Irish mobsters appeared as characters in many early gangster films of the 1930s and film noir of the 1940s. These roles are often identified with actors such as James Cagney, Pat O'Brien, Frank McHugh, Ralph Bellamy, Spencer Tracy, Lynne Overman, and Frank Morgan (although Bellamy, Morgan and Overman were not of Irish descent), as well as stars including Humphrey Bogart and Edward G. Robinson.

- Underworld (1927), gangster Bull Weed (George Bancroft) befriends a down and out former district attorney "Rolls Royce" Wensel (Clive Brook); soon, the two begin fighting over the gun moll Feathers McCoy (Evelyn Brent).
- The Racket (1928), Chicago police Captain James McQuigg (Thomas Meighan) matches wits with bootlegger Nick Scarsi (Louis Wolheim), their rivalry threatens to uncover the secret mastermind behind "The Organization," the criminal syndicate running Chicago.
- The Public Enemy (1931), played by James Cagney, Tom Powers is a bootlegger whose older brother Michael (Donald Cook) attempts to reform him while he fights his way to the top of the underworld.
- Scarface (1932), Tony Camonte fights several Irish gangs in Chicago.
- Angels with Dirty Faces (1938), after former mob boss Rocky Sullivan (Cagney) returns to Hell's Kitchen, former childhood friend, Father Jerry Connolly (O'Brien) tries to save him from himself.
- On the Waterfront (1954), after witnessing the murder of a fellow longshoreman, Terry Malloy (Marlon Brando) must choose sides between his brother Charlie (Rod Steiger) and mobbed-up Irish-American union boss Johnny Friendly (Lee J. Cobb) against crusading priest Father Barry (Karl Malden) and Edie Doyle (Eva Marie Saint).
- The St. Valentine's Day Massacre (1967), Roger Corman's retelling of the St. Valentine's Day Massacre stars Jason Robards as Al Capone, Ralph Meeker as Bugs Moran, and appearances by George Segal and Jack Nicholson.
- Prime Cut (1972), Nick Devlin (Lee Marvin), an enforcer for the Chicago Irish mob, is sent to Kansas to collect a debt from Mary Ann (Gene Hackman) the owner of a slaughterhouse.
- The Sting (1973), grifters Henry Gondorff (Paul Newman) and Johnny Hooker (Robert Redford) attempt to swindle Irish mob boss Doyle Lonnegan (Robert Shaw).
- The Friends of Eddie Coyle (1973), Eddie Coyle (Robert Mitchum), a gunrunner for the Boston Irish Mob, becomes an informant; when the mob finds out, they send his friend Dillon (Peter Boyle) to kill him.
- Sorcerer (1977), one of the main characters is a member of an Irish gang and on the run following a botched attempt to rob an Italian Mafia crew.
- Miller's Crossing (1990), Irish gangster Tom Reagan (Gabriel Byrne) tries to prevent a gang war between Irish boss Leo O'Bannion (Albert Finney) and Italian boss Johnny Casper (Jon Polito).
- State of Grace (1990), undercover officer Terry Noonan (Sean Penn) returns to Hell's Kitchen to infiltrate The Westies, which include childhood friend Jackie Flannery (Gary Oldman) and neighbourhood boss Frankie Flannery (Ed Harris).
- Last Man Standing (1996), gunman John Smith (Bruce Willis) becomes involved in a gang war between an Irish gang led by Doyle (David Patrick Kelly) and an Italian gang led by Fredo Strozzi (Ned Eisenberg) in the small town of Jericho, Texas.
- Sleepers (1996), about four childhood friend Irish gangsters in Hell's Kitchen, Manhattan, New York City
- The General (1998), true story of Martin Cahill (Brendan Gleeson) who rose from petty criminal to lead of one of Dublin's most powerful crime gangs before being murdered in 1994.
- Monument Ave. (1998), in Charlestown, Massachusetts, a charismatic enforcer in the Irish Mob (Denis Leary) must decide whether to abide by the neighbourhoods code of silence when his boss (Colm Meaney) begins murdering members of his family.
- Southie (1998), Danny Quinn (Donnie Wahlberg) returns to South Boston and gets stuck between his friends, who are supported by one Irish gang, and his family, who are members of another.
- Gangs of New York (2002), starring Leonardo DiCaprio and Daniel Day-Lewis, about the criminal underworld of the Five Points neighbourhood in Manhattan in the 1860s.
- Ash Wednesday (2002), Edward Burns wrote, directed, and starred in this movie about Irish gangsters in Hell's Kitchen.
- Road to Perdition (2002), based on the graphic novel by Max Allan Collins, Irish American gangster Michael Sullivan (Tom Hanks) finds himself on the run from his former employer, Irish Mob boss John Rooney (Newman), after his son witnesses a gangland slaying.
- Dirty Deeds (2002), in 1969, Irish Australian gangsters find themselves pitted against rival Sydney gangsters for control of gambling.
- Charlie's Angels: Full Throttle (2003), Seamus O'Grady (Justin Theroux) is a member of the Irish Mob.
- Veronica Guerin (2003), based on the true story of a reporter who challenges the mob in Dublin.
- A History of Violence (2005), film featuring Irish American gangsters from Philadelphia.
- The Departed (2006), A Boston-set remake of the Hong Kong crime drama Infernal Affairs (2002) about two moles, one a cop in the city's Irish Mob, the other a mobster in the Massachusetts State Police.
- What Doesn't Kill You (2008), based on the life of director Brian Goodman, featuring two childhood friends who join a South Boston Irish American gang.
- White Irish Drinkers (2010)
- The Town (2010), a crime drama involving a gang of Irish American bank robbers in Charlestown, Boston.
- Kill the Irishman (2011), in Cleveland in the 1970s, Danny Greene, an Irish American mob boss and FBI informant, goes to war against Cleveland crime family boss James T. Licavoli.
- Killing Them Softly (2012), based on the George V. Higgins book Cogan's Trade, about Irish American gangsters plotting to rob a high-stakes card game run by the Boston Italian-American Mafia.
- Whitey: United States of America v. James J. Bulger (2014), a documentary about James "Whitey" Bulger.
- Rage (2014), Irish crime families go to war with the Russian Bratva.
- Black Mass (2015), a drama based on the true story of Whitey Bulger, who lead the Winter Hill Gang, which was based in South Boston.
- Run All Night (2015), an Irish American mobster (Liam Neeson) fights to protect his son from his former boss (Ed Harris).
- Cardboard Gangsters (2017), an aspiring DJ Jayson Connelly (John Connors) whose mother gets him immersed in the drug trade of Darndale, Coolock of Dublin
- The Irishman (2019), a drama about Irish American mobster Frank Sheeran (Robert De Niro) having conflicting loyalties to Jimmy Hoffa and Italian-American Mafia boss Russell Bufalino
- Kings of Coke (2022), a documentary chronicling the history of the West End Gang of Montreal
- The Irish Mob (2023), a drama about Irish mafia boss Val Fagan (Rob McCarthy) who gets to war with the narcotics police and rivals in Dublin

=== Television ===
- Oz (1997), the Irish American Bridge Street Gang led by Ryan O'Reily is one of the criminal organisations wielding influence in the Oswald State Correctional Facility
- Brotherhood (2006), set in Providence, Rhode Island and revolving around the alliance between two Irish American brothers
- Paddy Whacked: The Irish Mob (2006), a documentary tracing the rise and fall of the Irish mob
- The Black Donnellys (2007), a drama that follows four young Irish brothers in Hell's Kitchen and their involvement in the remnants of the Hell's Kitchen Irish Mob and its conflicts with the Italian-American Mafia
- Underbelly (2008), Australian drama series based on the Melbourne gangland killings
- Boardwalk Empire (2010), an HBO series set in Prohibition-era Atlantic City and featuring gangsters of various ethnicities, including Irish American gangsters. The Irish American mobster protagonist, Nucky Thompson, is loosely based on real-life American politician Enoch L. Johnson, who otherwise had no Irish ancestry.
- Madso's War (2010), a television film about Mike "Madso" Madden who is drawn into the underworld when a power vacuum opens following the departure of a mob boss
- Love/Hate (2010), depicts Dublin's underworld
- The Chicago Code (2011), set in Chicago, undercover police investigate corruption involving the Irish Mob
- Shameless (2011–2021), a Showtime series set in Chicago, of the dysfunctional Irish-descent Gallagher family with the patriarch Frank regularly involving his family in criminal enterprises and endeavours albeit amateurish and improvised.
- Copper (2012), Irish American street gangs are depicted
- In the seventh season of Sons of Anarchy (2013), IRA arms dealer Connor Malone goes rogue and eventually cuts ties with the organisation permanently and establishes an independent gunrunning syndicate with other former IRA operatives.
- Ray Donovan (2013), series about Ray Donovan, an Irish-American professional "fixer" and his family.
- Public Morals (2015), series set in 1960's New York as Irish mobsters try and take control of the city
- Daredevil
  - In the first season, Matt Murdock's father Jack, a professional boxer, is killed by the Hell's Kitchen Irish Mob on the orders of Irish American mobster Roscoe Sweeney after failing to take a dive in a fixed boxing match.
  - In the second season, a gang of Irish American mobsters, known as the Kitchen Irish, attempt to replace the Kingpin as the dominant crime family in New York, which brings them into conflict with the Punisher when he wipes out most of the gang's leadership in an ambush. Their base of operations is next to the Hell's Kitchen bikers club Dogs of Hell. The Kitchen Irish are loosely based on the Westies.
- Ozark (Season 2–present), depicts a fictional Kansas City crime family headed by Irish American mobster Frank Cosgrove.
- The fourth season of Fargo features an Irish-American gang in Kansas City and its downfall at the hands of an Italian American Mafia family.
- Kin (2021), tells the story of a fictional Dublin family embroiled in gangland war and speaks to the enduring unbreakable bonds of blood and family.
- Power Book IV: Force (2022), depicts the Flynn crime family, an Irish American criminal organisation based out of Chicago whom the protagonist; Tommy Egan, encounters.
- Peaky Blinders (Series 6) (2022), features the character Jack Nelson; a Boston-based Irish American gangster who has powerful connections in the U.S. government. He is the uncle-in-law of Michael Gray and a potential adversary to the cousin of the former; Tommy Shelby, the show's protagonist. The character is loosely inspired by Joseph P. Kennedy.

=== Video games ===
- Grand Theft Auto IV (2008) features the McReary Crime Family, an Irish crime syndicate operating out of Dukes, Liberty City (a parody of Queens, New York City). Originally one of the most powerful gangs in Liberty City, the McReary's have been reduced to little more than hired guns working for the Mafia and become one of the player's main allies and employers during the game. The McReary's are significantly weakened following the arrest of their leader, Gerald McReary, and by the events of Grand Theft Auto: Chinatown Wars (2009), they have been replaced by an unnamed Irish-American gang that plays no role in the storyline.
- In Watch Dogs (2014), the Chicago South Club is an Irish-American crime syndicate that dominates Chicago's underworld and is descended from Irish mobsters who survived the 1929 Valentine's Day Massacre. Led by elderly mobster Dermot "Lucky" Quinn, the club has recently expanded into human trafficking and the theft and sale of confidential information, using the city's vast surveillance network to expand their reach. Quinn, regarded as one of Chicago's most prominent citizens, keeps a vast payroll of city employees from prison guards to the mayor himself, and his lieutenants oversee illegal businesses including money laundering, drug trafficking, and contract killing. Following Quinn's death at the end of the game, the club is taken over by his son Niall.
- Mafia II (2010) features the O'Neill Gang, an Irish-American crime syndicate founded by Irish immigrant Jimmy O'Neill in the late 19th century. By 1945, they are led by Jimmy's grandson, Brian O'Neill, and are regarded as one of the most powerful gangs in Empire Bay, controlling the neighborhoods of Dipton and Kingston. The O'Neills typically work as hired muscle and are known for their rivalry with the Mafia. They are first encountered during a jewelry shop robbery, in which the player character, Vito Scaletta, manages to escape from the police while Brian and his cohorts are arrested. Vito later encounters Brian again in prison and kills him. Leadership of the O'Neill Gang subsequently falls to Brian's cousin, Mickey Desmond, who has his men burn down Vito's home as revenge for Brian's death, leading to Vito killing Mickey as well.
  - A different version of the Irish Mob called the Brodie Gang appears in two of the game's expansion packs, The Betrayal of Jimmy and Jimmy's Vendetta. Led by Tam Brodie, they hire the player character Jimmy to help them win a gang war against the local Triads, only to later betray him and conspire to have him arrested. After breaking out of prison, Jimmy exacts revenge on everyone responsible, including Brodie and his gang.
- In Mafia III (2016), the Irish Mob in the fictional city of New Bordeaux (based on New Orleans) is one of several criminal factions the player recruits to help them control the local criminal underworld. Operating out of a scrapyard/chop shop owned by Irish mob boss Thomas Burke and his daughter/underboss Nicki Burke, the gang's interests include bootlegging, drug smuggling, and gunrunning, and they can assist the player by providing cars, explosives, and interfering with police pursuits. In turn, the player can undertake special missions to boost their loyalty and unlock further perks.
- Red Dead Redemption 2 (2018) features the O'Driscoll Boys, a predominantly Irish-American gang led by infamous outlaw Colm O'Driscoll. While not a traditional urban Irish mob, the O'Driscolls are nonetheless a powerful faction, comprising hundreds of outlaws operating throughout the Old West. They are notorious for their ruthless violence, armed robberies, cattle rustling, and loansharking rackets and are the sworn rivals of the Van Der Linde Gang.

== See also ==
- List of American mobsters of Irish descent
