= Irish Americans in New York City =

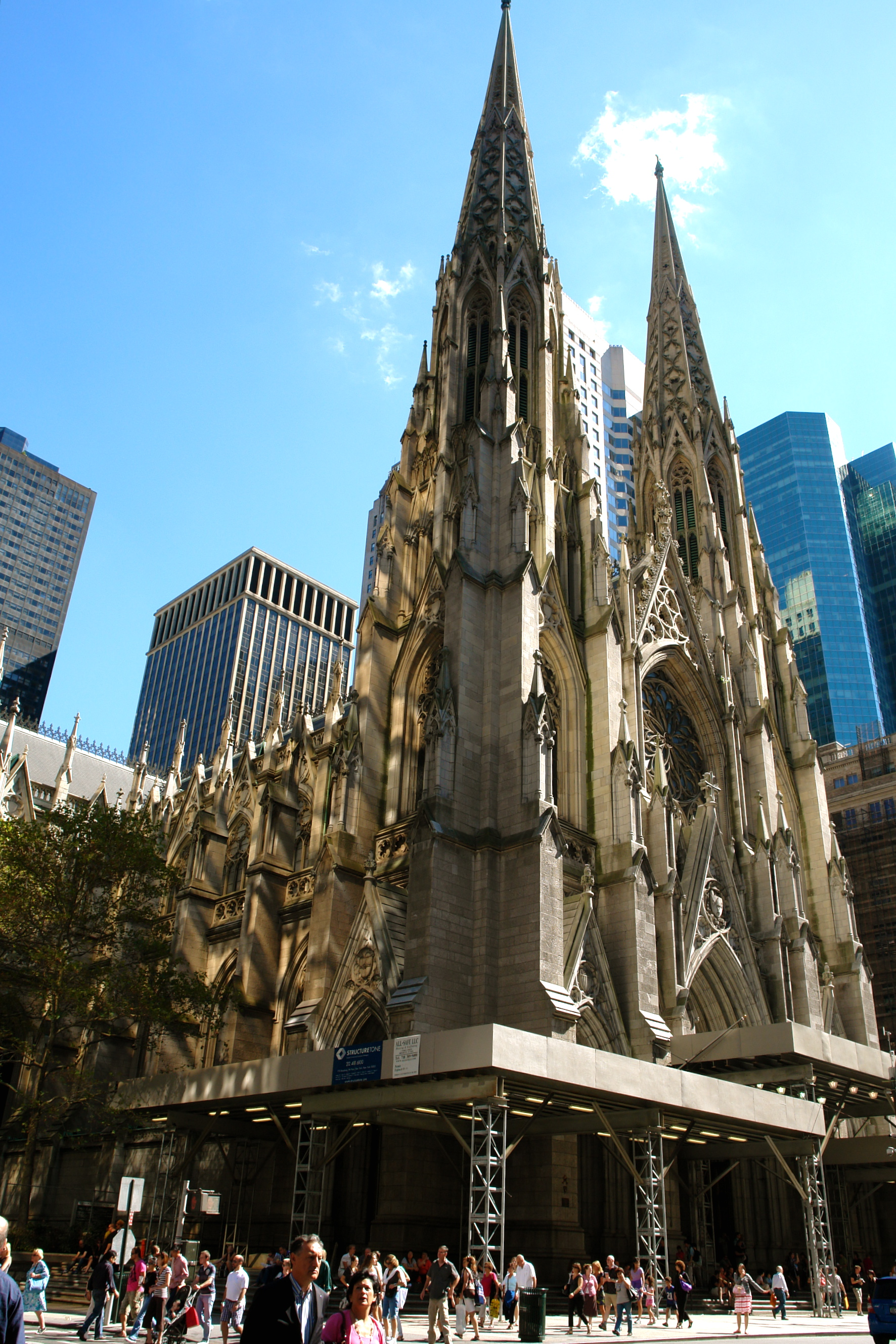
St. Patrick's Cathedral, New York

The Irish community is one of New York City's largest ethnic groups, and has been a significant proportion of the city's population since the waves of immigration in the late 19th century.

As a result of the Great Famine in Ireland, many Irish families were forced to emigrate from the country. By 1854, between 1.5 and 2 million Irish had left their country. In the United States, most Irish became city-dwellers. With little money, many had to settle in the cities that the ships landed in. By 1850, the Irish made up a quarter of the population in Boston, New York City, Philadelphia, Buffalo, and Baltimore.

Today, Boston has the largest percentage of Irish-Americans of any city in the United States, while New York City has the most Irish Americans in raw numbers. During the Celtic Tiger years, when the Irish economy was booming, the city saw a buying spree of residences by native Irish as second homes or as investment property.

== History ==
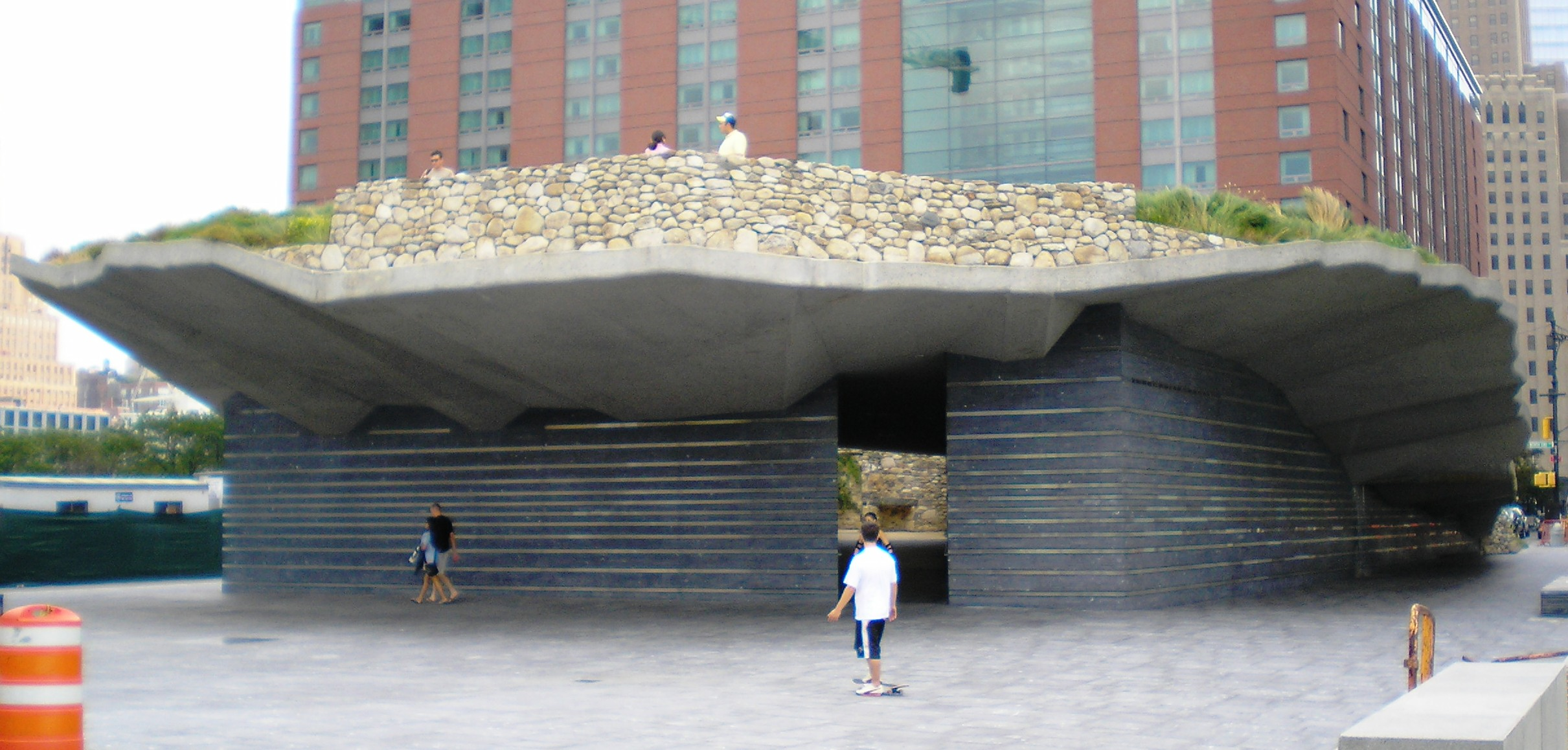
Irish Hunger Memorial in Downtown Manhattan

Irish Americans (most of whom are Irish Catholic) make up approximately 5.3% of New York City's population, composing the second largest non-Hispanic white ethnic group.

Irish American Protestants Scotch-Irish Americans first came to America in colonial years (pre-1776). The largest wave of Catholic Irish immigration came after the Great Hunger in 1845 although many Catholics immigrated during the colonial period. Most came from some of Ireland's most populous counties, such as Cork, Galway, and Tipperary. Large numbers also originated in counties Cavan, Meath, Dublin, and Laois. The Ancient Order of Hibernians, the largest Irish-American secret society, was formed on May 4, 1836 at St. James Roman Catholic Church in Manhattan. In 1850, a group of Hibernians prevented the burning of Manhattan's St. Patrick's Old Cathedral by a mob of anti-Catholic Know Nothings.

In the Civil War, the massive anti-draft riots of 1863, one of the most deadly acts of civil unrest in New York City, represented a "civil war" inside the Irish Catholic community, according to Toby Joyce. The mostly Irish Catholic rioters confronted police, soldiers, and pro-war politicians who were often leaders of the Irish community. In the "early days", the 19th century, the Irish formed a predominant part of the European immigrant population of New York City, a "city of immigrants", which added to the city's diversity to this day. After they came, Irish immigrants often crowded into subdivided homes, only meant for one family, and cellars, attics, and alleys all became home for the poorest immigrants. As they accumulated wealth they moved into better housing. Bay Ridge, Brooklyn, was originally developed as a resort for wealthy Manhattanites in 1879, but instead became an upscale family-oriented Italian- and Irish-American community. Another large Irish-American community is located in Woodlawn Heights, Bronx, but Woodlawn Heights also has a mix of different ethnic groups. Conditions were slow to improve in Manhattan's Hell's Kitchen.

Other sizable Irish-American communities include Belle Harbor and Breezy Point, both in Queens. Two big Irish communities are Marine Park and neighboring Gerritsen Beach. The Irish have also settled "to a far lesser extent [in] Maspeth, Woodside, and Sunnyside, Queens."

The Irish Catholic men were successful in joining the New York City Police Department (NYPD) as well as the New York Fire Department (FDNY). Religious women became nuns teaching in parochial schools; others became public school teachers. In the neighborhoods, the Irish organized to again control over territory, jobs, and political organizations. As the "new immigrants" from Southern and Eastern Europe arrived 1880s-1914, the Irish incorporating them into their established system. It was a process of "Americanization." The Irish dominated the Catholic Church as bishops, priests, pastors and nuns. The Church worked hard to keep Catholicism strong among the new arrivals, opening parish schools and high schools. After 1945, a large-scale movement to the suburbs was made possible by the steady upward social mobility of the Irish.

In the 20th century, the Irish-American proportion of first responders in New York grew so large that a nationwide stereotype began to form of Irish-Americans as police officers and firemen. Pipe bands have continued to play at funerals for police officers regardless of ethnicity into the 21st century. On September 11, 2001, 40% of the 343 firefighters who died had Irish ancestry. According to George Pataki, NYPD Commissioner Bernard Kerik told Brian Cowen during a visit to Ground Zero that 200 claddagh rings had been recovered from the site.

== Irish colleges and universities ==
Fordham University was founded by Archbishop John Hughes an Irish immigrant, and built by Irish labor. Most of the Jesuits are Irish-Americans and Irish Americans make up a sizeable amount of the student body. The University president Rev. Joseph McShane, SJ is an Irish American.

St. John's University was founded by Bishop John Laughlin an Irish immigrant aiming to educate Irish and other immigrants in a strong Catholic atmosphere. Almost every president of the University has been an Irish American, and many of the Vincentian priests that run the University are Irish as well as lay staff and professors. The University president Rev. Brian Shanley, OP is an Irish American.

At Manhattan University, many of the students, staff and professors are Irish American. Its athletic teams are named the Jaspers, in honor of Brother Jasper of Mary, an Irish immigrant, administrator at the school and inventor of the seventh inning stretch.

== Irish neighborhoods ==
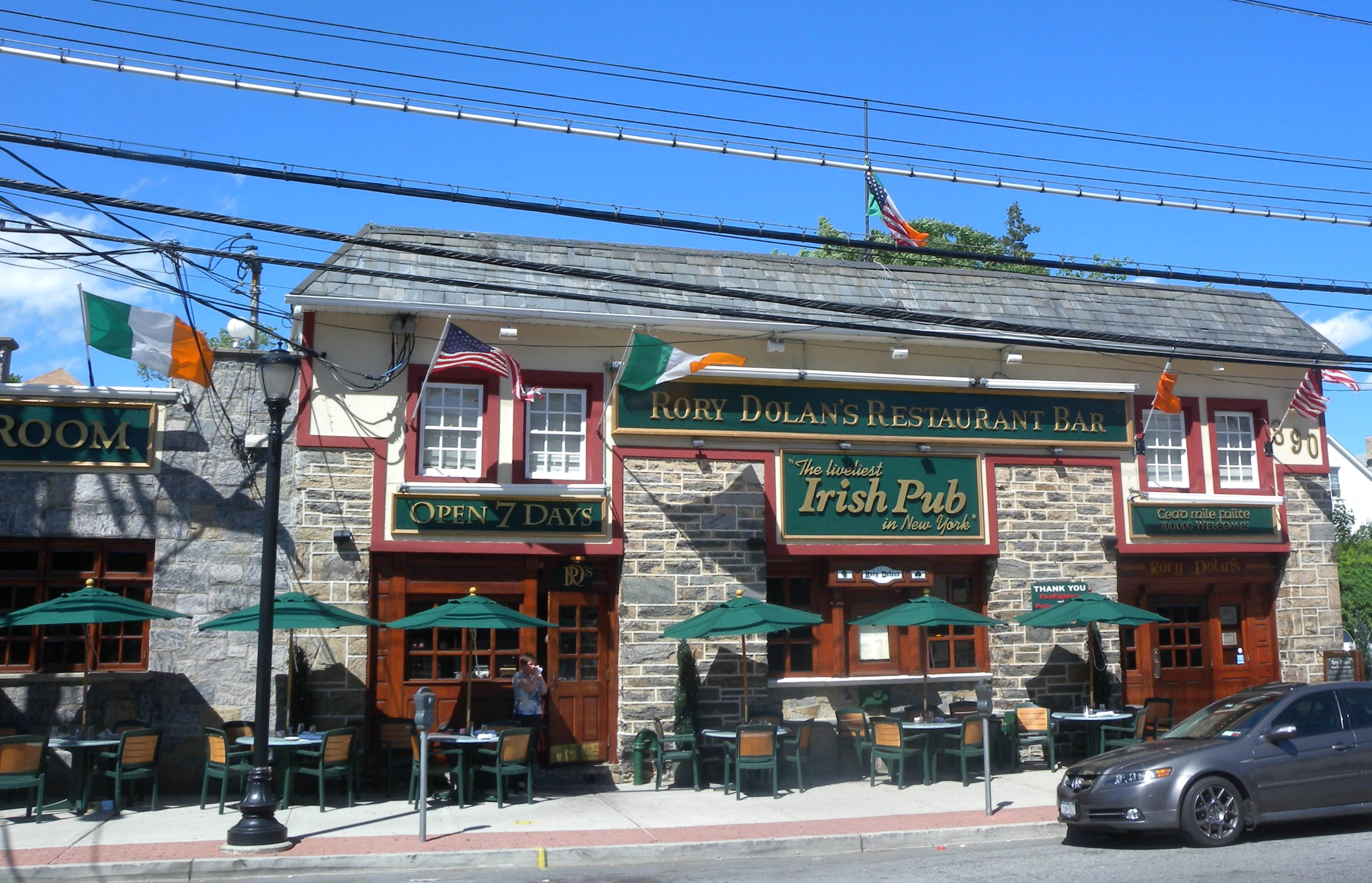
Rory Dolan's Irish pub in Yonkers

=== Current ===
- Woodlawn, Bronx
- North Riverdale, Bronx
- City Island, Bronx
- Pelham Bay, Bronx
- Throggs Neck, Bronx
- Bay Ridge, Brooklyn
- Gerritsen Beach, Brooklyn
- Marine Park, Brooklyn
- Windsor Terrace, Brooklyn
- Vinegar Hill, Brooklyn
- Broad Channel, Queens
- Belle Harbor, Queens
- Breezy Point, Queens
- Rockaway Park, Queens
- Rockaway Beach, Queens
- Sunnyside, Queens
- Maspeth, Queens
- Woodside, Queens
- St. George, Staten Island
- West Brighton, Staten Island
- Randall Manor, Staten Island

=== Historic ===
- Vinegar Hill, Brooklyn
- Five Points/Lower East Side, Manhattan
- Hell's Kitchen, Manhattan
- East Harlem, Manhattan
- Mott Haven, Bronx
- Inwood, Manhattan
- University Heights, Bronx
- Kingsbridge, Bronx
- Bainbridge, Bronx
- Bedford Park, Bronx
- Fordham, Bronx
- Astoria, Queens
- Woodhaven, Queens
- Parkchester, Bronx
- Westchester Square, Bronx

== Notable Irish New Yorkers ==
=== Irish mayors ===
- David Mathews
- James Duane
- William Jay Gaynor
- Thomas F. Gilroy, Irish-born
- William R. Grace, Irish-born
- Hugh J. Grant
- John F. Hylan
- John Purroy Mitchel
- John P. O'Brien
- William O'Dwyer, Irish-born
- Jimmy Walker
- Robert F. Wagner Jr. – his mother was from Cork

=== Irish Bishops of the Archdiocese of New York ===
- R. Luke Concanen, Irish-born
- John Connolly, Irish-born
- Terence Cooke
- Michael Corrigan
- Timothy Dolan
- Edward Egan
- John Farley, Irish-born
- Patrick Hayes
- John Joseph Hughes, Irish-born
- John McCloskey
- John Joseph O'Connor
- Francis Spellman

=== Irish Bishops of the Diocese of Brooklyn ===
- John Loughlin, Irish-born
- Charles Edward McDonnell
- Thomas Edmund Molloy
- Bryan Joseph McEntegart
- Robert J. Brennan

=== Notable Irish New Yorkers ===
- James L. Buckley, U.S. senator, federal judge
- William F. Buckley Jr., writer, editor of National Review
- William F. Buckley Sr., oil baron
- Edward Burns, actor, writer, director
- Joseph Brennan, basketball player
- Jimmy Breslin, former New York Daily News and Newsday writer
- Robert De Niro, actor
- Matthew Broderick, actor
- Jimmy Burke, gangster
- James Cagney, actor
- Hugh Carey, Governor of New York
- George Carlin, comedian
- William Bourke Cockran, congressman and noted Tammany Hall orator
- George M Cohan, entertainer, playwright, composer, lyricist, actor, singer, dancer, and producer
- Mad Dog Coll, gangster
- Margaret Colin. actress
- James B. Comey, Former Director of the Federal Bureau of Investigation
- Jennifer Connelly, actress, model, Academy Award winner
- Kevin Connors, ESPN sportscaster
- James Coonan, gangster
- Gerry Cooney, boxer
- Bob Costas, sports broadcaster, television personality
- Kevin Corrigan, actor
- Charles Dolan, billionaire, owner of Cablevision, Madison Square Garden & Knicks
- James Dolan, billionaire, owner of New York Rangers & Radio City Music Hall
- William A. Donohue, president of the Catholic League
- Art Donovan, football player
- Charles J. Dougherty, president of Duquesne University
- Francis Patrick Duffy, priest, Lieutenant Colonel and chaplain of 69th Infantry Regiment (New York)
- Mike Dunleavy Sr., basketball player, National Basketball Association head coach
- Bill Dwyer, gangster
- Mickey Featherstone, gangster
- Patrick Fitzgerald, United States Attorney
- Bobby Flay, chef, television host, restaurateur
- Mel Gibson, Actor, and Film director
- Charles V. Glasco, New York City Police Sergeant, most well known for his efforts to rescue John William Warde
- Jackie Gleason, comedian
- Pete Hamill, writer, editor in chief of New York Daily News & New York Post
- Henry Hill, gangster
- Charles J. Hynes District Attorney for Kings County
- Mychal F. Judge, OFM, priest and Chaplain of the Fire Department of New York
- George W. Keller, architect
- Raymond W. Kelly, New York Police Department Commissioner
- Caroline Kennedy, author, attorney, daughter of President John F. Kennedy
- John F. Kennedy Jr., son of John F. Kennedy, magazine editor
- George Kennedy, actor
- Owney Madden, gangster
- Michael Malloy, also known as Mike the Durable and Iron Mike, known for being "unkilliable"
- Dennis Hart Mahan, professor of military theory and engineering at West Point
- Alfred Thayer Mahan, influential naval historian
- Wellington Mara, owner of New York Giants, member of Pro Football Hall of Fame
- Jack McCarthy, WPIX broadcaster and kids show host.
- Frank McCourt, author, winner of Pulitzer Prize for literature
- Steven McDonald, NYPD Detective, public speaker, peace maker
- Brian McDonough Radio and Television personality, physician, author
- John McEnroe, tennis player, winner of seven Grand Slam tournaments
- Patrick McEnroe, tennis player
- Roderick McMahon, boxing and sports promoter
- Vincent J. McMahon owner of World Wrestling Entertainment, sports promoter
- Mary Tyler Moore, actress
- Daniel Patrick Moynihan, U.S. Senator
- Joe Mullen, hockey player
- Richard Mulligan, actor
- Chris Mullin, basketball player, member of 1992 Dream Team
- Conan O'Brien, late night talk show host
- John P. O'Brien, mayor of New York City
- Jerry O'Connell, actor
- Carroll O'Connor, actor
- Charles O'Conor, United States Attorney, former presidential candidate
- Rosie O'Donnell, actress, comedian
- John O'Keefe, Nobel Laureate in Physiology or Medicine
- Ryan O'Neal, actor
- Tatum O'Neal, actress
- James Aloysius O'Gorman one-term United States Senator from New York, Justice of the New York District Court, Justice of the New York Supreme Court
- Walter O'Malley, owner of Brooklyn Dodgers, infamous for moving them to Los Angeles
- Bill O'Reilly, news commentator
- Regis Philbin, television personality
- Colin Quinn, comedian
- Richard Riordan, former mayor of Los Angeles
- Al Smith, governor of New York, 1928 Democratic Party presidential candidate
- John Sweeney, president of the AFL–CIO
- Gene Tunney, boxer
- Jimmy Walker, mayor of New York City
- Thomas J. Manton, U.S. Congress

=== Irish gangs ===
- 19th Street Gang
- 40 Thieves
- Dead Rabbits
- Gopher Gang
- Grady Gang
- Kerryonians
- Slobbery Jim
- The Westies
- Whyos

== Entertainment about Irish in New York City ==
=== Music ===
Fairytale of New York by Irish band The Pogues refers to the NYPD choir singing Galway Bay. This is traditional because the force traditionally was largely made up of Irish Americans.

=== Notable films ===
- The Last Dance, 1930
- Me and My Gal, 1932
- Mannequin, 1937
- Angels with Dirty Faces, 1938
- The Flying Irishman, 1939
- Waterfront, 1939
- Little Nellie Kelly, 1940
- East Side Kids, 1940
- The Fighting 69th, 1940
- Going My Way, 1944
- The Kid from Brooklyn, 1946
- My Wild Irish Rose, 1947
- The Lady from Shanghai, 1947
- The Luck of the Irish, 1948
- On the Waterfront, 1954
- Beau James, 1957
- Mad Dog Coll, 1961
- Madigan, 1968
- Quackser Fortune Has a Cousin in the Bronx, 1970
- State of Grace, 1990
- Q & A, 1990
- Goodfellas, 1990
- Mad Dog Coll, 1992
- The Brothers McMullen, 1995
- The Devil's Own, 1997
- Angela's Ashes, 1999
- Gangs of New York, 2002
- In America, 2002
- 25th Hour, 2003
- Daredevil, 2003
- Emerald City, 2006
- Michael Clayton, 2007
- Brooklyn, 2015
- Run All Night, 2015

=== Television ===
- Blue Bloods, 2010
- The Black Donnellys, 2007
- CSI: NY, 2004
- Daredevil, 2015
- Rescue Me, 2004
- Grounded for Life, 2001
- The Job, 2001
- The Beat, 2000
- The King of Queens, 1999
- Trinity, 1998
- Brooklyn South, 1997
- Ryan's Hope, 1975
- Going My Way, 1962
- All in the Family, 1971
- Archie Bunker's Place, 1979
- Late Night with Conan O'Brien, 1993

== See also ==
- Roman Catholic Archdiocese of New York
- Roman Catholic Diocese of Brooklyn
- History of education in New York City
- History of the Catholic Church in the United States
- Charles Francis Murphy, Tammany boss
