= Attica Correctional Facility =

Maximum-security state prison in New York

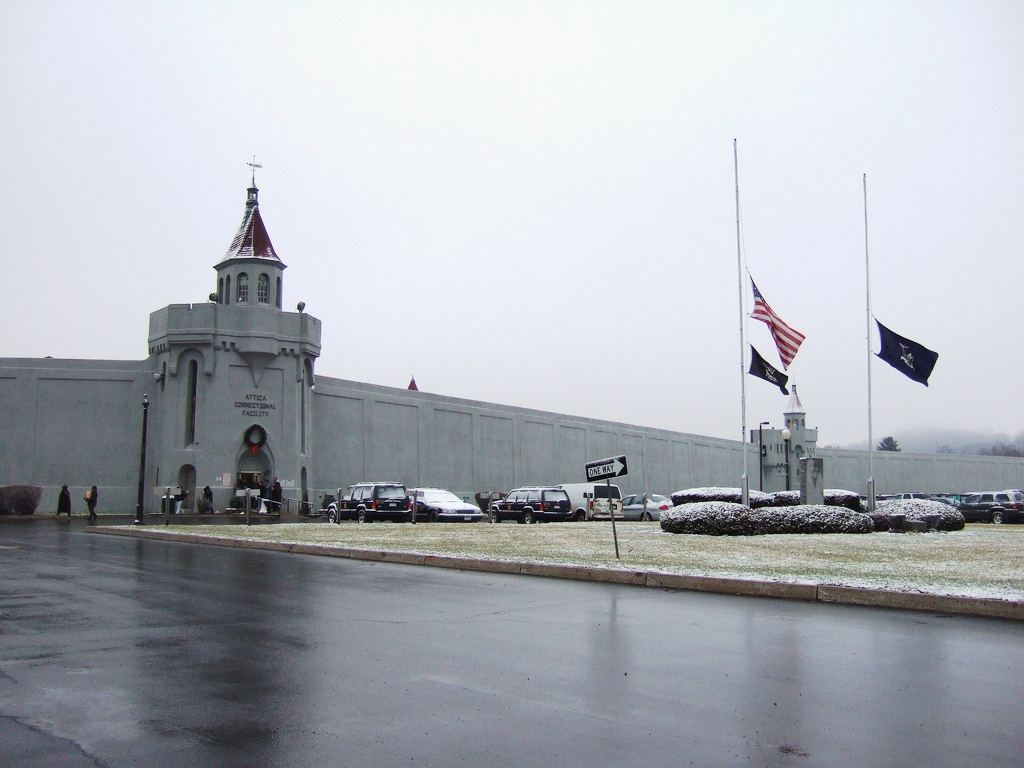
- Interactive map of Attica Correctional Facility
- Location: 639 Exchange Street Attica, New York; 42°51.0′N 78°16.3′W
- Status: Operational
- Security class: Maximum
- Capacity: 2,253
- Opened: 1931
- Managed by: New York State Department of Corrections and Community Supervision
- Warden: Julie Wolcott (2022)

Attica Correctional Facility is a maximum security prison campus in the town of Attica, New York, operated by the New York State Department of Corrections and Community Supervision. It was constructed in the 1930s in response to earlier riots within the New York state prisons. It was the site of the Attica Prison riot in 1971.

A CS gas system (chlorobenzylidine malononitrile) installed in the mess hall and industry areas has been used to quell conflicts in these areas. The prison now holds numerous inmates who are serving various types of sentences (short-term to life). They are often sent to this facility because of disciplinary problems in other facilities. The prison is a maximum security facility.

In 1984, immediately adjacent to the Attica prison, the construction of the Wyoming Correctional Facility was completed. The Wyoming prison is a medium security facility.

== Rebellion ==
Attica was the site of a prison uprising in September 1971 in which inmates took control of the prison for several days. They were seeking to negotiate to improve conditions and treatment at the overcrowded prison. The uprising and subsequent retaking of the prison by the state resulted in 43 deaths and over 89 injuries. Police killed 39 people, ten of whom included correctional officers and civilian employees who had been taken hostage. Three prisoners were killed by other inmates and one guard died later from injuries sustained during the initial uprising.

== Notable inmates ==
- David Berkowitz, better known as Son of Sam, serial killer who confessed to killing six people and wounding several others in New York City during the late 1970s. Since becoming a Christian, Berkowitz has said that he should pay for the sins he has committed and will not seek parole. Berkowitz is now housed at Shawangunk Correctional Facility.
- H. Rap Brown, Black Panther Party leader, served a sentence in Attica from 1971 to 1976.
- Brandon Clark, perpetrator of the Murder of Bianca Devins and then posted her dead body online.
- Jimmy Caci, a captain in the Los Angeles crime family, served eight years in Attica during the 1970s for armed robbery.
- Mark David Chapman pleaded guilty to murdering John Lennon in 1980. Chapman was sentenced to 20 years-to-life for killing Lennon and has been denied parole thirteen times amid campaigns against his release. Chapman is now housed at Green Haven Correctional Facility.
- Joseph Christopher, a serial killer who committed murders in the early 1980s in Buffalo, Manhattan, and Rochester. He was held in Attica in 1985. He died March 1, 1993.
- Edward Cummiskey, Westies hitman during the 1970s.
- Valentino Dixon was exonerated and released in 2018, after 27 years of incarceration, after another man confessed to the murder for which Dixon was convicted.
- Dean Faiello, unlicensed physician who was convicted of the manslaughter of banker Maria Cruz in 2003.
- Colin Ferguson, who murdered six people in 1993 on the Long Island Rail Road (LIRR) in a racist attack. Ferguson was sentenced to multiple life sentences; as of 2025, he is housed at Mid-State Correctional Facility.
- Kendall Francois murdered eight women and stored their bodies in his home in Poughkeepsie, New York. Serving a life sentence without parole, he died in September 2014.
- Joe Gallo of the Colombo crime family spent nine years in Attica for attempted extortion.
- Nauman Hussain: Convicted of manslaughter and sentenced to 5 to 15 years for his role in the 2018 Schoharie limousine crash.
- Arohn Kee, serial killer
- Sam Melville, notorious as "mad bomber" in 1960s. He was among 30 prisoners killed by New York State Police and other law enforcement, in addition to 10 hostages, in their suppression of the Attica Prison uprising on September 13, 1971.
- El Sayyid Nosair, 1993 World Trade Center bombing terrorist was housed in Attica for a short period related to the 1990 assassination of Meir Kahane.
- Ralph "Bucky" Phillips, convicted murderer, was captured after one of the largest manhunts in New York state history.
- Joseph 'Mad Dog' Sullivan, a mobster and the only man who has ever escaped the prison.
- Joel Rifkin, serial killer, was held here for more than four years in solitary confinement before being transferred to the Clinton Correctional Facility in Clinton County.
- Willie Sutton, robbed 100 banks from the late 1920s to 1952.
- David Sweat, killed a Broome County deputy sheriff in 2002 and escaped from Clinton Correctional Facility in 2015; was captured and transferred to Attica in 2017.

== In popular culture ==
- In season 2, episode 2 of The Golden Girls, "Ladies of the Evening", Dorothy claims to have served a year at Attica while arguing with a cellmate at the local jail.

== See also ==
- Inmates of Attica Correctional Facility v. Rockefeller
