= The Westies (TV series) =

American television series

- Genre: Crime drama
- Created by: Chris Brancato; Michael Panes
- Starring: J. K. Simmons; Titus Welliver; Jessica Frances Dukes; Tom Brittney; Stanley Morgan; Sarah Bolger; Allen Leech; Hamish Allan-Headley; Hilary McCormack
- Music by: Mark Isham
- Opening theme: "Dropped on My Head" by Dropkick Murphys
- Country of origin: United States
- Original language: English
- No. of series: 1
- No. of episodes: 8

Production
- Executive producers: Chris Brancato; Michael Panes; John Weber; Frank Cirasuca; Alan Taylor; Raymond Quinlan
- Producers: Nick Iannelli; Michael Maccarone
- Production companies: Chris Brancato Inc.; MGM Television; MGM+ Studios

Original release
- Network: MGM+
- Release: July 12, 2026 – present

The Westies is an American crime drama television series set in New York in the 1980s, centering on the world of the Westies criminal gang.

== Premise ==
In 1980s Hell's Kitchen, New York, two men who know each other from childhood take differing paths in life, with one becoming a police officer, and the other becoming a member of local criminal gang, the Westies.

== Cast ==
=== Main ===
- J. K. Simmons as Eamon Sweeney, leader of the Westies. Loosedly based on Irish-American mobster, Mickey Spillane.
- Titus Welliver as Glenn Keenan, an NYPD officer and former Force Recon Marine with three tours in Vietnam, who has a history with the Westies
- Tom Brittney as James “Jimmy” Roarke, a Westie crew member and Bridget’s boyfriend. Based on Irish-American gangster, James Coonan.
- Jessica Frances Dukes as Birdie Polk, an FBI Special Agent leading an investigation of the Gambino family
- Stanley Morgan as Mickey Flanagan, a Vietnam veteran, former POW, and Westie associate. Based on Coonan's right-hand man and underboss, Mickey Featherstone.
- Sarah Bolger as Bridget Walsh/Sarah McKenna, a former IRA soldier pretending to be an American, and Jimmy’s girlfriend
- Allen Leech as Brendan Cahill, an IRA soldier operating in New York
- Hamish Allan-Headly as John Gotti, a Gambino Family Capo
- Hilary McCormack as Erin Malone, an escort and friend of Jimmy and Mickey

=== Recurring ===
- Vincent Walsh as Eddie Breen, a Westie lieutenant and Sweeney’s right hand man
- Dylan Taylor as Connor, a Westie associate
- Aidan Wojtak-Hissong as Danny Keenan, Glenn’s estranged son working for the Westies
- John Bourgeois as Ray Quinlan
- Mark Camacho as Angelo Ruggiero

=== Guest ===
- Jeremy Walmsley as Pat, a Westie associate
- Ron Lea as Paul Castellano, Boss of the Gambino Family
- Michael Rispoli as Vinnie Zaccaro, a soldier in the Gambino Family
- Adam O'Byrne as Deke Kinsella
- Martin Roach as Leon
- Michael Cram as Father Michael
- Harry Hadden-Paton as Gerald Markham

=== Special guest ===
- Richard Schiff as Ruby Stein, a loan shark

== Episodes ==
No.	Title	Directed by	Written by	Original release date
1	"The Troubles"	Alan Taylor	Chris Brancato & Michael Panes	July 12, 2026
2	"The Houdini"	Alan Taylor	Chris Brancato & Michael Panes	July 12, 2026
3	"The Starship"	Chris Grismer	Chris Brancato & Michael Panes	July 19, 2026
4	"Favors and Funerals"	Chris Grismer	Chris Brancato & Michael Panes	July 26, 2026
5	"A Right Rose Tree"	John Fawcett	Chris Brancato & Michael Panes	August 2, 2026
6	"Rad Tad"	John Fawcett	Chris Brancato & Michael Panes	August 9, 2026
7	"A Boy Made of Trouble"	Adam Kane	Chris Brancato & Michael Panes	August 16, 2026
8	"The Irish Goodbye"	Adam Kane	Chris Brancato & Michael Panes	August 23, 2026

== Production ==
The series marks the third collaboration between screenwriter Chris Brancato and MGM+ after Hotel Cocaine and The Godfather of Harlem. It is created and executive produced by Brancato and Michael Panes. Brancato serves as showrunner on the series.

The cast is led by J. K. Simmons, Tom Brittney and Titus Welliver, with Jessica Frances Dukes.

In July 2025, it was announced that Stanley Morgan, Sarah Bolger, Allen Leech, Hamish Allan-Headly, Vincent Walsh, Richard Schiff and Hilary McCormack were cast.

In September 2025, Aidan Wojtak-Hissong, Jeremy Walmsley and Dylan Taylor joined the series in recurring roles.

Filming got underway in Hamilton and Toronto, Ontario in July 2025.

== Theme song ==
The theme song for the series, "Dropped on My Head", was provided by Dropkick Murphys and is featured as a bonus track on their 2025 album For the People.

== Release ==
The series premiered in the United States on MGM+ on July 12, 2026.

== Reception ==
On review aggregator website Rotten Tomatoes, the series holds an approval rating of 78% based on 18 reviews, with an average rating of 6.7/10. The website's critical consensus reads, "What The Westies lacks in originality, it makes up for with a sturdy crime story, compelling characters, and a cast that knows how to handle the genre." Metacritic, which uses a weighted average, assigned a score of 61 out of 100 based on 11 critics, indicating "generally favorable reviews".
