= Thomas Kapatos =

Greek-American gangster (1915–1977)

- Born: January 1, 1915; New Jersey, U.S.
- Died: January 22, 1977 (aged 62); New York City, New York, U.S.
- Cause of death: Gun shot
- Other names: "Tommy the Greek", Thomas Russo
- Occupation: Gangster
- Convictions: Second-degree murder (1938); Theft from an interstate shipment (1966); Conspiracy, transporting a stolen automobile in interstate commerce (1970)
- Penalty: 20 years to life in prison (1938); 7 years and 6 months' imprisonment (1966); 10 years' imprisonment (1970)

Thomas Kapatos (January 1, 1915 – January 22, 1977), nicknamed as "Tommy the Greek", was a Greek-American gangster who was associated with the Irish mob in New York City. A convicted armed robber, Kapatos was an enforcer for Hell's Kitchen crime boss Mickey Spillane during his war against Jimmy Coonan in the 1970s. He was murdered in 1977 as a result of a conflict between Spillane's gang and the Genovese crime family.

== Early life ==
Born in New Jersey on January 1, 1915, to Florence (née Kalais) and Gregory Kapatos, Greek immigrants from Karpathos, his surname derived from the Dodecanese island. Kapatos, who was also known as Thomas Russo, lived in Fort Lee, Union City and West New York in New Jersey and was employed as a shoreman on the West Side of Manhattan, New York. He was described by New York Daily News writer Joseph McNamara as a muscular man standing five feet, nine inches tall with an "explosive temper".

== Criminal career ==
=== Murder conviction and exoneration ===
On October 6, 1937, Kapatos was arrested in possession of two handguns – a .32 caliber revolver and a .38 caliber Smith & Wesson police revolver – shortly after the fatal shooting of Albert DiLlulio on 48th Street in Manhattan. The .38 calibre revolver contained four discharged cartridges, and boxes containing .32 calibre cartridges and .38 calibre cartridges were subsequently found during a search of Kapatos' home. He claimed to have unwittingly picked up the guns after finding them on a stoop as he made his way to the elevated train after finishing work at the 48th Street pier. Discovering DiLlulio's body nearby, he became frightened that he might be framed as the killer and started running away from the scene when he was apprehended by police. Kapatos was convicted of second-degree murder in the death of DiLlulio and sentenced to twenty-years-to-life in prison on November 29, 1938. He was paroled in 1954 but was returned to prison for violating parole.

Years after his murder conviction, Kapatos learned that there had been a witness, Michael Danise, who had seen two individuals fleeing from the scene of DiLlulio's killing immediately after the gunshots were fired, and that Danise had stated that Kapatos was not one of these two individuals. Danise had also said that after the two persons fled the scene, he had then seen Kapatos walk upon the scene of the crime. This statement by Danise was consistent with Kapatos’ version of events. The existence of Danise had never been disclosed to the defense by the prosecution. Kapatos' attorney, Joseph Aronstein, filed a habeas corpus petition on his behalf based on this new information. On July 9, 1962, judge Edmund L. Palmieri granted the writ of habeas corpus on the basis that the Manhattan district attorney's office had prejudiced his case in failing to disclose the existence of the witness, thus depriving him of the due process of law at his trial in 1938. Having served twenty-three years in prison, Kapatos was released in August 1962 after the charges against him were dismissed.

=== Robberies ===
On November 8, 1963, Kapatos and four others took part in what was dubbed by the press as the "Great Bungled Jewel Robbery of 1963", the attempted theft of a $3 million interstate jewelry shipment being transported in a station wagon by six employees of the AAA Jewelry Service. Driving a black sedan and disguised as policemen, he and another man ordered the station wagon to pull over in Hell's Kitchen, Manhattan before holding the employees at gunpoint and ushering them into a following panel truck, where they were shackled and handcuffed. The heist failed, however, as the robbers were unable to drive the station wagon because it had a standard gear shift which they did not know how to operate. Rather than alert authorities, nearby workers who witnessed the attempted robbery then looted the jewels themselves. Approximately 90% of the stolen valuables were ultimately recovered. Kapatos was identified as a suspect by the New York City Police Department (NYPD) shortly after the failed robbery.

In early 1964, Kapatos joined a gang of would-be robbers consisting of John Pierce, Charles Roberts, Frank "Machine Gun" Campbell, and Henry "Speedy" Speditz. The group were known to each other and frequented the Market Diner on West 51st Street in Hell's Kitchen, which was a gathering place for men who worked in the neighborhood. Recruited by Pierce because he owned several garages in New Jersey, as well as pistols, a machine gun and other necessary equipment and paraphernalia, Kapatos orchestrated a plan to heist a First National Bank of Passaic County, New Jersey money truck as it passed through a secluded side street in Paterson. Requiring a fifth man for the job, Kaparos brought his friend, Thomas Callahan, in on the scheme in late March or early April 1964. After two attempts were abandoned, Roberts and Campbell quit the planned robbery due to Kapatos' objectionable temper, and Campbell died from a heart attack on October 4, 1964. The bank truck's route was subsequently altered to include stops at several churches. On the morning of December 21, 1964, three masked men armed with pistols handcuffed four priests and a janitor inside St. Anthony's church on Beech Street in Paterson and then held two guards at gunpoint as they arrived to pick up the church's Sunday collection. The three gunmen then escaped with $1,100 in collections from the church and $511,000 from the money truck in a Chevrolet driven by a fourth robber. The robbery was the largest ever to occur in Paterson and the largest in the New York metropolitan area since the theft of $3 million in cash and securities from a Manhattan bank in 1878. Kapatos' share of the loot exceeded $100,000; he and Callahan used the proceeds of the robbery to begin loansharking.

Callahan and Speditz attracted the attention of the Federal Bureau of Investigation (FBI) in early January 1965 after buying new cars and going on expensive vacations in Miami. Callahan was questioned at the Miami FBI office on January 22, 1965, but refused to speak. Various items reported missing from two stolen cars used in the bank truck robbery were then discovered during a search of Speditz's apartment in the Bronx, and a streak of white paint found on the fender of one of the vehicles was traced to a scraped door in a garage owned by Pierce. In March 1965, an FBI surveillance team observed Kapatos talking with Roberts, who was subsequently questioned but did not reveal any information about the robbery. In November and December 1965, the victims of the jewelry heist were taken by FBI agents to view Kapatos outside a restaurant and as he worked underneath the Williamsburg Bridge on Delancey Street on the Manhattan's Lower East Side; four of the AAA employees positively identified him as one of the robbers disguised as a policeman. A nun at St. Anthony's also recognised Kapatos as a "beggar" who had twice stopped by a convent two doors down from the church in the months before the Paterson robbery; investigators believe he may have been carrying out reconnaissance on the location. Roberts was shot and wounded by an unidentified man on November 8, 1965, and he survived a car bombing in August 1966, although he lost his right leg and his wife Evelyn was also critically wounded. Roberts subsequently decided to cooperate with the FBI, and he and his wife entered the witness protection program. Pierce and Speditz also disappeared afterwards; investigators believe the pair were murdered by gangsters in order to stop them from cooperating.

On October 7, 1966, Kapatos was convicted on two counts of theft from an interstate shipment for his part in the attempted jewelry heist and sentenced to seven-and-a-half years in prison. His four accomplices in the bungled robbery were never identified. While imprisoned at Atlanta, Georgia in December 1968, he was indicted for the 1964 bank truck robbery along with Callahan, Pierce and Speditz, and the deceased Campbell. Callahan was arrested by the FBI in New York City on December 17, 1968, while Pierce and Speditz were never located. None of the $513,509 stolen was ever recovered. Kapatos and Callahan went on trial on conspiracy charges in New York before judge Thomas Murphy in June 1970. Charles Roberts, walking on a prosthetic leg, served as a witness for the prosecution. Both men were convicted of conspiracy and transporting a stolen automobile in interstate commerce, and each sentenced to ten years' imprisonment – consecutive five-year terms on each count. The U.S. Court of Appeals upheld their convictions on March 22, 1972.

== Murder ==
Kapatos became a chief lieutenant and enforcer for Hell's Kitchen crime boss Mickey Spillane. During the 1970s, a conflict arose between Spillane's Irish mob and the Genovese crime family over control of the Jacob K. Javits Convention Center, which was being built in the Chelsea neighborhood of Manhattan just south of Hell's Kitchen. As Spillane's gang had been successful in denying the Mafia from being involved in the Javits Center, the Genovese family retaliated by contracting freelance Irish-American hitman Joseph "Mad Dog" Sullivan to secretly eliminate Spillane's associates. On the afternoon of January 27, 1977, Kapatos was gunned down on West 34th Street in Midtown Manhattan by a hired assassin in the employ of Genovese boss Anthony "Fat Tony" Salerno; he was the third member of Spillane's inner-circle, after Tom Devaney and Eddie "the Butcher" Cummiskey, who had been killed in a six-month killing spree. Spillane himself was ultimately shot dead outside his apartment in Woodside, Queens on May 13, 1977, allowing the Gambino-backed Jimmy Coonan to assume control of the Hell's Kitchen Irish mob.

== Bibliography ==
- English, T.J. (1990). The Westies: Inside New York's Irish Mob. New York City: St. Martin's Press. ISBN 9780312362843.
