= Westies =

Irish-American organized crime gang

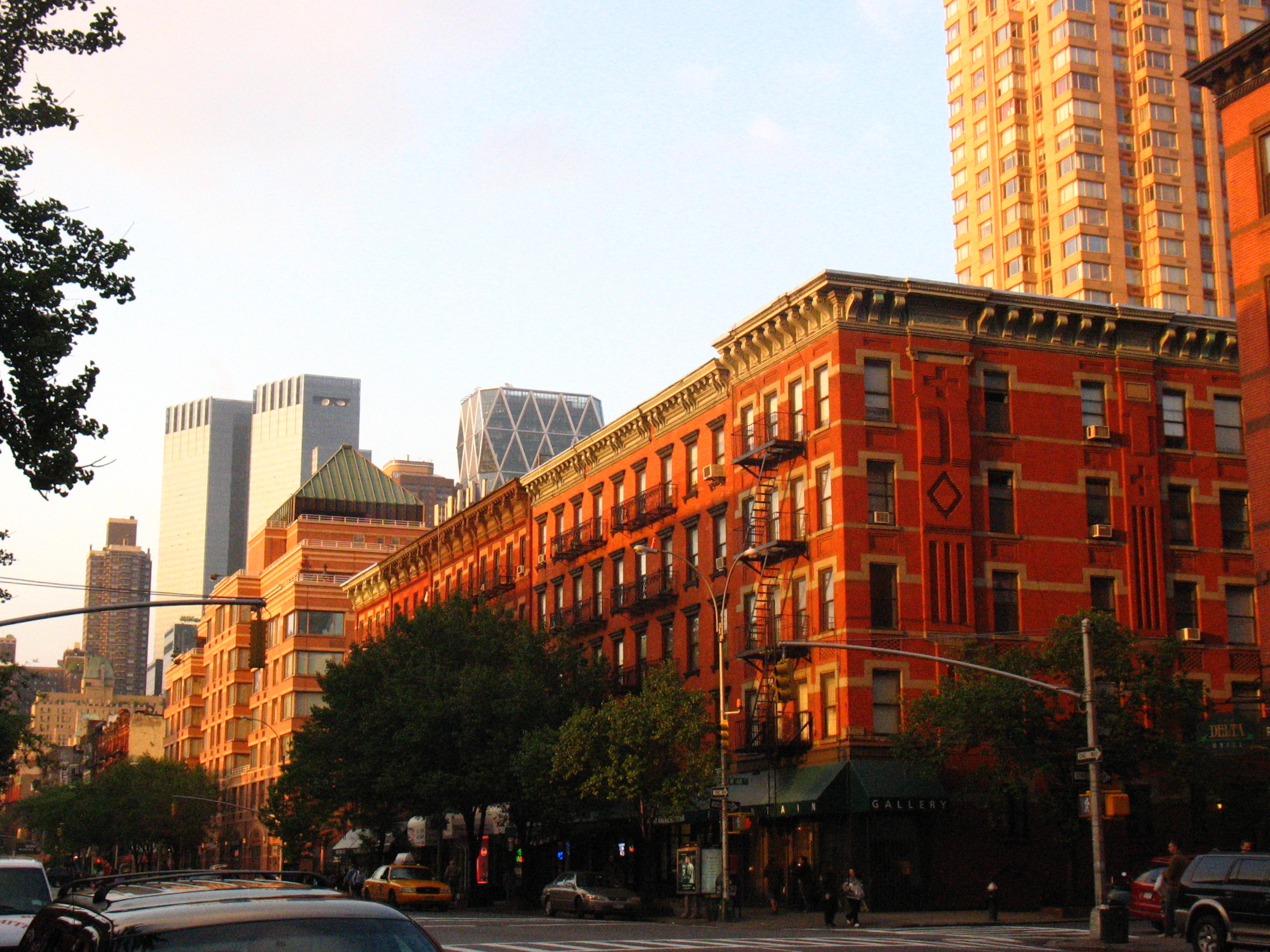
- Hell's Kitchen between 48th and 49th street on Ninth Avenue looking northeast toward Time Warner Center and Hearst Tower
- Founded: Mid-1960s
- Founder: James Coonan
- Founding location: Hell's Kitchen, Manhattan, New York City, New York, United States
- Years active: Mid-1960s–1988/1992
- Territory: Manhattan and New Jersey
- Ethnicity: Irish American
- Membership (est.): 15 members and 100 associates
- Activities: Racketeering, burglary, kidnapping, illegal gambling, fraud, extortion, drug trafficking, counterfeiting, robbery, assault and murder
- Allies: Gambino crime family.
- Rivals: Mickey Spillane's gang

The Westies were a New York City-based Irish-American organized crime gang operating from the early 1960s onwards, responsible for racketeering, drug trafficking, and contract killing. They were partnered with the Italian-American Mafia and operated out of the Hell's Kitchen neighborhood of Manhattan.

According to crime author T.J. English, "Although never more than twelve to twenty members—depending on who was in or out of jail at any given time— the Westies became synonymous with the last generation of Irish in the birthplace of the Irish Mob." According to the NYPD Organized Crime Squad and the FBI, the Westies were responsible for 60–100 murders between 1968 and 1986. They also had little union influence except for the International Association of Machinists, The International Longshoremen's Association (ILA), The Stagehands Union, Aerospace Workers, International Association of Heat and Frost Insulators and Asbestos Workers, and Sheet Metal Workers' International Association that Tom Devaney and Dominick Montiglio had belonged to.

== History ==
=== Spillane years ===
In the early 1960s, Mickey Spillane stepped into a power vacuum that had existed in Hell's Kitchen since gang leaders fled the area in the early 1950s to avoid prosecution. A mobster from Queens, named Hughie Mulligan, had been running Hell's Kitchen; Spillane, a native, was his apprentice until assuming leadership.

Spillane sent flowers to neighbors in the hospital and provided turkeys to needy families during Thanksgiving, in addition to running gambling enterprises such as bookmaking and policy, accompanied inevitably by loansharking. Loansharking led to assault, and Spillane had burglary arrests as well. However, among all his criminal activities, the most audacious was his "snatch" racket (kidnapping and holding local businessmen and members of other crime organizations for ransom).

He was able to add to his neighborhood prominence by marrying Maureen McManus, a daughter of the prestigious McManus family which had run the Midtown Democratic Club since 1905. The union of political power with criminal activity enhanced the gang's ability to control union jobs and labor racketeering, moving away from the declining waterfront and more strongly into construction jobs and service work at the New York Coliseum, Madison Square Garden, and later the Jacob K. Javits Convention Center.

=== Irish–Italian war of the 1970s ===
In the 1970s, the Irish mob saw an increased threat from the Italian Mafia as the Genovese crime family sought control over the soon-to-be-built Jacob K. Javits Convention Center. Since the convention center was in his Hell's Kitchen neighborhood, Spillane refused to allow any involvement by the Italians. Although the Italian gangsters greatly outnumbered the Irish mob, Spillane successfully kept control of both the convention center and Hell's Kitchen. The Italians, frustrated and embarrassed, responded by hiring a rogue Irish-American hitman named Joseph "Mad Dog" Sullivan to assassinate Tom Devaney, Eddie "the Butcher" Cummiskey, and Tom "the Greek" Kapatos, three of Spillane's top lieutenants.

In 1977, Spillane was assassinated by Roy DeMeo in a hit set up by Jimmy Coonan, who wanted to take over from Spillane. Coonan recruited the infamous DeMeo after the pair struck a deal. By eliminating Spillane, DeMeo's crew could then do business with his successor. DeMeo initially came into contact with Coonan after the latter murdered and dismembered loan shark Ruby Stein.

=== Spillane–Coonan wars ===
The war began when an 18-year-old Coonan swore revenge against Spillane, following the Spillane-initiated kidnapping and pistol-whipping of Coonan's father. In 1966, Coonan fired a machine gun at Spillane and his associates from atop a Hell's Kitchen tenement building. Although Coonan wounded no one, Spillane understood that the younger hoodlum was not to be taken lightly. Spillane went to Coonan's father, slapped him around and told him to get his son under control. Coonan was imprisoned for a short period for murder and kidnapping charges that were pleaded down to Class C Manslaughter. He was released in late 1971 and continued his war with the Westside Gang.

=== Trouble with the Genovese family ===
Hell's Kitchen was no longer safe for Spillane and his family, and he moved to the then Irish working-class neighborhood of Woodside, Queens. With Spillane gone, his control of the rackets in Hell's Kitchen began to deteriorate; Coonan became the neighborhood's boss, although some still viewed Spillane as boss. On the New York Commission, Spillane was still viewed as the Irish Mob boss on the Westside, putting the Javits Convention Center construction site under his control. Anthony Salerno, a high-ranking member of the Genovese crime family, wanted the center for himself and reached an agreement with Jimmy Coonan. If Coonan became boss, Salerno would run the construction site and give Coonan a taste of the proceeds.

Salerno then reached out to Buffalo crime family associate and freelance hitman, Joseph Sullivan, to eliminate the three main Spillane supporters in Hell's Kitchen: Tom Devaney, Tom Kapatos, and Edward Cummiskey. Cummiskey had apparently switched sides to the Coonan camp after they both killed and dismembered Patrick "Paddy" Dugan for killing Cummiskey's best friend, but Salerno and Sullivan were not aware of the switch. Devaney and Cummiskey were killed in late 1976, and Kapatos was killed in January 1977. Spillane was out of the picture, and Coonan was the undisputed boss of Hell's Kitchen. It was felt that Spillane still had to die. Roy DeMeo, a Gambino crime family soldier, murdered Spillane as a favor to Coonan. Mickey Featherstone stood trial for the murder and was found not guilty.

=== Coonan and Featherstone ===
During the late 1970s, Coonan tightened the alliance between the Westies and the Gambinos, then run by Paul Castellano. Coonan's main contact was Roy DeMeo. In 1979, both Coonan and Featherstone were acquitted of the murder of a bartender, Harold Whitehead. Another Westie (and top enforcer), James McElroy, was acquitted of the murder of a Teamster in 1980.

Although both Westies leaders were imprisoned in 1980—Coonan on gun possession charges, Featherstone on a federal counterfeiting rap—the gambling, loansharking, and union shakedowns continued on the West Side. After DeMeo himself was murdered, Coonan's Gambino connection became Daniel Marino, a capo from Brooklyn. Coonan eventually interacted directly with John Gotti, who took over the Gambinos after Castellano's murder in December 1985. Gotti appointed Joe Watts as the liaison to the Westies. From time to time, the Westies worked for the Gambinos as a contract killer squad.

Featherstone was convicted of murder in early 1986 and began cooperating with the government in hopes of getting the conviction overturned, and because he believed the rest of the Westies had framed him for the murder. The information he and his wife Sissy provided, and the recordings they helped make, achieved this aim. In September 1986, the prosecutor who oversaw Featherstone's conviction told the presiding judge that post-conviction investigation had revealed that Featherstone was innocent. The judge overturned the verdict. At that point, the information provided by the Featherstones resulted in the arrest of Coonan and several other Westies on state charges of murder and other crimes.

Shortly afterward, federal prosecutor Rudy Giuliani announced a devastating RICO indictment against Coonan and others for criminal activities going back twenty years. Featherstone testified in open court for four weeks in the trial that began in September 1987 and concluded with major convictions in 1988. Coonan was sentenced to sixty years in prison on assorted charges. Other leading gang members were also sentenced to long prison terms, including McElroy, who was sentenced to 60 years, and Richard "Mugsy" Ritter, a career criminal sentenced to 40 years on loan-sharking and drug-related charges.

=== The Yugo era ===
By the early 1990s, the old demographic of the Hell's Kitchen neighborhood was disappearing. The blue-collar Irish-American community was being displaced by a more affluent and ethnically diverse group of residents. With this change came a decrease in street crime and a change in leadership. Boško Radonjić, an American-Serbian nationalist and onetime anticommunist started his Westies affiliation as a low-level associate of Jimmy Coonan in 1983. He became the boss of the Westies when Kelly went on the lam and was instrumental in the "fixing" of John Gotti's 1986 racketeering trial.

Around 1992, Radonjić fled the country to avoid jury tampering charges. He was eventually arrested by U.S. Customs officials during a stopover in Miami, Florida, in 1999. However, Radonjić was released when the main witness in the case, Sammy Gravano, was deemed unreliable. Radonjić returned to his native Serbia where he operated a casino and nightclub until he died in 2011 from poor health. In 1992, a man named Brian Bentley was identified as a member of the Westies and was implicated in a burglary ring responsible for victimizing over 1,000 businesses throughout Manhattan. When Michael G. Cherkasky, chief of the investigations division of the district attorney's office, was asked how much still remained of the Westies, he said: "Too much," and that "it's not the end" of the gang."

=== 21st Century ===
For nearly two decades following the end of the "Yugo Era", there was little mention of the activities or even continued existence of The Westies. But in 2012, the New York Post reported that the Westies resurfaced under the leadership of John Bokun, who was caught, along with accomplices, smuggling marijuana into the US. The New York Times noted that, aside from being the nephew of former Westies, Bokun had no connection to any group using that name. However, "The Westies" is a title created by members of the press in the mid-1980s to refer to the gang; as pointed out by English, at no point did members of "The Westies" ever adopt the label or refer to themselves as such.

== Former members and associates ==
- William "Billy" Beattie
- William "Indian Billy" Bokun — Bokun was convicted of racketeering in the Westies RICO trial on February 24, 1988. He was released on March 6, 2001.
- Thomas "Tommy" Collins
- James "Jimmy C" Coonan
- John "Jackie" Coonan
- Edward "Eddie the Butcher" Cummiskey
- Patrick "Paddy" Dugan
- Francis "Mickey" Featherstone
- Edward "Danny" Grillo
- Thomas "Tommy" Hess
- John Halo
- Kevin Kelly
- Anton "Tony" Lucich — Lucich was a loanshark and bookmaker. He was sentenced to 10 months in prison in July 1980 for perjury after he falsely claimed that Jimmy Coonan was unknown to him while testifying favorably on Coonan's behalf in a 1976 assault trial. Lucich pleaded guilty to racketeering and testified against eight other defendants in the 1987–88 Westies RICO trial before entering the witness protection program.
- James "Jimmy Mac" McElroy
- Boško "the Yugo" Radonjić
- Richard "Muggsy" Ritter
- Richard "Richie" Ryan
- Kenneth "Kenny" Shannon

== In popular culture ==
The 1990 film State of Grace features a fictional Hell's Kitchen Irish gang inspired by the Westies.

The television series The Westies portrays a fictionalized version of the gang. The series featured the characters "Eamon Sweeney" (played by J.K. Simmons) based on Mickey Spillane, "Jimmy Roarke" (Tom Brittney) based on Jimmy Coonan, and "Mickey Flanagan" (Stanley Morgan) based on Mickey Featherstone.

In 2026, Brian J. MacShain released the song "Mickey and Jimmy" on his album Pennamite. It recounts the relationship, and eventual falling out, between Coonan and Featherstone.

== See also ==
- Gopher Gang
- Irish Americans in New York City
