= Eddie McGrath =

Irish-American gangster (1906–1994)

- McGrath in 1953
- Born: Edward J. McGrath; January 31, 1906; New York City, New York, U.S.
- Died: c. 1994 (aged 88); Florida, U.S.
- Other name: "The Big Guy"
- Occupation: Crime boss

Edward J. McGrath (born January 31, 1906 – c. 1994) was an Irish-American crime boss from New York City, who controlled the Hell's Kitchen Irish Mob and the lucrative waterfront throughout the 1940s.

== Criminal career ==
Born to Irish immigrant parents, McGrath grew up in the Gashouse District on the Lower East Side of Manhattan. In contrast to other gangsters of his era, whose childhood typically consisted of street crime and juvenile detention, his upbringing was stable. McGrath served as an altar boy and sang in the choir at St. Stephen's Roman Catholic Church on East 29th Street. He dropped out of school after the 10th grade to work as an office clerk.

McGrath worked as a truck driver for Owney Madden and Bill Dwyer. He was arrested numerous times throughout the 1920s and 1930s for offenses ranging from burglary to murder.

After serving a lengthy stretch in Sing Sing, McGrath ended up as an organizer for the International Longshoremen's Association on the Hell's Kitchen waterfront. With the notorious Joseph P. Ryan in control of the ILA, McGrath became the primary muscle on the waterfront, with gangsters like John "Cockeye" Dunn (who was McGrath's brother in law) and Andrew "Squint" Sheridan as his enforcers. He became a close ally of powerful organized crime figures such as Joe Adonis, Albert Anastasia, and Meyer Lansky.

Eddie McGrath was forced to abscond from New York after Dunn and Sheridan were executed for the murder of a hiring stevedore named Andy Hintz in 1949, and the investigation of waterfront criminal activity subsequently began to escalate.

He left New York in the early 1950s and was living in Miami in 1970, when mobster Hughie Mulligan was reported to be McGrath's "on-premises manager."

McGrath's biography, Dock Boss: Eddie McGrath and the West Side Waterfront, was written by Neil G. Clark and published by Barricade Books in 2017.
