= James McIlroy =

James McIlroy may refer to:

- James McIlroy (runner) (born 1976), British middle-distance runner
- James McIlroy (musician) (born 1977), English heavy metal guitarist
- James McIlroy (surgeon) (1879–1968), British surgeon
- Jimmy McIlroy (1931–2018), Northern Ireland international footballer

== See also ==
- James McElroy (1945–2011), Irish American mobster
