= Federal Correctional Institution, Schuylkill =

Federal prison in Pennsylvania, United States

Coordinates: 40°43′58″N 76°20′38″W

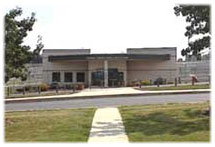
- Interactive map of Federal Correctional Institution, Schuylkill
- Location: Butler Township, Schuylkill County, near Gordon, Pennsylvania
- Status: Operational
- Security class: Medium-security (with minimum-security prison camp)
- Population: 1,330 (340 in prison camp)
- Opened: 1991
- Managed by: Federal Bureau of Prisons
- Warden: Scott Finley

The Federal Correctional Institution, Schuylkill (FCI Schuylkill) is a medium-security United States federal prison for male inmates in Pennsylvania. It is operated by the Federal Bureau of Prisons, a division of the United States Department of Justice. The facility has an adjacent minimum-security satellite prison camp which also houses male offenders. The facility opened in 1991.

FCI Schuylkill is located in north-central Schuylkill County, 46 miles north the state capital of Harrisburg, and 175 miles north of Washington, D.C.

== History ==
On April 22, 1987, the Federal Bureau of Prisons announced that a $40 million medium-security federal prison housing 500 to 600 inmates would be built in Schuylkill County, Pennsylvania. The project was expected to create 250 new prison jobs and an estimated 144 non-prison jobs. Various politicians, including US Senators Arlen Specter and John Heinz, and economic development groups such as the Schuylkill Economic Development Corporation, had lobbied vigorously for the project for three years.

== Notable Inmates ==
=== Current ===
Inmate Name	Register Number	Photo	Status	Details
Gurmeet Singh Dhinsa	53546-053		Serving a life sentence.	Former gas station magnate, who was convicted of racketeering and multiple murders.
James Coonan	13874-054		Serving a 75-year sentence; scheduled for release in 2030.	Leader of the Westies, an organized crime outfit which dominated the Hell's Kitchen area of New York City over a 20-year period; convicted in 1988 of seven murders, as well as kidnapping, extortion, gambling and drug dealing in aid of racketeering.
John Stanfa	18048-037		Serving a life sentence.	Former Boss of the Philadelphia Crime Family; convicted in 1995 of racketeering and conspiracy charges in connection with multiple murders and kidnappings, as well as extortion and illegal gambling.
James Ida	43064-054		Serving a life sentence. Currently at FMC Devens.	Former New York mobster and consigliere for Genovese Crime Family boss Liborio Bellomo; convicted in 1997 of murdering Antonio Dilorenzo and Ralph DeSimone and defrauding charities involved in the Feast of San Gennaro.
Jose Adan Martinez Castro	89600-083		Serving 235 months for conspiracy to conduct enterprise affairs through a pattern of racketeering activity.	Former leader of MS-13 in Boston, Massachusetts.

=== Former ===
Inmate Name	Register Number	Photo	Status	Details
Larry Lawton	52224-004		Held for pre-sentencing. Held in the carrot unit. Faced life but actually 85 years if convicted. After sentencing, he was transferred to USP Lewisburg, a then-high security prison.	Lawton gained notoriety for committing a string of jewelry store robberies along the Atlantic Seaboard prior to his arrest in 1996. He spent eleven years in prison, and once released, began a career as a motivational speaker, life coach, and author.
Dwight Grant	57613-066		Released from custody in 2014; served a 2-year sentence.	American rap artist known as Beanie Sigel; pleaded guilty in federal court to tax evasion in 2011 for failing to pay $728,536 in taxes; pleaded guilty in state court to illegally possessing Percocet in 2013.
Robert Mericle	15135-067		Released from custody in 2015; served a 1-year sentence.	Developer of two for-profit juvenile prisons in Pennsylvania; pleaded guilty in 2009 to failing to report a felony for his role in the "Kids for Cash Scandal", in which he bribed two juvenile court judges in order to secure lucrative public contracts for his facilities.
Chip Skowron	64963-054		Released from custody in 2015; served a 5-year sentence.	American hedge fund portfolio manager convicted of insider trading.
Joseph Nacchio	33973-013		Served a 6 year sentence; released in 2013	CEO of Qwest who was convicted of insider trading.
Mark Abene	32109-054		Served a 1 year sentence; released in 1994	Computer hacking
Bob Menendez	67277-050		Serving an 11-year sentence.	Former United States Senator; convicted in 2024 of various bribery and corruption charges. Was transferred to FCI Allenwood Low as of July 2025.

== See also ==
- List of U.S. federal prisons
- Federal Bureau of Prisons
- Incarceration in the United States
