= Michael Spillane =

Michael Spillane may refer to:

- Mike Quackenbush (born 1976), real name Michael Spillane, American wrestler
- Mickey Spillane (mobster) (1933–1977), Irish-American mobster
- Michael Spillane (footballer) (born 1989), Irish footballer
