= Inmates of Attica Correctional Facility v. Rockefeller =

- Court: United States Court of Appeals for the Second Circuit
- Full case name: Inmates of Attica Correctional Facility et al. v. Rockefeller et al.
- Argued: March 21, 1973
- Decided: April 18, 1973

Court membership
- Judges sitting: Walter Roe Mansfield, John Joseph Smith, and Wilfred Feinberg

Inmates of Attica Correctional Facility v Rockefeller, 477 F.2d 375 (1973) was a United States 2nd Circuit Court of Appeals case that affirmed the right of state prosecutors to choose whether to investigate and prosecute individuals that have potentially committed a crime.

== Background ==
A group of prisoners at Attica Correctional Facility alleged that various crimes were committed against them and their fellow inmates before, during, and after the 1971 prison uprising, and filed a lawsuit in federal district court to compel the state of New York to create an independent investigation of the events surrounded the Attica Prison Riot. They claim, among other things, that those involved in the retaking of Attica intentionally killed some of the inmates without provocation, and that state officers assaulted prisoners after the prison was retaken. They argued that, since the deputy attorney general was appointed by and affiliated with the state officials named in the lawsuit, he could not be impartial, and an independent investigation was necessary.

== Decision ==
The court unanimously ruled against the inmates due to prosecutorial discretion, but left open the possibility that prosecution could be compelled in another situation. The court also noted that the case had more merit than other similar cases, including the recent Supreme Court decision in Linda R. S. v. Richard D. Specifically, the court noted that the inmates had legitimate interest in the investigation and prosecution of those they accuse beyond a desire for punishment. This was because, if the allegations of the inmates proved correct but were not investigated, the crimes described would continue, leading to a direct link between the non-prosecution of the state representatives and risk of physical injury to the inmates.

Despite this, the court ruled that it could not, in general, compel prosecution. It argued that the reasoning and justification for such a decision is not a matter of public record, making it difficult or impossible to understand why the prosecutor had made his decision, and that allowing such a review would require investigators to record and potentially present justification for their decision to end an investigation, even when such a decision was due to circumstances beyond the scope of the case.
