= James McElroy =

American mobster

- Born: James Patrick McElroy; 1945; Hell's Kitchen, Manhattan, New York City, New York, U.S.
- Died: May 2011 (aged 65–66); California, U.S.
- Other name: "Jimmy Mac"
- Status: Died in prison
- Allegiance: The Westies
- Conviction: Racketeering (1986)
- Penalty: 60 years' imprisonment

James "Jimmy Mac" McElroy (1945–2011) was an Irish American mobster and racketeer from Manhattan, New York, who was an enforcer for the Westies, a criminal organization that operated out of Hell's Kitchen.

== Biography ==
Jimmy McElroy was born in 1945 in the Hell's Kitchen area of Manhattan in New York City. He played hockey with many future Westies-aligned criminals at Hell's Kitchen Park and boxed at Boys & Girls Clubs of America with Eddie Cummiskey. He eventually started burglarizing commercial buildings in Lower East Side, Manhattan, and cargo from warehouses in West Side, Manhattan. He rose through the ranks of a group known for counterfeiting, extortion and murder during the 1970s and 1980s.

A former boxer turned drug dealer, McElroy was known for being the driver of the infamous "meat wagon" (a large van used by the mob to transport dismembered body parts). Under the control of Jimmy Coonan, he became the third-highest-ranking member of the Westies during that time.

In 1990 he testified against John Gotti to get a reduction in his racketeering charges, stating that he acted on orders from the Gambino boss when assaulting a Carpenter's Union official three blocks down from the Hudson River piers. Gotti was acquitted on all charges, and McElroy spent the rest of his life in prison.

== Death ==
In May 2011, McElroy died in federal custody. His body was transferred to New York, where a funeral procession was held at the Church of the Holy Cross in the renamed Clinton neighborhood.
