= Edward Cummiskey =

American mobster (1934–1976)

- Born: 1934; Hell's Kitchen, Manhattan, New York, U.S.
- Died: August 20, 1976 (aged 41–42); Chelsea, Manhattan, New York, U.S.
- Spouse: Shirley Forstmann
- Children: 3
- Allegiance: Jimmy Coonan; Mickey Spillane
- Criminal charges: Assault and robbery

Details
- State: New York
- Location: Primarily Hell's Kitchen, Manhattan
- Imprisoned at: Attica Correctional Facility

Edward "Eddie the Butcher" Cummiskey Jr. (1934, Hell's Kitchen, Manhattan – August 20, 1976, Chelsea, Manhattan) was a New York mobster who served as a mentor to Jimmy Coonan, leader of the Westies. Cummiskey is reputed to have shown Coonan how to dismember and dispose of murder victims by scattering their remains into the waters around the sewage treatment plant, which was operated by the New York City Department of Environmental Protection at Randalls and Wards Islands, notably in the Hudson River. Cummiskey was murdered by hitman Joseph Sullivan on August 20, 1976, in a bar.

== Personal life ==
Edward was born in 1934. The New York Daily News August 23, 1976 death notice for Cummiskey reports that "Edward was the son of Edward Cummiskey Sr. and Mary Cummiskey nee Hyndes. He was the brother of Margaret Kagabines, Elaine McCue, Joan Ferrick, Patricia Baeza, Bernard, Robert, Lawrence and Paul. Growing up in Hell's Kitchen, he played hockey with many future Westies-aligned criminals at Hell's Kitchen Park and boxed at Boys & Girls Clubs of America and eventually started burglarizing commercial buildings in Lower East Side, Manhattan and cargo from warehouses in West Side, Manhattan. He was a high school drop out, like many of the Westies." T.J. English described Cummiskey as, "curly black hair, piercing blue eyes, and the cockiness of a bantam rooster, Cummiskey looked and sounded like a gangster from the 1920s".

"At the time of his death, he was married to Shirley Forstmann and father of three- Tammy Ann, Clifford and Terrence." His son Clifford was charged and later found not guilty of being involved in a drunken bar brawl on September 21, 2009, in Hell's Kitchen.

== Criminal career ==
At 39 years old, he had already been convicted of assault and robbery and had been sent to Attica Correctional Facility in Attica, New York and at 37 was witness to the Attica Prison riot September 9, 1971 during his incarceration. He had also spent almost a year on the FBI Ten Most Wanted Fugitives list after being a stowaway on an International Longshoremen's Association freighter to Itaguaí, Rio de Janeiro, Brazil to avoid a murder charge. He allegedly murdered Mike "The Yugo" Yelovich claiming he had to because Yelovich had accidentally shot Cummiskey in the shin bone with a rifle. He was a habituate of the Sunbrite Bar on 10th Avenue and 50th in Chelsea, Manhattan and The Market Diner in Hell's Kitchen, Manhattan.

A longtime gangster of the Manhattan's Westside ghetto known as Hell's Kitchen, Cummiskey served under Mickey Spillane following his release from prison. He was allegedly involved in the kidnapping of Genovese crime family bookmaker Paul (Eli) Ziccardi as well as later participating in the gang war between Spillane and Jimmy Coonan during the mid-1960s. While serving time in an upstate New York prison, Cummiskey learned the trade of butchery and became a butcher with the Amalgamated Meat Cutters, allowing him to take advantage of his sentence to perfect a new murder method.

During the early 1970s, Cummiskey took on a young protégé by the name of James "Jimmy C" Coonan, a violent younger generation Irish hoodlum who wanted to take out the old-timer Mickey Spillane. Coonan had a following amongst the younger Irish in the neighborhood as well as earning the respect of some old timers such as Tommy Collins, who shifted their allegiance to Coonan from Spillane. It was not long before Cummiskey favored working for Coonan over Spillane. Coonan used Patrick (Paddy) Dugan to lure in Cummiskey. Coonan and Cummiskey soon became known associates, as Cummiskey taught Coonan the "tricks of the trade". This new friendship was not to Spillane's liking; however, he did not act on his anger as he did not yet want to risk severing ties with Cummiskey, one of his heaviest hitters.

On November 17, 1975, almost three months after Dennis "Rhinestone Cowboy" Curley's murder, Coonan and Cummiskey called Paddy Dugan in under the pretense of a hit against the Spillane crew, claiming they needed Dugan to be the wheelman in the murder. However, the two soon proceeded with their real plan by murdering and butchering Dugan. Cummiskey, the so-called "Butcher of Hell's Kitchen" taught young Coonan the "art" of body dismemberment. Coonan's niece Alberta Sachs was party to the murder, providing the knives and helping with the cleanup.

The following day, Coonan and Cummiskey went out for a drink with Billie Beattie at the Sunbrite Bar. Allegedly, they brought the head of Dugan with them, set it down on the bar stool, ordered his favorite whiskey, lit one of his cigarettes and put it in his mouth. They are reputed to have said that "Although he fucked up, he was still a good Irishman". Beattie was then instructed to go over to Dugan's apartment and bring down the carton of milk from the refrigerator. Upon his return, Coonan and Cummiskey instructed him to leave the bar and get rid of the contents of the carton. According to lore, the carton contained Dugan's penis, which was later rumored to have been placed in a pickle jar and kept in a refrigerator.

== Death ==
Cummiskey would further himself from the Spillane-led faction of the Hell's Kitchen Irish Mob known as the Spillane Gang and become more and more a member and follower of the young Jimmy Coonan. Then, it was time to begin building the Jacob Javits Center in Hell's Kitchen, which would turn into a tremendous money maker. Because the construction site was in Hell's Kitchen, it was Mickey Spillane's territory, but the Genovese family front boss Anthony "Fat Tony" Salerno did not like that, so, he sent a freelance Irish hit man from Queens by name of Joseph "Mad Dog" Sullivan to get rid of some of Spillane's main men.

Although reportedly on good relations with both Spillane and Coonan (despite rumors of Cummiskey defecting to the Westies), he was shot at point blank range and killed by Joseph "Mad Dog" Sullivan while drinking at the Sunbrite bar on August 20, 1976. His death would be one of many ordered by Salerno seeking to eliminate high ranking and veteran members of Spillane's organization.

His wake was held at the former Buckley Funeral Home at 445 West 43rd Street (now Crestwood Funeral Home and Cremation Services) in Hell's Kitchen, Manhattan and the funeral was held at Holy Cross Church. He was buried in Saint Raymond's Cemetery.
