= T. J. English =

American author and journalist

T. J. English (born October 6, 1957) is an American author and journalist known primarily for his non-fiction books about organized crime — both contemporary and historical — criminal justice, jazz, and the American underworld.

== Biography ==
T. J. English was born in Tacoma, Washington and grew up in an Irish Catholic family of ten children. His father's family owned a steel mill and his mother was a social worker for Catholic Charities. After graduating with a Bachelor of Arts degree from Loyola Marymount University in Los Angeles in 1980, English worked as a high school teacher in East Los Angeles. In 1981, he moved to New York City to pursue a career as a writer, working in a series of odd jobs including bartender, janitor, and most notably, taxi driver for three years, while working as a freelance journalist. Of driving a taxi English has said, "I think of it as a metaphor for what I do as a writer."

== Works ==
His first book, The Westies: Inside The Hell's Kitchen Irish Mob (1990), is a best-selling account of an Irish American gang in the Hell's Kitchen neighborhood of New York City. The Westies operated primarily in the 1970s and 1980s, though the roots of the gang go all the way back to the Prohibition Era.

In 1995, English published Born to Kill, about a Vietnamese gang based in New York City's Chinatown. The book was nominated for an Edgar Award in the category of Best Fact Crime.

Paddy Whacked, published in 2005, is a history of the Irish American mob from the time of the Irish famine to the present day. The book was English's first New York Times bestseller. Paddy Whacked was adapted as a two-hour documentary first broadcast on the History Channel in 2006.

Havana Nocturne (published in the U.K. as The Havana Mob), presents the story of U.S. mobster infiltration of Cuba in the 1950s. Published in 2008, the book rose to No. 7 on the New York Times best seller list and was also nominated for an Edgar Award.

With The Savage City (2011), English turned his attention to racial tension in New York City in the 1960s and early 1970s, when the framing of a young black male for a double murder he did not commit touched off an era of hostility between the NYPD and the emerging Black Liberation Movement. The book was also a New York Times best seller and nominated for an Edgar Award.

Where the Bodies Were Buried: Whitey Bulger and the World that Made Him (2015) was English's fourth book to receive an Edgar nomination and also his fourth New York Times bestseller.

In March 2018, English published The Corporation: An Epic Story of the Cuban American Underworld. This book focused mainly on the organized crime wars of the mid-1980s. Centered around Jose Miguel Battle AKA "El Gordo" and his Bolita (Cuban lottery, "little ball") empire, the book delves into the violence surrounding the Bolita racket between the Cubans and the Italian/Sicilian mob.

In 2023, English received a PEN Oakland/Josephine Miles Literary Award for Dangerous Rhythms: Jazz and the Underworld (William Morrow, 2022) The PEN award is to "promote works of excellence by writers of all cultures and racial background and to educate the public and the media as to the nature of multi-cultural work." Dangerous Rhythms stemmed from English's lifelong fascination with the culture, history and music of Jazz. In 2018, he began his own jazz recording label called Dangerous Rhythms, and from that year until 2020 English hosted a Latin Jazz concert series at Birdland Theater nightclub in Manhattan, which showcased notable jazz musicians such as David Virelles, Bobby Sanabria, Roman Diáz, Sammy Figueroa, Zaccai and Luques Curtis, and many others.

== Journalism ==
In the 1980s, while driving a taxi at night, English wrote for Irish America magazine, which led to his first book, The Westies. Later, he wrote a series of articles for Playboy entitled "The New Mob", which explored the new face of organized crime. He went on to write major feature articles for Esquire, New York Magazine, Los Angeles Times Sunday Magazine, Vanity Fair, Cigar Aficionado, JazzTimes, The Village Voice, the now-defunct Brooklyn Bridge Magazine, and other publications.

In 2010, English wrote "Dope", an article for Playboy, about a DEA agent in Cleveland who was indicted for framing innocent African Americans on bogus narcotics charges. The article was cited by the New York Press Club for Best Crime Reporting. With "Narco Americano", published in Playboy in 2011, English examined the narco war in Mexico after spending time in the Ciudad Juarez-El Paso border area.

English's crime journalism was collected in the book Whitey's Payback: And Other True Stories of Gangsterism, Murder, Corruption, and Revenge (2013), published by Mysterious Press/Open Road Media. In September 2026, English published his second collection of essays, articles and journalism, entitled Blood in the Desert: The T.J. English Reader, via Hamilcar Books.

== The Irish Mob Trilogy ==
With his three published volumes on differing aspects of Irish American involvement in the underworld (Paddy Whacked, The Westies and Where the Bodies Were Buried), English covers more ground than any previous writer or historian on this subject. From the time of the Great Famine of Ireland, through the Prohibition era, the post World War II years, and up to recent times with contemporary crime groups such as the Westies (New York City) and Whitey Bulger's gangster reign in Boston, English explores the full historical sweep of the story.

== The Cuban Crime Trilogy ==
The Last Kilo: Willy Falcon and the Cocaine Empire that Seduced America (2024) completes English's trilogy of non-fiction books covering history from the time of the American Mob's economic exploitation of Havana in the 1940s and 1950s (Havana Nocturne), to the formation of the Corporation in Union City, New Jersey, New York City and Miami in the 1970s and 1980s (The Corporation), to the cocaine era of the 1970s and 1980s that changed America (The Last Kilo). These books show how the Cuban Revolution, which brought Fidel Castro into power in Cuba in 1959, had a major impact on American society — and the criminal underworld — over the following half a century.

== Other writing and honors ==
Also a screenwriter, English has written episodes of the television crime dramas NYPD Blue and Homicide: Life on the Streets. He shared a Humanitas Prize with David Simon and Julie Martin for the Homicide episode "Shades of Gray".

In 2019, Lehman College, City University of New York (CUNY), located in the Bronx, presented T.J. English with the Global Impact Award for "outstanding commitment to global community through advocacy and writing." Two years later, in 2021, the same university gave English an Honorary Doctorate Degree of Letters.

== Media appearances ==
While promoting his books, English has been a frequent guest on television and radio talk shows, podcasts, and featured in documentaries, including, among other broadcasts, Good Morning America, CBS Mornings with Charlie Rose, The Dick Cavett Show, The Joe Rogan Experience, multiple appearances on The Joey Diaz podcast, Fresh Air with Terry Gross, Judy Carmichael's Jazz Inspired, Tony Guida's NY, C-SPAN After Words, and on various episodes of The Daily Show hosted by Jon Stewart and Michael Kosta.

== Bibliography ==
Nonfiction

1. The Westies (1990)

2. Born to Kill (1995)

3. Paddy Whacked (2005)

4. Havana Nocturne (2008)

5. The Savage City (2011)

6. Where the Bodies Were Buried (2015)

7. The Corporation (2018)

8. Dangerous Rhythms (2022)

9. The Last Kilo (2024)

Collections

1. Whitey's Payback (2013)

2. Blood in the Desert (2026)
