= Hughie Mulligan =

American mobster

Hughie Mulligan (died 1973) was a New York mobster and bookmaker who headed criminal activities of the "Irish Mob" in Hell's Kitchen during the 1950s. His protégés included Jimmy Burke, an associate of the Lucchese crime family, and his eventual successor Mickey Spillane.
