= Mickey Featherstone =

American mobster (born 1948)

- Born: September 2, 1948 (age 78); Manhattan, New York City, New York, U.S.
- Other name: Mickey
- Occupation: Mobster
- Status: Paroled
- Allegiance: Westies
- Motive: Organized crime
- Criminal charges: Murder, racketeering
- Penalty: Five years' probation

Details
- Span of crimes: 1971–1986
- Country: USA
- State: New York
- Date apprehended: 1986

Francis Thomas "Mickey" Featherstone (born September 2, 1948) is an American former mobster and the second in command of the Westies, an organized crime syndicate from Hell's Kitchen, Manhattan in New York City, led by James Coonan. Featherstone committed several mob killings before he was convicted in 1986 of a murder he had not committed. Facing almost 25 years in jail, he became an informant and brought down Coonan's gang.

== Early life ==
Featherstone was born on West 43rd St., the youngest of nine children. His mother helped with the Veterans of Foreign Wars and his father was a United States Customs Service officer. He had blond hair and was often said to be baby-faced. At age 17, he lied about his age to enlist in the United States Army, aspiring to join the Green Berets, and was sent to Vietnam, where he served as a stock clerk and never saw combat.

He was involved in criminal mischief with his friends and was disciplined for many drunken pranks. He received a medical discharge in 1967 after just a year, claiming to have hallucinations.

== Return to Hell's Kitchen ==
When a group from New Jersey, called the Riley brothers, entered Hell's Kitchen a fight started with the outsiders. Featherstone returned with a rifle and shot one of the brothers John Riley in the arm, for which he was arrested and probationed. After borrowing Coonan's gun, he shot dead Linwood Willis in a confrontation outside a bar in 1971. He was found not guilty due to insanity.

He spent time in a series of mental hospitals, being released in 1975. He acted up frequently while in the hospitals, leading to him being restrained and injected with thorazine. He began spending time in saloons like Club 596 and Sunbrite that were hangouts for the Westies.

== The Westies ==
Featherstone's penchant for violence and intimidation caught the eye of Coonan and Featherstone became Coonan's right-hand man by 1976. Mickey Spillane, the mob leader in Hell's Kitchen at the time, was shot five times outside his apartment in Woodside Queens in August 1977. Featherstone was arrested but acquitted for his killing. The police suspected him of a series of mob contract killings. He went on trial with Coonan for the killing of a barman, but they were acquitted in December 1979 after one witness killed himself and another refused to testify.

In February 1982, he was convicted after using counterfeit currency at a massage parlor. He was traced because the girl remembered seeing his name tattooed on his forearm. He was sentenced to six years. Featherstone did time in the Medical Center for Federal Prisoners in Springfield Missouri on the psychiatric ward in 1982. He was a model prisoner, seen daily picking fine lint off of his perfectly made bunk to pass inspection, and starting arguments with others for not polishing their door frame brass. The institution kept Featherstone working on the ward, out of General Population, for his own safety.

Featherstone and Coonan had a falling out over Coonan's alliance with the Gambino crime family, which Featherstone saw as a betrayal of all the Irish Americans in Hell's Kitchen.

=== Turning informer ===
Featherstone was convicted in March 1986 for the April 1985 murder of Michael Holly, despite being innocent of this particular murder, which was a revenge attack probably carried out by another of the Westies, Billy Bokun. He was shocked at receiving his sentence of 25 years in prison, and concluded that he had been framed by his own gang. Rather than serving his sentence he instead told prosecutors that Bokun had committed the murder, and he became an informant. His wife Sissy co-operated with the District Attorney's office to tape incriminating conversations with gang members, including Bokun.

In September 1986, Judge Alvin Schlesinger overturned Featherstone's conviction. His testimony at Coonan's racketeering trial during 1987–88 helped to bring down Coonan's gang. He pleaded guilty to a racketeering charge and received a suspended sentence of five years' probation from Judge Robert W. Sweet due to his cooperation with the authorities. He was freed in December 1988 and went into a witness protection program.
