= Tom Devaney =

American mobster

Tom Devaney (died July 20, 1976) was a New York mobster and an enforcer to Mickey Spillane during the 1960s and 70s. As Spillane's chief lieutenant, Devaney played a leading role in the growing animosity between Spillane and the Genovese crime family as well as the gang war against James Coonan.

Devaney was an exhibition worker on the West Side who was murdered by Joe "Mad Dog" Sullivan on the orders of Genovese mobster George Barone because "he was interfering with us", as Barone told prosecutor in court. Sullivan observed Devaney for eight weeks, then disguised himself with an Afro wig and skin dye, followed Devaney into a bar-and-grill in Midtown Manhattan, and shot him in the head.

Devaney's death marked the beginning of the end for Spillane's operation. Spillane was murdered the following year.
