= Mickey Spillane (mobster) =

American mobster (1933–1977)

- An NYPD mugshot of Spillane
- Born: Michael J. Spillane; July 13, 1933; Hell's Kitchen, Manhattan, New York City, New York, U.S.
- Died: May 13, 1977 (aged 43); Woodside, Queens, New York City, New York, U.S.
- Resting place: Calvary Cemetery, Queens, New York
- Occupation: Mobster
- Years active: 1960s and 1970s
- Known for: Controlled Hell's Kitchen in New York
- Spouse: Maureen McManus
- Children: 3
- Parent(s): Michael Anthony Spillane and Margaret Curran

Michael J. Spillane (July 13, 1933 – May 13, 1977) was an Irish-American mobster who controlled Hell's Kitchen in New York in the 1960s and 1970s. Spillane, the so-called “Gentleman Gangster", was a marked contrast to the violent Westies mob members who succeeded him in Hell's Kitchen.

== Life ==
Spillane was born on July 13, 1933, to Irish parents Michael Anthony Spillane and Margaret Curran. He excelled academically and was skipped two grades at the Sacred Heart School in Hell's Kitchen. At the age of 12 he was awarded a full scholarship to attend Rice High School in Manhattan.

Spillane left Rice after two years to help support his widowed mother.

At 17, he attempted to rob a movie theater, but was shot by a police officer. He spent four years in prison.

After his release from prison, Spillane started as a numbers runner for various organized crime figures in Hell's Kitchen. In 1960, Mickey took over the rackets left to him by his predecessor Hughie Mulligan. He married Maureen McManus, the daughter of the powerful Hell's Kitchen Democratic district leader Eugene McManus.

Though Italian mobsters dominated organized crime in the city, the Italian mob stayed out of Hell's Kitchen while Spillane was the boss. Often, Spillane would kidnap members of the Italian Mafia and hold them for ransom to raise money for his operations. Although he ran the rackets such as gambling and loansharking, he never allowed the sale of drugs.

It was Spillane's refusal to allow the Italian mobsters to participate in the rackets in Hell's Kitchen and along the west side of Manhattan that led to his downfall.

The Jacob K. Javits Convention Center was being built on Spillane's westside. The amount of money the new convention center was going to generate was enormous. Coupled with the amount Spillane was already generating from Madison Square Garden, the Hudson River waterfront and the local unions, Spillane would have been powerful enough to challenge the Italians for control of the city. So began the infamous Irish-Italian Mob War of the 1970s.

== Irish-Italian Mob War ==
In the 1970s, under Spillane, the Irish mob became organized and expanded their control out of Hell's Kitchen to most of the west side of Manhattan. The Italian Mafia, seeing this as a threat, demanded involvement in the soon-to-be-built Jacob K. Javits Convention Center. The convention center was being constructed in the Chelsea neighborhood of NYC just south of Hell's Kitchen. Spillane refused to allow any involvement by the Italians. The Italian gangsters greatly outnumbered the members of the Irish mob, but Spillane was successful in keeping control of the convention center.

The Italians, frustrated and embarrassed by their defeat to Spillane and the Irish gangsters, responded by hiring a rogue Irish-American hitman named Joseph "Mad Dog" Sullivan to assassinate Tom Devaney, Eddie "the Butcher" Cummiskey, and Tom "the Greek" Kapatos, three of Spillane's chief lieutenants. By the mid-1970s, Spillane had moved his family out of Hell's Kitchen to Woodside, Queens, because of threats of violence against his children.

In 1966, a young upstart named Jimmy Coonan began slowly muscling in on Spillane's territory. Ultimately, Coonan was sent to prison for ten years in 1967 for homicide. When he was released from prison, Coonan sought to align himself with the Gambino crime family through an up-and-coming mobster from Brooklyn, named Roy DeMeo. This marked the beginning of the end for the Irish mob, as after Spillane's death, Coonan eventually worked for the Gambinos.

== Death ==
On May 13, 1977, Spillane, aged 43, was killed outside his apartment in Queens. It has long been rumored that the DeMeo crew murdered Spillane as a favor to Coonan, with Roy DeMeo being the shooter. Coonan took over as boss of the Hell's Kitchen Irish Mob. Spillane is buried in Calvary Cemetery, Queens, New York.

== Family ==
Spillane had three children.

Mickey Spillane is the namesake of the bar in Hell's Kitchen called "Mickey Spillane's Hells Kitchen" on 49th Street and 9th Avenue, founded by his son, Mickey Spillane Jr.

== In popular culture ==
Mickey Spillane is portrayed by Mark Noonan in a season one episode of the HBO television series The Deuce. Spillane was also the primary inspiration for J. K. Simmons's character, Eamon Sweeney, in MGM+ television series The Westies.

== See also ==
- List of unsolved murders (1900–1979)

== Books ==
- Clark, Neil G. Dock Boss: Eddie McGrath and the West Side Waterfront. Barricade Books, 2017. ISBN 1569808139
- English, T. J. The Westies. St. Martin's Paperbacks, 1991. ISBN 0-312-92429-1
- English, T. J. Paddy Whacked: The Untold Story of the Irish American Gangster. New York: HarperCollins, 2005. ISBN 0-06-059002-5
