= Bill Dwyer (mobster) =

American gangster (1881–1946)

Profile
- Position: Owner

Personal information
- Born: February 23, 1881; Hell's Kitchen, Manhattan, New York, U.S.
- Died: December 10, 1946 (aged 65); Belle Harbor, Queens, New York, U.S.

Career information
- College: None

Career history

owner
- 1925–1936: New York Americans (NHL)
- 1928–1931: Pittsburgh Pirates/Philadelphia Quakers (NHL) N
- 1930–1933: Brooklyn Dodgers (NFL)

William Vincent Dwyer (February 23, 1881 – December 10, 1946), known as "Big Bill" Dwyer, was an early Irish-American Prohibition gangster and bootlegger in New York during the 1920s. He used his profits to purchase sports properties, including the New York Americans and Pittsburgh Pirates of the National Hockey League (NHL), as well as the Brooklyn Dodgers of the National Football League (NFL).

== Early life and Prohibition ==
Born to Michael and Margaret Dwyer, he was raised in Hell's Kitchen neighborhood of Manhattan, Dwyer became one of the leading bootleggers during the early years of Prohibition. In his heyday he reportedly ran a fleet of 20 rum-runners.

Dwyer was working as a dockyard stevedore (hired by friend George Shevlin) prior to the inauguration of the Volstead Act in 1919. With access to supply trucks, garages, and other valuable resources, Dwyer quickly dominated bootlegging in Manhattan within a year. He was able to hide large numbers of supply trucks in his network of garages which, accessible only by secret doors and compartments, were known only to Dwyer and several others.

Eventually breaking away from Shevlin, Dwyer had organized a smuggling operation which ran from Europe directly to Manhattan. Forming a partnership with Frank Costello, and later Owney Madden, Dwyer soon began bringing on future gangsters such as his lieutenant Vannie Higgins and others. Through James J. Hines, Dwyer was able to gain the political protection of Tammany Hall as well as members of the New York police and Coast Guard, who allowed Dwyer's shipments to be delivered to the coast without interference.

However, in 1925, Dwyer was arrested for attempting to bribe members of the Coast Guard during an undercover operation by the Prohibition Bureau and was sentenced to two years. After thirteen months, Dwyer was released for good behavior and slowly began to withdraw from bootlegging, instead investing his money into legitimate businesses including legalized gambling ventures such as casinos and five racetracks as well as sports teams, owning a football team and two ice hockey teams. By the end of Prohibition in 1932, Dwyer had retired from bootlegging and lived with his wife and five children in Belle Harbor, Queens. He died there in 1946, aged 65, of a heart attack.

== Entry into professional sports ==
In 1925, Tex Rickard convinced Dwyer to obtain a National Hockey League expansion franchise to play in Madison Square Garden, and he named them the New York Americans, paying $75,000. With a fortune made in Prohibition bootlegging, Dwyer handed out lucrative contracts, including a three-year deal to Billy Burch rumored to be worth $25,000. Shorty Green also received a huge raise, his salary going from $3,000 to $5,000. This was a time when most NHL players were said to make about $1,500 or $2,000.

He took an active role in owning the team, often trying to rig NHL games. For example, he put in a goal judge who would call a goal against an opponent if the puck merely touched the goal line. It happened one night in 1927-28 when Ottawa was at Madison Square Garden. However, the goal judge seemed more interested in taunting Ottawa goalkeeper Alex Connell. Connell finally butt-ended the goal judge in the nose, which caused Dwyer's buddies to seek Connell's death that night. It took a police detail to get Connell out of the Gardens that night and at the train station, someone inquired if a gentleman was Alex Connell. Connell, knowing he was in danger, lied and said he was not.

The Americans flourished, and Dwyer secretly purchased the Pittsburgh Pirates of the NHL, using ex-boxer Benny Leonard as the front man who appeared to be the team's owner. The team folded in 1930 as the Philadelphia Quakers. In 1930, Dwyer also purchased the NFL's Dayton Triangles for $2,500, relocated them to Ebbets Field and renamed them the Brooklyn Dodgers. He bought the team with Jack Depler, a former player for the NFL's Orange Tornadoes.

By the end of the 1932 season, Dwyer had enough of professional football. The Dodgers, had cost him an estimated $30,000 in just three years. The team was then purchased by two former New York Giants players, Chris Cagle and John Simms Kelly for $25,000.

In 1935-36, the United States government won a big lawsuit against Dwyer, stripping him of almost all of his fortune. What remaining money he had left was tied up in the Americans, and he was losing money here, also. Just before the 1936-37 season, the NHL took control of the Americans, claiming that the financial status of the team was critical. Dwyer filed a lawsuit against the NHL challenging this action, then setting with the NHL, which let him retain the Americans in 1936-37 to give him time to pay his debts. Red Dutton, who was manager and coach of the team, lent Bill $20,000 for the team and Dwyer promptly lost it all in a craps game. When, at the end of the season, he could not pay the debts he owed, the NHL pushed Dwyer out altogether and took full control of the team. The Amerks would remain wards of the league, with Dutton as operating head, until they suspended operations in 1942, never to return.

== Thoroughbred racetrack ownership ==
In 1925, Dwyer built the Coney Island Race Track in Cincinnati, Ohio. Dwyer cut a deal with Ed Strong of Cleveland for Peter Horback to purchase the race track which was in receivership on July 20, 1936 for a $5,000.00 down payment. On September 1, 1936, the deal was finalized and paid in full, in the amount of $95,000.00. The same day the track was sold by Peter Horback to River Downs Inc. of Cleveland, Ohio.

In 1931, Bill Dwyer built the Tropical Park Race Track in Coral Gables, Florida.

== Personal life ==
By the end of Prohibition in 1932, Dwyer had retired from bootlegging and lived with his wife, Agnes, and five children in Belle Harbor, Queens. He died there on December 10, 1946, aged 65, of a heart attack. He was buried in St. Johns Cemetery in Queens.

During his time in Miami, journalist Barbara Walters lived at his home for a brief period. Walters wrote in her autobiography that Dwyer shared a bedroom with his chauffeur and stated that "it seems somewhat logical" that Dwyer was gay. However, Dwyer's granddaughter Anne O'Dowd writes "His bodyguard Shenker slept in the same room as Big Bill for protection from the criminal elements that Dwyer still feared in 1940."
