= James Coonan =

American gangster (born 1946)

- Born: James Michael Coonan; December 21, 1946 (age 79); New York City U.S.
- Other name: "Jimmy C"
- Occupation: Crime boss
- Known for: Leader of the Westies
- Successor: Boško Radonjić
- Spouse: Edna Coonan
- Status: Incarcerated at FCI Schuylkill
- Allegiance: Westies
- Conviction: Racketeering
- Penalty: 75 years' imprisonment and a $1 million fine

James Michael Coonan (born December 21, 1946) is an Irish-American mobster and racketeer from Manhattan, New York who served as the boss of the Westies gang, an Irish mob group based in Hell's Kitchen, from approximately 1977 to 1988. Coonan was incarcerated and began serving a 75-year prison term in 1988.

== Biography ==
James Coonan was born on December 21, 1946, into a middle class Irish-American family in the Hell's Kitchen area of Manhattan. He was the second of four children of John Coonan, an accountant who ran a tax office on West 50th Street, and his wife Anna, who was of partial German descent and who worked at John Coonan's office. He was raised in a five-room walk-up apartment on West 49th Street. By his teenage years, Coonan stood five feet, seven inches tall and had a stocky build, with broad shoulders and a thick neck.

An amateur boxer and street fighter, he dropped out of school aged seventeen and embarked on a career in organized crime. When Coonan was a young man, his father John was kidnapped, pistol-whipped and severely beaten by Mickey Spillane, a well-known mobster who frequently employed the kidnap-for-ransom racket of local merchants to their families. Author T.J. English has credited this event in several books as Coonan's motivating factor in the takeover of the Westies.

Coonan was the bodyguard/apprentice of loan shark Charles (Ruby) Stein according to The New York Times article that alleged he was "known and feared on the West Side as a murderer and kidnapper". Coonan wanted more, and several West Side neighborhood thugs gathered around him, including Francis "Mickey" Featherstone. By 1976, Coonan and Featherstone were engaged in taking over Spillane's territory, culminating in the 1977 shooting of Spillane, for which Featherstone was arrested and acquitted, and the death of Stein. According to testimony given in 1987 by ex-Westies member turned informant William Beattie, Stein was killed and beheaded in 1977 in a move to erase Coonan's debt and prove the Westies power through viciousness.

In 1979, Coonan was tried and acquitted for the murder of Harold Whitehead, but convicted on weapons charges and sentenced to four years in federal prison. After his release he resumed power, but was arrested for murder in 1986. In 1988, Coonan was convicted of racketeering under the Racketeer Influenced and Corrupt Organizations Act (RICO) and sentenced to 75 years in prison with the judge's recommendation of denying parole.

Yugoslavian mobster Boško "The Yugo" Radonjić succeeded Coonan as leader of the Westies.

He and his wife Edna (b.1942; Julia Edna Crotty) lived in Hazlet and Keansburg, New Jersey, before his incarceration. (Note: "The last few years had been good to Jimmy Coonan. Since his marriage a year ago, in 1974, he'd moved out of the neighborhood to a modest, two-story house just across the river in Keansburg, New Jersey, a quiet, lily-white middle-class suburb. The house in Hazlet, New Jersey is the last small cottage at the end of a dead end street. Edna put out a family memorial, about their family being chained together in hell in the afterlife. Instead of a cross, she hid an inverted pentagram in a flower engraved into the stone.")

Coonan is imprisoned at Federal Correctional Institution, Schuylkill, Pennsylvania. He has a full term date of November 17, 2061 and a mandatory release date of June 1, 2030. Coonan was first eligible for parole in 1998. In a February 2023 parole hearing, Coonan asked to be considered for release, citing his mentorship to other inmates, advancing years, time served, exemplary disciplinary record and ill-health. According to court papers, he lost all his teeth in prison, and suffers from partial deafness, obesity, high blood pressure, high cholesterol and a form of skin cancer.

In a motion filed in the U.S. District Court for the Southern District of New York on August 18, 2023, Joseph Corozzo and Thomas Mirigliano, defense attorneys for Coonan, requested that he be released to home confinement under the First Step Act. Corozzo and Mirigliano asked that he be released in order to provide care for his elderly wife, Edna, who was described as "in declining physical and neurological health", at their home in Hazlet, New Jersey.

== Bibliography ==
- English, T.J. (1990). The Westies: Inside New York's Irish Mob. New York City: St. Martin's Press. ISBN 9780312362843.
- Capeci, Jerry; Mustain, Gene (1992). Murder Machine: A True Story of Murder, Madness, and the Mafia. New York City: Onyx. ISBN 9780525934677.
- English, T.J. (2005). Paddy Whacked: The Untold Story of the Irish American Gangster. New York City: William Morrow and Company. ISBN 9780060590024.
