= Frank Milano (mobster) =

American-Calabrian crime boss

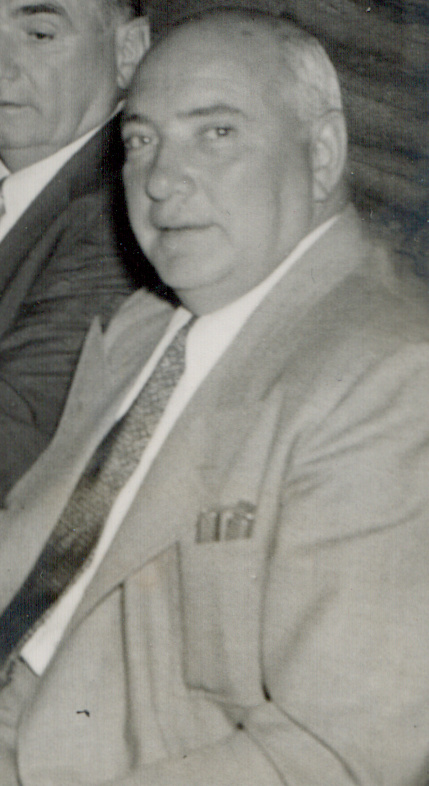
- Milano in 1954
- Born: Ciccio Milano; February 27, 1891; San Roberto, Reggio Calabria, Italy
- Died: September 15, 1970 (aged 79); Los Angeles, California, U.S.
- Citizenship: American
- Occupations: Real estate owner, developer, crime boss
- Predecessor: Joseph Porrello
- Successor: Alfred Polizzi
- Spouse: Marie Milano
- Relatives: Anthony Milano
- Allegiance: Cleveland crime family

Frank Milano (born Ciccio Milano; Italian pronunciation: [ˈtʃittʃo miˈlaːno]; February 27, 1891 – September 15, 1970) was a Calabrian emigrant to the United States who was boss of the Cleveland crime family in Cleveland, Ohio, from 1930 to 1935. He fled to Mexico, and in the early 1960s returned to the United States where he took up residence in Los Angeles, California. He became a criminal associate of the Cohen crime family and the Luciano crime family.

== Early life ==
Ciccio Milano was born on February 27, 1891, in the village of San Roberto in the Province of Reggio Calabria in Italy to Pietro and Grazia (née Mazza) Milano. He had an older brother, Antonio. He emigrated from Italy to the United States in 1907, and was arrested on counterfeiting charges in 1912. He was not convicted.

== Cleveland crime family ==
=== Mayfield Road Mob and rise to power ===
Milano moved to Cleveland in 1913. He became involved in criminal activities immediately after arriving in the city, joining the newly formed Mayfield Road Mob. He and his brother Anthony quickly rose to positions of importance in the gang, and Frank became involved in counterfeiting, murder, and various liquor-law violations.

By the early 1920s, the Cleveland mafia had taken over the Mayfield Road Mob and become the dominant criminal organization in Cleveland. It was led by boss Joseph "Big Joe" Lonardo. While visiting family in Italy, Lonardo lost control of the Cleveland mafia to Salvatore "Black Sam" Todaro and Joseph "Big Joe" Porrello. Lonardo demanded his business back when he returned to the United States, but was murdered by the Porrellos on June 23, 1927. Todaro was killed by the Lonardos on June 11, 1929. Joseph Porrello took over the crime family, but he began to be pushed aside by Frank Milano, who was by now head of a resurgent Mayfield Road Mob.

Porrello began reasserting his power, and demanded that Milano turn over cash owed to him as well as make a large monetary payment as a sign of his loyalty. Milano agreed to do so. On July 5, 1930, Porello and his bodyguard, Sam Tilocco, went to Milano's restaurant, the Venetian, at 12601 Mayfield Road in Cleveland's Little Italy neighborhood. The two sat at a table with Milano and Milano associates John Angersola, Charles Colletti, and Chuck Polizzi. Within minutes, Porrello was dead. Tilocco crawled outside, and died on the sidewalk.

A series of revenge killings left Milano's Mayfield Road Mob in control of the Cleveland crime family.

=== Activities as head of the Cleveland crime family ===
He was a close associate of Cleveland crime family members George Angersola, John Angersola, Alfred Polizzi, and John Scalish, and co-owned Tornello Importing Co., an olive oil importation business, with Alfred Polizzi. Milano was also allegedly close to Mayfield Road Mob member N. Louis "Babe" Triscaro, who later became president of Local 436 of the International Brotherhood of Teamsters.

With the start of Prohibition in 1920, Milano got involved in the distribution and sale of illegal alcoholic beverages. He and fellow mobster Louis Cohen ran a speakeasy at 7310 Lexington Avenue in Cleveland. After police closed it down in 1926, Milano and Cohen opened a restaurant on Hough Avenue.

In 1929, Milano met Moe Dalitz, who ran bootlegging, illegal gambling, and rackets in Detroit, Michigan. The two became close friends.

In April 1931, Salvatore Maranzano, head of the Castellammarese clan in New York City, declared himself capo di tutti capo (boss of all bosses). Lucky Luciano, who opposed Maranzano's claim to control the Luciano crime family, decided to have Maranzano murdered. On April 21, 1931, he met in Cleveland with Frank Milano, Moe Dalitz, Meyer Lansky, Santo Trafficante Sr., and an emissary sent by Al Capone. The five agreed with Luciano's plan to kill Maranzano and establish a new federation of crime families to handle disputes. After the September 10, 1931, assassination of Maranzano, the title of capo di tutti capo was retired and "The Commission" established by the American Mafia. Milano was named a member of The Commission, alongside Joseph Bonanno, Al Capone, Tommy Gagliano, Lucky Luciano, Vincent Mangano, and Joe Profaci.

Frank Milano and Moe Dalitz became partners in the Molaska Corporation, which manufactured dehydrated molasses for use in alcohol distillation. Other criminal investors in the Molaska Corporation included Lansky, Luciano, and Frank Costello (Luciano's lieutenant). Dehydrated molasses was sold to alcohol manufacturers nationwide, allowing Milano to accumulate a large fortune during Prohibition. As Prohibition came to a close, Dalitz advised Milano to expand into new criminal activities. Beginning in 1930, Dalitz and Milano joined with Cleveland mobster Thomas J. McGinty to open casinos (of which the Thomas Club and Harvard Club were two) and lease illegal slot machines to local businesses.

According to Angelo Lonardo, he sought permission from Milano to kill Giuseppe "Dr. Joe" Romano whom Lonardo believed to be involved in the murder of his father, Joseph "Big Joe" Lonardo. Milano approved the assassination, which occurred on June 10, 1936. Lonardo claims that Milano later denied authorizing the killing.

While a member of the Cleveland crime family, he lived in Akron, Ohio, and made extensive real estate purchases there.

== Flight to Mexico ==
On January 30, 1935, Milano fled to Mexico to avoid prosecution for income tax evasion. He took up residence in Vera Cruz. As he could not run the Cleveland crime family from across the border, he stepped down as boss and was succeeded by Alfred Polizzi. The Mexican government granted Milano a permanent visa on April 13, 1942.

While living in Mexico, Milano engaged in a wide range of criminal activities. According to Alvin G. Sutton, Cleveland's top law enforcement officer, Milano smuggled individuals who had been deported from the U.S. back over the American border.

When Wilbur Clark built the Desert Inn casino in Las Vegas, Nevada, in 1947, he sought and received capital from a group of gamblers and mobsters that included Moe Dalitz, Maurice Kleinmann, Thomas J. McGinty, Louis Rothkopf, and Sammy Tucker. A few years later, this group sold a piece of their investment to John Angersola, (Note: Angelo Lonardo refers to him as "John King" in his testimony before a United States Senate subcommittee in 1987. "John King" was an alias of John Angersola.) Frank Milano, and Alfred Polizzi. (Note: Milano was only a "silent partner" in the casino, and had no hand in overseeing it.) In return, the Cleveland crime family agreed to prevent other organized crime figures from interfering with the casino. According to the Chicago Sun-Times in 1966, cash skimmed from the casino (representing Milano's percentage interest in the operation) was delivered to him in Mexico City without going through others (such as Meyer Lansky).

Milano also purchased a good deal of real estate in Mexico. He owned a coffee plantation and extensive timberlands.

== Los Angeles criminal activities ==
Milano relocated to Los Angeles, California, where he associated with Mickey Cohen and Lucky Luciano. According to nightclub owner and former police officer Barney Ruditsky, Milano helped protect Cohen from being murdered by other crime families. According to the Los Angeles Police Department, he owned a wire service that reported the results of horse racing. Using his wealth, Milano financed a wide range of illegal activities, although poor health kept him from any active participation in organized crime. He continued to purchase real estate in and around Los Angeles, as well as in Miami, Florida (where Alfred Polizzi had retired in 1948). He was considered one of the "top echelon" figures in organized crime nationwide.

=== Death ===
Milano died in Los Angeles on September 15, 1970, of natural causes. He was buried at San Fernando Mission Cemetery in Los Angeles, California.

== Relatives ==
Frank Milano's wife, Marie, was at one time a close friend of Mickey Cohen's.

Frank Milano's brother, Antonio (also known as Anthony Milano, Anthony Milana, and Tony Milano), was born in 1888. From 1930 to 1976, he was underboss of the Cleveland crime family. Anthony Milano's sons, Frank Angelo Milano (also known as John J. Gallo), John J. Milano, and Peter John Milano, were also suspected members of organized crime families in Los Angeles.

== Bibliography ==
- Burbank, Jeff (2006). Las Vegas Babylon: True Tales of Glitter, Glamour, and Greed. London: Robson Books. ISBN 9781861059666.
- Bureau of Narcotics (2007). Mafia: The Government's Secret File on Organized Crime. New York: HarperCollins. ISBN 9780061363856.
- Capeci, Jerry (2004). The Complete Idiot's Guide to the Mafia. Indianapolis: Alpha Books. ISBN 9781592573059.
- Cockayne, James (2016). Hidden Power: The Strategic Logic of Organized Crime. New York: Oxford University Press. ISBN 9780190627331.
- Committee on the Judiciary (1967). Controlling Crime Through More Effective Law Enforcement. United States Senate. 90th Cong., 1st sess. Washington, D.C.: U.S. Government Printing Office. hdl:2027/mdp.35112104261161.
- Griffin, Joe; DeNevi, Don (2002). Mob Nemesis: How the FBI Crippled Organized Crime. Amherst, N.Y.: Prometheus Books. ISBN 9781573929196.
- Messick, Hank (1967). The Silent Syndicate. New York: Macmillan.
- Messick, Hank (1972). John Edgar Hoover: An Inquiry Into the Life and Times of John Edgar Hoover, and His Relationship to the Continuing Partnership of Crime, Business, and Politics. New York: McKay.
- Newton, Michael (2007). Mr. Mob: The Life and Crimes of Moe Dalitz. Jefferson, N.C.: McFarland & Co. ISBN 9780786435166.
- Permanent Subcommittee on Investigations (1961). Gambling and Organized Crime. Part 1. Committee on Government Operations. United States Senate. 87th Cong., 1st sess. Washington, D.C.: U.S. Government Printing Office. hdl:2027/uc1.b5138122.
- Permanent Subcommittee on Investigations (1988). Organized Crime 25 Years After Valachi: Hearings Before the Permanent Subcommittee on Investigations of the Committee on Governmental Affairs, United States Senate. S. Hrg. 100-906. 100th Cong., 2d sess. S. HRG.; 100-906. Washington, D.C.: U.S. Government Printing Office. hdl:2027/mdp.39015028778994.
- Roth, Mitchel P. (2017). Global Organized Crime: A 21st Century Approach. New York: Routledge. ISBN 9781138639478.
- Schwarz, Ted (2010). Shocking Stories of the Cleveland Mob. Charleston, S.C.: History Press. ISBN 9781596299184.
- Select Committee on Improper Activities in the Labor or Management Field (1959). Second Interim Report of the Select Committee on Improper Activities in the Labor or Management Field. Sen. Rept. No. 621. United States Senate. 86th Cong., 1st sess. United States. 86th Cong., 1st sess. Senate. Reportno. 621, pt. 1-2. Washington, D.C.: U.S. Government Printing Office. hdl:2027/coo.31924002355729.
- Special Committee to Investigate Organized Crime in Interstate Commerce (1950). Investigation of Organized Crime in Interstate Commerce. Part 6. United States Senate. 81st Cong., 1st sess. Washington, D.C.: U.S. Government Printing Office. hdl:2027/uc1.$b643196.
- Special Committee to Investigate Organized Crime in Interstate Commerce (1951). Investigation of Organized Crime in Interstate Commerce. Part 7. United States Senate. 81st Cong., 1st sess. Washington, D.C.: U.S. Government Printing Office. hdl:2027/uiug.30112004468697.
- Special Committee to Investigate Organized Crime in Interstate Commerce (1951). Investigation of Organized Crime in Interstate Commerce. Part 10. United States Senate. 81st Cong., 1st sess. Washington, D.C.: U.S. Government Printing Office. hdl:2027/uiug.30112004468705.
