= Cleveland crime family =

Italian-American organized crime group

- Founded: c. 1920; 106 years ago
- Founder: Joseph "Big Joe" Lonardo
- Named after: John Scalish
- Founding location: Cleveland, Ohio, United States
- Years active: c. 1920–present
- Territory: Primarily Greater Cleveland, with additional territory throughout Ohio, Northern Kentucky and Western Pennsylvania, as well as Las Vegas and South Florida
- Ethnicity: Italians as "made men" and other ethnicities as associates
- Membership (est.): 60 made members (1950s)
- Activities: Racketeering, gambling, bookmaking, loansharking, extortion, labor racketeering, construction, garbage collection, drug trafficking, skimming, bribery, bombing, assault, and murder
- Allies: Bufalino crime family; Buffalo crime family; Chicago Outfit; DeCavalcante crime family; Detroit Partnership; Gambino crime family; Genovese crime family; Kansas City crime family; Los Angeles crime family; Milwaukee crime family; New Orleans crime family; Pittsburgh crime family; Hells Angels MC
- Rivals: Celtic Club; and various other gangs in the Cleveland area

The Cleveland crime family, also known as the Scalish crime family or the Cleveland Mafia, is an Italian American Mafia crime family based in Cleveland, Ohio, and throughout the Greater Cleveland area. The organization formed during the 1900s, and early leadership turned over frequently due to a series of power grabs and assassinations. In 1930, Frank Milano became boss and was able to bring some stability to the family. Under the control of its longest-serving boss, John T. Scalish, who led the organization from 1945 until his death in 1976, the Cleveland family exerted influence over the International Brotherhood of Teamsters (IBT), profiting from labor racketeering and the skimming of revenue from Las Vegas casinos. The family's membership peaked at around sixty "made men" during the 1950s.

When Scalish died unexpectedly without naming a successor in 1976, the Cleveland family fell into turmoil. A violent gang war erupted in the late 1970s when Irish mobster Danny Greene attempted to take over the city's criminal rackets. James T. Licavoli, who became boss of the family after Scalish's death, hired hitman Ray Ferritto to kill Greene. After several failed attempts on Greene's life, Ferritto succeeded with a car bomb, ending the mob war. The war drew law-enforcement attention that reduced the family's membership and influence, particularly after mobster Jimmy Fratianno turned government witness and provided the Federal Bureau of Investigation (FBI) with incriminating information on the organization.

After a series of convictions, including those of bosses Licavoli, Angelo Lonardo, and John Tronolone, the Cleveland family nearly ceased to exist during the 1980s and 1990s. Lonardo became the highest-ranking member of the Mafia to turn government witness when he began cooperating with authorities in 1983. During the early 2000s, law-enforcement agencies believed the organization was a smaller group attempting to rebuild itself. In the 2020s, the Cleveland family has been characterized as a small group involved in illegal gambling and loansharking.

== History ==
=== Early organized crime in Cleveland ===
Semi-organized Sicilian American- and Italian American-run "Black Hand" extortion rackets first emerged in Cleveland around the year 1900. The Cleveland Division of Police (CDP) soon established an "Italian squad" (also known as the "Black Hand squad") to deal with the problem. After a series of Black Hand-related murders in the city in 1906, the Italian squad largely suppressed this first expression of organized crime in Cleveland. (Note: "Black hand" murders continued into the 1920s.)

Loosely organized gangs emerged again in the 1910s. One Italian American gang, known as the Mayfield Road Mob, formed in Cleveland's Little Italy neighborhood about 1913. Elsewhere in Little Italy, (Note: Now part of Cleveland's Central and Downtown neighborhoods, Big Italy ran along Woodland Avenue from Ontario Street/Orange Avenue in the west to E. 40th Street in the east. Initially Sicilian (with Italians coming after 1910), the Big Italy community formed about 1900. It was home to most of the city's wholesale and retail produce stores, and most residents worked as laborers and tradesmen. It began to decline significantly during the 1930s, and vanished in the 1940s as whites moved out and African Americans moved in.) notary public Angelo Serra oversaw a gang primarily specializing in auto theft that at one point yielded $500,000 ($14,800,000 in 2025 dollars) a year. At roughly the same time, Dominic Benigno led a gang which monopolized in payroll robberies. (Note: Cleveland crime historian Allan R. May says Benigno was the first head of the Mayfield Road Mob. But Cleveland public prosecutor Frank J. Merrick said that after Benigno was executed in June 1922, there was no successor as head of the gang, which makes the case for a distinction between the Benigno Gang and the Mayfield Road Mob.) Meanwhile, another Italian American gang, the Collinwood Crew, operated around the intersection of St. Clair Avenue, E. 152nd Street and Ivanhoe Road in Collinwood. A less organized criminal organization was the "reservoir gang", a group of criminals engaged in armed robbery, auto theft, burglary and other property crimes which established a base at the Baldwin Water Treatment Plant reservoir.

Following the institution of Prohibition in 1919, and nationally throughout the United States on January 16, 1920. many small, organized gangs emerged to illicitly import liquor from Canada, diverting alcohol from legitimate purposes (such as medicine and industry) and distilling and distributing home-brewed alcohol. Small bootlegging operations were run by formerly legitimate businessmen like Michelino Le Paglia, August L. Rini and Louis Rosen. A number of small bootlegging gangs, run by Jewish residents, began operating in the "Little Hollywood" area of Hough, an area bounded by Lexington and Hough Avenues between E. 73rd and E. 79th Streets. The brothels, speakeasies and gambling halls of Little Hollywood became the favorite hangouts of small gang leaders throughout Cleveland, many of whom established their offices in the city's tiny red-light district. Larger organizations included an Italian American gang centered on Woodland Avenue and E. 55th Street, and an Italian American gang centered on Woodland and E. 105th Street. (Note: These gangs existed prior to Prohibition, but were much smaller, less organized, and focused primarily on small-time crimes like auto theft, burglary, and the occasional raid of goods from unattended boxcars in railroad yards.) The Mayfield Road Mob grew larger as it focused more on bootlegging.

=== Lonardo and Porrello brothers ===
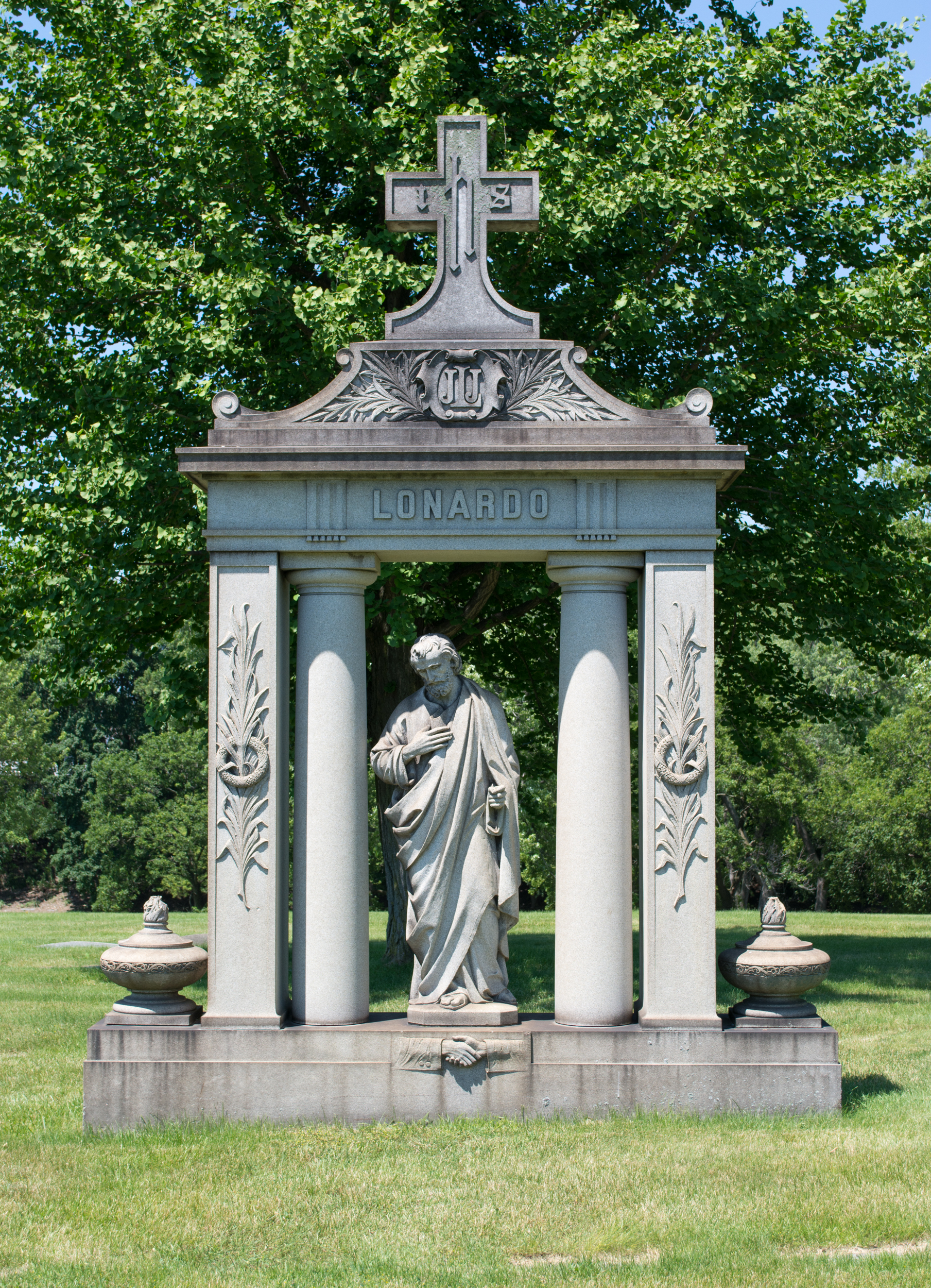
The Lonardo family plot at Calvary Cemetery in Cleveland

The four Lonardo brothers (Joseph, Frank, John and Dominic) and seven Porrello brothers (Rosario, Vincenzo, Angelo, Joseph, John, Ottavio and Raymond) were immigrants to the United States from Licata, Sicily, Italy. Initially establishing themselves as legitimate businessmen, the Lonardos and the Porrellos dabbled in various criminal activities including robbery and extortion but were not considered a major organization prior to Prohibition.

At the start of Prohibition, Joseph "Big Joe" Lonardo, the second eldest of the Lonardo brothers, became the first boss of the Cleveland crime family. His top lieutenant, Joseph Porrello, supervised various criminal operations throughout the early to mid-1920s.

=== Split factions (1926–1927) ===
In 1926, the Porrellos broke away from the Lonardos and formed their own faction, establishing their headquarters on upper Woodland Avenue, around E. 110th Street. In 1927, hostilities between the Lonardos and the Porrellos escalated as the families competed in the manufacture of corn sugar, the prime ingredient in bootleg liquor.

In the summer of 1927, "Big Joe" Lonardo left Cleveland for Sicily amongst rising tension between the two factions. He left his brother John and his adviser, Salvatore "Black Sam" Todaro, as acting heads of the Cleveland family. When Lonardo returned, a sitdown was scheduled between the Lonardos and the Porrellos. On October 13, 1927, Big Joe and John were to meet with Angelo Porrello in a Porrello-owned barbershop. After the brothers were relaxed into playing a card game, they were ambushed and killed by two Porrello gunmen. This allowed Joseph Porrello to take over as boss of the Cleveland family and become the most influential corn sugar baron in Greater Cleveland.

=== Porrellos (1927–1930) ===
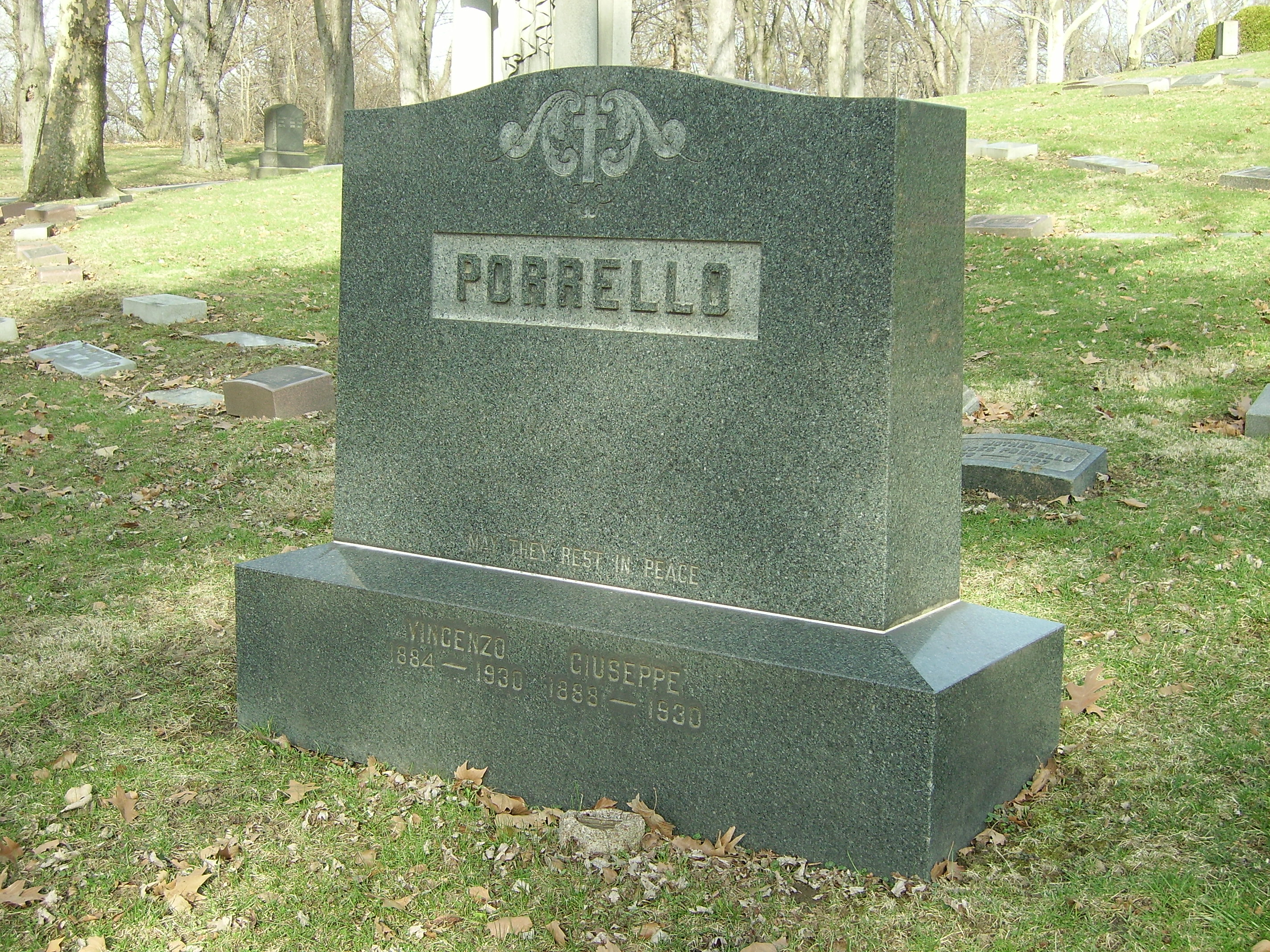
The grave marker for Joseph and Vincenzo Porrello at Calvary Cemetery

Through late 1927 and much of 1928, the remaining Lonardo loyalists, which included members of the Mayfield Road Mob and various Jewish allies within the Cleveland Syndicate, continued to rival the Porrellos for the leadership within the Cleveland underworld. They vied for control of the most lucrative rackets outside of the corn sugar business, which included gambling, the most profitable hustle for crime families of the period after bootlegging.

To establish dominance, the Porrellos needed backing from the top Mafia bosses in New York City, as well as other leading Mafia families across the U.S. On December 5, 1928, one of the earliest-known Mafia summits in American history was held at Cleveland's Statler Hotel. Joseph Porrello, with the help of his top lieutenant Sam Tilocco, hoped to urge the other bosses, which included Joe Profaci and Vincent Mangano of New York, to declare him the official boss of Cleveland. However, the meeting turned into a fiasco as some of the well-known attendees were recognized by local law enforcement and arrested along with their associates. The Porrellos arranged for their associates to be bailed out of jail. In spite of the chaos, Joseph Porrello was declared the boss and recognized nationwide as head of the Cleveland family.

On June 11, 1929, "Black Sam" Todaro was murdered. By the end of Prohibition, most of the Porrello brothers and their supporters had been killed or had sided with the Mayfield Road Mob. Joseph Porrello himself was ambushed and killed along with an underling at the Venetian Restaurant, owned by Porrello rival Frank Milano. Vincenzo "Jim" Porrello succeeded his brother as Cleveland boss, but was shot and killed three weeks later in a grocery store on East 110th Street and Woodland Avenue, in an area considered a Porrello stronghold. Raymond Porrello declared revenge, and on August 15, 1930, an explosion leveled his home. He was not present at the time.

=== Mayfield Road Mob (1930–1944) ===
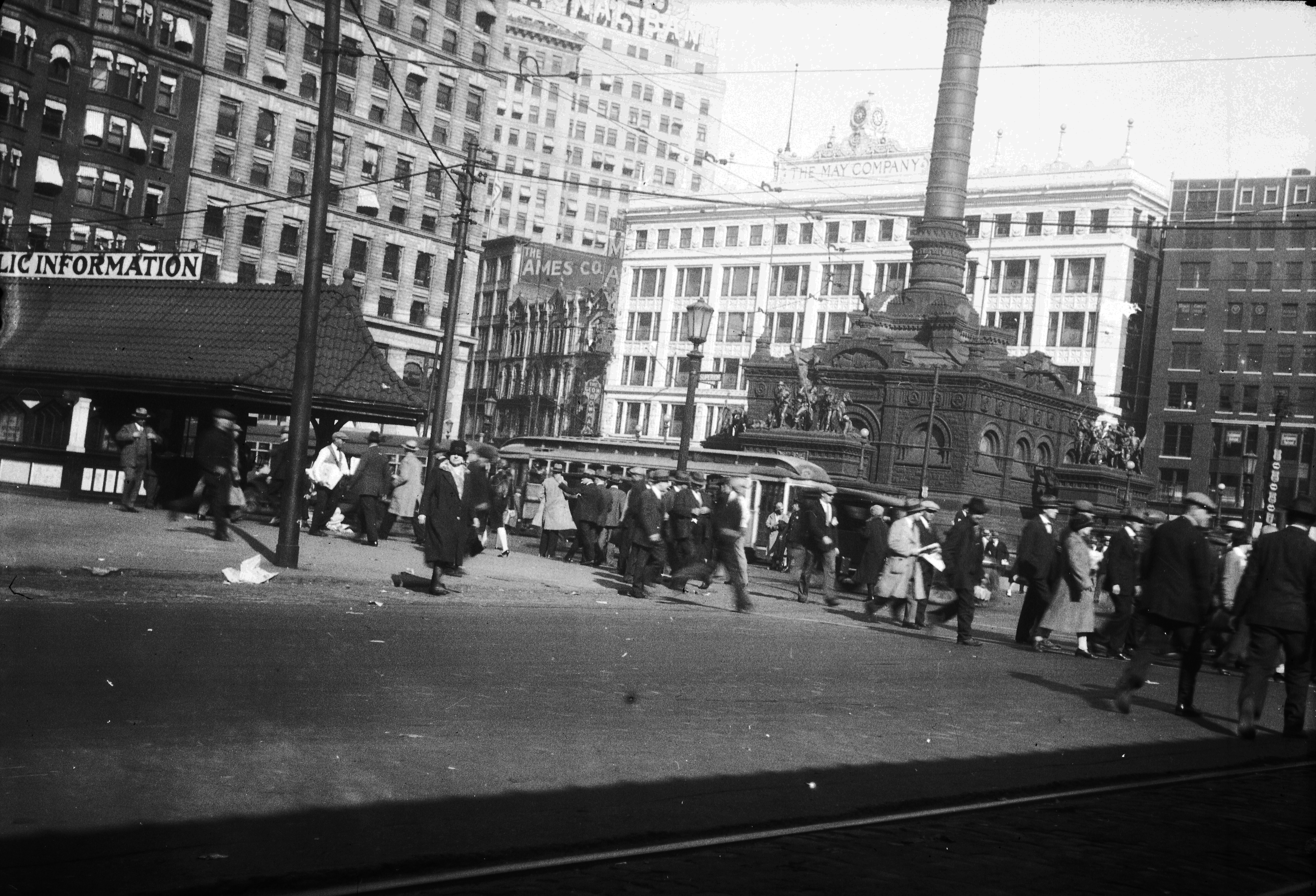
Cleveland's Public Square, 1930

During the early 1930s, Frank Milano and the Mayfield Road Mob gradually replaced the Porrello brothers as the Cleveland area's premier Mafia group, with Milano becoming the official boss of the Cleveland family. In 1931, Milano joined the National Crime Syndicate, a network of powerful criminals which included Charles "Lucky" Luciano and Meyer Lansky. By 1932, Milano had become one of the top Mafia bosses in the country and a charter member of The Commission, the Mafia's governing body.

On February 25, 1932, Milano finished off the Porrello brothers by having Raymond and Rosario Porrello, along with their bodyguard Dominic Gueli, murdered in a smoke shop on East 110th Street and Woodland Avenue while playing cards. The remaining Porrellos subsequently backed out of the Cleveland underworld and fled the area.

In 1935, Milano fled to Mexico after being indicted for tax evasion. Alfred Polizzi, another leading member of the Mayfield Road Mob, seized power and reigned as boss until 1944, when he himself was convicted of tax evasion.

=== Scalish era (1944–1976) ===
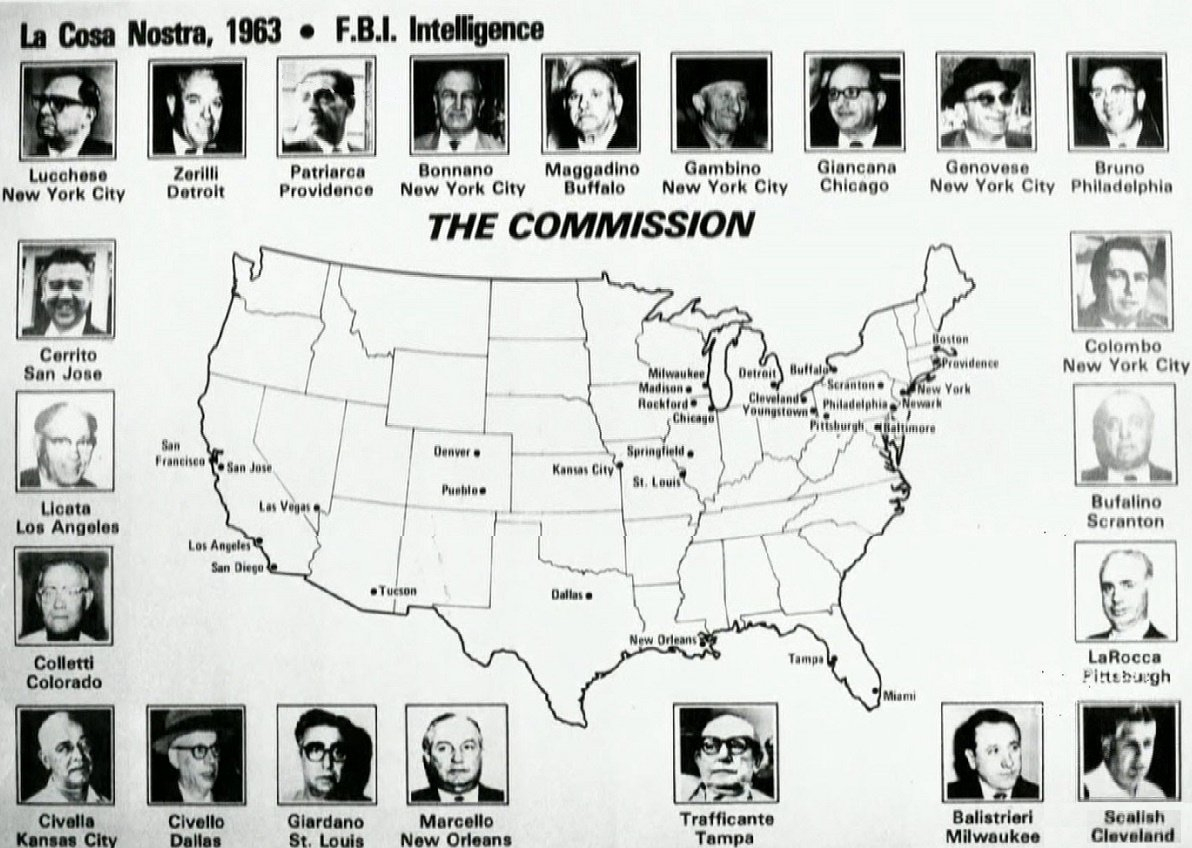
1963 FBI La Cosa Nostra Commission chart

Following Polizzi's ouster in 1944, John Scalish began the longest reign of any Cleveland boss. Under his leadership, the Cleveland family developed ties with important crime figures such as Lansky, Shondor Birns, Moe Dalitz and Tony Accardo, as well as the Chicago Outfit and the Genovese crime family in New York. Additionally, the family expanded its influence to areas throughout the Midwest, California, Florida and Las Vegas. The family helped finance the construction of Las Vegas' Desert Inn casino hotel in the late 1940s and received a percentage of profits from the resort in exchange for providing protection.

In the 1950s, the Cleveland family reached its peak in size, with about sixty "made" members, and several times as many associates. By the 1970s, however, the family's membership began to decrease after Scalish chose not to induct new members. The family's main streams of revenue during this period came from two primary sources; a partnership with other Midwestern crime families which allowed the organization to profit from the "skim" of various Las Vegas casinos, and an arrangement with the Pittsburgh crime family which entitled the Cleveland family to twenty-five percent of the Pittsburgh family's profits from rackets in Youngstown. The Cleveland, Kansas City and Milwaukee crime families also exerted influence over the multibillion-dollar Central States Pension Fund of the International Brotherhood of Teamsters (IBT), and in 1974 the three groups backed a $62.75 million Pension Fund loan to buy two Las Vegas casinos. Additionally, the Cleveland family collected protection money from casinos in Western Pennsylvania and Northern Kentucky.

=== War with Danny Greene (1976–1977) ===
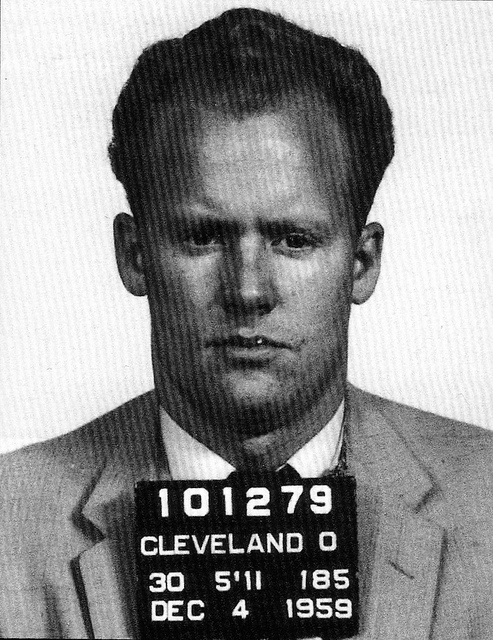
Irish mobster Danny Greene

John Scalish died during open heart surgery in 1976, without officially naming a successor. It was decided afterward by the family's members that James "Jack White" Licavoli would take over as boss. During Licavoli's reign, an Irish gangster named Danny Greene began competing with the Cleveland family for control of the city's rackets. Greene partnered with John Nardi, a rogue Mafia associate and Teamster, who arranged the murder of Calogero "Leo Lips" Moceri, Licavoli's underboss. Moceri disappeared after attending a Feast of the Assumption festival in Little Italy on August 22, 1976; his blood-stained car was found in Akron days later, although his remains were never recovered. Moceri was allegedly killed by Keith Ritson, an enforcer for Greene.

Moceri's murder resulted in a violent mob war between the Cleveland family and Greene's gang, during which almost forty car bombings took place in the city of Cleveland. Due to the number of bombings in the area, the Bureau of Alcohol, Tobacco and Firearms (ATF) opened an office in northeast Ohio and doubled their staff in the region. Among the casualties was Nardi, who was killed on May 17, 1977, by a car bomb in the parking lot of the local Teamster Hall.

Eventually, Licavoli and his crew began attempting to kill Greene. On one occasion, bombs were planted around Greene's home, one in the front and one in the back; the first bomb went off but the second failed, allowing Greene and his young girlfriend to escape. After several similarly failed hits, it became evident that the Cleveland family needed outside help, which came in the form of hitman Ray Ferritto.

On October 6, 1977, while Greene was performing a scheduled visit to his dentist, a car with a radio-frequency bomb placed inside its door was parked next to his. Upon return to his vehicle, the bomb was exploded remotely by Ferritto and Ronald “Ronnie the Crab” Carabbia. The two men were seen by a woman named Debbie Spoth, who was able to help police identify Ferritto. Greene's body lay under the ruins of his vehicle for at least an hour before his corpse was removed. Following the assassination, Ferritto heard that the Cleveland family wanted him dead and turned state's witness, leading to the arrest of Licavoli and other Cleveland mobsters.

=== Decline (1978–1990s) ===
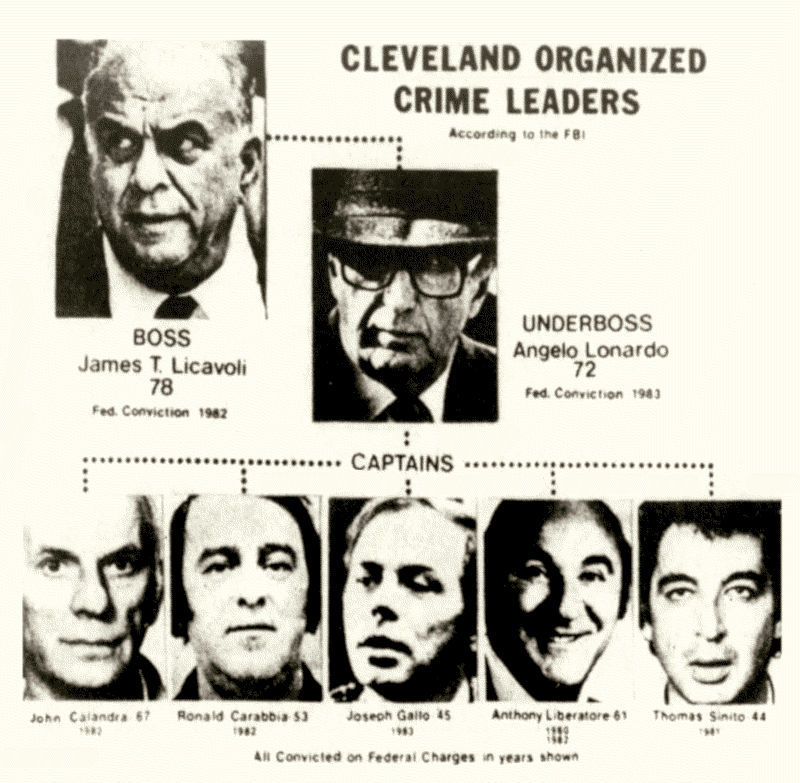
FBI chart of the Cleveland family in 1983

In 1978, the CDP warned then-Mayor Dennis Kucinich that the Cleveland family had put out a hit on him because of some of his initiatives were hindering their criminal activities. Police informed Kucinich that a hitman was planning on shooting the mayor while he marched in the Columbus Day parade; Kucinich missed the parade as he was hospitalized with a ruptured ulcer. However, the mayor took note of the threat and began keeping a gun in his home for protection.

Emboldened by the sudden death of Cleveland consigliere Anthony "Tony Dope" Delsanter from a heart attack in August 1977, Vincent "Two-Gun Jimmy" Prato, the local caporegime from the Pittsburgh family, attempted to establish a monopoly over gambling and extortion rackets in Youngstown, a territory which had historically been shared between the two families. This resulted in a mob war, consisting of twelve murders, which lasted between 1978 and 1981. The Pittsburgh family emerged victorious after the disappearances of Cleveland capo Charles "Charlie the Crab" Carabbia in December 1980 and his crew's top hitman, Joseph DeRose Jr., in April 1981. According to testimony from Pittsburgh mobster-turned-government witness Lenny Strollo, Carabbia was lured to a meeting at a Youngstown donut shop and killed on the orders of Prato and his chief underling, Joseph "Little Joey" Naples, in order to give the Pittsburgh family undisputed control over Youngstown. The killing, as per Strollo's testimony, was carried out with the permission of the Cleveland family leadership.

Eventually, Licavoli was sent to prison for RICO charges related to the murder of Greene in 1982. Angelo Lonardo, the son of Joseph Lonardo, took control of the Cleveland family until 1984, when he was convicted of running a drug ring and was sentenced to life imprisonment. Angelo Lonardo then became an informant, making him the highest-ranking Mafia turncoat up to that time. He informed on powerful mafiosi from numerous families while in prison and caused serious damage to the Mafia's infrastructure.

After Lonardo became an informant, John "Peanuts" Tronolone, a long-time Miami Beach resident and South Florida point man for the Genovese family, was named the new boss of the Cleveland family. In 1989, Tronolone became the only Mafia boss to have the distinction of being arrested in a hand-to-hand undercover transaction by local law enforcement when he accepted jewelry from Dave Green, an undercover Broward County deputy in exchange for bookmaking and loansharking debts. Tronolone died in 1991 before he could start his nine-year state prison sentence.

By 1990, the Cleveland family had been so aggressively dismantled by law enforcement agencies that the family had no "made" members who were not imprisoned, and the organization was reported to be virtually defunct. In addition to convictions, defections and deaths, the loss of the family's influence over the IBT also significantly weakened their stature. After Tronolone's death, Anthony "Tony Lib" Liberatore took over the remnants of the Cleveland family until he was imprisoned for racketeering and money laundering in 1993.

Following the imprisonment of Liberatore, two mafiosi who had been inducted into the family by Angelo Lonardo in 1983 – Joseph "Joe Loose" Iacobacci and Russell "R.J." Papalardo – became the leading figures in the Cleveland Mafia. Iacobacci, along with Alfred "Allie" Calabrese, was convicted of bank fraud and sentenced to three years in federal prison in 1995, during which time Papalardo served as acting boss of the family.

In May 1998, Anthony P. Delmonti, an associate of the Cleveland family and the Rochester, New York faction of the Bonanno crime family, became a confidential informant for the FBI's Cleveland office and provided the Bureau with information on a Mafia-controlled Rochester-to-Cleveland stolen car ring, a Los Angeles-to-Cleveland cocaine ring headed by Cleveland businessman Robert E. Walsh and a $10 million-per-year numbers racket operated by Virgil Ogletree, a former associate of Shondor Birns and Don King. Delmonti covertly recorded over 500 audio and videotapes which led to the seizure of $100,000 in illicit gambling money, $250,000 in stolen vehicles and 700 kilograms of cocaine, and over a hundred convictions in Cleveland and Rochester between 2000 and 2002.

=== Current position ===
Despite the imprisonment of Iacobacci in the late 1990s, he and Papalardo were reportedly able to steadily rebuild the organization in the 21st century. Iocobacci inducted new members into the family, forged ties with the Chicago Outfit, the Detroit Partnership and the DeCavalcante crime family of New Jersey, and reportedly oversaw rackets in Cleveland, Youngstown, Pittsburgh and Rochester. Iocobacci retired in the 2000s after he reportedly relinquished much of his family's territory to the Chicago Outfit. Papalardo succeeded Iacobacci as boss of the Cleveland family upon Iacobacci's retirement. In 2020, crime reporter Scott Burnstein described the organization as: "These days, the Cleveland crime family is a small group of mostly old-timers, bookies and loansharks". According to Burnstein, the Cleveland Mafia is an "almost-benign group ... with a limited formal structure."

== Historical leadership ==
=== Boss (official and acting) ===
- 1920–1927 — Joseph "Big Joe" Lonardo — murdered on October 13, 1927
- 1927–1929 — Salvatore "Black Sam" Todaro — murdered on June 11, 1929
- 1929–1930 — Joseph "Big Joe" Porrello — murdered on July 5, 1930
- 1930–1935 — Frank Milano — fled to Mexico in 1935, moved to California in the late 1950s; died of natural causes in 1970
  - Acting 1935 — Giuseppe "Dr. Joe" Romano
- 1935–1945 — Alfred "Big Al" Polizzi — arrested in 1944, retired to Florida in 1945, died of natural causes in 1975
  - Acting 1944–1945 — John T. "John Scalise" Scalish — became official boss
- 1945–1976 — John T. "John Scalise" Scalish — died of complications during heart surgery in 1976.
- 1976–1985 — James "Jack White" Licavoli — imprisoned in 1981, died of natural causes in 1985.
  - Acting 1981–1983 — Angelo "Big Ange" Lonardo — turned informant in October 1983, died of natural causes in 2006.
  - Acting 1983–1985 — John "Peanuts" Tronolone
- 1985–1991 — John "Peanuts" Tronolone — died of natural causes in 1991
- 1991–1993 — Anthony "Tony Lib" Liberatore — imprisoned in 1993, died of natural causes in 1998.
- 1993–2004 — Joseph "Joe Loose" Iacobacci — retired, died 2020
- 2004–present — Russell "R.J." Papalardo

=== Underboss ===
- 1930–1976 – Anthony Milano – retired in 1976, deceased in 1978.
- 1976 – Calogero "Leo Lips" Moceri – disappeared and murdered in 1976.
- 1976–1983 – Angelo "Big Ange" Lonardo – turned informant in October 1983, deceased in 2006.
- 1983–1985 – John "Peanuts" Tronolone – became boss in 1985.
- 1985–1991 – Anthony "Tony Lib" Liberatore – became boss.
- 1991–1995 – Alfred "Allie" Calabrese – imprisoned in 1995.
- 1995–2004 – Russell "RJ" Papalardo – became boss

=== Consigliere ===
- 1930–1972 – John DeMarco – died in 1972
- 1972–1973 – Frank "Frankie B" Brancato
- 1973–1977 – Anthony "Tony Dope" Delsanter - died of natural causes in August 1977
- 1977–1983 – John "Peanuts" Tronolone – became underboss in 1983.
- 1983–1993 – Louis "Bones" Battista aka "The Bulldog" (deceased)
- 1993–1996 – Teddy "Sonny" Sutula aka "Stach" (deceased)
- 1999–2010 – Raymond "Lefty" LaMarca (deceased 2010)

== Current members ==
=== Administration ===
- Boss — Russell J. "R.J." Papalardo (born on July 4, 1941) — Papalardo was inducted into the crime family in 1983. In 1986, he was convicted for his role in a multimillion-dollar cocaine ring operated by the Cleveland crime family and served four years in federal prison. Papalardo was made acting boss while Joseph "Joe Loose" Iacobacci was imprisoned in the late 1990s and he succeeded Iacobacci as boss of the family in the mid-2000s.

=== Soldiers ===
- Ronald "Ronnie" Lucarelli Jr. – soldier and major cocaine distributor in the Cleveland area. He was among 28 members of a drug ring indicted on federal charges in June 2000. On December 27, 2000, Lucarelli was sentenced to 14 years in prison after pleading guilty to two counts of conspiracy to distribute cocaine. He was released on November 10, 2011.

== Former members ==
- Frank "Frankie B" Brancato — former consigliere. Brancato was born in Brooklyn, New York and moved to Cleveland. He was a member of the Licatese faction during the Corn Sugar War and was allegedly involved in the murders of Rosario and Raymond Porrello in 1932. Brancato was later dispatched to oversee gambling rackets in Akron before gaining influence over Teamsters Local 436 in Cleveland. During the 1960s, he recruited Irish gangsters, including Danny Greene, to enforce the Cleveland Mafia's control over the garbage hauling industry and other rackets. In 1968, Brancato and Joseph Messina were indicted for extorting mobile home dealers in Youngstown. After Messina was murdered later that year, Brancato selected Greene to replace Messina as head of the crime family's garbage hauling rackets. Brancato died of natural causes in 1973, after which Greene retained ownership of their rackets and refused to pay tribute to the Mafia, sparking a mob war.
- Amato "Tuttie" Bucci — former soldier. Born in 1927. Bucci was allegedly involved in drug trafficking and armed robbery. He died in January 2005.
- Alfred "Allie Con" Calabrese — former underboss. Calabrese was a close associate of Pasquale Cisternino and a member of Cisternino's burglary ring. He was convicted three times of breaking and entering and once of armed bank robbery. Calabrese became affiliated with the Cleveland Mafia in the late 1960s. He was an enforcer during the crime family's war against rival gang boss Danny Greene. On September 10, 1976, Calabrese was allegedly involved in an assassination attempt on Greene ally John Nardi when Nardi escaped a shooting outside the Italian-American Brotherhood Club in Cleveland's Little Italy. On September 24, 1976, Calabrese survived a murder attempt by Greene's gang outside his home in the Collinwood neighborhood of Cleveland when a bomb attached to his Lincoln Continental automobile detonated and killed his neighbor, Frank Pircio, when Pircio tried to move Calabrese's vehicle to get his own car out of a shared driveway. The bombing was allegedly carried out by the Cleveland Hells Angels under contract from Greene. Calabrese was a key member and "stakeout man" on the hit team which killed Greene in October 1977. On December 5, 1977, Calabrese and seven other mobsters were arrested for Greene's murder.
- John P. Calandra — former capo. Calandra was indicted on a loansharking charge in 1971 but the evidence was suppressed by a federal judge. He became a senior lieutenant to James Licavoli. On December 5, 1977, Calandra and seven other mobsters were arrested for the October 1977 murder of Danny Greene. He was acquitted of a state murder charge in 1978. Calandra was one of six mobsters indicted in May 1979 on federal racketeering charges relating to the murders of Greene and John Nardi.
- Ronald C. "Ronnie the Crab" Carabbia — former soldier. Carabbia operated the Crown Vending company in Struthers, a suburb of Youngstown. In 1975, while attending Super Bowl IX in New Orleans, Carabbia and three other Youngstown men—Mahoning County Prosecutor Vincent Gilmartin, Youngstown City Council Clerk George Vukovich, and Stanley Goldich, Gilmartin's chief investigator—were arrested in a gambling raid. He took control of the Youngstown faction for the family following the death of Anthony Delsanter in August 1977. Carrabia was an accomplice to Ray Ferritto in the October 6, 1977 car bomb murder of Danny Greene. On December 5, 1977, he was of eight mobsters arrested for Greene's killing. In May 1978, he was convicted of aggravated murder for the killing. Carrabia was paroled from Chillicothe Correctional Institution on September 24, 2002. He died on December 22, 2021, aged 92.
- Eugene J. "The Animal" Ciasullo — former soldier. Ciasullo was raised in Collinwood and became a debt collector, bookmaker and loan shark in the family under John Scalish and James Licavoli. He was believed by the FBI to have been a hitman. On July 21, 1976, Ciasullo was severely wounded in a bombing at his home in Richmond Heights. He died of natural causes in August 2016, at the age of 85.
- Pasquale "Butchie" Cisternino — former soldier. Cisternino assembled the bomb which killed Danny Greene in October 1977. He also pushed the control switch to detonate the bomb. Cisternino and seven others mobsters were arrested for Green's murder on December 5, 1977. He was convicted of a state murder charge in 1978. Cisternino died in 1990.
- Anthony "Tony Dope" Delsanter — former consigliere and leader of the Youngstown faction.
- John DeMarco — former consigliere. DeMarco was a member of Licatese faction. In June 1936, DeMarco and his cousin Angelo Lonardo murdered Dr. Joseph Romano, a surgeon and mafioso who had performed an operation on John DeMarco's brother, Licatese faction leader Dominic DeMarco, in which he died. DeMarco suspected that Romano had purposely botched the surgery. Because the killing of Romano, a former Mafia boss, had not been sanctioned by the Commission, DeMarco was sentenced to death. Alfred Polizzi had DeMarco pardoned by the Commission, however. He became consigliere to boss John Scalish and oversaw a large loansharking racket. In November 1957, DeMarco and Scalish were arrested while attending the Apalachin meeting when the summit was raided by the New York State Police. DeMarco died from natural causes in 1972.
- William E. "Billy D" DiLeno — former soldier. DiLeno was a member of the Eastside faction of the Cleveland family. He was initiated into the family in the early 1990s. DiLeno died of natural causes at the age of 85, on April 6, 2022.
- Joseph Charles "Joey" Gallo — former capo. In May 1975, Gallo, along with William Kiraly, carried out an assassination attempt on Irish mob boss Danny Greene by bombing Greene's apartment in Cleveland's Collinwood neighborhood, although Greene survived. Gallo was subsequently charged in the bombing and went into hiding, although police discovered an ammunition dump during a search of his Warrensville Heights apartment. He was arrested in Florida in 1976 and acquitted after a witness to the bombing failed to positively identify him. Gallo ascended the ranks in the Cleveland family to become a senior lieutenant to acting boss Angelo Lonardo after a series of prosecutions resulting from the October 1977 car bomb murder of Greene left a power vacuum in the organization. Beginning in 1978, he supervised a criminal enterprise which controlled gambling and narcotics distribution in Cleveland. On October 27, 1981, Gallo and two associates, Glen Pauley and Antonio Baudo, were convicted of arson and aggravated arson in the December 23, 1980 firebombing of the Chryco Credit Union office in Macedonia. He was sentenced to seven-to-25 years in prison. Gallo and Thomas Sinito directed and financed a drug ring managed by Carmen Zagaria which accumulated $15 million per year dealing cocaine, marijuana, hashish, methaqualone, LSD and PCP, and committed seven murders. The members of the drug ring were indicted in 1982 following a 29-month investigation codenamed Operation Busmark by the Cleveland Strike Force, a federal and local law enforcement task force involving the FBI, the Cleveland Division of Police, the Cuyahoga County Sheriff's Office, and the Narcotic and Dangerous Drug Section of the Justice Department. On January 24, 1983, Gallo was convicted on federal racketeering and drug trafficking charges under the RICO Act and Continuing Criminal Enterprise Statute. He was sentenced by U.S. District Judge John Manos to life in prison without parole on April 7, 1983. Gallo died at the United States Medical Center for Federal Prisoners in Springfield, Missouri on April 3, 2013, aged 75.
- Joseph "Joe Loose" Iacobacci — powerful member of the family, serving as boss from 1993 to 2005. Iacobacci was able to partially rebuild the family, with the help of the Chicago Outfit. He died in April 2020.
- Anthony "Tony Lib" Liberatore — former boss. Liberatore was tried in state court for the October 1977 murder of Danny Greene. His trial ended in a hung jury in 1978.
- James T. "Jack White" Licavoli — former boss. Licavoli headed the Cleveland Mafia's Youngstown faction before becoming boss of the crime family following the death of John Scalish in 1976. He and seven other mobsters were arrested for Danny Greene's October 1977 murder on December 5, 1977. Licavoli was acquitted of a state murder charge in 1978. On July 8, 1982, Licavoli was convicted of federal racketeering charges related to Greene's killing. He was sentenced on July 30, 1982 to seventeen years in prison.
- Calogero "Leo Lips" Moceri — former underboss. Moceri was initially affiliated with the Toledo faction of the Detroit Partnership and the Los Angeles family. He was a cousin of James Licavoli. In 1952, Moceri was arrested in Los Angeles and questioned over the 1947 murder of Benjamin "Bugsy" Siegel and four murders in Toledo, but was not charged. He later became involved in organized crime in Northeast Ohio. Moceri was indicted on federal tax evasion charges in 1963, and was acquitted in 1965. In 1965, his home in Northampton Township was destroyed in an arson. Moceri and Licavoli oversaw rackets in Youngstown before Moceri became Licavoli's underboss when Licavoli took over the Cleveland family in 1976. He was also the leader of the family's Akron faction. Moceri disappeared, aged 69, on August 22, 1976; his killing was arranged by rival racketeer John Nardi and carried out by Keith Ritson, an enforcer for the Irish mob boss Danny Greene. Moceri's Lincoln Continental Mark III automobile, with a pool of his blood in the trunk, was discovered in the parking lot of a Holiday Inn in Fairlawn on September 1, 1976.
- Cosmo Quattrone — former acting capo. Quattrone was the brother-in-law and second-in-command to Vincenzo Tripodi, the head of the Cleveland Mafia's Steubenville, Ohio faction. Tripodi and Quattrone controlled the Steubenville rackets for decades beginning in the 1920s. After Quattrone's bar and supper club headquarters, the Baron, was robbed by a Cleveland gang in 1956, Quattrone placed murder contracts on the gang's leaders, Dominick Marfici and Vincent Innocenzi, who were subsequently killed. Quattrone died in 1986, aged 85.
- Giuseppe "Dr. Joe" Romano — former acting boss. Romano, a physician and Mafia member, was a rival of the Licatese faction during the Corn Sugar Wars. He served as acting boss of the crime family after Frank Milano fled to Mexico in 1935. Romano performed a surgery on Dominic DeMarco, the leader of the Licatese faction, during which DeMarco died. The Licatese mobsters suspected that Romano had purposefully killed DeMarco during the operation. In retaliation, Romano was lured to the residence of an acquaintance in Lake County on June 9, 1936 under the pretence of making a house call, where he was ambushed and shot to death by John DeMarco and Angelo Lonardo, the brother and cousin of Dominic DeMarco. John DeMarco was condemned to death by the Commission for killing a Mafia boss without authorization but was spared after Alfred Polizzi interceded.
- Thomas James "Tommy the Chinaman" Sinito — former capo. Sinito was one of eight mobsters arrested for the October 1977 car bomb murder of Danny Greene on December 5, 1977. He had been involved in the taping of Greene's telephone calls prior to his killing.
- Vincenzo "Jimmy" Tripodi — former capo. Tripodi was a member of the Cleveland family's Calabrian faction and became the leader of the organization's Steubenville, Ohio wing in the late 1920s. He controlled the territory for decades with the aide of his closest associate, Cosmo Quattrone. Tripodi also maintained close links to Pittsburgh family capo Antonio Ripepi and Rocco Pellegrino of the Genovese family. A prolific bootlegger and alleged hitman, Tripodi was acquitted of the murder of Dominic Spinetti in 1936. He was also arrested but never prosecuted for the killings of Jimmy Fratini and the Diego Delisa. Tripodi served three years in federal prison for a weapons conviction. Tripodi retired from racketeering in the late 1970s and died from natural causes in 1987, aged 88.

== Former associates ==
- Antonio "Tony" Baudo — former associate. On October 27, 1981, Baudo and two others were convicted of arson and aggravated arson in the December 23, 1980 firebombing of the Chryco Credit Union office in Macedonia. The firebomb attack was ordered by capo Joseph Gallo and carried out by associate Glen Pauley after Baudo had allegedly asked Gallo for a retribution against the credit union. He was sentenced to seven-to-25 years in prison.
- Joseph F. "Joey Bugs" Bonarrigo — former associate. On June 23, 1976, Bonarrigo and Glen Pauley were arrested in connection with a disturbance in Cleveland and charged with disorderly conduct, of which Bonarrigo was convicted and fined $250. In September 1976, Bonarrigo allegedly took part in the attempted shooting of labor racketeer John Nardi outside the Italian-American Brotherhood Club in Cleveland's Little Italy. In 1977, a dispute occurred between Bonarrigo and his one-time ally Henry Grecco after Grecco refused to assist in making a bomb to kill Mario Durrant, a local businessman who had resisted attempts by Pasquale Cisternino to place vending machines on his premises, and informed Durrant of the bomb plot. Bonarrigo shot and killed Grecco in his girlfriend's car on Cleveland's Northeast Side on May 29, 1977. He was charged with aggravated murder in the killing. On July 6, 1978, Bonarrigo was sentenced to 15 years-to-life after being convicted of Grecco's murder, but was released on bond pending an appeal. In 1980, Thomas Sinito reported to James Licavoli and Angelo Lonardo that Bonarrigo had allegedly made direct murder threats against the pair. Although it is more likely that Sinito's claim that Bonarrigo had threatened to kill the crime family leaders was a ruse to eliminate Bonarrigo, a rival of Sinito in the drug business, Licavoli and Lonardo permitted Sinito to arrange a contract killing, and the assignment was delegated to Joseph Iacobacci, who recruited Hells Angels member Frank Fencl to carry out the execution. On March 7, 1980, Bonarrigo was found dead, aged 29, in a plastic garbage bag, bound, gagged and shot five times in the head, outside a vacant house on the East Side of Cleveland.
- Frederick "Fritz" Graewe — former associate. Frederick Graewe was the younger brother of Hartmut Graewe. In 1978, he became a member of a drug ring headed by Carmen Zagaria, which operated until its members were indicted in 1982. On January 24, 1983, Graewe was acquitted of engaging in a continuing criminal enterprise but convicted on eight drug-related charges. He was sentenced to 42 years in federal prison on April 7, 1983. Graewe was released on May 15, 1992. He died on February 24, 2019, at the age of 66.
- Hartmut "Hans the Surgeon" Graewe — former associate. Graewe was born in Germany and raised in the Tremont neighborhood of Cleveland. He was the older brother of Frederick Graewe. Graewe was convicted of involvement in the 1972 killing of his wife. After his release from prison, Graewe became an enforcer and hitman for a drug ring led by Carmen Zagaria, specializing in the dismemberment of murder victims. He committed a number of killings, including that of Keith Ritson in 1978. In 1981, the FBI raided Graewe's trailer home located on a farm in Guernsey County, searching the property for the remains of victims. Although no bodies were recovered, nineteen firearms were found hidden in the walls of the trailer. Zagaria's drug ring was broken up in 1982 when its members were indicted. On January 24, 1983, Graewe was convicted on federal racketeering and drug trafficking charges, which included six murders, under the RICO Act and Continuing Criminal Enterprise Statute. He was sentenced on April 7, 1983 to life in prison. Graewe died at the Federal Medical Center in Fort Worth, Texas on October 27, 2023, aged 78.
- Henry "Boom Boom" Grecco — former associate. Grecco was a Cleveland Mafia associate and explosives expert. He was a member of the hit team that planned and carried out the May 17, 1977 car bomb murder of labor racketeer John Nardi. Grecco had a dispute with former ally Joseph Bonarrigo over a plot to bomb a local businessman, Mario Durrant, when Grecco refused to assist in making a bomb and warned Durrant of the plot. On May 29, 1977, Grecco met Bonarrigo at the Italian-American Citizens Club. Afterwards, he was shot and killed, aged 42, by Bonarrigo as he sat in his girlfriend's car near his home on Cleveland's Northeast Side. He was also presumably killed as part of a "clean-up" from the Nardi hit. Grecco's body was found in Summit County on July 1, 1977.
- William "Mo" Kiraly — former associate. In May 1975, Kiraly, along with Joseph Gallo, carried out a failed assassination attempt on Irish mob boss Danny Greene by bombing his apartment in the Collinwood neighborhood of Cleveland. Greene and his girlfriend, Denise Schmidt, survived the bombing. Kiraly was charged in the bombing and went into hiding before surrendering to authorities. He was convicted of aggravated arson and conspiracy to commit aggravated murder.
- Joseph B. "Joe" Kovach Jr. — former associate. Kovach was a Cleveland Mafia associate and Teamsters union enforcer. During the crime family's war with Danny Greene, Kovach was shot dead outside his home on August 22, 1976.
- Kevin Joseph "Red" McTaggart — former associate. McTaggart was originally a member of Danny Greene's gang. He became second-in-command of Greene's "Celtic Club" during his war against the Cleveland Mafia. On August 16, 1976, McTaggart and Keith Ritson were arrested after being stopped by police while cruising around the West Side of Cleveland in a vehicle camouflaged to resemble an unmarked detective car in possession of a pistol, a shotgun and several maps indicating locations of the residences of several Greene targets, including Eugene Ciasullo, Alfred Calabrese, and Joseph Kovach, who was killed six days later. McTaggart joined the crime family following Greene's October 1977 murder. In the summer of 1978, he and other gangsters from the West Side formed a joint venture with East Side mobsters in a shared barboot game. Although McTaggart was not a full partner in the barboot game, he received a share of the game's receipts. He also worked for Ritson selling cocaine and marijuana. After Ritson was killed in November 1978, McTaggart began sourcing drugs from Carmen Zagaria. He became a large-scale narcotics trafficker and mob enforcer, and served as the liaison between underboss Angelo Lonardo and the Cleveland Hells Angels chapter. McTaggart was involved in the murders of William Bostic, Curtis Conley, and David Hardwicke. In 1982, McTaggart and other members of Zagaria's drug ring were indicted. He was convicted under the RICO Act and Continuing Criminal Enterprise Statute on January 24, 1983 of federal racketeering and drug trafficking charges, which included six murders. On April 7, 1983, McTaggart was sentenced to life in prison. In September 2020, McTaggart filed for a resentencing. His appeal to U.S. District Judge John R. Adams was supported by politician Edward Feighan and former Cleveland Browns football player Bernie Kosar.
- John A. Nardi — former associate. Nardi was born in Cleveland's Little Italy on January 21, 1916. Through Anthony Milano, his uncle via marriage, Nardi became involved in vending machine racketeering in the 1950s. He was the secretary-treasurer of the Teamsters' Vending Machine Local 410. Nardi aspired to become boss of the Cleveland family despite never being "made". He became increasingly subversive towards the Mafia before aligning with Danny Greene's Irish mob gang during his war against the crime family, which broke out following the death of John Scalish. In August 1976, Nardi and Greene arranged the murder of underboss Calogero Moceri. In September 1976, Nardi survived being shot at six times as he left the Italian-American Brotherhood Club on Mayfield Road in Little Italy. On May 17, 1977, Nardi was killed in a car bombing outside Teamsters Joint Council Local 41 in Downtown Cleveland.
- Glenn W. Pauley — former associate. Pauley served as the vice president of Local 707 of the National Production Workers Union. He was involved in an extortion attempt against pornography mogul Reuben Sturman, demanding £2,000 per week from Sturman on behalf of Anthony Delsanter and Calogero Moceri, who in turn were acting under the orders of Dominic Brooklier and Samuel Sciortino of the Los Angeles family. On June 23, 1976, Pauley was arrested along with Joseph Bonarrigo after a disturbance in Cleveland and charged with disorderly conduct, of which he was convicted and fined $150. In September 1976, Pauley and other mobsters allegedly carried out the attempted shooting of labor racketeer John Nardi in Cleveland's Little Italy. On December 23, 1980, Pauley carried out the firebombing of the Chryco Credit Union office in Macedonia on the orders of Joseph Gallo, who organized the attack at the request of Antonio Baudo. On October 27, 1981, Pauley, Gallo and Baudo were convicted of arson and aggravated arson. Pauley was sentenced to seven-to-25 years in prison. On June 23, 1981, Pauley was arrested for weapon possession when he was spotted carrying a concealed pistol by DEA agents at a Downtown Cleveland bar. He was acquitted of carrying a concealed weapon but convicted of having a weapon while under disability.
- Keith Michael "The Enforcer" Ritson — former associate. Ritson was bodyguard of Danny Greene who joined the Cleveland family after Greene was murdered in 1977. In early 1978, Ritson began cooperating with Carmen Zagaria in marijuana deals, and in the summer of 1978, he and other West Side gangsters united with mobsters from the East Side to partner in a barboot game jointly sponsored by both factions. In August 1978, Ritson took on a murder contract to kill the mob attorney Harvey Rieger but failed to carry out the hit. He began making threats against James Licavoli, Angelo Lonardo and Thomas Sinito. Zagaria, James Coppola, and Hartmut Graewe, who suspected Ritson of being an informant, decided to kill him. On November 16, 1978, Ritson was shot and killed by Graewe in a pet store owned by Zagaria. Graewe and Zagaria disposed of his body in a pond at an abandoned stone quarry in Lorain County. Ritson's remains were recovered by FBI divers on October 14, 1982.
- Milton "Maishe" Rockman — former associate. Rockman was a Jewish-American organized crime figure affiliated with the Cleveland crime family. Rockman was the brother-in-law of Cleveland crime family bosses John T. Scalish and Angelo Lonardo, and was a top Cleveland crime family associate involved in labor racketeering and the Las Vegas casino interests of the Cleveland Mafia.

== Government informants and witnesses ==
- James K. Coppola — Associate and gambling and narcotics operative of capo Thomas "The Chinaman" Sinito. He was a tavern owner and became part of the West Side bookmaking group that also included Danny Greene in 1974. A year after Greene's car bomb-murder in 1977, Coppola, drug dealer Carmen "Mr. C" Zagaria and their partners, on instruction from Sinito, established a joint East Side-West Side barbotte game to generate proceeds for the family. He was involved in the murder of peddler Keith Ritson, one of the game's organizers, after he failed to carry out a hit on fraudster attorney Harvey Rieger for which Coppola had forwarded him a $2,500 advance from Sinito: Ritson was shot dead by associate Hartmut "Hans" Graewe after Coppola lured him to Zagaria's tropical fish store on November 16, 1978. Coppola and Longshoremen's official Chauncey J. Baker were arrested for the assault of police patrolman Alan Simon in 1979. He also later entered the cannabis and cocaine trade, supplying Greene's former enforcer Kevin McTaggart with product for distribution. Coppola later testified against his former associates, including the Graewe brothers, in 1982, having been awarded federal protection by authorities in exchange for information on the gambling-narcotics ring.
- Anthony P. Delmonti — associate involved in narcotics trafficking. He was sentenced to six years' imprisonment in 1987 after being informed on by his cocaine supplier, Carmen Zagaria. Owing $150,000 in restitution and addicted to drugs, Delmonti became a confidential informant for the FBI in 1998. Following a series of successful prosecutions resulting from Delmonti's cooperation, he went into hiding in Marco Island, Florida and died from a heart attack on April 26, 2007, aged 61.
- Raymond W. "Ray" Ferritto — former associate. In 1977, Erie, Pennsylvania hitman Ferritto was contracted by James Licavoli to kill Teamsters union leader John Nardi and Irish mob boss Danny Greene. Although he was unable to kill Nardi, Ferritto played a pivotal role in the October 1977 murder of Greene, driving the car from which Greene's bombing death was carried out. The bomb was detonated by an accomplice, Ronald Carabbia. Ferritto was arrested after an eyewitness gave the license plate of the car he was driving to Lyndhurst police. He subsequently agreed to cooperate with authorities in exchange for a reduced plea. Ferritto died from congestive heart failure in Sarasota, Florida on May 10, 2004, aged 75.
- Angelo Anthony "Big Ange" Lonardo — former underboss and acting boss. Lonardo was the brother-in-law of John Scalish. He became acting boss of the crime family after James Licavoli was imprisoned. Lonardo turned government witness in 1983 after being sentenced to life imprisonment for drug trafficking and racketeering.
- Jackie Presser — associate. Presser was a labor union official and Teamsters president under control of the Cleveland family who became a confidential informant for the FBI in 1972.
- Carmen P. "Mr. C" Zagaria — former soldier. Zagaria headed a gang based on the West Side of Cleveland which joined forces with the Cleveland Mafia, which operated from the city's East Side, in 1978 to control drug distribution and gambling operations. He owned a tropical fish store on Lorain Avenue, which he used as a front for his illegal activities. Zagaria managed a drug ring financed by Angelo Lonardo which trafficked cocaine, marijuana and Quaaludes to Cleveland from Florida. The ring also committed several murders. In 1982, Zagaria and five other members of the drug ring were indicted after a 29-month investigation codenamed Operation Busmark by the Cleveland Strike Force, a federal and local law enforcement task force involving the FBI, the Cleveland Division of Police, the Cuyahoga County Sheriff's Office, and the Narcotic and Dangerous Drug Section of the Justice Department. He pleaded guilty to federal racketeering and narcotics charges in October 1982 and agreed to testify for the government in exchange for a leniency. Zagaria was sentenced to thirty years in prison and testified that he and his gang had profited from a $15 million-a-year drug racket and committed seven killings.

== List of murders committed by the Cleveland crime family ==
Name	Date	Reason
Salvatore Todaro	June 11, 1929	Cleveland crime family boss Todaro was shot by Angelo Lonardo and Dominic Sospirato, the son and nephew, respectively, of Joseph Lonardo, as revenge for killing the elder Lonardo.
Giuseppe "Dr. Joe" Romano	June 9, 1936	59-year-old Romano, the acting boss of the Cleveland Mafia and a practicing physician, had killed mobster Dominic DeMarco during surgery. He was lured to a home in Lake County and shot by John DeMarco and Angelo Lonardo. Romano's body was left in an automobile in Moreland Hills.
Dominick "Dom" Marfici	March 15, 1957	Marfici was a leader of a Cleveland gang which robbed the Baron, a restaurant in Steubenville owned by Cleveland Mafia soldier Cosmo Quattrone in 1956. He was shot while in hiding in Buffalo, New York, allegedly killed by Anthony Buffa on Quattrone's orders.
Santino Joseph "Sandy" Naples and Mary Ann Vranich	March 11, 1960	28-year old Vranich was the girlfriend of Naples. 52-year old Naples served as a Pittsburgh family soldier, and was killed by a shotgun blast along with Vranich by the Cleveland family on the porch of Vranich’s house. Naples may have had been one of the first casualties in the Pittsburgh-Cleveland Mafia gang war of the 1960s.
Vincent "Vince" Innocenzi	August 6, 1960	39-year-old Cleveland family associate Innocenzi had taken part in the 1956 robbery of the Mafia-owned Baron restaurant in Steubenville and carried out a failed bombing attempt on Pittsburgh family associate Joseph Romano in Youngstown in 1960. He was shot several times in the head and found in a ditch in a wooded area near Akron.
Billy Naples	July 1, 1962	Naples served as a Pittsburgh family associate, and the younger brother of Sandy Naples whom was also gunned down in March 1960. 39-year old Naples was killed by the Cleveland family during the 1960s Mafia war. Naples was killed by a car bomb at his home located at 505 Carlotta Drive.
John A. Nardi	May 17, 1977	Nardi, a 61-year-old Cleveland family associate and labor racketeer, allied himself with Irish mob boss Danny Greene in his war against the Mafia in an attempt to take control of the crime family. He and Greene organized the August 23, 1976 murder of underboss Calogero Moceri. On September 10, 1976, Nardi survived a shooting attempt in Cleveland's Little Italy. He was then killed with a car bomb outside Teamsters Joint Council Local 41 at 2070 East 22nd Street in Downtown Cleveland.
Henry "Boom Boom" Grecco	May 29, 1977	Grecco, a 42-year-old Cleveland Mafia associate and explosives expert, was involved in a dispute with Joseph Bonarrigo over a bomb plot. He was shot and killed by Bonarrigo in a car at Wayside Avenue and East 186th Street on the Northeast Side of Cleveland. He was also presumably killed as part of a "clean-up" after he took part in the murder of John Nardi. Grecco's body was found in Summit County on July 1, 1977.
Daniel John "Danny the Irishman" Greene	October 6, 1977	47-year-old Greene led a rival gang based on the West Side of Cleveland which challenged the Mafia for control of local rackets. On May 12, 1975, he survived the bombing of his apartment at 15805 Waterloo Road in Cleveland's Collinwood by Joseph Gallo and William Kiraly. Two years later, Greene was killed in a car bombing by Ray Ferritto and Ronald Carabbia in the parking lot of a dentist's office at 29001 Cedar Road in Lyndhurst.
Keith Michael "The Enforcer" Ritson	November 16, 1978	Ritson, a 32-year-old former hit man for Danny Greene, resisted the Cleveland Mafia's efforts to consolidate the remnants of Greene's gang by refusing to carry out a murder contract and making threats against James Licavoli and Angelo Lonardo. He was also suspected of being an informant and had killed Cleveland family underboss Calogero Moceri while working for Greene in 1976. Ritson was lured to a pet store owned by Carmen Zagaria and shot by Hartmut Graewe. Ritson's body was dumped by Zagaria and Graewe in a pond at an abandoned stone quarry in Lorain County, where it was found on October 14, 1982.
Charles F. "Spider" Grisham	December 3, 1978	Pittsburgh crime family associate Grisham was killed with a sniper rifle by Joseph DeRose, Jr. in Howland Township, Ohio after he and James Cononico attempted to take over gambling rackets in Warren, Ohio controlled by Cleveland crime family associate Joseph Perfette.
James "Peeps" Cononico	January 11, 1979	Cononico, an associate of Charles Grisham, was shot by Joseph DeRose, Jr. in Youngstown, Ohio.
Bobby Furey	April 12, 1979	Furey served as a driver for Joey Naples, who was later murdered in August 1991. It is believed Furey was murdered for a dispute between figures from the underworld operating in Mahoning Valley.
Jack R. "Black Jack" Tobin	July 25, 1979	Tobin, a bookmaker, nightclub owner and Pittsburgh crime family associate, was killed with a shotgun after engaging in a gunfight with by Joseph DeRose, Jr. in Austintown Township, Ohio during a gang war between the Cleveland and Pittsburgh crime families over racket territory in the Mahoning Valley.
John Magda	January 6, 1980	An enforcer for Jack Tobin, Magda was asphyxiated by Joseph DeRose, Jr. and his body was found in a garbage dump in Struthers, Ohio.
Robert J. DeCerbo	February 13, 1980	DeCerbo was killed with a shotgun by Joseph DeRose, Jr. in Beaver Township, Ohio after switching sides from the Cleveland faction to the Pittsburgh faction during the Mahoning Valley mob war.
Joseph F. "Joey Bugs" Bonarrigo	March 6, 1980	Thomas Sinito alleged that 29-year old Cleveland family associate Bonarrigo had made death threats against James Licavoli and Angelo Lonardo, who permitted Sinito to arrange his murder. Sinito delegated the contract to Joseph Iacobacci, who recruited Hells Angels member Frank Fencl to kill Bonarrigo. He was found dead on March 7, 1980, bound, gagged and shot five times in the head in a plastic garbage bag outside a vacant house on Cleveland's East Side.
William A. "Billy" Bostic	June 18, 1980	38-year-old Bostic was a member of Danny Greene's gang who later operated a gambling house in Linndale in association with the Cleveland Mafia. After he refused to share the proceeds of a craps game with his partners, Bostic was lured to Carmen Zagaria's pet store, where he was shot by Hartmut Graewe and Kevin McTaggart. Graewe dismembered Bostic's body, which was buried in rural Ashtabula County. Bostic's partial remains were discovered on August 18, 1980 and identified in September 1981.
Dominic "Junior" Senzarino	October 2, 1980	Senzarino was shot and killed by a shotgun blast outside of his home located at Saginaw Drive in Poland Township, Ohio. Senzarino was murdered by the Pittsburgh family, with Robert Dorler was later charged in the murder, dying in prison in 2008 at the age of 73. Senzarino was also the couson of Charles Carabbia, who would also later be gunned down in December 1980.
Charles "Charlie the Crab" Carabbia	December 13, 1980	Carabbia was a prominent figure in the Cleveland family during the 1970s and heavily involved in illegal gambling. According to the testimony of former Pittsburgh family capo, Lenny Strollo, Carabbia was set up by Strollo and was last seen alive with Jimmy Prato enroute to a meeting located at the Stardust Motel in North Lima, Ohio. In August 1982, Carabbia's name was mentioned for bribes amounting to $98,000 and raising money for the campaign of James Traficant, the former Sheriff of Mahoning County and later the U.S. House of Representative from Ohio. Traficant was acquitted in June 1983, although he would later be sentenced to 8 years in prison in July 2002 on charges of bribery, racketeering and tax evasion.
David Perrier	January 4, 1981	Cleveland crime family associate David "Cowboy" Perrier was shot by Thomas Sinito and found dead in a ditch in Trumbull County, Ohio due to suspicions that he was an informant and after he had insulted family boss James Licavoli.
Joseph Giaimo	January 17, 1981	Giaimo was an alleged drug dealer active in the Cleveland and Florida area. Giaimo was shot twice in the head by Fritz Graewe with the assistance of Carmine Zagaria on orders of Tommy Sinito and Joe Gallo, not to be confused with Joe Gallo from the Colombo family.
Joe De Rose Sr.	February 25, 1981	61-year-old De Rose Sr. was killed by a shotgun blast outside of his home located at 8126 Deerpath Dr. in Youngstown, Ohio. It is believed De Rose was killed as a mistaken identity with the intended target being his son, Joe De Rose Jr., whom was later gunned down in April 1981.
Charles J. "Chuck" Rini	March 30, 1981	41-year-old Cleveland family associate Rini disappeared after he allegedly stole from capo Joseph Gallo in a diamond deal.
Joe "Little Joey D" De Rose, Jr.	April 18, 1981	32-year old De Rose was last seen alive enroute to an apartment belonging to his girlfriend. De Rose was linked to five murders, serving as the shooter in the murders including Spider Gresham, Peeps Cononico, Black Jack Tobin, Johnny Magda and Bobby De Cerbo. In February 1981, his father was also gunned down, allegedly as a mistaken identity, with the real targeting being De Rose Jr. It is believed De Rose was killed by the Joey Naples faction for control of the rackets in Mahoning Valley. In February 2002, Samuel "Skinny Sam" Fossesca was indicted for the De Rose murder, however Fossesca died of a heart attack in August 2004 before the trial was concluded.
Peter Vincent Cascarelli	September 24, 1981	39-year old Cascarelli was killed as he was suspected of being an informant. Cascarelli was affiliated and worked directly for Joey Naples as an enforcer for the Cleveland family and heavily involved in the illegal lottery racket based in Youngstown, Ohio.
Joseph "Joey" Naples, Jr.	August 19, 1991	58-year old Naples was a reputed capo for the Cleveland family. Naples was shot by using a high-powered rifle from across the street of his new home located at 3240 Lynn Road, Beaver Township, in Youngstown, Ohio. The murder of Naples remains unsolved.
Michael A. Roman	November 23, 1994	26-year old Roman was an alleged drug dealer involved in the sale and trafficking of heroin. Roman was shot 3 times in the chest by Samuel Bulgin. It is believed his murder was served as a warning to his friend, Paul Wiesenbach. In June 1998, Bulgin was sentenced to 25 years in prison.

== In popular culture ==
The 2011 biopic crime film Kill the Irishman highlights three prominent figures in the Cleveland crime family: James "Jack White" Licavoli (the boss of the Cleveland crime family from 1976 to 1985), John Nardi (a key associate of the Cleveland crime family and nephew of Anthony Milano, the longest-serving underboss of the Cleveland crime family), and Ray Ferritto (a notorious hitman who worked for both the Cleveland crime family and the Los Angeles crime family). They are played respectively by Tony Lo Bianco (Licavoli), Vincent D'Onofrio (Nardi) and Robert Davi (Ferritto).

== See also ==
- Crime in Ohio
- List of Italian Mafia crime families

== Sources ==
=== Books ===
- Porrello, Rick (1995). The Rise and Fall of the Cleveland Mafia: Corn, Sugar, and Blood. New York: Barricade Books. ISBN 9781569800584.
- Miller, Carol Poh; Wheeler, Robert A. (1997). Cleveland: A Concise History, 1796-1996. Bloomington, Ind.: Indiana University Press. ISBN 9780253211477.
- Capeci, Jerry (2002). The Complete Idiot's Guide to the Mafia. Santa Barbara, Calif.: Alpha Books. ISBN 9781592573059.
- Griffin, Joe; DeNevi, Don (2002). Mob Nemesis: How the FBI Crippled Organized Crime. Amherst, N.Y.: Prometheus Books. ISBN 9781573929196.
- Anderson, Raymond G. (2003). "Beer". Alcohol and Temperance in Modern History: An International Encyclopedia. Volume 1. Santa Barbara, Calif.: ABC-CLIO. ISBN 9781576078334.
- Porrello, Rick (2004). To Kill the Irishman: The War that Crippled the Mafia. Novelty, Ohio: Next Hat Press. ISBN 9780966250893.
- Bonocore, Joseph (2005). Raised Italian-American: Stories, Values and Traditions From the Italian Neighborhood. New York: iUniverse. ISBN 9780595357215.
- DeVico, Peter J. (2007). The Mafia Made Easy: The Anatomy and Culture of La Cosa Nostra. Mustang, Okla.: Tate Publishing. ISBN 9781602472549.
- Mitchell, Sandy (2008). Cleveland's Little Italy. Charleston, S.C.: Arcadia Publishing. ISBN 9780738552132.
- McCarthy, Dennis M.P. (2011). An Economic History of Organized Crime: A National and Transnational Approach. New York: Routledge. ISBN 9780415487962.
- Martinelli, Patricia A. (2011). True Crime: The State's Most Notorious Criminal Cases. Mechanicsburg, Pa.: Stackpole Books. ISBN 9780811744409.
- May, Allan R. (2014). The Sly-Fanner Murders: The Birth of the Mayfield Road Mob, Cleveland's Most Notorious Mafia Gang. Cleveland: Con-Allan Press. ISBN 9780983703747.

=== Reports ===
- Keeney, John C. (January 31, 1984). Organized Crime in the Great Lakes Region (PDF) (Report). Deputy Assistant Attorney General Criminal Division – via National Criminal Justice Reference Service.
- Celebrezze Jr., Anthony J. (1987). 1986 Report of the Organized Crime Consulting Committee (PDF) (Report). Attorney General of Ohio – via National Criminal Justice Reference Service.
- Permanent Subcommittee on Investigations (1988). Organized Crime 25 Years After Valachi: Hearings Before the Permanent Subcommittee on Investigations of the Committee on Governmental Affairs, United States Senate. S. Hrg. 100-906. 100th Cong., 2d sess. S. HRG.;100-906. Washington, D.C.: U.S. Government Printing Office. hdl:2027/mdp.39015028778994.
- Thurmond, Strom (1988). Organized Crime in America (PDF) (Report). National Institute of Justice – via United States Department of Justice.
- Richardson, A. (May 1991). Outlaw Motorcycle Gangs – USA Overview (PDF) (Report). State of California Department of Justice, Bureau of Organized Crime and Criminal Intelligence – via United States Department of Justice.
