= Thomas Sinito =

American mobster

Thomas James Sinito, also known as "The Chinaman" (September 18, 1938 − December 21, 1997), was a powerful caporegime in the Cleveland crime family who was once accused of plotting the assassination of then mayor of Cleveland, Ohio, Dennis J. Kucinich in 1979. Kucinich later became a candidate for the Democratic nomination for President of the United States in the 2004 and 2008 elections.

== Biography ==
=== Early life ===
Sinito was born on Woodland Ave in Cuyahoga County, Ohio. His father was a maternal cousin of the convicted corrupt Cleveland municipal prosecutor, Thomas Longo who represented the Bedford, Highland Hills and Chagrin Falls townships and was a candidate for the Bedford Municipal Judgship in May 1997. Sinito was the nephew of (Giuseppe Antonio Berardinelli) Joey Maxim by marriage, the legendary Italian-American boxer who became the 1952 Lightweight Boxing Champion of the World.

Thomas Sinito married Irene B. Mitroff in 1960 and they had two children. In 1990, Irene died in a Lake Erie boating accident. After divorcing Irene, Sinito took a second wife, Kristine, with whom he had a daughter.

=== Early association with the Cleveland family ===
Thomas Sinito's involvement with the Cleveland family Capo, Angelo "Big Ange" Lonardo began when he worked as a bartender at Angelo's Highlander Restaurant and Lounge on Northfield Road. Prior to this acquaintance, he had served many years as an errand boy for the mob, tending various vending machine routes. Later, Sinito had several of his own ventures, including part ownership in a Valley Forge, Pennsylvania amusement park. This amusement park provided an ingenious way to launder money undetected, which came from various gambling, drug trafficking and loansharking pursuits, through the amusement park's cash flow.

Sinito had a wide assortment of interest and investments in both legitimate as well as illegitimate businesses. Sinito cautiously invested in many illegitimate business holdings, and greatly profited from the investments he made. Locally, he entered the vending machine business with lucrative washer and dryer accounts at numerous apartment buildings. Sinito also ran some coin-operated vending machine routes, from which he derived a significant bulk of his earnings. His business front was a gift basket company, on Chagrin Boulevard, once a favored area for Mob business and socialization.

In addition to the gift basket shop Sinito opened in Beachwood, Ohio, he also co-owned the Appliance Mart with his brother Chuck. The Appliance Mart was a business front for the Cleveland family. The mart, which opened in 1972, had two locations, one in Euclid, Ohio and the other in Bedford, Ohio on Northfield Road. The Bedford store soon became a major base of operations for Sinito, from which he regularly met with Lonardo and other mobsters, discussed various illegal activities, short term as well as long--term criminal plots, schemes and scams, and operated various illegal activities. Detailed plans for drug trafficking, conspiracies to kill police informers and other violent measures were conceived and acted on from meetings in the back rooms of Appliance Mart.

Sinito was a talented extortionist and operated a lucrative loansharking scheme out of Appliance Mart. Appliance Mart would extend credit to customers it knew weren't credit-worthy and then use forceful extortion tactics to make good on the payment. One of the victims of this loansharking scheme included a small-time career criminal named Carmen "Jinglebells" Zagaria, who would later become a partner with Sinito and manage a major drug trafficking ring. Zagaria owed Sinito a large amount of money, the interest on which grew larger and larger. Sinito and the other mob leaders controlled Zagaria as a result of the high interest on his loan shark debts.

=== The nickname ===
There are many stories on how Sinito acquired the nickname "The Chinaman". One version said that nickname derived from his eyes, which allegedly look slanted "like a Chinaman’s". Another version stated that the nickname described his silent, calm, stoic, disciplined and inscrutable demeanor, the stereotypical qualities of a Chinese man. Another version cited a resemblance to actor David Carradine to the television show Kung Fu, and to a claim that Sinito made karate chops when angry. However, the most popular story was that in either 1973 or 1974 Sinito allegedly threw 10 to 30 people out of a bar on Cleveland's West Side during a brawl.

=== Cleveland’s Model Cities scandal ===
Sinito was a minor figure involved in the 1973 Cleveland's Model Cities scandal. In August 1973, Robert Doggett was the director of the Model City program, which was a federal initiative created under President Lyndon B. Johnson’s Great Society Program during the 1970s. The program funneled millions of dollars into major cities in an effort to help the poor. Local Cleveland area civic and community groups were to determine how to use these funds. Originally the first planned amount was to be $45 million. A federal audit later undertaken by the GAO showed much of the Federal funds were wasted. The General Accounting Office's audit showed at least as much as $9.2 million were misspent on fraud and waste.

A prominent Cleveland mobster and drug trafficker Ronald Bey was hired by then Mayor Ralph J. Perk, into a high level administrative staff position, for the purpose of conducting a drug control feasibility study. An investigation of the corruption and graft in the Model Cities program lead to Mayor Perk’s administration. Bey worked in Mayor Perk’s administration, and appeared in several photographs alongside Mayor Perk. In spite of Perk’s protests that he didn’t know Bey worked for the City of Cleveland, the photographs of both men decorated city hall.

The mob wanted its front companies to receive the biggest contracts. While walking to his office on St. Clair, Doggett was shot in the stomach and nearly died. His would-be assassin was found a few days later, floating facedown in the Ohio River. The shooter's name was Gerald "Chick" Johnson, a former employee of a shady contractor who was seeking a city contract.

Bey became a suspect in the Robert Doggett shooting. Cleveland Police investigators uncovered information, that three days earlier, Doggett had refused to pay Bey's $3,111 fee on his service contract. A Special Grand Jury was convened to Investigate the Model Cities shooting. Its purpose was to investigate Doggett's shooting and how the Model Cities program was administered.

Sinito was one of the witnesses subpoenaed to testify. According to Sgt. Edward Kovacic, of the Cleveland Police intelligence unit, Johnson's car was leased from a dealership where Sinito worked. Although Sinito was granted immunity from any charges that might result from this Special Grand Jury's findings, he refused to cooperate, and testify before a grand jury. No individuals, including Bey, were ever indicted from the results of this Special Grand Jury.

=== Conflict with Danny Greene ===
In 1975, the legendary Irish-American mobster, Danny Greene began asserting himself in the vending machine racket, which had traditionally been a Mafia racket, and began muscling into many of the Cleveland Mafia's gambling operations. This greatly angered the Cleveland family leadership. According to a mob informant, this move brought him into conflict with Sinito. Sinito considered Greene an extortionist and felt that Greene's coined operated laundry contracts with their excessive fees were nothing more than extortion.

Danny Greene controlled some of the more lucrative laundry contracts which Sinito was competing for. Sinito and mob associate, Joseph "Joey Loose" Iacobacci soon murdered one of Greene's associates. Greene's response was to have one of his gang, possibly his cousin Kevin McTaggart, wire a bundle of dynamite to the frame of Sinito's car. Sinito found the bomb in his car, attached to the frame. He removed the bomb, disarmed it and later destroyed it. This act of war by Greene drew Sinito into the Mafia war with Greene in Cleveland during the 1970s, where he would play a significant role.

=== Kucinich assassination plot ===
As the Cleveland family waged its gang war against Danny Greene, newly elected Mayor Dennis J. Kucinich fought hard to sever the Mafia's old ties to local government. In 1977, Kucinich mandated that all city contracts Cleveland had with various companies would be re-evaluated. In an effort to save money for the financially strapped city, he would have these contracts re-bid on, with the contracts going to the lowest bidder. This decision put him at odds with the Cleveland Mob. That same year, Kucinich refused to sell Municipal Light, Cleveland's public power plant, to private interests that stood to financially gain from the purchase.

The Cleveland family didn't care whether or not Kucinch sold the Municipal Light system to the highest bidder, its sale didn't affect them. Re-bidding on the city contracts they held through various front companies would, however, adversely affect the Cleveland family's interests. The most coveted deal was the garbage-hauling contract once held by Danny Greene, before an associate of his named James Palladino took it over. Palladino made no secret of his contempt for Kucinich, after the mayor awarded the contract to another businessman not directly connected to organized crime.

Some city contracts, especially in garbage hauling, had been under total mob control since the late 1940s. When Kucinich announced in both daily papers, the Plain Dealer and the now defunct Cleveland Press, that he planned to review all city held contracts and open them to the lowest outside bids, it greatly infuriated the Cleveland family hierarchy. Kucinich also began reviewing all of the garbage hauling contracts after coming to office. Every mob-held front company having any city contracts were to be investigated and criminal charges brought against the racketeers. This meant being convicted on federal racketeering charges under the Racketeer Influenced and Corrupt Organizations Act, with its stiff penalties, such as long jail sentences.

These aforementioned reasons propelled mob boss, James Licavoli, with the advice of Lonardo to order a hit on Kucinich in 1978. In face of some opposition by lower level associates, Sinito stubbornly defended Licavoli's decision and it was then decided to use the services of an outsider professional hitman, since using local associates for the job could trace back to them.

Sinito's uncle Joey Maxim, who worked in an Atlantic City casino helped him contact a contract killer. However, the supposed killer was, in fact, an undercover Maryland State Police officer using the name Gene, who specialized in posing as a contract killer. The two met in the Atlantic City casino where Maxim worked. Gene walked into the casino's lounge where he'd been told to meet Sinito. During the meeting, Sinito introduced himself only as Tommy and successfully hired Gene for the Assassination plot. Gene was initially paid $25,000 for his services. After the meeting, Gene informed Cleveland Police who soon made a connection to Sinito, after checking police records.

Several bizarre plans were discussed. One was to kill Kucinich as he left Tony's Diner on West 117th and Lorain Avenue. Gene would perch on an outside steel fire escape across the street, armed with a sniper rifle and shoot Kucinich when he came out of the diner. A second plan was to shoot Kucinich as he marched down Euclid Avenue in the 1979 Columbus Day Parade. But the hit didn't happen because an ulcer inside Kunicich's stomach burst before the event, and the mayor was rushed to the hospital. The assassination plot continued for three long years, but never came to fruition.

When Cleveland Trust called in long-standing debts in retaliation for Kucinich's refusal not to sell Municipal Light, the city went into default and Kucinich's popularity plummeted. The hit was eventually called off when Kucinich did not win reelection in 1979. Gene returned to Maryland. In 1984, the Kucinich plot would result in a probe into the Cleveland Mafia's part in the assassination plot. The plot to kill Kucinich was not made public until 1984. Even Kucinich had been kept in the dark. In the past, Kucinich has implied he believes it was divine intervention that kept him from the parade that day.

=== Made man ===
Due to his business prowess, Sinito soon acquired a reputation as an earner and gained a high level of trust in the Cleveland Family. His refusal to testify in the Model Cities scandal, as well as his active role in the Mafia's war with Danny Greene helped to cement this solid reputation within the family. He was very cautious in his dealings with others and extremely low profile, allowing him to slip away unknown and undetected from the attention of local law enforcement for a short period of time.

Unlike many of his fellow mobsters such as Carmen Zagaria, and Kevin McTaggart, Sinito was not a psychopath. Ever the diplomat, Sinito always preferred to primarily use reason rather than violence, when dealing with a problem. He saw murder only as a means of preventing treachery and protecting their interests and profits from their criminal enterprises. However, Sinito would never shy away from using violence or committing a murder to protect his or the family's interest, when the situation deemed it necessary. He was strictly Machiavellian in his decisions, using and manipulating others as he saw fit.

During the 1970s, Sinito became a regular at Jackie Presser’s restaurant "The Forge". These frequent visits to this notorious mob hangout brought him under Federal Bureau of Investigation (FBI) surveillance. Throughout this period, Sinito and his mob cohorts never realized that Presser, along with his business partner, Tony Hughes, were FBI informants. Presser had been feeding information to the FBI about Mafia activities since 1968.

When Lonardo was promoted to underboss in 1976, Sinito was given control over Lonardo's crew. Upon his promotion, Sinito also received a share of the profits which were regularly being skimmed from the Stardust, Fremont, and Desert Inn casinos in Las Vegas by the Chicago Outfit and the various mid-western Mafia families. The Cleveland family received a total of about $40,000 a month from the skim.

In the midst of the Mafia's war with Greene, Licavoli gained permission from Anthony Salerno, head of the Genovese crime family, to initiate ten new official members, including Thomas Sinito in 1977.

In 1979, Sinito together with his mob colleague, Joseph C. Gallo, was eventually made into the Cleveland family. The induction ceremony took place in a small private back room at the Italian-American brotherhood Club in Cleveland's Murray Hill district, on Mayfield Road. The sacred Mafia vow of Omerta was administered to the duo by the Underboss, Angelo "Big Ange" Lonardo. Also present in the ceremony was mob boss, James T. Licavoli, and Charlie Casra, a retired member of the Cleveland Family.

=== Involvement in the Zagaria drug trafficking network ===
After the assassination of Greene, Sinito became heavily involved in the drug trade. The underworld war with Greene and his subsequent assassination resulted in a massive federal crackdown that proved to be very costly and disastrous for the Cleveland family. Many high ranking mobsters were incarcerated and convicted for crimes related to the war, and the Cleveland family was losing a lot of money and potential profits due to these incidents. Determined to recover most of the profits lost, the Cleveland family soon turned to the previously taboo rackets of Narcotics trafficking. In spite of the official "no drugs" policy, Sinito engaged in drug trafficking for the family, and did so with the tacit approval of the imprisoned mob boss, James Licavoli. However, Licavoli's underboss, Angelo Lonardo, was totally opposed to drug dealing and unsuccessfully tried to steer Licavoli against it.

During this period, the Cleveland family was involved in a large-scale narcotics network that distributed and sold marijuana, cocaine, quaaludes, and other controlled substances. The narcotics network was overseen by Cleveland mobster, Carmen P. Zagaria, who was controlled in the operation by Sinito and another Capo, Joseph Charles Gallo. In spite of his Italian-American heritage and deep involvement in business dealings with the Cleveland family, Zagaria refused Gallo's offer to be "made" into the family, with the rank of a Caporegime. It is estimated that in 1981 alone, Zagaria's drug network brought in approximately $15 million and was considered the largest narcotics network in northeast Ohio.

Years later, while testifying in front of the US Senate, Lonardo testified that Sinito was running a major narcotics trafficking network for the Cleveland family in the late seventies. The profits were delivered up to Licavoli, with Sinito taking a cut. He also stated that, at that time, Sinito was known for organizing hits on anyone who crossed him, not only other drug dealers stepping on his turf, but friends, too.

The massive drug ring operation created by the merger of the smaller drug rings in the 1970s continued to operate and generate profit for the mob. It operated until the FBI arrested and got convictions to imprison the drug kingpins running it. Cocaine, marijuana, repackaged illegally obtained prescription drugs, hashish, LSD, PCP and heroin were sold through Zagaria's ring. Drug mules made regular deliveries of raw drugs to safe stash houses in Cleveland. The raw drugs would then be processed for street sales.

Zagaria recruited new street level workers to keep the drug operation running, money counting, distribution, mules, processing raw drugs for sale and selling the drugs. Some of these new recruits, Keith Ritson and Greene's cousin, Kevin McTaggart, were former members of the Celtic Club. The Gallo, Sinito and Zagaria drug operation flourished, a triumph for all of its managers. The Zagaria, Gallo and Sinito drug ring accounted for 40% of illegal drug sales in Cuyahoga County. The drug ring's activities drew the attention of the FBI and it began a two-year investigation of the drug ring's activities.

After becoming the focus of an FBI investigation codenamed "Operation Busmark", Carmen Zagaria was convicted in state court of selling drugs, and sentenced to 10 to 30 years in prison. He became a fugitive while out on bail, but gave himself up to the FBI at Holy Cross Cemetery on September 23, 1982. Facing the original conviction and sentence, additional federal drug charges, weapons charges, and potential indictments against his family members, Zagaria became a government witness and admitted to leading a drug enterprise and over 19 murders committed by the network.

With his near photographic memory, Zagaria's testimony would prove incriminating and quite damaging to his former crime associates. He would go on to testify against Sinito, Angelo Lonardo, Joseph C. Gallo and Kevin McTaggart for vast narcotics dealings and the 19 murders.

=== The Perrier and Bonarrigo murders ===
Sinito was involved in the murder of a Cleveland gangster named Joseph Bonarrigo. After supposedly hearing of a murder threat against the Cleveland family hierarchy from Bonarrigo, Sinito went to Licavoli and Lonardo and informed them of the threat. Sinito was then given permission to contract for Bonarrigo's murder, which was given to Joe Iacobacci. Iacobacci used the help of a Hell's Angels member in the murder of Joe Bonarrigo. However, after finding out that Sinito was in the dope business with Zagaria, Lonardo assumed that Sinito wanted Bonarrigo out of the way for his dope business, and not because of any real threat to them.

David Perrier had been a collector of loanshark debts for Sinito. Perrier had a drug problem and would get drunk and get into fights at the local bars. Sinito had told Lonardo that he was worried about Perrier, as he thought Perrier had already talked to law enforcement about Sinito's illegal activities. One time, Perrier created a scene at a bar in Mayfield Heights, Ohio, when he made statements against Licavoli and slapped Licavoli's friend, Steve "Darby" Calcavecchio. Later, Perrier met Licavoli and got on his knees and begged Licavoli's forgiveness. Perrier continued his erratic behaviour.

Around 1981, Perrier was found shot to death. Suspecting that Perrier was talking to the feds, Sinito killed him. He and another mobster picked Perrier up and drove him to an area near Warren, Ohio. After repeatedly shooting Perrier four to five times in the head, Perrier didn't die and continued to struggle with them. According to Lonardo's testimony to the Committee on Governmental Affairs in 1988, Perrier told Sinito, "You son of a bitch. I thought we were brothers." Perrier lived for a short while, then died. They then dumped the body from the car. Sinito then disposed of the car by burning it, as it was soaked with blood.

=== Arrest and imprisonment ===
After Mafia boss James Licavoli was indicted for racketeering in connection with the murder of Danny Greene in 1982, Angelo Lonardo, took control of the Cleveland crime family. He led the family until 1984. During that year, Lonardo was convicted of running the Zagaria drug trafficking network, and was sentenced to life in prison. He then became an informant, making him the highest ranking Mafia turncoat up to that time. He informed on powerful Mafiosi from numerous families while in prison, and caused serious damage to the Cleveland family's infrastructure.

On October 16, 1981, Sinito was convicted of conspiring to conduct a racketeering activity, engaging in a racketeering activity, making extortionate extensions of credit, making collections of extensions of credit by extortionate means, attempting to evade income tax, and filing false and fraudulent income tax returns. The United States District Court for the Northern District of Ohio sentenced him to eighteen years imprisonment and a $20,000 fine. Sinito began serving his sentence at the Federal Correctional Institution in Ashland, Kentucky on November 19, 1981.

On July 2, 1986, Sinito pleaded guilty to charges of engaging in a continuing criminal enterprise, and possession with intent to distribute; cocaine. He was sentenced by the United States District Court for the Northern District of Ohio, to a term of imprisonment of twenty-two years, and a concurrent term of imprisonment of five years, with a special parole term of three years. This sentence was to run concurrently with the federal sentence Sinito had been serving. On July 17, 1986, Sinito plead guilty to voluntary manslaughter in connection with the 1981 execution murder of David Perrier, in Trumbull County. He received a sentence of seven to twenty-five years for manslaughter from an Ohio state court.

Even while incarcerated, Sinito remained a major influence in the Cleveland Mafia. Angelo Lonardo warned the FBI, that Sinito was one of the few made members who possessed the strong will and determination necessary to revive the Cleveland family after being released from prison. From prison, Sinito recommended two new members, Russell Papalardo and Joseph "Loose Lips" Iacobacci, Jr, be inducted into the Cleveland crime family in 1983.

He was seeking early release from the state parole board, when he died of a heart attack in the exercise yard, at the Belmont Correctional Institution near St. Clairsville, Ohio. He was 59 years old at the time of his death. During Sinito's funeral service, on December 23, 1997 at St. John's Cathedral, his former defense lawyer, James Willis summed up Sinito's life by calling him "courageous and honorable." Of Sinito, Willis said; "If he told you something you could take it to the bank. He wasn’t a cry baby.... He was from the old school." Sinito is buried in Knollwood Cemetery in Mayfield Heights, Ohio.
