= Ray Ferritto =

American mobster

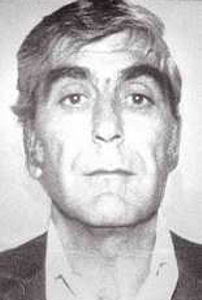
- Born: Remo Ferretti; April 8, 1929; Erie, Pennsylvania, U.S.
- Died: May 10, 2004 (aged 75); Sarasota, Florida, U.S.
- Spouse(s): Wilma Rose Tochluk (1947-1956; div.); Bernetta DelleCurti (1957-?); Susan DeSantis Ferritto (198?-his death)
- Children: 4

Raymond W. Ferritto (April 8, 1929 – May 10, 2004) was an American mobster from Erie, Pennsylvania. He served as an associate and hitman for the Cleveland and Los Angeles crime families. Ferritto is best known for assassinating rival mobster Danny Greene in Cleveland, Ohio, in 1977 in order to prevent Greene from overthrowing the Cleveland Mafia, and subsequently becoming a government witness when implicated in the killing.

== Early life ==
Raymond Ferritto was born Remo Ferretti on April 8, 1929, in Erie, Pennsylvania, to Michael and Rose (née Fracassi) Ferritto. He was the fourth of five children, and the second of three sons. Within a year of his birth, the family had changed its last name to Ferritto, and Remo began using the name Raymond when he began attending school.

As a child, Ferritto was rebellious and often fought with other children in the neighborhood. He attended Roosevelt Junior High school, where he befriended Armond "Peeps" Farranti and Tommy LaCastro. He and Farranti obtained employment at a local grocer, but soon began stealing his chickens to sell on the local black market. After being taunted about his knee breeches, he stole long dress pants from a local clothier. He was 13 years old when he and Farranti ran away from home and burglarized a closed gas station in Ashtabula, Ohio, but were caught by police a few hours later.

Ferritto obtained a job at Urick Foundry when he was 14 years old after lying about his age. He suffered severely broken toes in one foot after a work-accident, and his family filed a lawsuit. The suit was settled for $50 when the foundry discovered Ray had lied about his age.

A short time after his accident, Ferritto formed a gang called "The Wasps" with Farranti, LaCastro, and a few other local teenagers. For two years, the gang smashed vending machines at gas stations, movie theaters, and other businesses, looting them of their coins. They were caught after robbing a cigar store owned by Dominic A. "Dee" Adiutori, an associate of James "Westfield Jimmy" Salamone of the Buffalo crime family. (Note: In time, Dee Adiutori would himself become an associate of the Buffalo crime family. Salamone rose to become a made man and capo in the family. Dee Adiutori was convicted in January 1955 of running an illegal numbers racket and sentenced to one to 3-and-a-half years in prison. His sentence was commuted to time served by Pennsylvania Governor George M. Leader in November 1955. Adiutori was arrested for transporting illegal slot machines across state lines in 1983. He pleaded guilty.) A judge declined to sentence him after a local priest intervened on his behalf.

Ferritto was drafted into the United States Marine Corps about June 1946. His mangled foot was unable to take the stress of boot camp. He was transferred to the Casualty Company in July, and discharged in October.

== Criminal career ==
Ferritto was arrested, along with four other men, of attempting to rob a gas station in Erie, in August 1957. Ferritto pleaded guilty, and was sentenced to three to six years in state prison.

In Warren, Ferritto met Ronald "Ronnie the Crab" Carabbia and Anthony "Tony Dope" Delsanter. Carabbia and his three brothers were all known as "the Crab", which was a play on their last name, and had become prominent in the organized crime scene in Youngstown. Delsanter was a made man in the Cleveland crime family who managed the family's gambling interests in the Mahoning Valley.

In 1958, at age twenty-nine, Ferritto was arrested for burglary. He pleaded guilty and served three years of a three- to five-year sentence. Once out, Ferritto spent some time in the Cleveland area where he committed several burglaries with his childhood friends, Allie Calabrese and Pasquale "Butchie" Cisternino.

By the late 1960s, Ferritto had moved to Los Angeles where he was associated with a group of Cleveland mobsters, including Julius Petro. In the forties, Petro avoided a death sentence on a retrial in a murder case. Ferritto and Petro were associates of Jimmy Fratianno, who was closely associated with the Los Angeles crime family. Likewise, Ferritto was trying to make a name for himself. He never became an inducted, or "made", member of the Mafia, however.

In 1969, Ferritto booked a flight from Los Angeles to Erie. He was driven to the airport by another burglar, originally from Cleveland. Accompanying the two to the airport was gangster Julius Petro. The accomplice wheeled the car into an airport parking garage spot. Ferritto waited for a plane to take off, put a gun to the back of Julius Petro's head and fired a shot, killing him. The single fatal shot was muffled by the jet engines. The murder resulted from a conflict with a well-known and successful bookmaker in Los Angeles who used Petro as muscle. Ferritto and his accomplice were likely candidates for the contract since they both also disliked Petro. Fratianno confirmed the facts of Petro's murder after Fratianno became a government witness in 1977.

Prior to the murder hit at the airport, Ferritto tried to plant a bomb in Petro's car. While assembling the explosive, Ferritto accidentally detonated the blasting cap, causing a minor injury to his leg. He opted for the "one-way ride" method of execution next. Petro's killing went unsolved for years until a dramatic turn of events began to unfold.

In 1971, Ferritto was convicted of burglary, this time with explosives. He was sentenced to fifteen years and incarcerated at the California Institution for Men in Chino, California. Fratianno also was doing prison time at Chino and the two became friends. In 1974, Ferritto was released from Chino, and returned to Erie. He started booking again and also worked for a vending company that was owned by a cousin. By that time, Ferritto developed a peptic ulcer serious enough to require partial removal of his stomach. To calm his nerves, he took handfuls of antacid tablets and even smoked marijuana.

In the 1970s, Danny Greene began competing with the Cleveland crime family for control of union rackets, resulting in a violent mob war. During this period, there were almost 40 car bombings in Cleveland and eight failed attempts to kill Greene. Finally, Cleveland family bosses James "Jack White" Licavoli and Angelo "Big Ange" Lonardo contracted Ferritto to assassinate Greene.

While staking out Greene before killing him, Ferritto identified his target from a photo in the April 1977 issue of Cleveland Magazine. On October 6, 1977, Greene was at his dentist's office. Ferritto and Ronald Carabbia parked a car containing a bomb in the side door, next to Greene's car. When Greene started entering his car, Carabbia detonated the bomb and killed Greene instantly.

The two witnesses to the murder scene were Greg and Debbie Spoth. Debbie Spoth, the daughter of a Berea policeman, was a sketch artist who drew an amazing likeness of Ray Ferritto for authorities. She took the sketch to her father, who in turn, took it to Andy Vanyo, head of the Cleveland police intelligence unit, who identified Ferritto from a police file. Debbie was also able to write down the license plate of the get away car down. This led to the police looking into the registration on the cars.

When a search warrant was executed at Ferritto's house in Erie, police found the registration papers for the bomb car and getaway car tying Ferritto to the murder of Danny Greene. The police arrested Ferrito after finding the registrations. The search of Ferritto's house also turned up a copy of Cleveland Magazine with a picture of Greene in it. Upon hearing of Ferritto's arrest, Licavoli put out a hit contract on Ferritto. When Ferritto learned that the Cleveland family wanted him dead, he became a government witness and testified against his co-defendants in the 1978 trial. The State of Ohio indicted Licavoli, Lonardo, Ferritto, Carabbia and 15 other members of the Cleveland family for the Greene murder.

Ferritto also admitted responsibility for the 1969 killing of Cleveland gangster Julius Anthony Petro. He served less than four years in prison for both murders. Ray Ferritto left the witness protection program after one year and continued to stay in Pennsylvania.

January 1983, Ferritto and Maggadino member Anthony D. Ciotto found Frank "Bolo" Dovishaw, rackets figure, dead of a gangland execution at Dovishaw's home.

In 1992, Ferritto was convicted of criminal conspiracy and bookmaking charges. He was sentenced from six to 23-and-a-half months' imprisonment, three years on probation, and fined $10,500.

== Post-prison life and death ==
Ferritto died of congestive heart failure in Sarasota, Florida, on May 10, 2004, at the age 75.

== Personal life ==
Ferrito married Wilma Rose Tochluk on August 10, 1947. The couple had three children, and divorced in 1956. He married Bernetta DelleCurti in September 1957, and they had one child.

== In popular culture ==
In the 2011 film Kill the Irishman, Ferritto was portrayed onscreen by actor Robert Davi.

== Bibliography ==
- Ferritto, Susan (2012). Ferritto: An Assassin Scorned. Erie, Pa.: Ragpaper Press. ISBN 9780578108292.
- Pennsylvania Crime Commission (1984). Pennsylvania Crime Commission 1984 Report. Linglestown, Pa.: Pennsylvania Crime Commission. ISBN 0818200006. OCLC 4769338744.
- Pennsylvania Crime Commission (1990). Organized Crime in Pennsylvania: A Decade of Change: 1990 Report. St. Davids, Pa.: Pennsylvania Crime Commission. OCLC 222415543.
- Pennsylvania Crime Commission (1992). Pennsylvania Crime Commission 1992 Report. St. Davids, Pa.: Office of the Attorney General, Commonwealth of Pennsylvania. OCLC 1787071.
- Porrello, Rick (2011). To Kill the Irishman: The War that Crippled the Mafia. New York: Pocket Books. ISBN 9781439171752.
