= National Criminal Justice Reference Service =

US government program

The National Criminal Justice Reference Service (NCJRS) is a federally sponsored program that shares publications and other information including grants and funding opportunities and upcoming trainings and conferences from the United States Department of Justice's Office of Justice Programs (OJP) agencies and National Institute of Corrections (NIC). NCJRS also maintains a criminal justice library and serves as a resource for law enforcement and other criminal justice agencies.

NCJRS services and resources are available to anyone interested in crime, victim assistance, and public safety including policymakers, practitioners, researchers, educators, community leaders, and the general public. NCJRS hosts one of the largest criminal and juvenile justice libraries and databases in the world, the NCJRS Abstracts Database.

It publishes reports on such matters as the use of body cameras by police, the relatively high placement of ethnic minorities in detention facilities, online safety and the sexual exploitation of children, and human trafficking.

== See also ==
- List of academic databases and search engines
