= Anthony Milano =

American mobster

- Born: December 5, 1888; Reggio Calabria, Italy
- Died: August 5, 1978 (aged 89); Cleveland, Ohio, U.S.
- Other names: Tony, Old Man
- Known for: Mafia activity

Anthony Milano (December 5, 1888 – August 5, 1978) was an American mobster who rose to power working for the Cleveland crime family in the American Mafia. He served as the longtime underboss in the Cleveland crime family from 1930 until his retirement in 1976. He was the godfather of future Cleveland crime family underboss Angelo Lonardo. Anthony Milano founded the Italian American Brotherhood Club in 1928 in Cleveland’s Murray Hill neighborhood. The Club still exists today.

Milano was born on December 5, 1888, in Reggio Calabria in Southern Italy to Pietro and Grazia Milano (née Mazza). His family eventually immigrated to the United States and made their way to Cleveland, Ohio. Milano and his brother Frank were active in Black Hand extortion and bootlegging during prohibition. His younger brother Frank was leader of the "Mayfield Road Mob", an Italian gang that fought the Porrello crime family for control of criminal rackets in Ohio. In the early 1930s, the Porrello family was defeated and Frank became boss of the Cleveland crime family, being an original member of The Commission. Anthony served as his underboss. In 1935, Frank fled the country due to tax evasion charges. Alfred Polizzi took over as boss of the family and kept Anthony on as underboss. Milano remained underboss for decades despite the changes in leadership over the years.

Milano had significant control over several local labor unions in Cleveland due to his connection to Jackie Presser. As the years went on, Milano spent less time involved in the Cleveland crime family and he began to take on more of an advisory role while other influential crime family members served as acting underbosses. Even so, he kept the title of underboss until his retirement in 1976.

Milano became a naturalized citizen on June 27, 1924. He married Josephine DiSanto and had four sons: Peter, Frank, John and Carmen. His wife and kids moved to Los Angeles in the 1940s while he split time between Los Angeles, Cleveland and Las Vegas. Milano had many legitimate and criminal business interests in all three cities. His eldest son Peter was a member of the Los Angeles crime family and the Milanos' relationship strengthened the ties between the two crime families. His niece's husband John Nardi, an influential associate of the Cleveland crime family, went against the Cleveland family in the 1970s and sided with the Irish gang led by Danny Greene.

He died of natural causes on August 5, 1978, at Lakeside Hospital in Cleveland. He was buried at All Souls Cemetery in Chardon, Ohio.
