= Cuyahoga County Sheriff's Office =

- Cuyahoga County Sheriff Logo

- Sheriff's badge
- Abbreviation: CCSO

Jurisdictional structure
- Jurisdiction of Cuyahoga County Sheriff’s Department
- Area: 1,246 sq mi (3,230 km2)
- Population: 1,264,817
- Legal jurisdiction: Cuyahoga County
- Governing body: Government of Cuyahoga County
- General nature: Local civilian police

Operational structure
- Headquarters: Justice Center Complex Cleveland, Ohio
- Agency executive: Harold Pretel, Sheriff

Facilities
- Jails: 2

Website
- cuyahogacounty.us/sheriff

The Cuyahoga County Sheriff's Office is the primary law enforcement agency for Cuyahoga County, Ohio. The office provides the county with correctional, civil, and law enforcement services. It is the only Ohio county with an appointed sheriff rather than an elected one.

== History ==
In 1810, Smith Balwin was elected as the first sheriff.

In 1982, press reports indicated indiscipline in the county jail. Organized crime figures were being given special privileges they used to continue their rackets from behind bars.

In 1997, the New York Times reported the FBI claimed a guard at the jail was selling drugs and claimed to be part of a ring of several dozen local officers who protected local drug dealers.

In May 2009, Sheriff Gerald McFaul Sr. resigned in a scandal after press reports that he was accepting cash payments from employees for promotions and other favors. McFaul was later convicted on corruption charges. Due to this scandal, the position of sheriff was made one that county officials appoint. McFaul was replaced by Bob Reid, who was chief of police in Bedford, Ohio. Reid was asked to resign in January 2013.

In 2015, the office established a Use of Deadly Force Investigation Unit to provide a standard, comprehensive, neutral investigative response to use of deadly force incidents. The unit, composed of specially-trained detectives, acts as an independent investigative unit that, when requested, investigates and reviews police use of deadly force incidents for requesting law enforcement entities. In 2015, the UDF team investigated six incidents.

In 2018, eight inmates died while in the county jail, culminating in the resignation of the head of the jail. In 2019, his successor, Eric Ivey, was indicted on charges of tampering with evidence to hide problems at the facility. In April 2019, five jailers were taken into custody by their own department on charges of turning off cameras, restraining and beating people, and other misconduct.

In July 2023, Harold Pretel, who had been Deputy Chief for the Cleveland Division of Police, was approved as Sheriff by the Cuyahoga County Council after being appointed by County Executive Chris Ronayne.

== Gallery ==
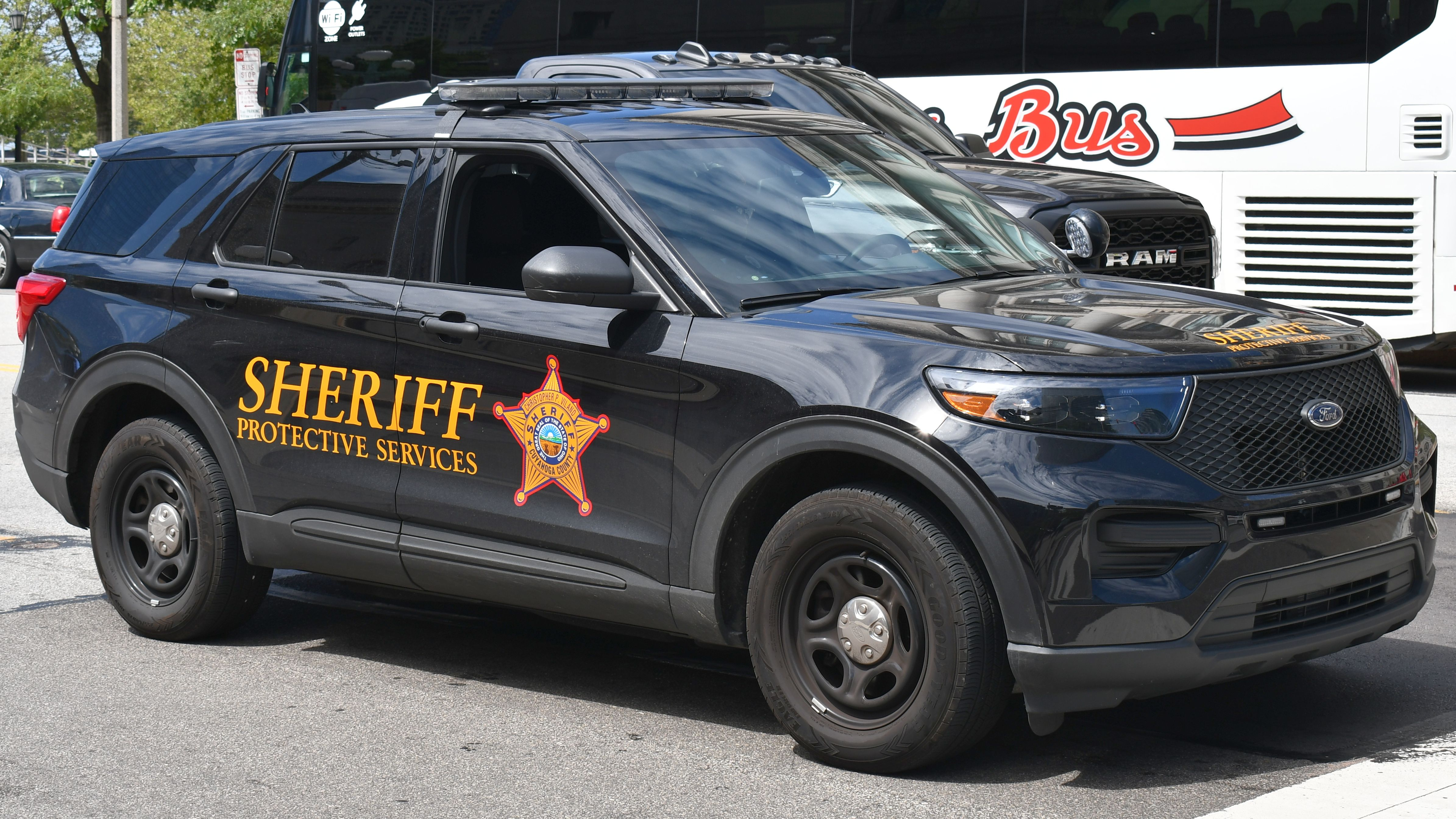
Cuyahoga County Sheriff Protective Services Division Ford Police Interceptor Utility

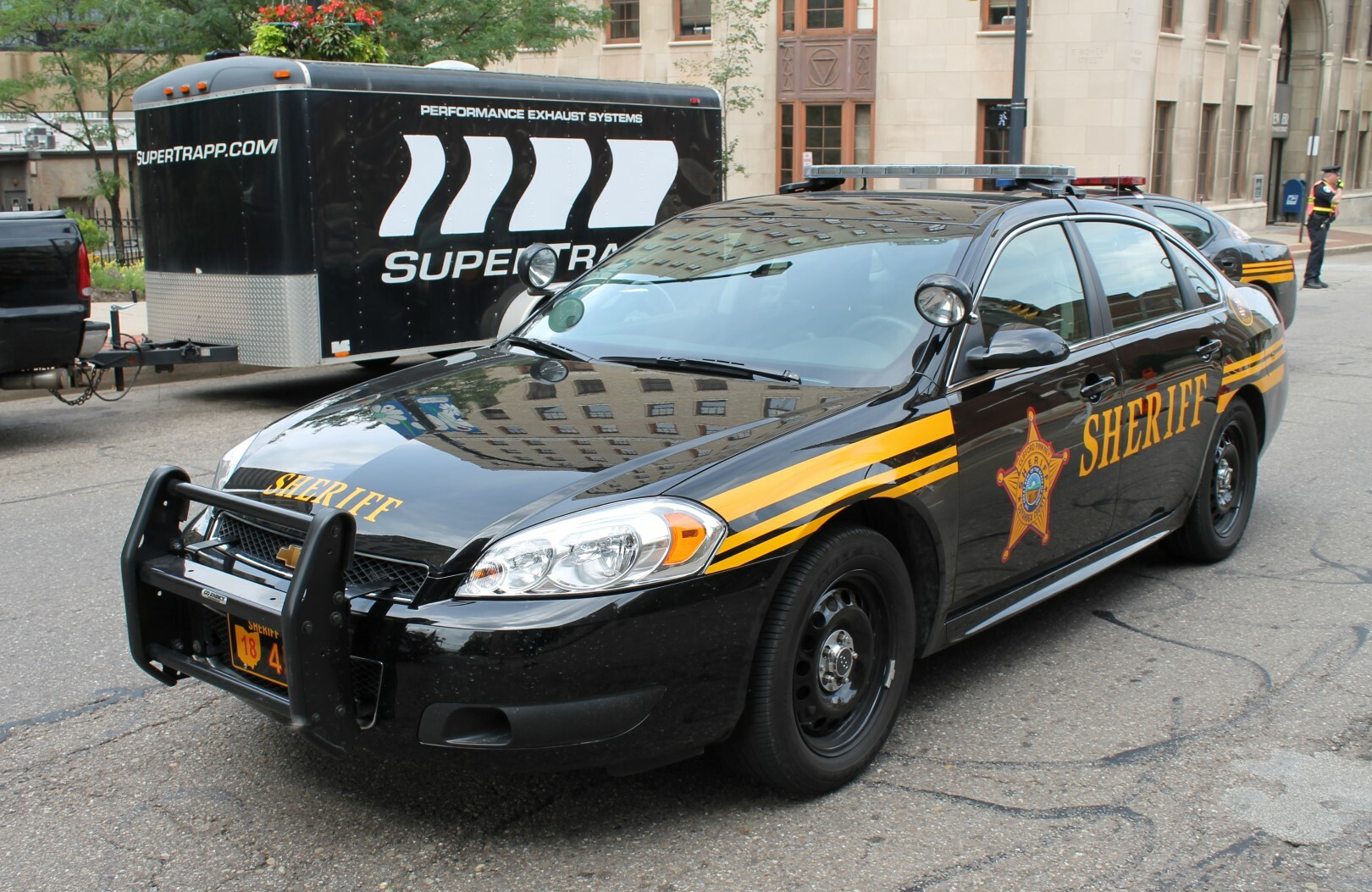
Cuyahoga County Sheriff Chevy Impala

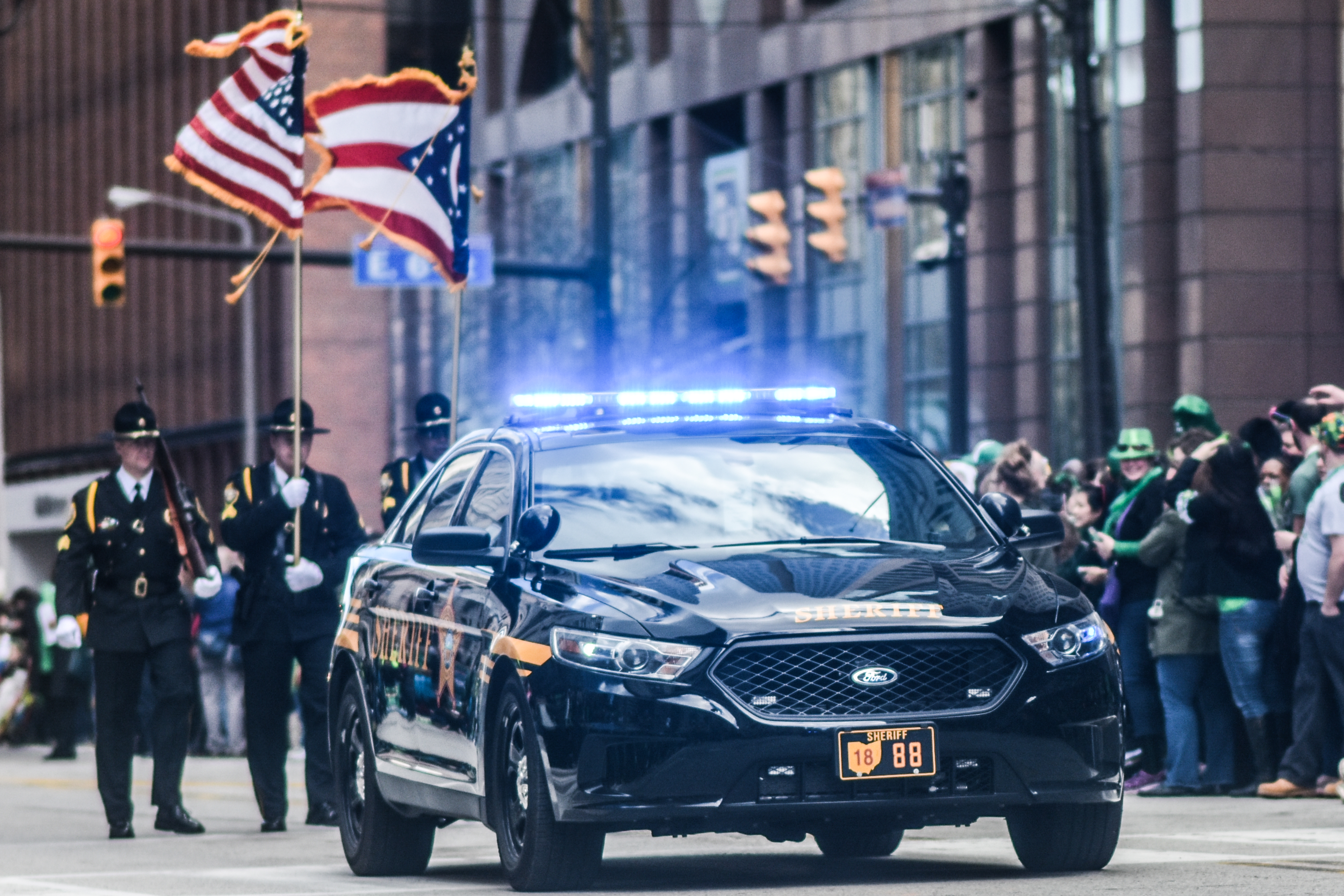
Sheriff cruiser at Cleveland St. Patrick’s Day Parade with CCSD Honor Guard behind
