= John T. Scalish =

American mobster (1912–1976)

- Scalish in the early 1970s
- Born: September 18, 1912; Cleveland, Ohio, U.S.
- Died: May 26, 1976 (aged 63); Cleveland, Ohio, U.S.
- Resting place: Calvary Cemetery, Cleveland, Ohio, U.S.
- Occupations: Gangster; racketeer
- Known for: Boss of the Cleveland Mafia
- Predecessor: Alfred Polizzi
- Successor: James T. Licavoli
- Allegiance: Cleveland Mafia

John T. Scalish (September 18, 1912 – May 26, 1976), also known as "John Scalise", was an American mobster who became the boss of the Cleveland crime family. His death resulted in the ascension of James T. Licavoli to the head of the Cleveland Mob and to a bloody gang war that would essentially destroy the once-powerful crime family that Scalish had helped to develop.

== Biography ==
Born in 1912, Scalish was the brother-in-law of Cleveland crime family boss Angelo Lonardo and Cleveland mob associate Milton Rockman.

In 1944, Scalish succeeded Alfred Polizzi as head of the Cleveland family upon his retirement to Florida. Scalish would remain boss for the next 32 years. Scalish attended the infamous Apalachin Meeting in 1957 in Upstate New York. During Scalish's tenure as the boss, the Cleveland family lived up to its golden years.

Scalish was involved in casino skimming in Las Vegas, Nevada, shaking down casinos such as the Stardust and Desert Inn along with other crime bosses from across the United States. Scalish oversaw the Cleveland family's aggressive move into Las Vegas and California, with Moe Dalitz taking over the failing Desert Inn from Bugsy Siegel.

Dalitz also led the development of other casinos, a major hospital, and other Las Vegas projects, many of which were financed by the mob-controlled Teamsters union. Scalish was a very powerful and respected mob boss and commanded underlings who controlled gambling, loansharking, and large-scale union corruption. His rap sheet dated back to 1930 and included arrests for burglary and robbery.

Scalish was also a powerful labor racketeer in Cleveland. During Scalish's reign as boss, Cleveland mobsters had much control over the Teamsters Union. By the 1950s, the Cleveland Mob reached its peak, with 60 made members, and many more associates, according to the FBI. By the 1970s, however, the family's membership began to decrease, because Scalish didn't induct many new members.

Scalish brought the Cleveland crime family a lengthy period of stability and maintained violence at a minimum, concentrating more on expanding the family's influence and fortunes than gaining a reputation for fear and unnecessary violence. He forged ties between Italian and Jewish underworld forces during his reign to make substantial amounts of illicit money.

He also knew many prominent local politicians and judges on a first-name basis, which helped the crime family to stay under the radar for many years. Scalish once sat in on The Commission, the governing body in charge of allocating territories and settling disputes among Mafia families across the nation. Scalish was the boss of the Cleveland mob for 32 years, by far the longest-reigning boss in the history of the Cleveland family. During his time as the crime family's leader, the group also developed ties with important crime figures like Shondor Birns, Meyer Lansky, and Tony Accardo. The family also became allies of the extremely powerful Chicago Outfit and Genovese crime family.

On May 26, 1976, John Scalish died during heart surgery at Lakeside Hospital in Cleveland. He was buried at Calvary Cemetery in Cleveland.

A full-scale gang war for control of the Cleveland rackets broke out after his death between James T. Licavoli, Scalish's successor, and Irish mob boss Danny Greene.

Business positions
Preceded by Alfred Polizzi	Cleveland crime family Boss; 1945-1976	Succeeded by James Licavoli
