= Angelo Lonardo =

American mobster (1911-2006)

- Lonardo's 1977 police mugshot
- Born: Angelo Anthony Lonardo; January 21, 1911; Cleveland, Ohio, U.S.
- Died: March 31, 2006 (aged 95); Cleveland, Ohio, U.S.
- Other name: "Big Ange"
- Occupation: Crime boss
- Allegiance: Cleveland crime family

Angelo Anthony Lonardo (January 21, 1911 − March 31, 2006) was an American mobster who became the acting boss of the Cleveland crime family in the early 1980s.

== Criminal career ==
Lonardo was born in Cleveland in 1911 to Joseph and Concetta Lonardo. His godfather was Anthony Milano. The Lonardo family had immigrated to the United States from Licata in Sicily in the early 20th century and settled in the Woodland district of Cleveland.

During the Prohibition era, Lonardo's father and uncles were involved in a gang war with the Porrello brothers over control of sugar distribution to regional bootleggers. After his father was murdered by a member of the Porrello crime family on October 13, 1927, 16-year-old Lonardo swore revenge. On June 11, 1929, the 18-year-old Lonardo and his cousin, Dominic Sospirato, shot and killed Salvatore "Black Sam" Todaro at a cigar store owned by the Porrellos at the corner of East 110th Street and Woodland Avenue. After several months in hiding in California, where he was harbored by his uncle Dominick Lonardo, Angelo Lonardo and his cousin were arrested and charged over the murder of Todaro. Lonardo and Sospirato were convicted of murder and sentenced to life in prison. However, after serving a year and a half of their sentence, the pair were granted a second trial in which they were acquitted in December 1931. Angelo Lonardo and several other former members of the Lonardo gang subsequently became affiliated with Frank Milano's Mayfield Road Mob, which was based in Cleveland's Little Italy and affiliated with the Syndicate, a Jewish mob group headed by Moe Dalitz. In February 1932, Lonardo was questioned by police over the murders of Raymond and Rosario Porello and one of their underlings, Dominic Gueli, who had also been shot dead in a cigar store.

In 1933, Lonardo and another cousin, John DeMarco, killed Dr. Joseph Romano, a former Cleveland mob boss, because he believed that Romano had been involved in the murder of his father. DeMarco, a "made" member of the Mafia, was sentenced to death by his superiors because he had violated Cosa Nostra rules by killing a boss without the permission of The Commission, while Lonardo was vindicated because he was not a member of the Mafia. Lonardo later accompanied Alfred Polizzi, the boss of the Cleveland Mafia, to Miami, where Polizzi defended DeMarco's actions before other Commission members and was able to have DeMarco's death sentence rescinded. In June 1939, Lonardo was one of nine mobsters indicted for running a numbers racket.

Lonardo was inducted as a "made member" of the Cleveland crime family during the late 1940s when John Scalish, Lonardo's brother-in-law, was boss of the family. As a family soldier, Lonardo was designated with collecting protection money from casinos in Northern Kentucky and Western Pennsylvania, and he eventually worked his way up to underboss in 1976.

Lonardo was convicted in 1983 of multiple racketeering and drug trafficking charges and sentenced to serve a life sentence plus 103 years at Lewisburg Federal Penitentiary. After his first judicial appeal was denied, Lonardo contacted the FBI and offered to become a government witness. He testified against his former colleagues and several mob figures throughout the United States. Lonardo and Jimmy Fratianno, the acting boss of the Los Angeles crime family, were the highest-ranking mobsters to become federal witnesses until Gambino underboss Sammy "the Bull" Gravano during the early 1990s. He eventually went into the federal witness protection program, but left it to return to Cleveland.

== Death ==
Lonardo died in his sleep on March 31, 2006, aged 95. He was buried in Calvary Cemetery in Cleveland.
