= List of Western films of the 2000s =

A list of Western films released in the 2000s.

Title	Director	Cast	Country	Subgenre/notes
2000
Across the Line	Martin Spottl	Brad Johnson, Sigal Erez, Adrienne Barbeau, Brian Bloom	United States	Contemporary Western
All the Pretty Horses	Billy Bob Thornton	Matt Damon, Henry Thomas, Lucas Black, Penélope Cruz, Ruben Blades, Robert Patrick, Julio Oscar Mechoso, Míriam Colón, Bruce Dern, Sam Shepard, Lonnie Rodriguez, J.D. Garfield, Jo Harvey Allen, Julio C. Cedillo	United States	Romance Western
The Claim	Michael Winterbottom	Peter Mullan, Milla Jovovich, Wes Bentley, Nastassja Kinski, Sarah Polley, Julian Richings, Shirley Henderson, Sean McGinley, Tom McCamus, Karolina Muller, Barry Ward, Duncan Frasier	United Kingdom; Canada	Romance Western
From Dusk till Dawn 3: The Hangman's Daughter	P.J. Pesce	Ara Celi, Marco Leonardi, Michael Parks	United States	Horror Western
Grey Owl	Richard Attenborough	Pierce Brosnan, Annie Galipeau, Nathaniel Arcand, Vlasta Vrána, David Fox, Charles Powell, Stephanie Cole, Renée Asherson, Stewart Bick, Graham Greene, Saginaw Grant	United Kingdom; Canada	Revisionist Western
High Noon	Rod Hardy	Tom Skerritt, Susanna Thompson, Reed Diamond, Maria Conchita Alonso, Dennis Weaver, Michael Madsen	United States	Outlaw Western
Shanghai Noon	Tom Dey	Jackie Chan, Owen Wilson, Lucy Liu, Brandon Merrill, Xander Berkeley, Roger Yuan, Kate Luyben, Jason Connery, Simon R. Baker, Walton Goggins, Henry O, Yu Rongguang, Eric Chen, Yuen Biao, Garvin Cross	United States	Comedy Western
South of Heaven, West of Hell	Dwight Yoakam	Dwight Yoakam, Vince Vaughn, Billy Bob Thornton, Bridget Fonda, Peter Fonda, Paul Reubens, Bud Cort, Michael Jeter, Bo Hopkins, Luke Askew, Joe Ely	United States	Revisionist Western
Tears of the Black Tiger	Wisit Sasanatieng	Chartchai Ngamsan, Stella Malucchi, Supakorn Kitsuwon	Thailand	
The Virginian	Bill Pullman	Bill Pullman, Diane Lane, John Savage, Harris Yulin, Colm Feore, James Drury, Gary Farmer, William MacDonald, Brent Stait, Sheila Moore, Philip Granger, Dennis Weaver, Dawn Greehalgh, Mark Anderako	United States	Traditional Western
2001
The American Astronaut	Cory McAbee	Rocco Sisto, Annie Golden	United States	Space Western
American Outlaws	Les Mayfield	Colin Farrell, Scott Caan, Ali Larter, Gabriel Macht, Gregory Smith, Harris Yulin, Will McCormack, Kathy Bates, Timothy Dalton, Ronny Cox, Terry O'Quinn, Ty O'Neal	United States	Outlaw Western
The Ballad of Lucy Whipple	Jeremy Kagan	Glenn Close, Jena Malone, Bruce McGill	United States	
Cowboy Up	Xavier Koller	Kiefer Sutherland, Marcus Thomas, Daryl Hannah, Melinda Dillon, Molly Ringwald, Russell Means, Anthony Lucero, Bo Hopkins	United States	Contemporary Western
Crossfire Trail	Simon Wincer	Tom Selleck, Virginia Madsen, Wilford Brimley, David O'Hara, Christian Kane, Mark Harmon, Brad Johnson, Barry Corbin, Ken Pogue, Joanna Miles, Patrick Kilpatrick, Rex Linn, William Sanderson	United States	Traditional Western
Dust	Milčo Mančevski	Joseph Fiennes, David Wenham, Adrian Lester, Rosemary Murphy, Vera Farmiga, Anne Brochet, Nikolina Kujaca, Vlado Jovanovski, Josif Josifovski, Matt Ross, Salaetin Bilal	United Kingdom; Macedonia	Hybrid Western
Jericho	Merlin Miller	Mark Valley, Leon Coffee, R. Lee Ermey, Lisa Stewart, Mark Collie, Morgana Shaw, Buck Taylor	United States	Mystery Western
The Journeyman	James Crowley	Brad Hunt, Daniel Plaine	United States	
Der Schuh des Manitu	Michael Herbig	Michael Herbig, Christian Tramitz, Sky du Mont	Germany	Comedy Western
Texas Rangers	Steve Miner	James Van Der Beek, Rachael Leigh Cook, Ashton Kutcher, Dylan McDermott, Usher Raymond, Tom Skerritt, Alfred Molina, Randy Travis, Robert Patrick, James Coburn	United States	Revisionist Western
Warden of Red Rock	Stephen Gyllenhaal	James Caan, David Carradine, Rachel Ticotin, Brian Dennehy, Billy Rieck, Gisela Sanchez, Lloyd Lowe, Kirk Baltz, Jim Beaver, Sergio Calderón, Gregory Norman Cruz, Michael Cavanaugh, Mark Metcalf, Michael Harney	United States	Outlaw Western
2002
800 Bullets	Álex de la Iglesia	Sancho Gracia, Carmen Maura	Spain	Comedy Western
Black Marshal: The Hunt for Dozier	Lee Newton	Mark Barragar, Phillip Borghee	United States	
Johnson County War	David S. Cass, Sr.	Tom Berenger, Luke Perry, Rachel Ward, Burt Reynolds, Michelle Forbes, Fay Masterson, Blu Mankuma, Jimmy Herman	Germany; United States	Traditional Western
King of Texas	Uli Edel	Patrick Stewart, Marcia Gay Harden, Lauren Holly, Roy Scheider, David Alan Grier, Colm Meaney, Patrick Bergin, Matt Letscher, Steven Bauer	United States	Traditional Western
The Legend of Jake Kincaid	Alan Autry	Alan Autry, David Hart	United States	Traditional Western
Legend of the Phantom Rider	Alex Erkiletian	Denise Crosby, Robert McRay	United States	Fantasy Western
Mi Amigo	Milton Brown	Josh Holloway, Burton Gilliam, Ed Bruce	United States	Comedy Western
The Outsider	Randa Haines	Tim Daly, Naomi Watts, Keith Carradine, David Carradine, Thomas Curtis, John Noble, Brett Tucker, Grant Piro, Peter McCauley, Jason Clarke	United States	
Spirit: Stallion of the Cimarron	Kelly Asbury, Lorna Cook	Matt Damon (voice), James Cromwell (voice), Daniel Studi (voice)	United States	Animated Western
The Wooden Gun	Jon Jacobs, Michael Kastenbaum	Jon Jacobs, Dawn Kapatos	United States	Outlaw Western
2003
And Starring Pancho Villa as Himself	Bruce Beresford	Antonio Banderas, Alan Arkin, Jim Broadbent, Kyle Chandler, Pedro Armendáriz, Jr.	United States	
Gang of Roses	Jean-Claude La Marre	Monica Calhoun, Stacey Dash, LisaRaye	United States	Revisionist Western
The Last Cowboy	Kelly Connell	Eugene Osment, Lance Henriksen	United States	Contemporary Western
The Last Samurai	Edward Zwick	Tom Cruise, Ken Watanabe, William Atherton, Tony Goldwyn, Scott Wilson	United States	Samurai Western
The Missing	Ron Howard	Cate Blanchett, Tommy Lee Jones, Evan Rachel Wood, Aaron Eckhart, Val Kilmer, Eric Schweig, Elisabeth Moss, Steve Reevis, Clint Howard	United States	Revisionist Western
Monte Walsh	Simon Wincer	Tom Selleck, Isabella Rossellini, Keith Carradine, Robert Carradine, Barry Corbin, James Gammon, William Sanderson, Wallace Shawn	United States	Traditional Western
Nate and the Colonel	Paul Winters	Paul Winters, Ricco Ross	United States	Traditional Western
Ned Kelly	Gregor Jordan	Heath Ledger, Orlando Bloom, Naomi Watts, Geoffrey Rush	Australia; United Kingdom; United States; France	Traditional Western
Once Upon a Time in Mexico	Robert Rodriguez	Antonio Banderas, Salma Hayek, Johnny Depp, Mickey Rourke, Eva Mendes, Danny Trejo, Cheech Marin, Willem Dafoe, Rubén Blades, Julio Oscar Mechoso	United States	Contemporary Western
Open Range	Kevin Costner	Robert Duvall, Kevin Costner, Annette Bening, Michael Gambon, Michael Jeter, Diego Luna, James Russo, Abraham Benrubi, Dean McDermott, Kim Coates, Herbert Kohler Jr., Peter MacNeill, Julian Richings, Ian Tracey, Rod Wilson	United States	Traditional Western
True Legends of the West	Billy McNally	Christopher Atkins, Nancy Criss	United States	Comedy Western
Turquoise	GiGi Mullins	Laci Alexander, Stephen Savage	United States	Romance Western
2004
The Alamo	John Lee Hancock	Dennis Quaid, Billy Bob Thornton, Jason Patric, Patrick Wilson, Emilio Echevarría, Jordi Mollà, Leon Rippy, Tom Davidson, Marc Blucas, Robert Prentiss, Kevin Page, Stephen Bruton, Laura Clifton, Ricardo Chavira, Emily Deschanel, Brandon Smith, W. Earl Brown, Tom Everett, Rance Howard, Stewart Finlay-McLennan, Castulo Guerra, Francisco Philbert, Flavio Hinojosa, Michael Crabtree, Rutherford Cravens, Dameon Clarke	United States	Traditional Western
Blueberry	Jan Kounen	Vincent Cassel, Juliette Lewis, Michael Madsen, Temuera Morrison, Ernest Borgnine, Djimon Hounsou, Hugh O'Conor, Geoffrey Lewis, Nichole Hiltz, Kateri Walker, Vahina Giocante, Kestenbetsa, Tchéky Karyo, Eddie Izzard, Colm Meaney	Mexico; France; United Kingdom	Hybrid Western
Dead Birds	Alex Turner	Henry Thomas, Patrick Fugit	United States	Horror Western
Ghost Rock	Dustin Rikert	Gary Busey, Michael Worth, Jeff Fahey, Adrienne Barbeau	United States	Revenge Western
Hidalgo	Joe Johnston	Viggo Mortensen, Omar Sharif, Saïd Taghmaoui	United States	Traditional Western
Home on the Range	Will Finn, John Sanford	Roseanne Barr, Judi Dench, Jennifer Tilly, Cuba Gooding, Jr., Randy Quaid	United States	Comedy Western, animated film
Lucky Luke and the Daltons (Les Daltons)	Philippe Haïm	Eric Judor, Til Schweiger, Ramzy Bedia	France; Germany; Spain	Comedy Western
Pizza, Pesos and Pistoleros	Andrew Wiest	Robert Bear, Lillith Fields	United States	Comedy Western
The Trail to Hope Rose	David S. Cass sr.	Lou Diamond Phillips, Ernest Borgnine, Lee Majors, Richard Tyson, Marina Black, Warren Stevens, Jonathan Murphy, David Shackelford, Casey Sander, Paul Hewitt, Buck Taylor, Tracey Walter, Tom Everett, Jenny Sullivan	United States	Traditional Western
Tremors 4: The Legend Begins	S.S. Wilson	Michael Gross	United States	Horror Western
2005
Brokeback Mountain	Ang Lee	Heath Ledger, Jake Gyllenhaal, Randy Quaid, Michelle Williams, Anne Hathaway, Linda Cardellini, Anna Faris, David Harbour, Roberta Maxwell, Peter McRobbie, Kate Mara, Scott Michael Campbell, Graham Beckel	United States	Romance Western
Brothers in Arms	Jean-Claude La Marre	David Carradine	United States	
Buckaroo: The Movie	James A. Brooks	Simon Baker, James A. Brooks, Gary Busey	United States	Family Western
Don't Come Knocking	Wim Wenders	Sam Shepard, Jessica Lange, Tim Roth, Gabriel Mann, Sarah Polley, Fairuza Balk, Eva Marie Saint, George Kennedy, Tim Matheson, Julia Sweeney, Marley Shelton, Rodney A. Grant	United States	Road movie
Down in the Valley	David Jacobson	Edward Norton, Evan Rachel Wood, David Morse, Rory Culkin, Bruce Dern, John Diehl, Geoffrey Lewis, Artel Kayàru, Elizabeth Peña, Kat Dennings, Hunter Parrish, Aviva Farber, Terrence Evans	United States	Contemporary Western
Hell to Pay	Chris McIntyre	Peter Brown, Katie A. Keane, James Drury, Stella Stevens, Lee Majors, Bo Svenson, Buck Taylor, William Smith	United States	Traditional Western
The Legend of Zorro	Martin Campbell	Antonio Banderas, Catherine Zeta-Jones, Adrián Alonso, Rufus Sewell, Nick Chinlund, Julio Oscar Mechoso, Leo Burmester, Tony Amendola, Pedro Armendáriz, Jr., Michael Emerson	United States	
Miracle at Sage Creek	James Intveld	David Carradine, Wes Studi, Irene Bedard, Buck Taylor, Michael Parks, Tracy Nelson, Tim Abell, Sarah Aldrich, Daniel Quinn, Rance Howard	United States	
Planetfall	Michael J. Heagle	Jonathan Adams	United States	Sci-fi Western
The Proposition	John Hillcoat	Guy Pearce, Ray Winstone, Emily Watson, Danny Huston, David Wenham, Richard Wilson, John Hurt, Tom E. Lewis, Leah Purcell, Tom Budge, Robert Morgan, David Gulpilil, Noah Taylor, Oliver Ackland, Ralph Cotterill	Australia; United Kingdom	Outback Western
Ride or Die	Chris W. Hill	Sarah Kozer, Jesse Wells Martins, Kira Madallo Sesay	United States	
River's End	William Katt	Barry Corbin, Sam Huntington, Caroline Goodall, William Katt, Charles Durning, Clint Howard, Amanda Brooks	United States	
Serenity	Joss Whedon	Nathan Fillion, Gina Torres, Alan Tudyk, Morena Baccarin	United States	Space Western, hybrid Western
Showdown at Devil's Butte	Rick Simpson	Geoff Baron, Charlie Ward, Rick Simpson	United States	Traditional Western
The Shunned	C.M. Downs	Kurt Hanover, Adam Gaitan	United States	Horror Western
The Tailor	Alveraz Ricardez	Casey Austin, Jon Equis, Joe Estevez	United States	
Three Bad Men	Jeff Hathcock	Mike Moroff, Chris Gann, George Kennedy	United States	
The Three Burials of Melquiades Estrada	Tommy Lee Jones	Tommy Lee Jones, Barry Pepper, Julio César Cedillo, Dwight Yoakam, January Jones, Melissa Leo, Richard Andrew Jones, Vanessa Bauche, Levon Helm, Mel Rodriguez, Cecilia Suárez, Ignacio Guadalupe	France; United States	Contemporary Western
Truce	Matthew Marconi	Buck Taylor, Samantha Droke	United States	Contemporary Western
Whiskey Jacks	Tyler MacIntyre	Col Cseke, Shaun Cordingley	United States	Traditional Western
2006
After Sundown	Michael W. Brown	Susana Gibb, Christopher Abram	United States	Horror Western
Bandidas	Espen Sandberg, Joachim Roenning	Salma Hayek, Penélope Cruz, Steve Zahn, Dwight Yoakam, Denis Arndt, Jose Maria Negri, Audra Blaser, Sam Shepard, Ismael 'East' Carlo, Edgar Vivar	Mexico; United States; France	Comedy Western
Broken Trail	Walter Hill	Robert Duvall, Thomas Haden Church, Greta Scacchi	United States	Revisionist Western
The Decoy	Justin Kreinbrink	Clint James, Amos Carver	United States	Traditional Western
Desolation Canyon	David S. Cass, Sr.	Stacy Keach, Patrick Duffy, Kenneth Johnson, Yvonne DeLaRosa, Kelly Overton, David Rees Snell, Courtney Gains, Victor Browne, A Martinez, Cubbie Kile, Michael Patrick McGill, Franc Ross, Drake Johnston, Tom Kiesche	United States	B Western
The Devil Wears Spurs	Charlton Thorpe	Bill McKinney, Nick Sowell	United States	Psychological Western
Dos bien puestos	Hernando Name	Eric del Castillo, Julio Alemán	United States; Mexico	
Dynamite Warrior	Chalerm Wongpim	Dan Chupong	Thailand	Hybrid Western
Emiliano Cadena: El méxicano	Hernando Name	Rafael Goyri, Claudia Vega	United States; Mexico	
The Far Side of Jericho	Tim Hunter	Patrick Bergin, Lawrence Pressman, James Gammon, John Diehl, C. Thomas Howell, Lissa Negrin, Judith Burnett, Suzanne Andrews	United States	Revisionist Western
The Quick and the Undead	Gerald Nott	Clint Glenn	United States	Horror Western
Seraphim Falls	David Von Ancken	Liam Neeson, Pierce Brosnan, Michael Wincott, Xander Berkeley, Ed Lauter, Tom Noonan, Kevin J. O'Connor, John Robinson, Anjelica Huston, Angie Harmon, Wes Studi	United States	Revenge Western
A Shot in the West	Robert Kelly	Alexander Watson, Zal Cleminson, David Hayman	Scotland	Western short
Sugar Creek	James Cotten	Dustin Alford, Jeff Bailey	United States	Supernatural/thriller Western
Summer Love	Piotr Uklański	Bogusław Linda, Karel Roden, Val Kilmer	Poland	Outlaw Western
Vengeance Trail	Stephen McCurry	Mark Craig, Jeff Dolan	United States	Traditional Western
2007
3:10 to Yuma	James Mangold	Russell Crowe, Christian Bale, Logan Lerman, Ben Foster, Gretchen Mol, Vinessa Shaw, Dallas Roberts, Peter Fonda, Luke Wilson	United States	Outlaw Western
All Hat	Leonard Faringer	Luke Kirby, Stephen McHattie, Keith Carradine, Lisa Ray, Rachael Leigh Cook	Canada	Comedy Western
The Assassination of Jesse James by the Coward Robert Ford	Andrew Dominik	Brad Pitt, Casey Affleck, Sam Shepard, Mary-Louise Parker, Jeremy Renner, Sam Rockwell, Paul Schneider, Zooey Deschanel, Garret Dillahunt, Ted Levine, James Carville, Alison Elliott, Michael Parks, Tom Aldredge, Pat Healy	United States	Outlaw Western
Avenging Angel	David S. Cass, Sr.	Kevin Sorbo	United States	
BloodRayne II: Deliverance	Uwe Boll	Natassia Malthe, Zack Ward	Canada; Germany	Horror Western
Bury My Heart at Wounded Knee	Yves Simoneau	Aidan Quinn, Adam Beach, August Schellenberg, Anna Paquin, Colm Feore, Fred Thompson, Nathan Lee Chasing His Horse, Gordon Tootoosis, Eddie Spears, Eric Schweig, Jimmy Herman, J.K. Simmons, Wes Studi	United States	Revisionist Western
Cartel, 1882	Chuck Walker	Michael Gregory, Leslie Easterbrook	United States	
Dead Noon	Andrew Wiest	Kane Hodder, Robert Bear	United States	Horror Western
Ghost Town: The Movie	Jeff Kennedy, Dean Teaster	Herbert Coward, Bill McKinney, DJ Perry	United States	
Left for Dead	Albert Pyun	María Alche, Soledad Arocena	United States	Horror Western
The Legend of God's Gun	Mike Bruce	Kirpatrick Thomas, Bobby Bones	United States	
The Mustachioed Bandit Meets His End	Paul Blair	Doug Swim, Cazimir Milostan	United States	
No Country for Old Men	Coen Brothers	Tommy Lee Jones, Javier Bardem, Josh Brolin, Kelly Macdonald, Woody Harrelson, Garret Dillahunt, Tess Harper, Barry Corbin, Beth Grant	United States	Contemporary Western
Retribution Road	Chuck Walker	Michael Gregory, John Castellanos, Leslie Easterbrook	United States	Traditional Western
Roswell 1847	Ian Paterson	Gabrielle Amies, Norman Lovett	United States	Science fiction Western
September Dawn	Christopher Cain	Jon Voight, Terence Stamp, Lolita Davidovich, Dean Cain, Jon Gries	United States	Revisionist Western
Shiloh Falls	Adrian Fulle	John Bader, Steve Bannos	United States	Horror Western
Sukiyaki Western: Django	Takashi Miike	Hideaki Itō, Masanobu Andō	Japan	Samurai Western
There Will Be Blood	Paul Thomas Anderson	Daniel Day-Lewis, Paul F. Tompkins, Dillon Freasier	United States	Contemporary Western
Undead or Alive	Glasgow Philips	Chris Kattan, James Denton	United States	Horror Western
2008
Aces 'N' Eights	Craig R. Baxley	Casper Van Dien, Bruce Boxleitner, Ernest Borgnine, Deirdre Quinn, Jack Noseworthy, Jake Thomas, Jeff Kober, William Atherton	United States	Traditional Western
Appaloosa	Ed Harris	Ed Harris, Viggo Mortensen, Renée Zellweger, Jeremy Irons, Lance Henriksen, James Gammon, Rex Linn	United States	Traditional Western
The Burrowers	J.T. Petty	Clancy Brown, William Mapother, Laura Leighton	United States	Horror Western
Chinaman's Chance	Aki Aleong	Reggie Lee	United States	Revisionist Western
Comanche Moon	Simon Wincer	Val Kilmer, Steve Zahn, Karl Urban, Linda Cardellini, Elizabeth Banks, Ryan Merriman, Ray McKinnon, Keith Robinson, Wes Studi, Adam Beach, James Rebhorn, Jake Busey, Jeremy Ratchford, Brad Johnson	United States	Traditional Western
Copperhead	Todor Chapkanov	Brad Johnson, Keith Stone, Brad Greenquist, Wendy Carter, Gabriel Womack, Billy Drago	United States	Horror Western
Fistful of Brains	Christine Parker	Jaqueline Martini, Conrad Osborne	United States	Horror Western
The Good, the Bad, the Weird	Kim Jee-woon	Song Kang-ho, Lee Byung-hun, Jung Woo-sung	South Korea	Manchurian Western
A Gunfighter's Pledge	Armand Mastroianni	Luke Perry, C. Thomas Howell, Kim Coates, Jaclyn DeSantis, Francesco Quinn, Wyatt Smith, Franc Ross	United States	Traditional Western
Lone Rider	David S. Cass, Sr.	Lou Diamond Phillips, Stacy Keach, Vincent Spano, Mike Starr, Marta DuBois, Cynthia Preston, Angela Alvarado, Robert Baker, Timothy Bottoms	United States	B Western
The Man Who Came Back	Glen Pitre	Eric Braeden, Billy Zane, George Kennedy, Armand Assante, Sean Young, Carol Alt, James Patrick Stuart, Ken Norton, Peter Jason, Jennifer O'Dell	United States	Traditional Western
One-Eyed Horse	Wayne Shipley	Mark Redfield, Jennifer Rouse	United States	
Prairie Fever	Stephen Bridgewater, David S. Cass, Sr.	Kevin Sorbo, Dominique Swain, Lance Henriksen, Jamie Anne Allman, Jillian Armenante, Felicia Day, Lucy Lee Flippin, Robert Norsworthy, Don Swayze	United States	
Shoot First and Pray You Live	Lance Doty	James Russo, John Doman, Clay Wilcox, Jim Gaffigan	United States	Traditional Western
Six Reasons Why	Jeff Campagna, Matthew Campagna	Dan Wooster, Colm Feore	United States	Science fiction Western
2009
All Hell Broke Loose	Christopher Forbes	David Carradine, Jim Hilton	United States	B Western
Angel and the Badman	Terry Ingram	Lou Diamond Phillips, Deborah Kara Unger, Luke Perry	United States	B Western
The Bastard Men of Root Flats	Marco Chierichella	Cameron Mayo, Zack Abramowitz, Gene Canfield	United States	B Western
Dead Walkers	Spencer Estabrooks	Michael Shepherd, Cheryl Hanley, Brendan Hunter	Canada	Horror Western
The Donner Party	T.J. Martin	Crispin Glover, Clayne Crawford, Michele Santopietro, Mark Boone Junior, Christian Kane, Catherine Black	United States	Period Western
Dual	Steven R. Monroe	Michael Worth, Tim Thomerson, Karen Kim	United States	Mystery Western
Ecstasy of Gold	Adam Oxsen	John Elliott, Narisa Suzuki, Brad Allen	United States	B Western
The Gambler, the Girl and the Gunslinger	Anne Wheeler	Dean Cain, James Tupper, Allison Hossack	Canada	B Western
High Plains Invaders	K.T. Donaldson	James Marsters, Cindy Sampson, Sebastian Knapp	United States; Romania	Science fiction Western
Hungry Hills	Rob W. King	Keir Gilchrist, Alexander De Jordy, Alexia Fast	Canada	B Western
The Hunter's Moon	Stephen Savage	Wes Studi, Conor O'Farrell, Stefan Gierash	United States	B Western
Lucky Luke	James Huth	Jean Dujardin, Michaël Youn	France	Comedy Western
Meaner Than Hell	Edward M. Erdelac	Alex Bakalarz, Jared Cohn	United States	B Western
Mexican Gold	Chuck Walker	Lorenzo Lamas, John Castellanos, J. Eddie Peck	United States	Traditional Western
The Only Good Indian	Kevin Willmott	Wes Studi, J. Kenneth Campbell, Winter Fox Frank, Paul Butler, Thirza Dafoe, Christopher Wheatley, Laura Kirk, Delana Studi	United States	Revisionist Western
Palo Pinto Gold	Anthony Henslee	Trent Willmon, Roy Clark, Mel Tillis	United States	B Western
Reach for the Sky	Alan Chan	Adam Hagenbuch, Hannah Hague, Richard L. Olsen	United States	B Western
Redemption	Robert Conway	Dustin Leighton, Tom Noga, Clint James	United States	Psychological Western
Shadowheart	Dean Alioto	Angus Macfadyen, Justin Ament, Marnie Alton	United States	Traditional Western
The Showdown	Jim Conover	Jim Conover, Dan Barth, Dave Barth	United States	B Western
Shroud	David Jetre	Nicole Leigh Jones, Dylan Barth, G. Russell Reynolds	United States	Horror Western
Stingray Sam	Cory McAbee	Cory McAbee, Joshua Taylor, Michael De Nola, Ron Crawford	United States	Space Western
Sumbitch!	Romulo Vega	Justin Teeters	United States	Comedy Western

== See also ==
- List of TV Westerns
