= East Bay Dragons =

Motorcycle club

East Bay Dragons MC
- Founded: 1959
- Founder: Tobie Gene Levingston
- Founded at: Oakland, California, U.S.
- Type: Outlaw motorcycle club
- Region served: California

The East Bay Dragons MC is an all-black, all-male, Harley Davidson-riding outlaw motorcycle club founded in Oakland, California, in 1959 by Tobie Gene Levingston, who died in July 2020.

== History ==
=== As a car club ===
Levingston founded the car club shortly after arriving to Oakland from Louisiana in 1955 with the intent of providing an outlet to keep his younger brother and friends off the rough and tumble streets of Oakland. The car club did not adopt the official name "Dragons Car Club" until 1958. The words "East Bay" were added by member Joe Louis, signifying their region of origin. By 1959, the East Bay Dragons had developed a reputation among Oakland Police Department for their numerous melees and brawls with local street gangs from East and West Oakland. The turning point for the car club came following an incident at a local party at the Snow Building, a rented hall by the Oakland Zoo, adjacent to the Grass Valley neighborhood of the Oakland Hills. A fight broke out, and one of the members drove his car through the front door of the building onto the dance floor.

=== Move to a motorcycle club ===
After constant harassment and profiling from the local police, Levingston had considered disbanding the car club. Long time friend Sonny Barger suggested he switch the club from a car club to a motorcycle club because bikes were more discreet than cars, easier to maintain and cheaper to work on. After following the recommendation of Barger, The East Bay Dragons officially became a motorcycle club in 1959. In addition to trouble with the Oakland Police Department, at that time the idea of sustaining a car club became difficult. Many working class and working poor black families could not afford more than one car per household and Dragons members were no exception. Many club members could only have access to the family car either during the weekends or late at night.

Motorcycles were more practical because they were not depended on by an entire household. In 1959, and even well into the sixties, although there were two Harley Davidson dealerships in Oakland, no dealership in the Bay Area would sell bikes to black customers. All the original founding members had to buy used bikes. This was far more affordable as new bikes cost around $500 yet a used Harley Davidson could be bought for as little as $30.

Prior to the East Bay Dragons, the only other black outlaw motorcycle club in the Bay Area was the Fillmore-based Frisco Rattlers MC.

Along with the Chosen Few MC and Los Angeles Defiant Ones MC, the East Bay Dragons are one of the oldest surviving predominantly black motorcycle clubs founded in California, (the LA Defiant Ones were founded two years earlier in 1957). The East Bay Dragons, LA Defiant Ones and Outcast MC (founded 1969), are the oldest surviving all-black motorcycle clubs requiring members to only ride American-made motorcycles.

== Community involvement ==
=== The Black Panther Party for Self Defense ===
The Black Panthers and The East Bay Dragons Motorcycle Club were sometimes mistaken for each other by law enforcement. In Spring of 1967, East Bay Dragons member Joe Louis opened up Papa Joe’s Soul Food a few short blocks from the clubhouse. The Black Panthers’s earliest headquarters was just a few blocks from the Dragons’s clubhouse. Founders Huey Newton and Bobby Seale and chief of staff David Hilliard often came in and ate in Joe’s restaurant. The East Bay Dragons had already established a strong presence within communities in East Oakland. During the initial phases of the creation of the Black Panthers, Newton and Seale approached the East Bay Dragons for ideas and support.

When Huey P. Newton went to jail for the 1967 shootout between the Oakland cops and the Panthers, many members of the Dragons attended Free Huey rallies at De Fremery Park. A lot of the members attended weekend rallies to show off their bikes and to listen to speeches given by prominent Black Power movement leaders of the day. Due to the support both organizations had for each other, some of the Black Panthers eventually became members of the East Bay Dragons after the Black Panthers disbanded.

=== Community service ===
The East Bay Dragons have a record of service to the community and have supported many local charitable organizations, including riding for breast cancer, AIDS awareness and violence awareness. Every Labor Day Weekend they host annual block parties in September at their clubhouse using proceeds to donate school supplies and gift certificates to families of East Oakland to purchase children's school clothes and supplies. Every November they hold an annual turkey drive for Thanksgiving, providing turkeys and other food staples for families in need. During the Christmas season, they sponsor a toy drive and deliver toys to Oakland children on their bikes, while dressing up as Santa Claus.

=== Golden State Warriors victory parade ===
The East Bay Dragons were featured in the 2015 victory parade through downtown Oakland commemorating the 2015 NBA Championship of the Golden State Warriors.

=== Music ===
Oakland rapper Richie Rich is a long-standing member of the East Bay Dragons and has featured the club in many of his music videos.

== Insignia ==
The insignia is a large square patch featuring the club name in red text placed above the logo of a green dragon over a yellow background. The two bottom patches displayed on their cuts showing their territory are one rectangular patch with "Oakland" in red text over a yellow background above another rectangular patch with "California" in red text over a yellow background.

The East Bay Dragons colors are red and gold. Like the Bandidos Motorcycle Club and Flaming Knights Motorcycle Club, their club name is prominently displayed in red text over a yellow background, however, the Dragons are not affiliated with either club in any way be it "dominant MC" or "support MC" and was founded prior to both clubs.

== Differences from other motorcycle clubs ==
=== Drill teams ===
Until 1959, most black motorcycle clubs were "Drill Teams" consisting of World War II veterans. These drill teams performed group routines consisting of stunts and challenging maneuvers weaving in and out of cones and between other motorcyclists. Unlike other African-American motorcycle clubs and drill teams of the late 1940s and 1950s which rode full-dressers, the East Bay Dragons rode choppers.

=== Expansion and growth ===
Since its inception and official establishing as a motorcycle club, the East Bay Dragons have no desire to establish multiple chapters in or outside of California, have only one chapter, and have remained at the same clubhouse in East Oakland where they have been based for over 45 years. Unlike most motorcycle clubs, the East Bay Dragons do not have a "prospect" or "probation" period for prospective members. They believe "you are either a member of the club or not, no in between". Prospective members who are "hangarounds" are referred to by club members as "rookies" while they are being vetted for membership prior to being voted in as full patch members.

=== Patch and insignia ===
During the 1940s and 1950s, the center patch and logo patch of most motorcycle clubs were circular or oval in shape whereas for car clubs, they were square or rectangular shaped. Because the East Bay Dragons were founded as a car club, they adopted the square shaped patch which stood with the club even after they switched and became a motorcycle club. Unlike many outlaw motorcycle clubs, the East Bay Dragons do not claim a state as territory by wearing a bottom "rocker". The bottom patches displaying their territory are rectangular, not curved.

== Cultural impact ==
Kurt Sutter has stated that the inspiration for the fictional motorcycle club The Grim Bastards, portrayed by an authentic Black American MC called 1DOWNMC; featured in the television show Sons of Anarchy was loosely based on the East Bay Dragons and their relationship with the Hells Angels that surpassed racial barriers during the 1960s and 1970s.
