= The Decoy =

The Decoy is the name of a number of films:

- The Decoy (1914 film)
- The Decoy (1915 film)
- The Decoy (1916 film)
- The Decoy (1918 film)
- The Decoy (2006 film)
