= After Sundown =

After Sundown may refer to:

- After Sundown (1911 film), an Australian film
- After Sundown (2006 film), an American film
- After Sundown (2023 film), a Thai film
