= Hells Angels =

International motorcycle club

Hells Angels MC
- Abbreviation: HA; 81; HAMC; Big Red Machine
- Founded: March 17, 1948; 78 years ago
- Founder: Otto Friedli
- Founded at: Fontana, California, U.S.
- Type: Outlaw motorcycle club
- Headquarters: Oakland, California, U.S.
- Region served: Worldwide (592 charters in 66 countries)
- Members: Over 6,000
- Key people: Sonny Barger
- Website: Official website

The Hells Angels Motorcycle Club (HAMC) is an international outlaw motorcycle club founded in California whose members typically ride Harley-Davidson motorcycles. In the United States and Canada, the Hells Angels are incorporated as the Hells Angels Motorcycle Corporation. Common nicknames for the club are the "H.A.", "Red & White", and "81". With a membership of over 6,000, and 592 charters in 66 countries, the HAMC is the largest outlaw biker club in the world.

The Hells Angels have a history of involvement in organized crime, such as drug trafficking, and engaging in violent conflict with other outlaw motorcycle clubs. Involvement in organized crime and violence has historically extended to the organization's most senior leadership. Many police and international intelligence agencies, including the United States Department of Justice, the Criminal Intelligence Service Canada, the Australian Federal Police, and Europol, consider the club an organized crime syndicate.

== History ==
The Hells Angels originated on March 17, 1948, in Fontana, California, when several small motorcycle clubs agreed to merge. Otto Friedli, a World War II veteran, is credited with starting the club after breaking from the Pissed Off Bastards motorcycle club over a feud with a rival gang. According to an alternative theory, the Hells Angels were founded on November 15, 1951, in San Bernardino, by Dick White, a member of the Redlands Road Runners.

According to its website, the club's name was suggested by Arvid Olson, an associate of the founders who had served in the "Hell's Angels" squadron of the Flying Tigers in China during World War II. In a letter written to The Guinness Book of World Records by a member on the Hells Angels' behalf, it is instead stated that the club's name was taken from the "Hell's Angels" squadron of the 303rd Bombardment Group, which was active in the European theater of World War II. It is at least clear that the name was inspired by the tradition from World Wars I and II whereby the Americans gave their squadrons fierce, death-defying titles; an example of this lies in one of the three P-40 squadrons of Flying Tigers fielded in Burma and China, which was dubbed "Hell's Angels". In 1930, the Howard Hughes film Hell's Angels showcased extraordinary and dangerous feats of aviation, and it is believed that World War II groups that used that name based it on the film. According to the Hells Angels' website, they are aware that there is an apostrophe missing in "Hells", but "... it is you who miss it. We don't".

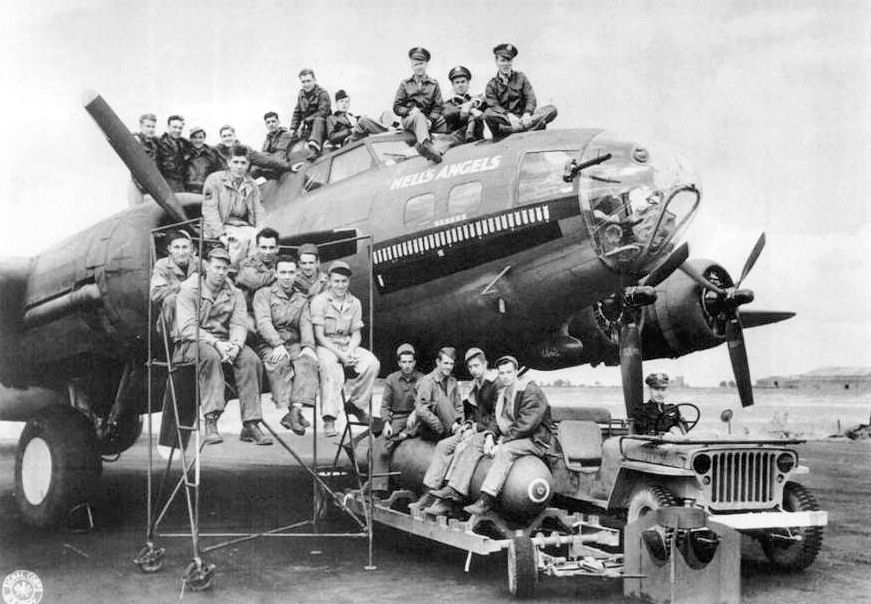
This B-17F, tail number 41–24577, was named Hell's Angels after the 1930 Howard Hughes movie about World War I fighter pilots.

Some of the HAMC's early history is not clear, and accounts differ. The club's first official charter was reportedly drawn up in Fontana in 1950. Various autonomous Hells Angels charters were formed throughout California in the decade following the club's foundation, by nomadic members who moved from one city to another. The San Francisco ("Frisco") charter was reportedly founded by former members of the Market Street Commandos in 1954. A North Sacramento charter was established in 1956, followed by another charter in Sacramento the following year, which was formed by two brothers, James "Mother" Miles and Pat Miles, who were former members of the Hell Bent for Glory biker club. The Sacramento charter later disbanded and relocated to Richmond as a Nomads chapter in 1965. According to Ralph "Sonny" Barger, founder of the Oakland charter in 1957, other early charters of the club were founded in Gardena, and elsewhere, with the members usually unaware that there were other clubs. One of the lesser-known clubs was in North Chino/South Pomona in the late 1960s. Barger has been credited with helping to unify these various disparate charters under common club bylaws.

Other sources claim that the San Francisco Hells Angels were organized in 1953 by Rocky Graves, a Hells Angel member from San Bernardino ("Berdoo"), implying that the "Frisco" Hells Angels were very much aware of their forebears. The "Frisco" Hells Angels were reorganized in 1955 with 13 charter members, Frank Sadilek serving as president, and the smaller, original logo. The Oakland charter, at the time headed by Barger, used a larger version of the "Death's Head" patch nicknamed the "Barger Larger", which was first used in 1959. It later became the club standard. The first charter to open outside California was established in Auckland, New Zealand, in 1961.

The Hells Angels are often depicted in semi-mythical romantic fashion like the 19th-century James–Younger Gang: free-spirited, iconic, bound by brotherhood and loyalty. At other times, such as in the 1966 Roger Corman film The Wild Angels, they are depicted as violent and nihilistic, little more than a violent criminal gang and a scourge on society.

The club became prominent within, and established its notoriety as part of, the 1960s counterculture movement in San Francisco's Haight-Ashbury District, playing a part at many of the movement's seminal events. Members were directly connected to many of the counterculture's primary leaders, such as Ken Kesey and the Merry Pranksters, Allen Ginsberg, Jerry Garcia and the Grateful Dead, Timothy Leary, The Beatles, The Rolling Stones, Mick Farren, and Tom Wolfe. "Gonzo" journalist Hunter S. Thompson's book about the club launched his career. From 1968 to 1969 the Hells Angels of San Francisco headquarters was at 715 Ashbury (across from the Grateful Dead house at 710 Ashbury). In 1969, members of the Oakland, California chapter of the club provided security for the Altamont Free Concert at the Altamont Speedway by the management of the Rolling Stones in exchange for $500 worth of beer. Infamously during the concert, one of the members had knocked Marty Balin of Jefferson Airplane unconscious and later on in the concert, another member had stabbed and killed Meredith Hunter after he had drawn a .22 caliber revolver.

In 1973, members from several branches of the organization protested at an Environmental Protection Agency hearing about a proposed transportation plan that included restrictions on motorcycle use and sales to get California to meet the new Clean Air Act standards.

== Insignia ==
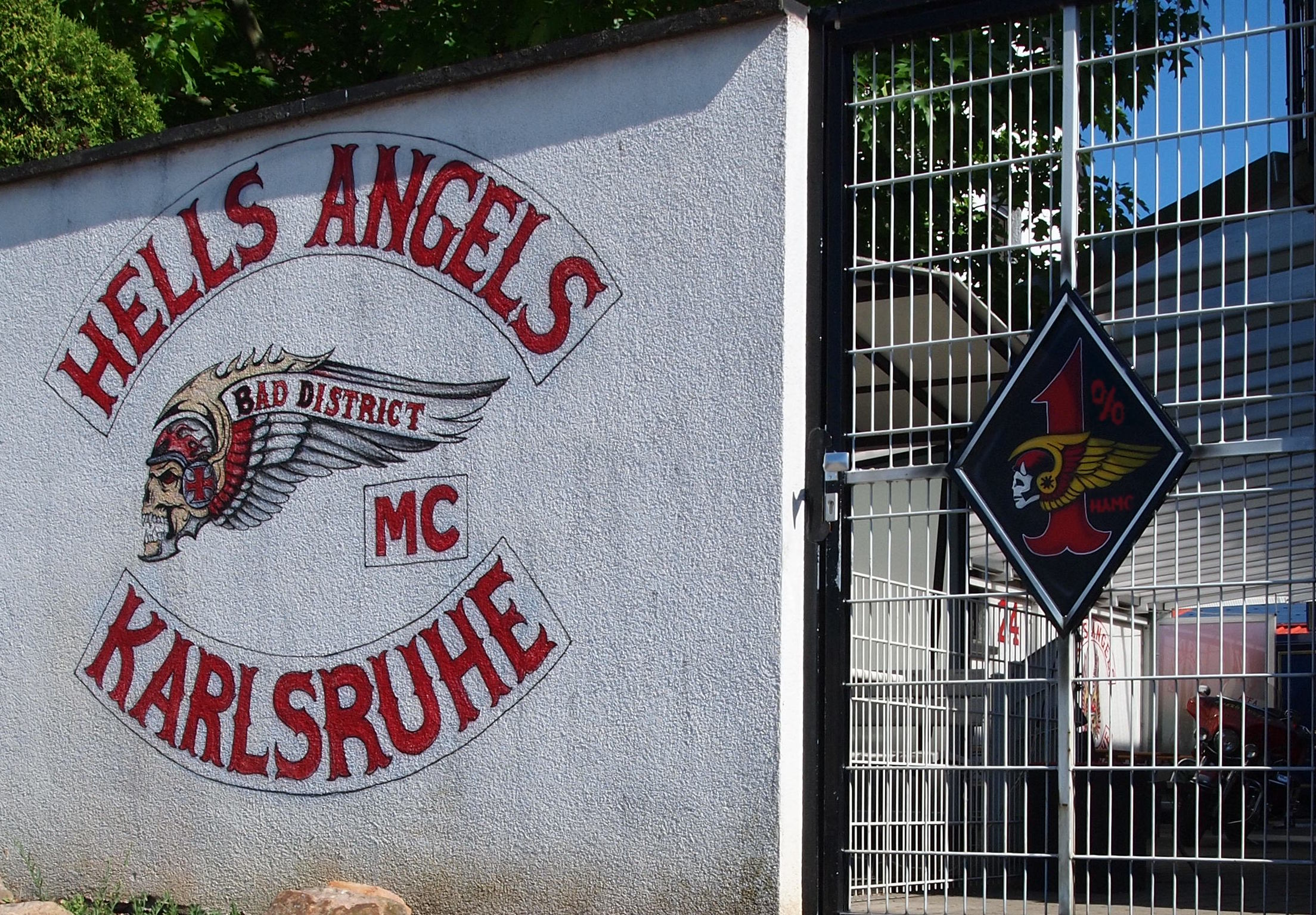
Insignia of the Hells Angels from Karlsruhe charter, with the '1%' patch on the gates

The Hells Angels' official website attributes the official "death's head" insignia design to Frank Sadilek, past president of the San Francisco charter. The colors and shape of the early-style jacket emblem (before 1953) were copied from the insignias of the 85th Fighter Squadron and the 552nd Medium Bomber Squadron.

The Hells Angels have a system of patches similar to military medals. The specific meaning of each patch is not publicly known, but the patches identify each biker's specific or significant actions or beliefs. The official colors of the Hells Angels are red lettering displayed on a white background—hence the club's nickname "The Red and White". The patches are worn on leather or denim jackets and vests.

Red and white are also used to display the number 81 on many patches, as in "Support 81", "Route 81". The 8 and 1 stand for the respective positions in the alphabet of H and A. Friends and supporters of the club use these in deference to club rules, which purport to restrict the wearing of Hells Angels imagery to club members. The diamond-shaped one-percenter patch is also used, displaying "1%" in red on a white background with a red merrowed border. The term "one-percenter" is said to be a response to the American Motorcyclist Association (AMA) comment on the Hollister incident to the effect that 99% of motorcyclists were law-abiding citizens and 1% were outlaws. The AMA has no record of such a statement and calls this story apocryphal.

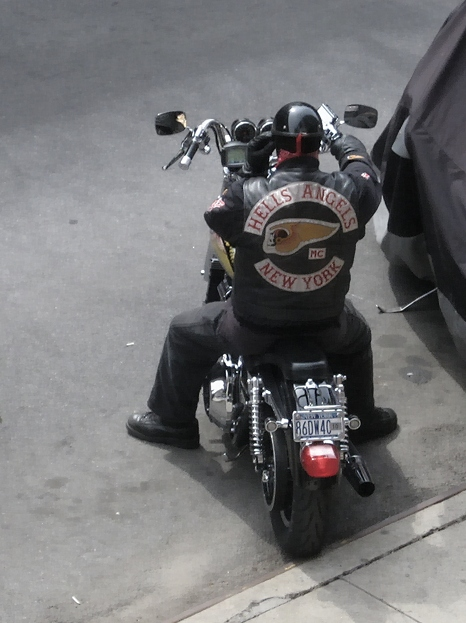
New York Hells Angels patch

Most members wear a rectangular patch (again, white background with red letters and a red merrowed border) identifying their respective charter locations. Another similarly designed patch reads "Hells Angels". When applicable, members of the club wear a patch denoting their position or rank within the organization. The patch is rectangular and, like those described above, displays a white background with red letters and a red merrowed border. Some examples of the titles used are President, Vice President, Secretary, Treasurer, and Sergeant at Arms. This patch is usually worn above the charter location patch. Some members also wear an "AFFA" patch, which stands for "Angels Forever; Forever Angels", referring to their lifelong membership in the club (i.e., "once a member, always a member").

An additional patch worn by select club members consists of two Nazi-style SS lightning bolts below the words "Filthy Few". Some law enforcement officials claim that the "Filthy Few" patch is awarded only to those who have committed or are prepared to commit murder on the club's behalf. Hells Angels have denied this interpretation, however, comparing it instead to a merit badge awarded to those who are "the first to arrive at a party and the last to leave". According to reports from law enforcement and prosecutors, another patch similar to the "Filthy Few" patch is the "Dequiallo" patch. "Dequiallo" is a reference to El Degüello, a bugle call played by the regimental band of Antonio López de Santa Anna's army at the Battle of the Alamo. This patch allegedly "signifies that the wearer has fought law enforcement on arrest." There is no common convention as to where the patches are placed on members' jackets/vests.

"Angels Forever, Forever Angels" is also the club's traditional motto. Other Hells Angels slogans include "When we do right, nobody remembers. When we do wrong, nobody forgets"; "Three can keep a secret if two are dead"; and "When in doubt, knock 'em out", which was coined by New York City charter member Vincent "Big Vinny" Girolamo.

=== Intellectual property rights ===
The Hells Angels incorporated in 1966, trademarking the club's name and insignia. The club filed a trademark infringement lawsuit for the first time on October 26, 1989, when the Hells Angels lodged a federal lawsuit in Los Angeles against Concorde-New Horizons, which produced the film Nam Angels, and against Media Home Entertainment, which distributed the film on video, over infringements on the club's registered trademarks. The suit was settled out of court.

In October 1992, the Hells Angels sued Marvel Comics in a trademark dispute over the comic book character Hell's Angel. Marvel used the name "Hell's Angel" in five comic book issues beginning in July 1992 before changing the character's name to Dark Angel. The lawsuit was settled in February 1993 when Marvel agreed to donate $35,000 to the children's charity Ronald McDonald House.

According to The Globe and Mail, the Hells Angels considered seeking an injunction to block the Canadian Broadcasting Corporation from broadcasting the miniseries The Last Chapter, because of how closely the biker gang at the center of the series resembled the Hells Angels.

In March 2007, the Hells Angels filed suit against the Walt Disney Motion Pictures Group alleging that its film Wild Hogs used both the name and distinctive logo of the HAMC without permission. The suit was eventually voluntarily dismissed after the Angels received assurances from Disney that the references would not appear in the film.

In October 2010, the Hells Angels filed a lawsuit against Alexander McQueen for "misusing its trademark winged death heads symbol" in several items from its Autumn/Winter 2010 collection. The lawsuit also aimed at Saks Fifth Avenue and Zappos.com, which stock the jacquard box dress and knuckle duster ring that bear the symbol, which has been used since at least 1948 and is protected by the U.S. Patent and Trademark Office. A handbag and scarf were also named in the lawsuit. The lawyer representing Hells Angels claimed: "This isn't just about money, it's about membership. If you've got one of these rings on, a member might get really upset that you're an impostor." Saks refused to comment, Zappos had no immediate comment and the company's parent company, PPR, could not be reached for comment. The company settled the case with the Hells Angels after agreeing to remove all of the merchandise featuring the logo from sale on their website, stores and concessions and recalling any goods that had already been sold and destroying them.

In fall 2012 in the United States District Court for the Eastern District of California, Hells Angels sued Toys "R" Us for trademark infringement, unfair competition, and dilution in relation to the sale of yo-yos manufactured by Yomega Corporation, a co-defendant, which allegedly bear the "Death Head" logo. In its complaint, Hells Angels asserted that the mark on the yo-yos would likely lead people to mistakenly believe that the toys originate with Hells Angels. Yomega filed counterclaims against Hells Angels for cancellation of the "Death Head" registrations on grounds of alleged fraud in the procurement of the registrations. The case settled and the lawsuit was dismissed with prejudice.

As of December 2013, the Hells Angels sells its branded merchandise at a retail store in Toronto, Ontario.

In 2019, the Hells Angels sued Redbubble in the Federal Court of Australia for infringing on its trademark, launching another suit in 2021 after providing evidence that Redbubble had continued to breach the trademark. The 2019 case concluded with the Hells Angels being awarded $5,000 in damages. In July 2022, in the second ruling against Redbubble, the company was ordered to pay the club more than $78,000.

== Membership ==
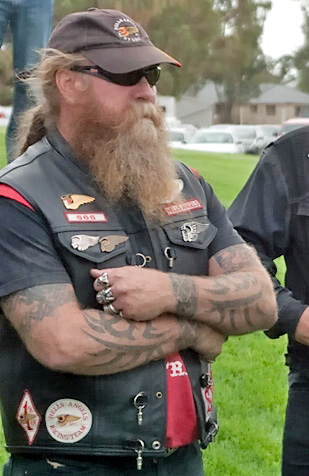
A club member at a biker gathering in Australia, 2008

To become a Hells Angels "prospect", candidates must have a valid driver's license, a motorcycle over 750cc (46 cu in), and "the right combination of personal qualities." It is said the club excludes child molesters and people who have applied to become police or prison officers. Intravenous drug use is also forbidden among club members. Members in North America are required to ride U.S.-built motorcycles; Harley-Davidson bikes are most common in the club, although other American brands, such as Victory and Indian, are also permitted.

After a lengthy, phased process, a prospective member is first deemed a "hang-around", indicating that he is invited to some club events or to meet club members at known gathering places. If the "hang-around" is interested, he may be asked to become an "associate", a status that usually lasts a year or two. At the end of that stage, he is reclassified as "prospect", participating in some club activities, but not having voting privileges while he is evaluated for suitability as a full member. The last phase, and highest membership status, is full membership or "full-patch". The term "full-patch" refers to the complete four-piece insignia, including the "Death Head" logo, two rockers (top rocker: "Hells Angels"; bottom rocker: state or territory claimed) and the rectangular "MC" patch below the wing of the Death's Head. Prospects are allowed to wear only a bottom rocker with the state, province or territory name along with the rectangular "MC" patch.

To become a full member, a "prospect" must be unanimously confirmed by the rest of the full club members. Before votes are cast, a "prospect" usually travels to every charter in the sponsoring charter's geographic jurisdiction (state, province, or territory) and introduces himself to every "full-patch" member. This allows each voting member to become familiar with the "prospect" and ask any questions of concern before voting. Some form of formal induction follows, wherein the "prospect" affirms his loyalty to the club and its members. The final logo patch (top "Hells Angels" rocker) is then awarded at the initiation ceremony. The step of attaining full membership can be called "being patched".

Even after a member is patched in, the patches remain the property of HAMC, not the member. On leaving the Hells Angels or being ejected, a member must return his patches to the club. Members must pay dues, and are required to attend mandatory club meetings and motorcycle runs. Charter meetings, known as "church", are typically held at clubhouses or a member's residence. In 1978, members were required to pay $20 per month to the local charter, and $10 per month to the state charter. The money is used by the club to finance motorcycle runs and funerals, and to fund the travel of club officers to state and national meetings. Hells Angels may become exempt from paying dues after a certain period of time as a member of the club.

=== Racial policies ===
The club is not officially a racially segregated organization. In the United States, at least one charter allegedly requires that a candidate be a white male, and Sonny Barger said in a 2000 BBC interview, "The club, as a whole, is not racist but we probably have enough racist members that no black guy is going to get in it." At that time the club had no black members.

In another interview with Barger in 2000, he said, "if you're a motorcycle rider and you're white, you want to join the Hells Angels. If you're black, you want to join the Dragons. That's how it is whether anyone likes it or not. We don't have no blacks and they don't have no whites." When asked whether that could change, Barger replied, "Anything can change. I can't predict the future." Tobie Levingston, who formed the black motorcycle club East Bay Dragons MC, wrote in his book that he and Barger have a long-lasting friendship and that the Hells Angels and Dragons have a mutual friendship and hang out and ride together.

In a 1966 Ebony article about motorcycle rebels in the African-American community, the Chosen Few Motorcycle Club said that they see no racial animosity in the Hells Angels and that when they come into Chosen Few territory they all get together and party. A Hells Angel member interviewed for the magazine insisted there was no racial prejudice in any of their clubs. He said, "we don't have any Negro members", but maintained that no blacks have sought membership. At one point in the 1970s, the Hells Angels sought to consolidate the various motorcycle clubs and offered every member of the Chosen Few a Hells Angels patch, an offer that was declined.

A few nonwhite members have been noted in the U.S. and internationally. In 1967, Hunter S. Thompson remarked upon a "Chinese Mel from [San Francisco] and Charley, a young Negro from Oakland". Steven Wayne Yee, a Chinese-American member of the Hells Angels' Cleveland charter, was convicted of murder in 1990. The Satan's Angels MC in Vancouver had a black member when it merged with the Hells Angels in 1983. The San Francisco and Anchorage charters threatened to have the Vancouver charter expelled from the club when they learned of the situation; the matter was ultimately resolved when the man changed his nationality to "Hawaiian". An unsanctioned Hells Angels charter in Windsor, England was granted official status in 1985 shortly after its only black member, John Mikkelsen, had died in police custody. Another notable is Haitian-born Gregory "Picasso" Woolley, a high-ranking member of the Rockers MC in Montreal, who was the protégé and bodyguard of Hells Angel boss Maurice "Mom" Boucher (who spent five years in a notoriously white-supremacist motorcycle gang, the SS). Woolley became an associate of the Hells Angels Montreal charter in the 1990s and later tried uniting street gangs in Quebec after Boucher was imprisoned.

=== Women ===
Although rare, the Hells Angels permitted female members until 1964, when Barger imposed a rule making the club male-only. Retired special agent Jay Dobyns explained that within the Hells Angels, there is a hierarchy among women. Older ladies who are wives or girlfriends of members are at the top. Messing with a member's partner leads to violence. Groupies also visit the clubhouse and freely move between members.

Media allegations of widespread sexual abuse and rape by some members of the gang have been described by Hunter S. Thompson mainly as the product of a moral panic, although his book contains extensive references to grooming, sexual coercion and premeditated gang-rape used as a punishment against women and girls accused of hurting the gang or its members' interests. According to Thompson, a common abuse strategy used by Angels was to exploit inebriated or drugged victims initially consenting to sex with one or several bikers, and to coerce them into having sex with a larger number of men. The victims' initial consent would be used both as a defence strategy in case of a trial or as a guarantee that they would not press charges out of fear to be publicly shamed during their testimony. Thompson also states that sexual violence was often followed by victims and witness intimidation by Angels or their female partners.

== Organization ==
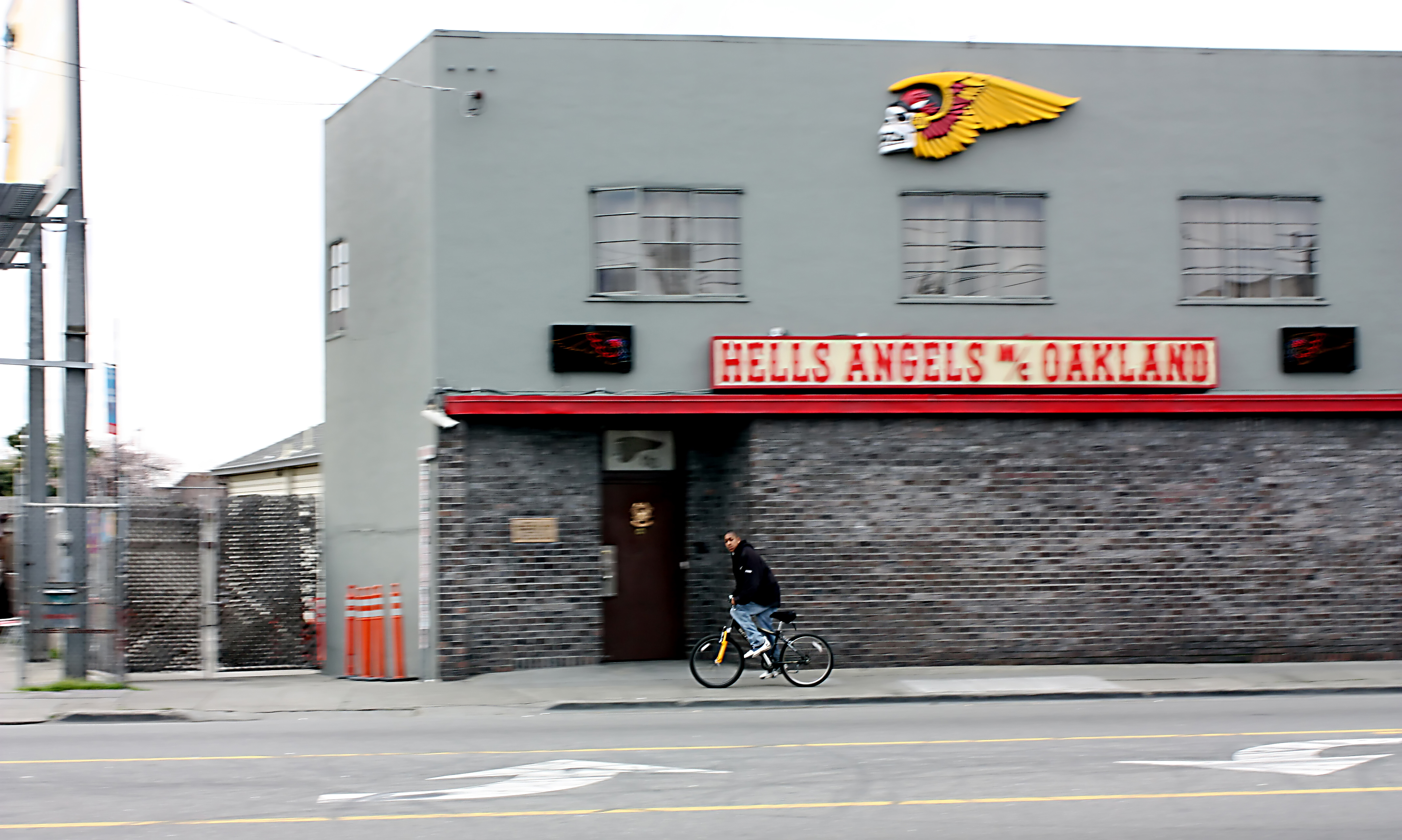
Hells Angels clubhouse in Oakland, California

The Hells Angels became the first notarized and organized outlaw motorcycle club, and the biker clubs formed subsequently have reportedly imitated the Angels' insignias, rules, doctrines and rituals. Hells Angels charters are governed by an officer corps, consisting of a president, vice president, secretary/treasurer, sergeant-at-arms and road captain. Charters are required to retain a minimum of six members, and are composed of between ten and twelve members on average. Each charter has autonomy regarding member discipline and minor policy changes.

In contrast to other prominent motorcycle clubs in the United States, the Hells Angels organization is not headed by a national or international president; it is instead governed by regional officers, who are each chosen to represent a collective of localized charters at monthly regional meetings. Regional officers are divided into two groups: those who attend the West Coast Officers Meeting ("WesCOM") to conduct the policy, actions, and affairs of the Hells Angels' charters in the Western United States, and those who attend the East Coast Officers Meeting ("ECOM") to govern the charters in the Eastern United States. The dividing point of the east and west regions is Omaha, Nebraska. In states with multiple charters, weekly state meetings are also held in addition to charter meetings.

Although the Hells Angels have no official "mother charter", the club's de facto national headquarters remained in its founding location of San Bernardino, California until club founder Otto Friedli was imprisoned in 1958. The club's unofficial headquarters was then relocated to Oakland, California by Sonny Barger, who succeeded Friedli as the Hells Angels' de facto national president. The Oakland charter has traditionally been able to maintain a preeminent position as "first among equals" because it has the largest membership of any charter the United States and because of Barger's esteem among club members internationally. The Oakland charter is responsible for making major decisions within the club and granting new charters. Any motorcycle club seeking to join to the Hells Angels must apply to the Oakland charter for membership, and the applicant club must be monitored and approved of by the Oakland Hells Angels before being granted membership.

In New York state, the HAMC is incorporated as the Church of Angels, a nonprofit religious organization.

=== Worldwide charters ===
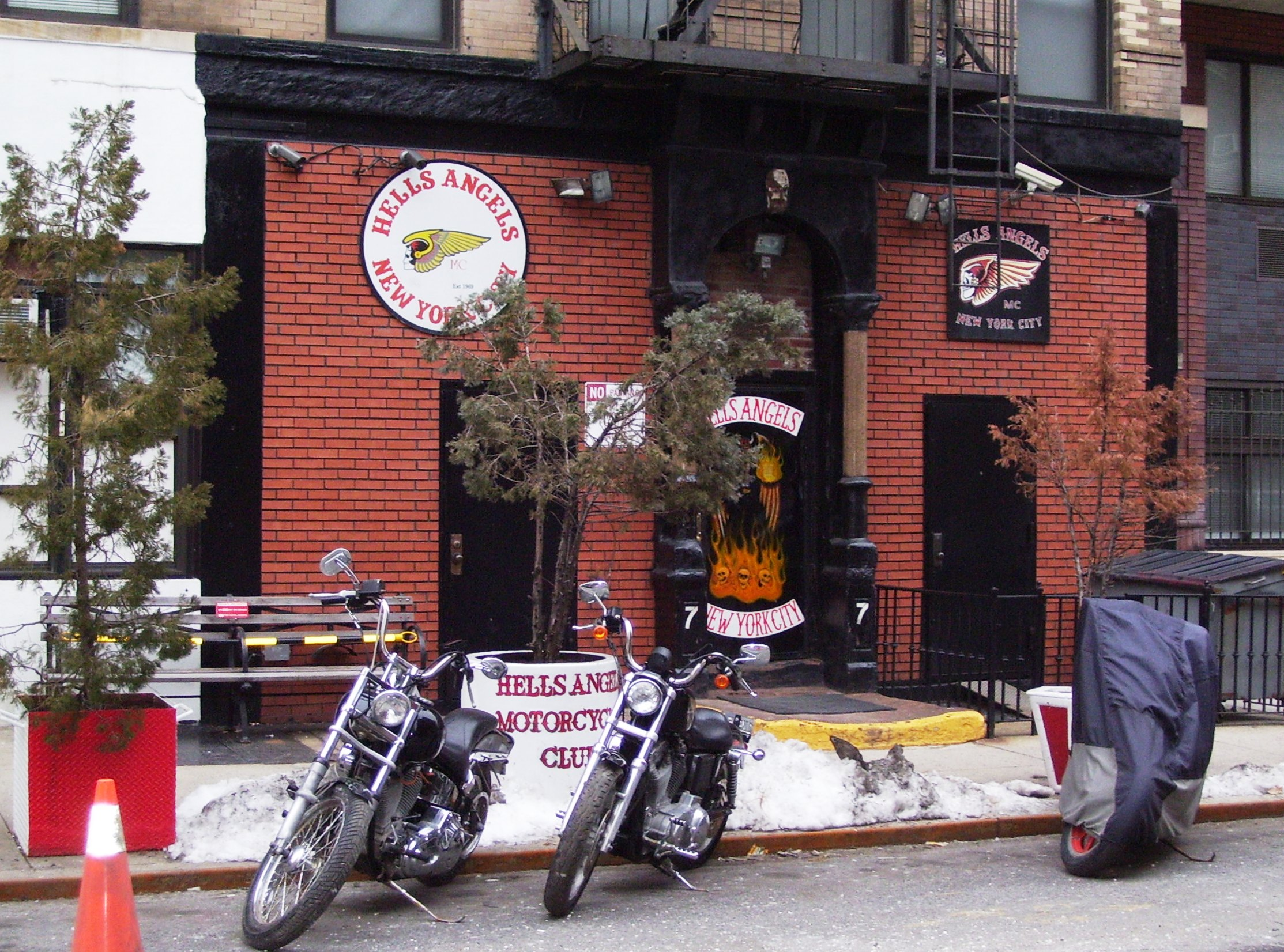
The former Hells Angels clubhouse at 77 East 3rd Street in the East Village neighborhood of Manhattan, New York City

The HAMC acknowledges more than 100 charters in over 29 countries. New Zealand had the first charter of the Hells Angels outside the United States; the club founded a charter in Auckland in 1961, and has since taken over gangs in Whanganui. Europe did not become widely home to the Hells Angels until 1969 when two London charters were formed. The Beatles' George Harrison invited some members of the HAMC San Francisco to stay at Apple Records in London in 1968. According to Chris O'Dell, only two members showed up, Frisco Pete and Bill "Sweet William" Fritsch. Two people from London visited California, "prospected", and ultimately joined. Two charters were issued on July 30, 1969; one for "South London"—the reimagined charter renewing the already existing 1950 South London charter—and the other for "East London", but by 1973 the two charters came together as one, called "London". The London Angels provided security at a number of UK Underground festivals, including Phun City in 1970, organized by Mick Farren. They awarded Farren an "approval patch" in 1970 for use on his first solo album Mona, which also featured Steve Peregrin Took (credited as "Shagrat the Vagrant").

In 1977, the Hells Angels arrived in Canada with the Popeye Moto Club patching over to form the Hells Angels' Montreal charter. During the 1980s and 1990s, there was a major expansion of the club into the rest of Canada. The Quebec Biker War was a violent turf war that began in 1994 and continued until late 2002 in Quebec. The war began when the Hells Angels in Quebec began to try to establish a monopoly on street-level drug sales in Quebec. Many drug dealers and crime families resisted and established groups such as the "Alliance to fight the Angels", led by the Rock Machine. The war resulted in the bombings of many establishments and murders on both sides. More than 160 people died, over 300 were injured, and over 100 bikers were incarcerated.

Members of the Spanish charter were involved in a killing and tried.

A list of acknowledged charters can be found on the HAMC's official website.

=== Support clubs ===
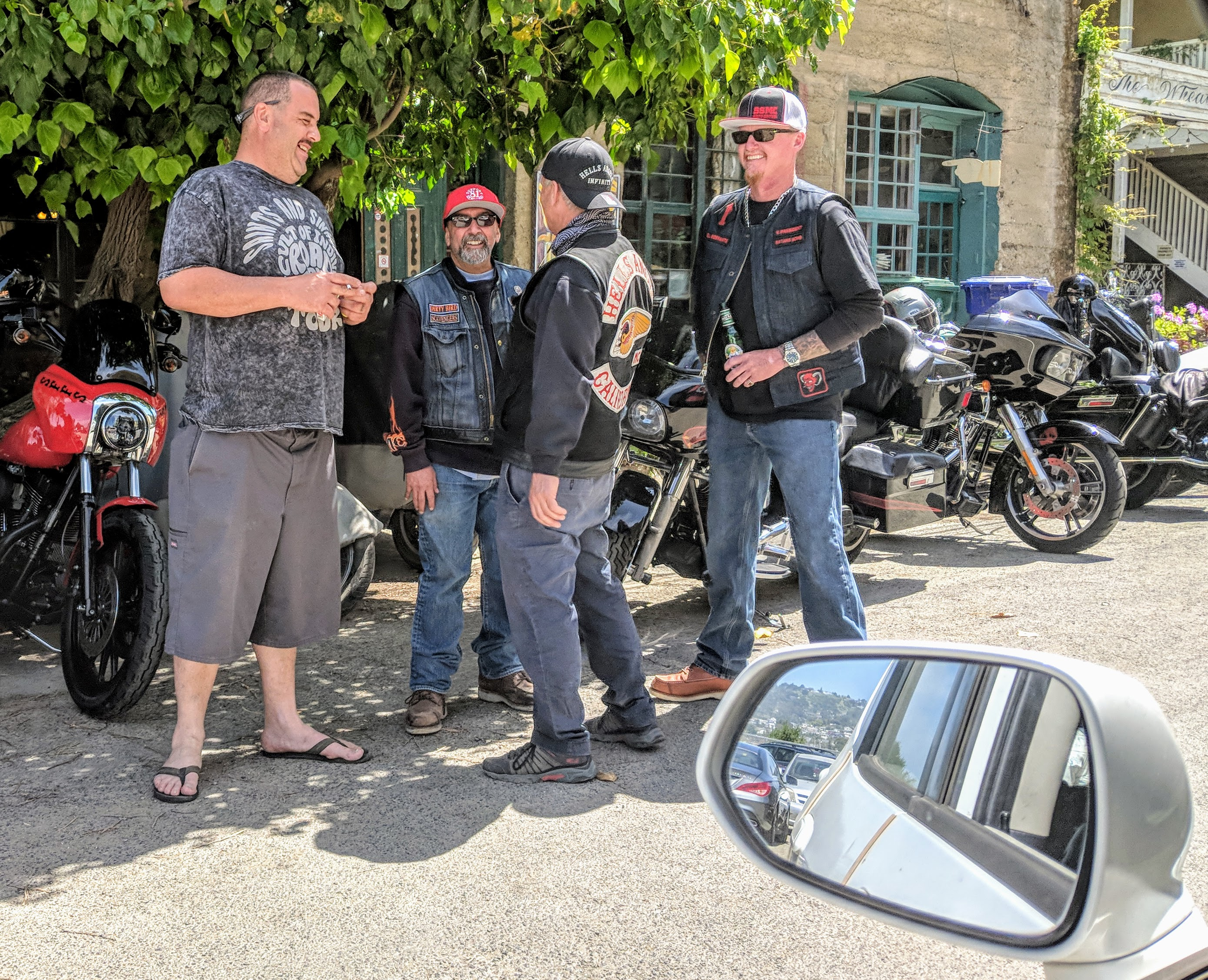
A member of the Hells Angels socializing with supporters

Hells Angels chapters often oversee smaller motorcycle clubs within their locality, known as support clubs or "puppet" clubs. These clubs serve as a potential source of recruitment and earnings for the Hells Angels, and, according to law enforcement, carry out crimes on the Hells Angels' behalf in order to shield the Hells Angels from scrutiny. The Hells Angels also use support clubs to establish an initial presence in an area before forming a full-fledged charter. Support clubs may be established for the sole purpose of providing assistance to the Hells Angels, or begin as independent clubs before coming under the Hells Angels' control. Such clubs may maintain relations with the Hells Angels for protection or to bolster their reputation. Members of puppet clubs attend Hells Angels events and associate with Hells Angels at gatherings. Puppet club members are also permitted to wear a diamond-shaped "81" patch on their vests, which indicates their adherence to the Hells Angels.

The Red Devils Motorcycle Club, a biker group with chapters in nearly 20 countries, is the official and most prominent support club of the Hells Angels. The Hells Angels have more than two dozen support clubs in Canada. In Norway, the Hells Angels have built up a network of support clubs over which they exert control and hold responsibility for administering three-piece back patches. The Hells Angels have also formed support groups, such as AK81 in Denmark and the Red & White Crew in Sweden, which consist of young males who do not own motorcycles.

=== Club mergers ===
Over the years, the Hells Angels have amalgamated a number of smaller outlaw motorcycle clubs in a process known as a "patch-over".

Hells Angels club mergers
Year	Location	Original Club/Charter	Hells Angels Charter	References
1967	United States	Animals MC; Gooses MC	Hells Angels Cleveland	
1969	United States	Aliens MC Nomads	Hells Angels New York City	
1969	United States	Hackers MC	Hells Angels Rochester	
1973	Germany	Bloody Devils MC	Hells Angels Hamburg	
1973	United States	Storm Troopers MC	Hells Angels Durham	
1975	United States	Grateful Dead MC	Hells Angels Bridgeport	
1976	United States	Tribulators MC	Hells Angels Charleston	
1977	Canada	Popeye MC	Hells Angels North (Montreal)	
1978	United States	Satan's Slaves MC	Hells Angels San Fernando Valley	
1978	United States	Tar Heel Stompers MC	Hells Angels Charlotte	
1978	Netherlands	Kreidler Ploeg Oost	Hells Angels Amsterdam	
1979	United States	Original Jokers MC	Hells Angels Winston-Salem	
1980	Netherlands	Mad Dogs	Hells Angels Haarlem	
1980	Denmark	Unionen MC	Hells Angels Copenhagen	
1982	Spain		Hells Angels Spain	
1982	United States	Grim Reapers MC Minneapolis	Hells Angels Minneapolis	
1982	United States	Brothers MC	Hells Angels Anchorage	
1983	Canada	Satan's Angels MC	Hells Angels Vancouver	
1984	Canada	13th Tribe MC	Hells Angels Halifax	
1984	Canada	Gitans MC	Hells Angels Sherbrooke	
1985	Denmark	Black Sheep MC	Hells Angels South (Helsingør)	
1990	Germany	Phoenix MC	Hells Angels Berlin	
1991	Canada	Satan's Guard MC	Hells Angels Trois-Rivières	
1992	Norway	Rowdies MC	Hells Angels Trondheim	
1992	Denmark	Nordstjernen MC	Hells Angels Aarhus	
1993	Sweden	Dirty Dräggels	Hells Angels Malmö	
1994	United States	Hell's Henchmen MC	Hells Angels Illinois; Hells Angels Indiana	
1996	Sweden	Rebels MC	Hells Angels Helsingborg	
1996	Finland	Overkill MC	Hells Angels Helsinki	
1996	Denmark	Mental Midgets MC	Hells Angels Odense	
1996	Norway	Customizers MC	Hells Angels Oslo	
1996	Norway	The Shabby Ones MC	Hells Angels Stavanger	
1996	Denmark	Avengers MC	Hells Angels Aalborg	
1997	Sweden	Choppers MC	Hells Angels Stockholm	
1997	Canada	Grim Reapers MC	Hells Angels Alberta	
1997	United States	Dirty Dozen MC	Hells Angels Arizona	
1998	Canada	Rebels MC	Hells Angels Saskatoon	
1999	Norway	Screwdrivers MC	Hells Angels Hamar	
1999	Sweden	Gamlestadens MC	Hells Angels Gothenburg	
2000	Canada	Los Bravos MC	Hells Angels Winnipeg	
2000	Canada	Last Chance MC; Lobos MC; Para-Dice Riders MC; Satan's Choice MC	Hells Angels Ontario	
2001	Denmark	Piraterne MC	Hells Angels Randers	
2002	United States	Brothers Fast MC	Hells Angels Denver	
2004	Canada	Bandidos MC Edmonton	Hells Angels Red Deer Nomads	
2015	United States	North Coast MC	Hells Angels Akron	

== Criminal activities and incidents ==
Various U.S. law enforcement agencies classify the Hells Angels as one of the "big four" motorcycle gangs, along with the Pagans, the Outlaws, and the Bandidos, and contend that members carry out widespread violent crime and organized crime, including drug dealing, trafficking in stolen goods, extortion, and prostitution operations. In Australia, the Hells Angels are included among the "big six", with the Bandidos, the Comanchero, the Finks, the Mongols, and the Rebels. All Hells Angels charters are autonomous and operate on their own. As such, some charters refrain from any illegal activity, while others operate as crime syndicates. Members of the organization have continuously asserted that they are only a group of motorcycle enthusiasts who have joined to ride motorcycles together, to organize social events such as group road trips, fundraisers, parties, and motorcycle rallies, and that any crimes are the responsibility of the people who carried them out, not the club as a whole.

In May 2019, a court in Utrecht issued a verdict that made the Netherlands the first country to completely ban the Hells Angels. The presiding judge called it "a danger to public order and the rule of law". Other countries such as Germany had banned local charters, but never the entire club. On July 15, 2022, the Supreme Court of the Netherlands reaffirmed the ban, making it permanent.

== See also ==
- List of outlaw motorcycle clubs

== Bibliography ==
- Hunter S. Thompson (1999). Hell's Angels: A Strange and Terrible Saga. Modern Library. ISBN 978-0-679-60331-3.
- Yves Lavigne (2000). Hell's Angels: Taking Care of Business. Random House of Canada, Limited. ISBN 978-0-7704-2858-7.
- Valerie Smart (2001). The Original Hell's Angels: 303rd Bombardment Group of World War II. Arcadia Publishing. ISBN 978-0-7385-0910-5.
- Cherry, Paul (2006). The Biker Trials: Bringing Down the Hells Angels. Toronto: ECW Press. ISBN 978-1550226386.
- Sher, Julian; Marsden, William (2006). Angels of Death: Inside the Bikers' Empire of Crime. Toronto: Alfred Knopf Canada. ISBN 9780307370327.
- Barker, Thomas (2007). Biker Gangs and Organized Crime. London: Routledge. ISBN 978-0323298704.
- Edward Winterhalder; Wil De Clercq (2008). The Assimilation: Rock Machine Become Bandidos: Bikers United Against the Hells Angels. ECW Press. ISBN 978-1-55490-321-4.
- Sonny Barger (2009). Hell's Angel: The Autobiography of Sonny Barger. HarperCollins. ISBN 978-0-06-184736-3.
- Jerry Langton (2009). Fallen Angel: The Unlikely Rise of Walter Stadnick and the Canadian Hells Angels. John Wiley & Sons. ISBN 978-0-470-73994-5.
- Sher, Julian; Marsden, William (2010). The Road to Hell: How the Biker Gangs are Conquering Canada. Knopf Canada. ISBN 978-0-307-36586-6.
- Yves Lavigne (2011). Hells Angels: Into the Abyss. HarperCollins Publishers Limited. ISBN 978-1-4434-0411-2.
- Yves Lavigne (2011). Hell's Angels at War. HarperCollins Publishers Limited. ISBN 978-1-4434-0410-5.
- Carter F. Smith (2017). Gangs and the Military: Gangsters, Bikers, and Terrorists with Military Training. Rowman & Littlefield. ISBN 978-1442275171.
