= Nam Angels =

- Directed by: Cirio H. Santiago
- Written by: Dan Gagliasso
- Produced by: Christopher R. Santiago
- Starring: Brad Johnson; Vernon Wells; Kevin Duffis; Rick Dean
- Cinematography: Ricardo Remias; Chris Squires
- Edited by: Edgardo Vinarao
- Music by: Jaime Fabregas
- Distributed by: Concorde-New Horizons
- Release date: 1989
- Running time: 91 minutes
- Country: Philippines
- Language: English

Nam Angels is a 1989 Philippine biker Vietnam war film directed by Cirio H. Santiago and written by Dan Gagliasso. The film was released in West Germany as Hell's Angels in Vietnam.

== Plot ==
During the Vietnam War an American patrol engages in a firefight with a strong force of NVA regulars. The Americans fight their way into a cave containing gold that is in the territory of aboriginals who kill the NVA as well as a few Americans, but capture the majority of the patrol with the exception of its leader, Lt. Vance Calhoun.

Calhoun beseeches his commanding general to allow him to return to the area to rescue his men, but the General explains they have no resources, and the area will be bombed by B-52s in a few days time. Aware that four Hells Angels bikers are visiting Vietnam and had have been arrested and had their motorcycles confiscated, Calhoun gets the General to allow him to release the Hell's Angels to be under his command to rescue his patrol. In exchange for their services, he offers the Angels a share of the gold but does not mention the prisoners.

After fighting their way through NVA held territory with the aid of friendly South Vietnamese, they discover the aborigines are led by a German named Chard who has remained in Indochina since his French Foreign Legion service. Chard plans to sell his American prisoners to the NVA.

== Cast ==
- Brad Johnson as Lt. Vance Calhoun
- Vernon Wells as Chard
- Mark Venturini as Bonelli
- Kevin Duffis as Hickman
- Rick Dean as Larger
- Jeff Griffith as Carmody
- Romy Diaz as Turko
- Ken Metcalfe as Gen. Donipha
- Archi Adamos as Trinh
- Eric Hahn as Morey

== Hells Angels lawsuit ==
On October 26, 1989, the Hells Angels Motorcycle Club filed a federal trademark infringement lawsuit in Los Angeles against Concorde-New Horizons, which produced Nam Angels, and against Media Home Entertainment, which distributed the film on video, over infringements on the club's registered trademarks. Hells Angels spokesman George Christie said: "There is absolutely no way our board or membership would have approved the portrayal of the Hells Angels in this movie. In fact, the portrayal of our members as disloyal to each other is totally contrary to the most important values of our organization – loyalty and trust". He further stated: "We have a structure in place for negotiating commercial licensing arrangements and we would be perfectly amenable to working with any enterprise interested in using Hells Angels trademarks within the guidelines we've established." Barry Fischer, the Hells Angels' Century City-based attorney who filed the suit, claimed: "I have never seen a movie where the trademark infringement was so pervasive. The most important thing to the Hells Angels is that the movie be stopped. I'm not saying the damages aren't important, but they are secondary to having the film pulled." A spokesman for Concorde-New Horizons responded that "the lawsuit is unfounded". The suit was ultimately settled out of court.
