= Silk Hope =

- Genre: Romance; Drama
- Based on: Silk Hope by Lawrence Naumoff
- Teleplay by: Dalene Young
- Story by: Beth Polson
- Directed by: Kevin Dowling
- Starring: Farrah Fawcett
- Music by: Alan Williams
- Country of origin: United States
- Original language: English

Production
- Executive producer: Beth Polson
- Producer: Erica Fox
- Cinematography: John Newby
- Editor: Janet Bartels-Vandagriff
- Running time: 92 minutes
- Production company: The Polson Company

Original release
- Network: CBS
- Release: October 20, 1999

Silk Hope is a 1999 made-for-TV romantic-drama film that starred Farrah Fawcett, along with Brad Johnson, Ashley Crow, and Scott Bryce.

== Plot ==
Frannie Vaughn (Fawcett) comes back home after being away a long time, only to find that her mother has died. She also finds out that her sister, Natalie (Crow) and her fiancé, Jake (Bryce), are planning to sell the acres once owned by Frannie and Natalie's family. To buy the land back from her sister, Frannie gets a job and falls in love with a fellow worker, Rubin (Johnson). In the end, Frannie's dreams come true and Natalie comes to her senses and moves into the old family house with Frannie and Rubin.

== Cast ==
- Farrah Fawcett as Frannie Vaughn
- Ashley Crow as Natalie
- Brad Johnson as Rubin
- Scott Bryce as Jake
- Herb Mitchell as Claude Osteen
- Debra Mooney as Violet
- Mark Lindsay Chapman as Ted Bass
- Diane Delano as Linda
- Kym Whitley as Grace
- Jan Hoag as Pig Farmer
