= Hells Angels MC criminal allegations and incidents in Ohio =

Numerous police and international intelligence agencies classify the Hells Angels Motorcycle Club (HAMC) as a motorcycle gang and contend that members carry out widespread violent crimes, including drug dealing, trafficking in stolen goods, gunrunning, extortion, and prostitution rings. Members of the organization have continuously asserted that they are only a group of motorcycle enthusiasts who have joined to ride motorcycles together, to organize social events such as group road trips, fundraisers, parties, and motorcycle rallies, and that any crimes are the responsibility of the individuals who carried them out and not the club as a whole.

The Hells Angels have established a presence in Northeast Ohio, with chapters in Akron, Cleveland, Lake County and Portage County. The first HAMC chapter in Ohio was chartered on December 16, 1967, when two clubs – the Gooses Motorcycle Club, founded in 1960, and the Animals Motorcycle Club – merged to form the Hells Angels' Cleveland faction, known as the "Dirty 30". Gabriel Baird of The Plain Dealer described the Gooses as "a motorcycle gang that would in retrospect seem like choirboys" compared the succeeding Hells Angels. The Cleveland charter was also the Hells Angels' first in the Midwestern United States.

The Cleveland chapter is influential in the club's national organization and is reputed to be the location of the national treasury. The Cleveland and New York City chapters also govern all Hells Angels activities in the Eastern United States as well as those of chapters in Canada and Europe. The Hells Angels are active in gunrunning, extortion, trafficking in stolen property and methamphetamine distribution in the Cleveland and Akron areas, and have been involved in contract killings and drug trafficking with the Cleveland crime family.

== Gang wars ==
=== God's Children ===
Headquartered out of a clubhouse in the city's St. Clair–Superior neighborhood, the Cleveland Hells Angels came into conflict with another biker gang, God's Children Motorcycle Club, soon after their foundation in 1967. The Hells Angels almost immediately declared war on God's Children, the gang claiming control over the area at the time. While in pursuit of God's Children bikers, on February 28, 1968, around a dozen Hells Angels and members of the affiliated Animals gang visited Barto's Café, a bar on the east side of Cleveland, where they shot and killed two patrons. Having found no members of God's Children, the Hells Angels instead targeted Roosevelt Brown, a black man. Brown was shot twice in the back as he tried to run into a kitchen behind the bar after being harassed by the Hells Angels, and James O. Tillett, a white man, was shot once in the head as he tried to intervene on Brown's behalf. Robert Williams, a piano player at the bar, was also assaulted by the bikers.

Two brothers were arrested, and two shotguns and a rifle were confiscated when police subsequently raided the nearby clubhouse of the Animals. The Hells Angels involved in the killings fled the state. Six fugitive Hells Angels members – Cleveland chapter president Timothy John "T.A." Adams, Nelson J. "Scotty" Blackburn, Donald A. Fraser, Robert G. "Bottles" Lemmons, Gary Leroy "Monkey" Montgomery and "Dirty" George Westley Rothrock – and two of their girlfriends – Kathy Diane Shaffer and Nellie M. Sideris – were charged with first-degree murder. A .38 caliber revolver used in the killing of Brown was recovered in a garage in Erie, Pennsylvania, where Adams and Montgomery had initially fled to, on March 2, 1968. The same day, Fraser and Shaffer were arrested in Kingman, Arizona. Animals member Donald Griswold also surrendered to police on March 6, 1968. On March 12, 1968, Blackburn, Lemmons, Rothrock and Sideris were captured by the New York State Police near Fonda, New York. The two remaining suspects, Adams and Montgomery, were apprehended by Federal Bureau of Investigation (FBI) agents and local police in Walnut Creek, California the following day. Three other Hells Angels – Donald A. "Doc" Edwards, Eugene F. "Meany" Zagar and Robert D. "Fly" Salerno – were additionally indicted on first-degree murder charges on March 21, 1968.

Murder charges were dismissed against Fraser, Shaffer and Sideris, who were held as material witnesses. Salerno was convicted of first-degree murder, Blackburn, Griswold and Lemmons of second-degree murder, and Adams of first-degree manslaughter. Blackburn was sentenced to serve two ten-years-to-life sentences, to run concurrently, and Lemmons and Griswold were sentenced to two consecutive life terms. On June 11, 1975, Governor of Ohio James A. Rhodes, acting on the unanimous recommendation of the state parole board, reduced the sentences of Blackburn and Lemmons to six- and seven-years-to-life, respectively. The pair were released from Marion Correctional Institution on parole shortly after. Blackburn left the Hells Angels in 1993 and died on October 27, 2011, at the age of 67.

=== The Breed ===
On the orders of Sonny Barger, Clarence "Butch" Crouch commanded the Cleveland Hells Angels in eliminating various local biker gangs in order to corner the methamphetamine market in the Cleveland area. By 1971, the Hells Angels had rid the local drug trade of all but one rival gang. The sole gang to resist the Hells Angels' intimidation and beatings was the Breed, a fledgling club at the time that had expanded into territory held by the Hells Angels in Akron and on the East Coast. The feud between the two clubs reportedly began after a fight in Philadelphia, Pennsylvania in 1969, and continued during the following two decades.

The Breed "came to Cleveland and put patches on about every little Honda rider, all over town", around 1970, according to Crouch. Although the Breed outnumbered the Hells Angels in the Cleveland area, their members were younger and less experienced than the Hells Angels, whose numbers included many Vietnam veterans. Ahead of a motorcycle trade show at the Polish Women's Hall in downtown Cleveland, the Hells Angels organized an ambush on the Breed after being informed by a policeman that the Breed were planning to attack the Angels in the hall. On March 6, 1971, Hells Angels members from Ohio, New York, Massachusetts and California initiated a large-scale brawl with members of the Breed, in which knives, chains and clubs were brandished. With over a hundred bikers on each side, the violence led to the deaths of five people—four Breed members and one Hells Angel. Breed members Bruce "Buster" Emerick, Andrew C. Demeter, Amelio "Pierre" Gardull and Thomas Allen Terry, and Hells Angels biker Jeffrey "Groover" Coffey were killed. 23 people were also injured, including three police officers. Breed members asserted that they were ambushed by the Hells Angels after attending the event unarmed, as ordered by their chapter officers.

84 people were arrested at the scene of the brawl. On March 9, 1971, 47 Breed members and ten Hells Angels were each charged with five counts of first-degree murder. Fourteen Hells Angels members ultimately pleaded guilty to manslaughter on October 19, 1971.

After the Polish Women's Hall attack, the Hells Angels took over the distribution of methamphetamine in the Greater Cleveland area. Inspired by The Godfather book by Mario Puzo, the Hells Angels who were incarcerated for manslaughter returned from prison with a philosophy based upon Mafia customs in which prospecting members must "roll their bones", or commit a murder on a target selected by the club, to become a "full patch" member.

=== Outlaws ===
In 1974, the Hells Angels declared war on the Outlaws, their biggest rival in the drug and vice trade. In order to fund the war, the Cleveland Hells Angels started a "Taking Care of Business" (TCB) fund which was used to finance a contract-killing program in which members traveled around the United States carrying out gang hits on the rivals of various chapters. During this era, each Hells Angels chapter also appointed an intelligence officer, who gathered information on rival gangs, law enforcement officers and newsmen.

In 1974, Hells Angels initiate Andrew Shission allegedly shot and killed Outlaws member Bruce Sunday while Sunday was riding his motorcycle on Interstate 77. The motorcycle crashed at high speed, resulting in Sunday's girlfriend, who was riding on the back, suffering serious injuries. Shission and five other Hells Angels were indicted for a series of murders, all but two of which occurred as a result of the club's war with the Outlaws, on June 10, 1982. Authorities at the time suspected the Hells Angels of responsibility in at least twenty homicides during a period of warfare between the HAMC and the Outlaws beginning in 1974. Clarence "Butch" Crouch, the Cleveland Hells Angels vice-president who became a government witness in November 1981, testified against Shission in an aggravated murder trial in 1983. The case against Shission was dismissed due to a lack of evidence to corroborate the testimony from Crouch.

The Hells Angels' Akron chapter was formed in February 1979 by James Patrick Caronite, president of the club's territories in the Eastern U.S. In December 1979, two Outlaws members armed with a silencer-equipped .22 caliber pistol and a sawed-off shotgun were arrested in a car by police near the Hells Angels' Akron clubhouse. Caronite was believed to be the target of the Outlaws' assassination team. Caronite had earlier been ordered by Sonny Barger and other senior Hells Angels to arrange a peace meeting with members of the Outlaws. The peace meeting, to be held in an eastern state, was in fact an opportunity for the Hells Angels to assassinate their rivals' leadership, according to investigators. Having gave his word to the Outlaws that they would be safe at the meeting, Caronite reportedly warned the Outlaws, who avoided the meeting, when he learned of the assassination plans. The warning reportedly angered the HAMC hierarchy.

Hells Angels Cleveland chapter member Jack "Jack-O-Lantern" Gentry was arrested on June 11, 1982, and charged with the murder of Outlaws member Ralph "Real Time" Tanner, who was shot twice and killed behind the Outlaws' Toledo chapter clubhouse on November 30, 1980. Gentry was one of six Hells Angels indicted for a series of murders, all but two of which stemmed for the club's conflict with the Outlaws, after a federal grand jury investigation of the HAMC's activities in Cleveland and Akron. Charged with aggravated murder, Gentry stood trial in Lucas County circuit court in October 1982. The trial was attended by HAMC members from across the country, including West Coast leader Sonny Barger and East Coast commander Sandy Alexander. A female juror was excused from duty after her son was threatened by a group of Hells Angels at a Downtown Toledo bar. Hells Angel-turned-government witness Clarence "Butch" Crouch testified that Gentry and other Cleveland Hells Angels had carried out recognizance missions on Outlaws targets in Toledo in the weeks leading up to Tanner's murder, for which Gentry was rewarded with initiation into the HAMC. Gentry was acquitted of all charges on October 29 after a four-day proceeding.

On November 23, 1981, the FBI raided a Hells Angels weapons cache located in a rented warehouse in Cleveland, discovering a large quantity of explosives and automatic firearms, including hand grenades, anti-tank rockets, a supply of dynamite, an M16 rifle, two submachine guns, shotguns and an automatic pistol. The arsenal was believed to be intended for use in the war against the Outlaws.

=== Coffin Cheaters ===
Four locations, including the Cleveland Hells Angels chapter headquarters, were raided by SWAT teams and federal agents on January 5, 2011 as arrest warrants were issued for club members Justin Selisker and Scott Stage. Stage was convicted on March 21, 2011 of felonious assault in the beating of Steven Keresztesi, a biker who was seeking to reestablish the defunct Coffin Cheaters Motorcycle Club in Northeast Ohio. Keresztesi was attacked after refusing to pay tribute to the Hells Angels at a meeting behind a restaurant in Montville Township on September 3, 2010. On June 11, 2011, Stage was sentenced to six years in prison. Seliskar was acquitted of assault charges on March 18, 2011.

=== Mongols ===
On July 25, 2020, Cleveland Hells Angels chapter member John Fuller was fatally shot and a Mongols member was stabbed and wounded after a brawl involving approximately ten bikers at a gas station in Valley View. Fuller's killer was arrested but was later released from police custody.

== Violent incidents ==
An eighteen-year-old woman was allegedly gang raped by Hells Angels members in Cleveland Heights in 1969.

In 1969, Cleveland Hells Angels chapter treasurer James M. "Beetle" Bailey, Jr. was acquitted of disturbing the peace after he was arrested in a house in Independence, where five rifles, a sawed-off shotgun, a revolver, a chain and a switchblade knife were discovered.

Hells Angels members Bradley Peterson and Dustin Wolf were arrested on misdemeanor assault charges after they were involved in a physical confrontation with off-duty Euclid police officer Todd Gauntner at a bar in Willoughby on August 24, 2018. Gauntner was charged with using a weapon while under intoxication for pointing a gun at the pair. After initially being placed on administrative leave on September 10 for violating police department rules, Gauntner was fired by Euclid Mayor Kirsten Holzheimer Gail seven days later after Euclid Police Department chief Scott Meyer recommended his termination.

Wolf and Peterson both pleaded guilty to aggravated disorderly conduct; they were each fined $200 and received a thirty-day suspended jail sentence. On November 29, 2018, Gauntner pleaded guilty to using weapons while intoxicated. He was sentenced to serve five days in jail. Gauntner, a U.S. Marine Corps veteran of the War in Afghanistan who suffered from suspected post-traumatic stress disorder, committed suicide in the lobby of the police station he was terminated from on March 23, 2020.

== Murders ==
=== Donald Della Serra ===
Three members of a Hells Angels hit team killed one man, Donald Della Serra, and wounded two others with a submachine gun and shotguns in a drive-by shooting in front of a house in Akron on June 9, 1974. Della Serra was not a member of a motorcycle gang. The intended target of the attack was Outlaws member Steven "Groundhog" Wargo, who previously lived at the residence. The crime went unsolved until Cleveland Hells Angels chapter vice president-turned-government witness Clarence "Butch" Crouch confessed to being one of the gunmen to federal agents on November 5, 1981. He named the other two shooters as Richard C. "Friz" Frazier and Enis "Eagle" Crnic, who died in April 1977. Crouch also implicated Hells Angels national treasurer Andrew Shission in the killing, and testified that Shission had provided the stolen car that was used in the shooting. Shission was acquitted of murder in Summit County on October 27, 1983. Crouch was convicted of manslaughter and sentenced to ten-to-forty years in prison.

=== Denise Padavick ===
On the night of October 24 or the early morning hours of October 25, 1974, Hells Angels member Thomas A. Padavick shot and killed his wife Denise Padavick (née Wagner) at his Cleveland home. Denise Padavick's body was discovered on June 5, 1976, buried in a 55-gallon oil drum in Brecksville. Thomas Padavick was one of six Hells Angels members indicted for a series of murders on June 10, 1982, as the result of a federal grand jury investigation of the club's activities in Cleveland and Akron. Cleveland Hells Angels chapter vice president Clarence "Butch" Crouch, who turned government witness in November 1981, testified that he witnessed Thomas shoot Denise in the head during an argument. Thomas Padavick was convicted of his wife's murder on June 25, 1986, and sentenced to fifteen years-to-life in prison.

=== Sigley home bombing ===
At a party celebrating the first anniversary of his ascension to "full patch" member, Cleveland Hells Angel Harry" Chakirelis was reminded that he had not yet "rolled his bones", putting him under pressure to commit his first contract killing for the club. On January 7, 1975, three people – Burdell M. Offitt, Maryanne Sigley and Sigley's two-year-old son, Christopher Michael Sigley – were killed and another three others – John and Deborah Slepko, and nine-month-old Steve Sigley – were critically injured by a suitcase bomb that exploded inside the home of William Sigley, who was absent, in Cleveland's Slavic Village neighborhood. The explosive had been left on the porch of the house and was taken inside by Offitt, a visitor to the home. Cleveland HAMC chapter vice president-turned government witness Clarence "Butch" Crouch later testified that two fellow Hells Angels, chapter treasurer Richard A. Amato and Harold L. "Harry" Chakirelis, carried out the bombing in the mistaken belief that the house was occupied by a member of the rival Outlaws.

Amato and Chakirelis were among six Hells Angels members indicted for a series of unsolved murders, some stemming from the conflict between the HAMC and the Outlaws, on June 10, 1982. Amato was charged with three counts of aggravated murder and three counts of attempted murder, while Chakirelis was charged with a single murder count. The indictments were the result of a federal grand jury investigation of the Hells Angels' activities in Cleveland and Akron. An aggravated murder case against Amato was dismissed on November 8, 1983, by judge James J. McGettrick, who deemed four days of testimony insufficient to prove the prosecutor's case. Deborah Slepko, who spent eleven months in hospital, was blinded in one eye and lost hearing, testified in the trial. The dismissal of the Amato case led prosecutors on November 28, 1983, to also withdraw the case against Chakirelis. Chakirelis died at the age of seventy-six on June 11, 2019.

=== George Rothrock ===
Hells Angels member "Dirty" George Westley Rothrock was shot and killed with a .38 caliber handgun by his girlfriend Mary Jane Jarus after he had hit her with a telephone and choked her unconscious at their Cleveland home on November 2, 1981. Rothrock's funeral in Mentor on November 6 was attended by local and national Hells Angels. The shooting was ruled justifiable. Jarus later entered the Federal Witness Protection Program and testified against another club member, Carl Lee Wortman, in a weapons possession trial in June 1984.

=== David Hartlaub ===
On February 27, 1988, music store manager David Hartlaub was fatally shot thirteen times in his van at a bank parking lot in Perkins Township, as he was making a nightly cash deposit, by Hells Angels "prospect" John Ray Bonds, who sustained an arm wound from a bullet ricochet. Bonds fled in the van, which he abandoned nearby. Both the van's interior and the murder weapon, a MAC-11 9 mm caliber semi-automatic pistol fitted with a homemade silencer, were spattered with Bonds' blood. The deposit bag, containing approximately $4,000, was not taken. Douglas Waratuke, a music store employee who had followed Hartlaub to the bank in a separate vehicle, was threatened at gunpoint by "full patch" Hells Angels member Steven Wayne Yee, who then fled on foot. Another "prospect", Mark Verdi, acted as a getaway driver and drove Bonds and Yee from the scene in a car registered to Yee. Hartlaub was killed by the Hells Angels assassination team after being mistaken for a member of the Sandusky Outlaws chapter who drove an almost identical yellow van. The killing was planned in retaliation for the September 18, 1987 Joliet, Illinois shooting and wounding of Cleveland HAMC chapter president Kenneth "Kenny" Yates, at which Bonds had been present.

A March 9, 1988 search of Verdi's home in connection with an unrelated crime uncovered several items believed to be evidence of the murder, including a map, plastic bags and rolls of electrical tape of the types used to create a device to collect cartridges which was secured to the murder weapon, and several firearms. Despite the serial number on the murder weapon being obliterated, the FBI were able to trace its origin. The gun had previously been owned by a former roommate of Yee, who had owned two such weapons and testified that they had been stolen from his car when it was parked outside their apartment. Spent shell casings which experts later determined came from the murder weapon were found in Yee's car, which was tracked down days later. Fibers found in the car also matched fibers from a glove found three weeks after the murder on the side of Route 2 connecting Cleveland and Sandusky. Discovered along with the glove was Hartlaub's van registration and title, an empty box of 9 mm cartridges of the type used in the murder and found in Yee's car, and a loaded revolver. Bonds was identified as the shooter who had hid inside Hartlaub's van as a result of DNA evidence found at the murder scene and in Yee's car. The trio were subsequently indicted. Verdi and Yee were taken into custody on March 7, 1989, but Bonds fled before he could be brought to trial; he was a fugitive for eight months before being apprehended on November 8, 1989, when a patron at a bar in Paducah, Kentucky alerted law enforcement of his whereabouts. Authorities had earlier had him profiled on a nationally televised crime show that summer.

Bonds, Verdi and Yee were convicted of federal weapons violations at the U.S. District Court in Toledo on February 22, 1991. On June 21, Verdi and Yee were sentenced to fifteen years' imprisonment, and Bonds was sentenced to twenty five years'. All three men later pleaded guilty in state court to aggravated murder. This was one of the first cases of DNA being used for criminal conviction. Yee and Verdi were sentenced to an additional twenty years-to-life, while Bonds was given thirty years-to-life. Bonds' murder trial was delayed after he was stabbed several times in prison on January 10, 1992. Yee filed multiple appeals in a failed attempt to remove his guilty plea, and also unsuccessfully requested resentencing. The case was the subject of "The Initiation", episode ten of season five of the documentary series The FBI Files, which originally aired on June 17, 2003.

=== Contract killing ===
Due to the club's rule that a new member must "roll his bones", or commit a contract killing, the Cleveland Hells Angels became prominent contract killers in the 1970s. The Cleveland Hells Angels became the preeminent hitmen for various Hells Angels chapters across the United States.

==== Cleveland mob war ====
The Hells Angels were retained as contract killers by both factions involved in the Cleveland mob war of 1975–78, in which the Cleveland crime family feuded with Irish gangster Danny Greene and his Celtic Club for control of criminal rackets in the city. There were almost forty car bombings in Cleveland during this time period, earning the city the unofficial title of "Bomb City U.S.A.". HAMC members were allegedly rewarded by the Mafia with Iron Workers' Union membership as payment for services rendered, and eventually were used as strikebreakers at a construction site in eastern Ohio.

Celtic Club lieutenant Kevin McTaggert informed the FBI that Hells Angels member Enis "Eagle" Crnic was contracted by Greene for a fee of $7,500 to kill Shondor Birns, a rival racketeer and Mafia ally who was assassinated via a car bomb containing C-4 explosive on March 29, 1975. Crnic and Greene were also suspected in the attempted murder of Mafia enforcer Eugene "The Animal" Ciasullo, who survived the bombing of his home on July 21, 1976. Another club member, George Rothrock, is also believed to have been involved in bombings. Crnic was killed while attempting to attach a car bomb to a vehicle belonging to Cleveland crime family associate John "Johnny Del" Delzoppo on April 5, 1977. It was never determined if Crnic accidentally set off the bomb prematurely or if his accomplice in the car seen driving away from the scene had himself detonated the explosive. Allegedly, Greene killed Crnic because of his clandestine knowledge of bombings against Greene's rivals. Due to the Hells Angels' working relationship with the Mafia, Cleveland crime family boss James "Jack White" Licavoli and his administration were greatly angered by Crnic's involvement in the bombings.

Hells Angels member Frank R. Fencl allegedly carried out the July 6, 1978 murder of mobster Joseph F. "Joey Bugs" Bonarrigo under contract with the Mafia. According to testimony given by Cleveland crime family underboss-turned-government witness Angelo "Big Ange" Lonardo before the U.S. Senate Permanent Subcommittee on Investigations on April 15, 1988, Mafia soldier Thomas "The Chinaman" Sinito had informed Lonardo and Licavoli of a murder threat against the pair by Bonarrigo, and was subsequently given permission to contract for Bonarrigo's killing. Joseph "Joe Loose" Iacobacci, an associate at the time who later became boss of the Cleveland crime family, was tasked with overseeing the murder and recruited a Hells Angel for assistance. After later learning that Sinito was involved in the narcotics trade, however, Lonardo developed the belief that Sinito had actually manufactured a reason to eliminate Bonarrigo as a drug rival rather than because of any legitimate threat to the family's leadership. Fencl was arrested and charged with Bonarrigo's murder on June 10, 1982, as he and five other Hells Angels were indicted for a series of homicides following a federal grand jury investigation of the HAMC's activities in Cleveland and Akron. He was scheduled to stand trial in September 1984 before judge James J. McGettrick. However, McGettrick was arrested on April 13, 1984, after accepting a $5,000 bribe to fix Fencl's upcoming trial from a Bureau of Alcohol, Tobacco, Firearms and Explosives (ATF) agent posing as a Hells Angels associate.

==== ATF agent contract ====
In late 1982, law enforcement officers received information that the Cleveland Hells Angels chapter had issued a contract for the murder of a Cleveland ATF agent who had been involved in the investigation of several murders allegedly committed by members of the club. The information came from a confidential source in great detail, including where the killing would take place. The people planning these events knew the agent was going to fly to a particular location and then drive from that location to a law enforcement seminar in a nearby locality. Contact was made with the agent involved, and it was confirmed that he was going to go to the law enforcement seminar on the dates specified by the informant via the route specified by the informant. This information was not public knowledge. The agent altered his travel plans after being informed of the assassination plot.

==== Casalicchio case ====
Joseph S. "Joe" Casalicchio contracted two California Hells Angels members for a fee of $35,000 to assassinate Cuyahoga County Common Pleas judge Kathleen Ann Sutula, who had sentenced Casalicchio to thirty-three months' imprisonment for a drug conviction on February 27, 2001. The two unidentified bikers carried out a failed assassination attempt on April 28, 2001, when Sutula's home in Seven Hills was the object of gunfire. While in the Marion Correctional Institution in April 2002, Casalicchio told another inmate, James Giminez, that he had hired hitmen kill Sutula but that the murder attempt had failed. On April 5, 2002, Giminez wrote a letter to Sutula, informing her of the Casalicchio's statements. Sutula forwarded the letter to the Cuyahoga County Sheriff's Office. Casalicchio appealed his conviction, which was affirmed by the court on February 14, 2002. The case was, however, remanded for a new sentencing hearing. Sutula resentenced Casalicchio to the same sentence of thirty-three months in November 2002, and he was assigned to Grafton Correctional Institution to serve his sentence. On April 28, 2003, the Sheriff's Office placed an informant, Videll Schumpert, in the prison with Casalicchio. Schumpert was wired and taped conversations between the pair, during which Casalicchio admitted paying the Hells Angels to assassinate the judge, but that they had failed to carry out the assignment. Casalicchio also stated his belief that if Sutula were dead, he would have received a lesser sentence from another judge. He was indicted on charges of conspiracy to commit murder, attempted murder, felonious assault, retaliation, and intimidation on October 16, 2003. On March 10, 2004, Casalicchio was convicted of intimidation and acquitted of the remaining charges. He was sentenced to five years of incarceration. Casalicchio died at the age of seventy-two in Ravenna on November 18, 2019.

== Infighting ==
Cleveland Hells Angels chapter members James Bailey and Richard Vesey were shot by at least two gunmen who were hidden in an embankment beneath an overpass on Interstate 80 near Colfax, Iowa as they travelled via motorcycle to the club's annual rally in Yankton, South Dakota on August 14, 1975. Bailey was killed after being shot in the neck, and Vesey was wounded in the arm. A third biker, Paul "Chip" Philemon of the North Carolina chapter, escaped unscathed. According to police, one assailant fired a shotgun and another a .38 caliber or .357 Magnum revolver. No motive was established for the shooting and no suspects were apprehended. Bailey's murder remains a cold case. Philemon was murdered at Bailey's funeral in Cleveland after the phone number of a member of the Outlaws was allegedly found in his wallet. After turning government witness in November 1981, Cleveland Hells Angels chapter vice president Clarence "Butch" Crouch testified that, before his death, chapter treasurer Bailey was building evidence of financial fraud against other members using receipts he had accumulated and kept in his wallet, and that Bailey was killed by HAMC officers in order to prevent him handing over the receipts to senior Hells Angels at the national meeting.

Clyde S. Trent, president of the Hells Angels' Akron chapter between 1989 and 1990, survived two alleged assassination attempts during that time period. A bomb placed in the driveway of Trent's home in August 1990 failed to detonate. In December 1990, he was shot twice with a 9 mm handgun as he sat in a car a near the Cleveland HAMC chapter clubhouse. Trent identified another club member as his assailant, but declined to press charges. The Akron chapter disbanded in 1991 as a result of internal feuds, indictments and leadership issues. The chapter's three remaining members subsequently transferred to other Hells Angels factions. The Cleveland chapter, once considered among the club's most powerful in the United States, had also fallen into disarray by this point.

== Corruption of law enforcement and the judiciary ==
In 1977, Cleveland Division of Police (CDP) patrolman Steven D. Stevers was convicted of bribery after being accused of aiding six Hells Angels members who had been charged with the gang rape of a woman, by passing $1,000 and an airline ticket to the victim on behalf of the bikers. While Stevers was sentenced to prison, the charges against the Hells Angels were dismissed.

During a meeting with undercover ATF agent Stephen Wells, who was posing as a Hells Angels associate, at a Rocky River restaurant in April 1984, Cuyahoga County Common Pleas Court Judge James J. McGettrick admitted that he had accepted bribes to prearrange the outcomes in two cases where the defendants were members of the Hells Angels. He had received $6,900 to dismiss murder charges against Richard Amato and Harry Chakirelis in the 1975 Sidgley home bombing, which killed three people. On April 12, 1984, Wells, while wearing a wire, paid the judge an additional $5,000 in marked bills to determine an upcoming murder case against Hells Angels member Frank Fencl.

McGettrick was arrested the following day, and the marked bills as well as other money that was traced to the Hells Angels and newspaper articles about the fixed cases were subsequently recovered from his home. $13,800 in cash of unknown origin was also seized from McGettrick's safety deposit box at a bank in Rocky River. He pleaded no contest to the charges of soliciting one bribe and of receiving two bribes totaling $15,900 in exchange for fixing murder charges against Fencl and Amato, but was found guilty by Hamilton County Common Pleas judge Simon L. Leis, Jr., who was assigned to hear the case as a visiting judge, on January 16, 1985. Defense motions to find McGettrick, who was terminally ill with prostate and bone cancer, incompetent to stand trial and to suppress key evidence in the case were denied by Leis. On February 8, 1985, McGettrick was sentenced to four years in prison and fined $15,000. The bribery conviction was affirmed on appeal. McGttrick died on July 17, 1985 at the age of 68.

== Robbery ==
Akron HAMC chapter member Joel Arden Parsons was sentenced to a term of imprisonment after he and another man were convicted for the robbery of a gas station in Coventry Township in 1980. Summit County Sheriff's Office detectives believe the pair were also responsible for five other gas station robberies. Parsons was sentenced to an additional ten-to-fifty-five years in prison in October 1989 for weapons charges and violating his parole on the armed robbery conviction. He died at the age of fifty on October 29, 2007.

== Drug trafficking ==
Arrests were made in Cleveland on May 2, 1985 in connection with Operation Roughrider, a three-year FBI investigation into the Hells Angels that culminated with the arrests of a total of 133 club members and associates on drug trafficking and racketeering charges during a series of coordinated raids carried out in eleven states. The raids, involving over a thousand law enforcement personnel, also led to the seizure of cocaine, marijuana, methamphetamine, hashish, PCP and LSD valued at $2 million, as well as weapons including submachine guns and anti-tank weaponry. Undercover FBI agent Kevin P. Bonner infiltrated the HAMC for twenty-six months and made narcotics transactions with members of eleven chapters across the country as part of the investigation.

Patricia M. Long, an associate of the Akron Hells Angels, was arrested in 1989 after selling methamphetamine to an undercover police officer. A subsequent search of her Springfield Township home resulted in the seizure of a pound of the drug, valued at approximately $35,000. Long was convicted of drug trafficking and sentenced to five-to-twenty-five years in prison.
