= Brad Johnson (actor, born 1959) =

American actor (1959–2022)

- Born: October 24, 1959; Tucson, Arizona, U.S.
- Died: February 18, 2022 (aged 62); Fort Worth, Texas, U.S.
- Occupations: Actor, model
- Years active: 1986–2008, 2015
- Children: 8

Brad William Johnson (October 24, 1959 – February 18, 2022) was an American actor and former Marlboro Man, best known for his roles in films and television series during the late 1980s and 1990s. He gained prominence for his performances in Westerns and action-adventure films.

== Biography ==
=== Early life ===
Johnson was born in Tucson, Arizona, the son of Grove and Virginia Johnson. The family moved to Grants Pass, Oregon, and later, Dallas, Texas, where Johnson graduated high school in 1977. After competing in rodeos as a youth, he began his professional rodeo career in 1984 and was discovered by a movie scout looking for cowboys to star in a beer commercial. This led to his stint as the Marlboro Man and modeling gigs for Calvin Klein before he started acting. His first role was in a 1986 episode of the CBS soap opera Dallas.

=== Acting career ===
==== Film roles ====
Within five months of his arrival in Hollywood, Roger Corman cast him to star in the low-budget biker film Nam Angels, his first film role. His theatrical film debut came in 1989 when he starred in Always, a romantic drama directed by Steven Spielberg. In the film, Johnson portrayed Ted Baker, a pilot and love interest to Holly Hunter's character, alongside Richard Dreyfuss and John Goodman. His performance in Always earned him widespread recognition with critics comparing him to John Wayne, Clint Eastwood, and James Stewart.

In 1991, Johnson starred in Flight of the Intruder, a Vietnam War action film directed by John Milius where he played Lt. Jake "Cool Hand" Grafton, a naval aviator. His co-stars included Willem Dafoe and Danny Glover.

Other films included Philadelphia Experiment II, The Birds II: Land's End, Copperhead and Supergator.

One of his most notable roles came in the early 2000s when he starred in the Left Behind film series, based on the bestselling Christian apocalyptic novels of the same name. Johnson played Rayford Steele, a pilot caught amid a global crisis following the biblical Rapture. He appeared in three films of the Left Behind franchise, released between 2000 and 2005.

==== Television roles ====
In addition to his film work, Johnson appeared in several television series and made-for-TV movies. In 1996, he had a recurring role as Dr. Dominick O'Malley in the hit primetime soap opera Melrose Place. In 1997, Johnson portrayed Henry Nash in Rough Riders, a TV miniseries directed by John Milius about Theodore Roosevelt and the Rough Riders cavalry unit during the Spanish-American War.

Johnson played the lead character Major Matthew Sheppard in the syndicated action drama series Soldier of Fortune, Inc. for two seasons and thirty-seven episodes from 1997 to 1999. His co-stars included Melinda Clarke and Dennis Rodman.

Throughout his television career, Johnson often appeared in Westerns and military-themed projects, which aligned with his rugged, all-American image cultivated from his Marlboro Man modeling days.

== Personal life ==
Johnson was married to his wife Laurie, a former model, for 35 years. They had eight children Shane, Bellamy, Rachel, Eliana, Eden, Rebekah, Annabeth, and William.

His work as an actor and as a Marlboro Man — one of a succession used by the brand — brought Johnson and his wife to California. They eventually moved their family to a ranch in New Mexico and the Colorado mountains before settling in North Texas. Johnson restored old Winchester Model 1886 rifles before turning to selling ranch real estate in North Texas.

Johnson retired from acting and became a real estate agent. In 2014, he established Johnson Land and Home, LLC, a family-owned business with over 25 years of experience in investment, acquisition, marketing, and development of luxury and destination properties, as well as ranch, hunting, and recreational land.

== Death ==
Johnson died from complications of COVID-19 in Fort Worth, on February 18, 2022, at age 62. His death was publicly announced four months later by his former agent Linda McAlister.

== Partial filmography ==
- 1986 Dallas as Unknown
- 1989 Nam Angels as Calhoun
- 1989 Always as Ted Baker
- 1991 Flight of the Intruder as Lieutenant Jake "Cool Hand" Grafton
- 1992 An American Story as Major George Meade
- 1992 Sketch Artist as Peter
- 1993 Philadelphia Experiment II as David Herdeg
- 1994 The Birds II: Land's End as Ted Hocken
- 1994 Cries Unheard: The Donna Yaklich Story as Dennis Yaklich
- 1995 Dominion as Harris
- 1997 Soldier of Fortune, Inc. as Major Matthew Quentin Shepherd
- 1997 Rough Riders as Henry Nash
- 1999 Silk Hope as Rubin
- 2000 Across the Line as Sheriff Grant Johnson
- 2000 Left Behind as Captain Rayford Steele
- 2001 Crossfire Trail as Beau Dorn
- 2001 CSI as Paul Newsome, District Engineer (3 episodes)
- 2002 Left Behind II: Tribulation Force as Captain Rayford Steele
- 2003 Riverworld as Jeff Hale
- 2004 The Robinsons: Lost in Space as John Robinson (Unsold pilot)
- 2005 Wild Things: Diamonds in the Rough as Jay Clifton
- 2005 Alien Siege as Dr. Stephen Chase
- 2005 Left Behind: World at War as Captain Rayford Steele
- 2007 Safe Harbour as Matt Bowles
- 2007 Supergator as Professor Scott Kinney
- 2008 Copperhead as Bill "Wild Bill" Longley
- 2008 Comanche Moon (2008, TV Mini-Series) as Colonel Tom Soult
- 2015 Nail 32 as Old Jasper "Buck" Livingston
