= Martin Spottl =

American film director, producer, and screenwriter

- Born: The Bronx, New York, U.S.
- Education: Dartmouth College (BA, 1987)
- Occupations: Film director, producer, screenwriter
- Known for: Across the Line (2000)

Martin Spottl is an American film director, producer, and screenwriter.

== Early life ==
Spottl was born in the Bronx, New York, and graduated from Dartmouth College with the class of 1987.

== Career ==
Spottl's feature directing debut was reported by Variety in 1998, which noted that actor Martin Sheen had signed on for a supporting role in Across the Line, written by Sigal Erez and Spottl (produced by Brian Duncan and Randall Emmett) and described as a suspense thriller set on the Texas border in which a small-town sheriff uncovers a major drug-smuggling scandal involving the U.S. Border Patrol. Dartmouth Alumni Magazine reported around the same time that Spottl and classmate Brian Duncan '88 had formed the production company High Water Films to make the picture, with actors Tom Berenger and Martin Sheen then attached, though neither appeared in the finished film.

Spottl wrote, directed, and co-produced the finished feature, Across the Line (2000), starring Brad Johnson, Sigal Erez, Brian Bloom, and Adrienne Barbeau. The film premiered at the San Diego Latino Film Festival in Chula Vista, California, seven miles from the U.S.–Mexico border.

Ahead of that premiere, La Opinión ran a front-page Entertainment-section interview with Spottl and co-writer/star Sigal Erez about the film's approach to its subject, undocumented immigration. Spottl described the film as "no...un filme con solamente dos dimensiones (blanco-negro)" ("not a film with only two dimensions, black and white"), saying its story carried many dramatic and emotional nuances and that he and Erez had deliberately avoided treating the subject of immigration too simplistically. Erez, in the same interview, said their aim was to put a human face on the statistics surrounding immigration rather than treat migrants as an anonymous list of numbers.

Spottl also wrote and directed Stones in My Passway: The Robert Johnson Story, a biographical film about blues musician Robert Johnson.

== Filmography ==
Year	Title	Director	Writer	Producer	Notes
1990s	Stones in My Passway: The Robert Johnson Story	Yes	Yes		
2000	Across the Line	Yes	Yes	Yes	Feature directorial debut
