= Legend of the Phantom Rider =

- Directed by: Alex Erkiletian
- Screenplay by: Robert Ray
- Produced by: Alex Erkiletian
- Starring: Denise Crosby; Stefan Gierasch; Robert McRay; Zen Gesner; Angus Scrimm
- Cinematography: John Roy Morgan
- Edited by: Hans Rodionoff; Reed Buckles
- Music by: Lee Montgomery
- Production companies: Rolle's Range Farm Productions; Seed Productions
- Distributed by: A-Mark Entertainment
- Release dates: July 30, 2002 (München Fantasy Filmfest); February 11, 2003 (United States)
- Running time: 91 minutes
- Country: United States
- Language: English
- Budget: $1.6 million (estimated)

Legend of the Phantom Rider is a 2002 American horror Western film directed and produced by Alex Erkiletian and stars Denise Crosby and Robert McRay. It was made in the area of Old Tucson, Arizona. Its budget was estimated to be $1.6 million.

== Plot ==
A woman (Denise Crosby), is raped and her husband and son murdered by 'Blade' (Robert McRay) and his men on the range. She goes to the nearest town for help. But the gang also have it in a vise-like grip and the inhabitants will not assist until a non-speaking stranger confronts the men. In a series of gun battles, Pelgidium (also played by Robert McRay), whittles them down until just two of them support Blade against the man with the disfigured face and mysterious past.

== Cast ==
Actor	Role
Denise Crosby	Sarah Jenkins
Robert McRay	Blade / Pelgidium
Stefan Gierasch	Nathan
Zen Gesner	'Suicide'
Angus Scrimm	Preacher
George Murdock	The Judge
Rance Howard	Doc Fisher
Scott Eberlein	Danny
Jamie McShane	Victor
Robert Peters	Joey
Saginaw Grant	Medicine Man
Irwin Keyes	'Bigfoot'
Juli Erickson	Jane
John Henry Walker	'Peanut'
G. Larry Butler	John Berman

== Release ==
=== Home media ===
The film was released on DVD by MTI Home Video on February 11, 2003.

== Reception ==
Robert Pardi from TV Guide rated the film two out of four stars, writing, "Though this offbeat ghost story/Western hybrid would have benefited from sharper editing and a director with a surer command of suspense set-ups, it's an interesting variation on two sets of familiar themes." Rotten Tomatoes gives it a 50% rating.
