= Sigal Erez =

American actress

Sigal Erez is a screenwriter, director, and film producer, based in Los Angeles. She wrote, co-produced, and starred in the 2000 film Across the Line and later wrote, directed, and produced the short films What’s Your Number? and L.A. Dreaming. She also directed, co-wrote, and produced the 2024 mystical thriller Serial Beauty.

== Biography ==
Sigal Erez was born into a Moroccan/Jewish family. Sigal moved to the United States to complete the Lee Strasberg full program in New York. She was later accepted to the UCLA Writer's Program for a master's degree in screenwriting. In 2000, Sigal wrote, co-produced, and played the lead role of Miranda, an illegal immigrant from Guatemala, in the border thriller Across the Line. The film won the Silver Award at the WorldFest-Houston International Film Festival, and opened the San Diego Latino Film Festival.
