= Across the Line (2000 film) =

2000 film

- Directed by: Martin Spottl
- Written by: Martin Spottl; Sigal Erez
- Produced by: Brian Duncan; Martin Spottl; Sigal Erez
- Starring: Brad Johnson; Sigal Erez; Brian Bloom with Adrienne Barbeau and J. C. Quinn
- Cinematography: Maximo Munzi
- Edited by: Ivan Ladizinsky
- Music by: Charlie Daniels
- Production company: High Water Films
- Distributed by: Lionsgate (North America)
- Release date: March 7, 2000 (U.S.)
- Running time: 100 min.
- Country: United States
- Language: English

Across the Line is a 2000 American Neo-Western film directed by Martin Spottl and starring Brad Johnson and Sigal Erez. Johnson plays a small-town Texas sheriff who falls for a Latina refugee (Erez) who witnessed a murder on the Mexican border. Across the Line portrays refugees in a generally positive light and dramatizes their motivations and problems from a sympathetic point of view. In La Opinion Juan Rodriguez Flores wrote, "The film Across the Line isn't just about the difficulties of crossing illegally into the United States, but it also reflects the tragedy of hundreds of people who are forced to leave their families for the "promised land." Some critics praised the film for its emotional intensity, authenticity, and integrity, but others questioned it for turning the plight of illegal immigrants into mainstream entertainment. Independently financed and produced, Across the Line was distributed by Lionsgate Entertainment and remains widely available on streaming outlets including Tubi TV and Amazon Prime.

== Plot ==
A small-town sheriff falls in love with a Latina refugee who witnessed a murder on the Texas border.

== Cast ==
- Brad Johnson as Sheriff Grant Johnson
- Sigal Erez as Miranda
- Brian Bloom as Walt
- Adrienne Barbeau as Mrs. Randall
- J. C. Quinn as Harmon
- Marshall Teague as Ty Parker Johnson
- Justin Urich as Billy
- Julio Dolce Vita as Jesus

== Soundtrack ==
Charlie Daniels composed and performed the original score, including the title track, Across the Line, which he subsequently released on his 2000 album Road Dogs.

== Development ==
Martin Sheen was originally cast to play the role of Harmon, the compassionate diner owner.
