= Saginaw Grant =

Native American actor (1936–2021)

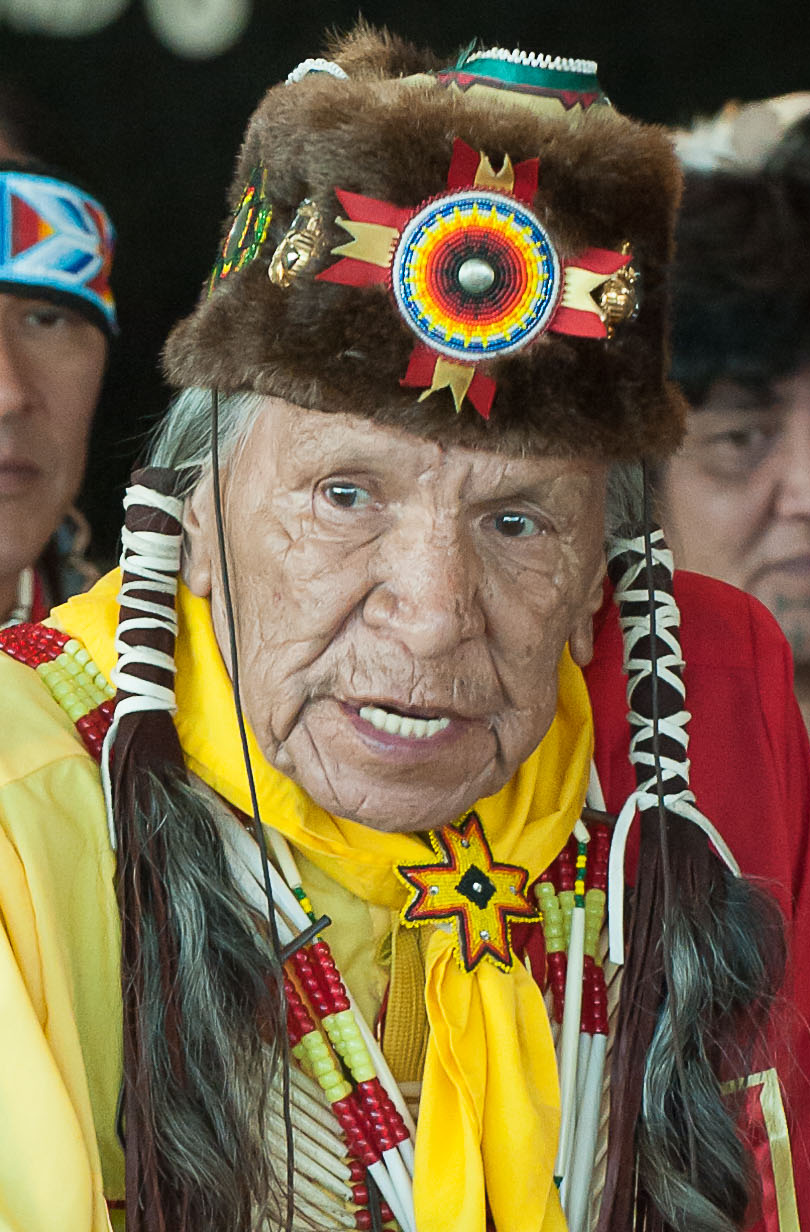
- Grant in 2015
- Born: Saginaw Morgan Grant; July 20, 1936; Pawnee, Oklahoma, U.S.
- Died: July 27, 2021 (aged 85); Los Angeles, California, U.S.
- Citizenship: Sac and Fox Nation • American
- Occupations: Actor, dancer, motivational speaker
- Years active: 1988–2016

Saginaw Morgan Grant (July 20, 1936 – July 27, 2021) was a Native American character actor. He appeared in The Lone Ranger, The World's Fastest Indian, Community, and Breaking Bad and was a musician, powwow dancer, motivational speaker and the Hereditary Chief of the Sac and Fox Nation.

== Early life ==
Saginaw Morgan Grant was born at the Indian Hospital in Pawnee, Oklahoma on July 20, 1936, the son of Sarah (née Murray) and Austin Grant. He was a member of the Sac and Fox Nation of Oklahoma. His mother's ancestry was from the Iowa and Otoe-Missouria tribes of Oklahoma. He was a United States Marine Corps veteran of the Korean War.

== Career ==
Grant appeared in numerous films and television shows. He played Grey Cloud, an ally of Indiana Jones, opposite Harrison Ford in a 1993 episode "Mystery of the Blues" of The Young Indiana Jones Chronicles. During the 1993 television season Grant had the recurring role of Auggie Velasquez, owner of the small-town general store and trading post, in Harts of the West.

He played the Gatekeeper in the 1999 film Purgatory. He played Chief Big Bear in the 2013 film The Lone Ranger. The same year, Grant appeared as a man who sells his truck to Walter White in the Breaking Bad episode "Ozymandias."

From 2012, Grant was a prominent member of the American Indian Advisory Board at the San Diego International Film Festival.

=== Accolades ===
Grant was awarded the American Legacy Award from the San Diego Film Festival, the lifetime achievement award from the Oceanside International Film Festival and a Living Legend Award by the Native American Music Awards (NAMA). In 2018, his album "Don't Let the Drums Go Silent" won the Record of the Year from NAMA.

== Death ==
Grant died in his sleep on July 27, 2021, at the age of 85. His friend and publicist said the cause of death was natural causes.

== Filmography ==
=== Film ===
- War Party - Freddie Man Wolf (1988)
- Small Time - The Holy Man (1996)
- Grey Owl - Brother of the Pow Wow Chief (1999)
- Legend of the Phantom Rider - Medicine Man (2002)
- Black Cloud - Grandpa (2004)
- Social Guidance - Red Hightower (2005)
- The World's Fastest Indian - Jake (2005)
- Beyond the Quest - Apparition (2007)
- Slipstream - Eddie (2007)
- Maneater - Stanley Hipp (2009)
- Walking on Turtle Island - Catches the Bear (2009)
- Awful Nice - Jonas (2013)
- Winter in the Blood - Yellow Calf (2013)
- The Lone Ranger - Chief Big Bear (2013)
- Wind Walkers - Native Elder (2015)
- The Ridiculous 6 - Screaming Eagle (2015)
- Waabooz - Grandfather (2016)
- Valley of the Gods - Tall Bitter Water (2017)
- Journey to Royal (and the 4th Emergency Rescue Squadron) - Himself (2017)

=== Television ===
- The Young Indiana Jones Chronicles - episode - The Mystery of the Blues - Grey Cloud (1993)
- Harts of the West - 15 episodes - Auggie (1993-1994)
- The Last Frontier- episode - The One with the Friends' Theme - Alaskan (1996)
- Nash Bridges - Ol'Larry/1 episode (1997)
- Stolen Women: Captured Hearts - Chief Luta/TV movie (1997)
- Baywatch - Eyes That See At Night/1 episode (1997)
- Purgatory - Ancient Gate Keeper/TV movie (1999)
- Auf Wiedersehen, Pet - Medecine Man/3 episodes (2002)
- Skinwalkers - Wilson Sam/TV movie (2002)
- Miracles - Most Respected Elder/1 episode (2003)
- DreamKeeper - Old Medecine Man/TV movie (2003)
- The Fallen Ones - Joseph/TV movie (2005)
- My Name is Earl - Dakota/1 episode (2005)
- Saving Grace - Mudwa/1 episode (2007)
- American Horror Story - Tribal Elder/1 episode (2011)
- Eagleheart - Saginaw/1 episode (2012)
- Family Tree - White Feather/1 episode (2013)
- Breaking Bad - Native American Man - episode "Ozymandias" (2013)
- Shameless - Great Grandfather/1 episode (2014)
- Community - Chief Blue Sky/1 episode (2014)
- The League - Sam/1 episode (2014)
- Workaholics - American Indian Man/1 episode (2015)
- Sin City Saints - Shaman/1 episode (2015)
- Baskets - Old Man/1 episode (2016)
- Veep - Marjorie's Grandpa/1 episode (2016)
