= Stefan Gierasch =

American actor (1926–2014)

- Born: February 5, 1926; New York City, New York, U.S.
- Died: September 6, 2014 (aged 88); Santa Monica, California, U.S.
- Occupation: Actor
- Years active: 1951–2009

Stefan Gierasch (February 5, 1926 – September 6, 2014) was an American film and television actor.

== Personal life ==
Gierasch was a native of New York and studied at The Actors Studio.

Gierasch was married 33 years to actress Hedy Sontag, at the time of his death. They had three children: Amanda, Elisa, and Matthew.

== Career ==
Gierasch made over 100 screen appearances, mostly in American television, beginning in 1951. In the mid-1960s, he performed with the Trinity Square Players in Providence, Rhode Island. He appeared in dozens of films including in The Hustler (1961), The Traveling Executioner (1970), Jeremiah Johnson (1972), What's Up Doc? (1972), High Plains Drifter (1973), Carrie (1976), Silver Streak (1976), Victory at Entebbe (1976), Blue Sunshine (1977), The Champ (1979), Blood Beach (1980) and Perfect (1985).

In 1994 he appeared in the Arnold Schwarzenegger and Danny DeVito film Junior as Edward Sawyer, and in 1995's Murder in the First as Warden James Humson. Gierasch made many TV appearances, as in Kung Fu, M*A*S*H, Starsky & Hutch, Gunsmoke (1966 S12E6’s “Gunfighter, RIP”), Star Trek: The Next Generation, Barney Miller and ER.

== Death ==
Gierasch died at home from a stroke in 2014 at the age of 88.

== Selected filmography ==
- The Young Don't Cry (1957) – Billy
- That Kind of Woman (1959) – Soldier (uncredited)
- The Hustler (1961) – Preacher
- The Alfred Hitchcock Hour (1963) (Season 1 Episode 22: "Diagnosis: Danger") - Sergeant Boyle
- The Traveling Executioner (1970) – Willy Herzallerliebst
- What's Up Doc? (1972) – Fritz
- Jeremiah Johnson (1972) – Del Gue
- The New Centurions (1972) – Landlord
- High Plains Drifter (1973) – Mayor Jason Hobart
- Claudine (1974) – Sanitation Foreman
- Cornbread, Earl and Me (1975) – Sergeant Danaher
- The Great Texas Dynamite Chase (1976) – Hotel Clerk
- Carrie (1976) – Mr. Morton
- Silver Streak (1976) – Professor Schreiner & Johnson
- Victory at Entebbe (1976) – General Mordecai Gur
- Blue Sunshine (1977) – Lieutenant Jennings
- The Champ (1979) – Charlie Goodman
- Blood Beach (1980) – Dr. Dimitrios
- Perfect (1985) – Charlie
- The Rosary Murders (1987) – Trupiano
- Spellbinder (1988) – Edgar DeWitt
- Miami Vice episode 5x16 "Victim of Circumstance" (1989)
- Megaville (1990) – Dr. Vogel
- Dark Shadows (1991) - Prof Woodard/ Joshua Collins
- Mistress (1992) – Stuart Stratland, Sr.
- Jack the Bear (1993) – Father-in-Law
- Dave (1993) – House Majority Leader
- Junior (1994) – Edward Sawyer
- Murder in the First (1995) – Warden James Humson
- Starry Night (1999) – Professor Beckmore
- Legend of the Phantom Rider (2002) – Nathan
- The Hunter's Moon (2009) – The Sage (final film role)
