= After Sundown (2006 film) =

- Theatrical release poster
- Directed by: Christopher Abram; Michael W. Brown
- Written by: Christopher Abram
- Produced by: Keith Randal Duncan
- Starring: Susana Gibb; Reece Rios; Natalie Jones; Michael W. Brown; Christopher Abram
- Cinematography: David Pinkston
- Edited by: Christopher Abram; David Pinkston
- Music by: Steven Barnett; Timothy Edward Smith
- Production company: After Sundown Film Partners
- Distributed by: Lionsgate Home Entertainment
- Release date: July 11, 2006
- Running time: 88 minutes
- Country: United States
- Language: English
- Budget: $20,000

After Sundown is a 2006 American horror Western film directed by Christopher Abram and Michael W. Brown, written by Abram, and starring Susana Gibb, Reece Rios, Natalie Jones, and co-directors Brown and Abram and produced and executive produced by Keith Randal Duncan. The plot is about a vampire gunslinger from the Old West who terrorizes a modern-day town when his bride is revived.

== Plot ==
After a female corpse in perfect condition is exhumed, two funeral home employees remove a wooden stake from it. The corpse instantly revives and reveals itself as a vampire. Sensing the return of his bride, the vampire who created her, an Old West gunslinger, comes to the town and begins to turn the people into zombies that serve his will.

== Cast ==
- Susana Gibb as Shannon
- Reece Rios as Mikey
- Natalie Jones as Molly
- Michael W. Brown as Benjamin
- Christopher Abram as the vampire
- Jake Billingsley as Sheriff Jimmy
- Joey Galt as the deputy
- Chris Whatley as the preacher
- Jamie Amaral as Niki
- Gayle Massey as the preacher's wife
- Angela Gair as the midwife

== Release ==
Lionsgate Home Entertainment released After Sundown on DVD on July 11, 2006.

== Reception ==
Bloody Disgusting rated it 2/5 stars and wrote that film is too unfocused and should have been set solely in the Old West. Jon Condit of Dread Central rated it 1/5 stars and wrote that the plot holes ruin the film despite the attempts by the cast to take the film seriously. Ian Jane of DVD Talk rated it 2/5 stars and wrote, "In short, the filmmakers show potential and are obviously an ambitious lot – they just didn't have either the means or the experience to pull it off this time." Mac McEntire of DVD Verdict wrote, "After Sundown promises low budget cowboy vampire zombie action, and that's just what it delivers. I doubt it'll ever be considered a horror classic, but fans of the genre could do a lot worse."

== See also ==
- Weird West, a subgenre of Western films to which this film belongs
