= The Decoy (2006 film) =

2006 film

- Directed by: Justin Kreinbrink
- Written by: Justin Kreinbrink; Tara Kreinbrink
- Produced by: Justin Kreinbrink; Erin Benzenhoefer; John Higgins
- Starring: Justin Kreinbrink; Howard Allen; Susan Arnold
- Cinematography: Damon Mosier; David E. Valdez
- Edited by: Erin Benzenhoefer; John Higgins; Justin Kreinbrink; Damon Mosier
- Music by: Charles David Denler
- Production company: Higgins/Kreinbrink Productions
- Distributed by: Echo Bridge Home Entertainment
- Release date: June 25, 2006
- Running time: 109 minutes
- Country: United States
- Language: English

The Decoy (2006) is a Western film that was shot in 2005 and finished in 2007 by Higgins/Kreinbrink Productions, an Arizona motion picture company.

== Synopsis ==
The story focuses on a mute blacksmith who is accused of murdering his surrogate parents. He must find a way to prove his innocence before his brother-in-law, a deputy named John, can bring him to Tucson, where he will be quickly tried and hanged.

== Cast ==
- Howard Allen as Preacher
- Susan Arnold as Mary Watson
- John Michael Bartish as Tucson Sheriff
- Leonard Batson as Livery Stable Man
- Tom Bushee as Earl
- Amos Carver as Amos

== Production ==
The Decoy was initially planned as a short film based on a 35 page script. At the end of principal photography, they ended up with a 70-minute movie, mostly due to the amount of time needed to show the reactions of the main character, who is mute. Filming took place over seventeen weeks and overall production took eighteen months. Kreinbrink was approached by several individuals interested in helping with the filming and production process of a Western.

== Release ==
The Decoy premiered in 2006 at The Fox Theatre in Tucson, AZ and was released on home video in 2007 through Echo Bridge Home Entertainment.

== Reception ==
True West Magazine was critical in their review, noting that "I’d hope that Kreinbrink’s next shot at a Western is more ambitious and less sentimental, and a tad less pretty; I get the feeling he’d be good at something darker and considerably more detailed." Michael Pitts was more favorable, stating that it was a "Low budget but enjoyable affair".

== Sources ==
- link AZ Star
- link Tucson Citizen
