= Chosen Few Motorcycle Club =

Multiracial outlaw motorcycle club

Chosen Few MC
- Abbreviation: CF, 36, CFMC
- Founded: 1959
- Founder: Lionel Ricks
- Type: motorcycle club
- Location: Los Angeles, San Diego, nation wide
- Website: chosenfewmc.org

The Chosen Few Motorcycle Club is the first mixed race 1%er outlaw motorcycle club. Their first white member joined in 1960. Founded in Los Angeles with chapters in California, Nevada, Arizona, Washington, Oregon, Idaho, Montana, Nebraska, Colorado, Texas, Oklahoma, Hawaii, Illinois, Florida, Georgia, Alabama, Louisiana, New York, Tennessee, Virginia, Kansas, Minnesota, Missouri, North Carolina and Internationally in the Philippines.

== History ==
The Chosen Few MC started around 1959 in Los Angeles California. The founding members were: Lionel, Lil Frank, Roger, Hawk, Slim, Shirly Bates, and Champ. These brothers all rode full dress Harleys & chopped dressers. Two names were placed on the table as to what the club was going to be called. "The Patriots Of Iron & Steel" was one, the "Chosen Few " the other. After choosing the latter, The Chosen Few MC was born.

== Other clubs ==
The same name is used by dozens of other unrelated motorcycle clubs in Iowa, New York, Texas, and other areas. The Chosen Few MC is based in the South Central California area with additional chapters nationwide and in the Philippines.
