= Killing of Morris Black =

2001 killing in Texas, United States

Morris Black

In October 2001, the dismembered remains of 71-year-old Morris Black were discovered floating in Galveston Bay. Black's neighbor, real estate heir Robert Durst, was charged with his murder. Durst testified he shot Black in self-defense and was acquitted due to a lack of forensic evidence to contest his account. Following the acquittal, Durst pleaded guilty to evidence tampering by dismembering Black's body.

== Morris Black ==
Morris "Jack" Julius Black was born on October 21, 1929, in Malden, Middlesex County, Massachusetts to Faigle "Fannie" (née Grusky) and Samuel Black.

Morris was one of six children. In childhood, Morris contracted polio; he would walk with a limp for the rest of his life. His parents suffered from mental problems and the children were placed in foster care. The siblings accused their father of sexual abuse in which Morris was alleged to have participated.

Black joined the Merchant Marines at age 18, returning in the 1950s.

In 1972, Black became co-owner of a building near Boston Harbor; the city foreclosed on Black in 1976, taking possession of the building. In 1980, he purchased a three-story Boston tenement; neighbors recall him as personally evicting a resident by force for dealing drugs rather than calling the police. In late 1981, Black rented space from a barbershop and worked repairing watches. The following year he returned to Boston. In 1987, he sold the tenement and moved south.

From 1988 to July 1994, Black resided in Galena Park, Texas. From September 1994 to June 1995, he lived in Long Beach, Mississippi. On October 6, 1997, Black was arrested in North Charleston, South Carolina, after a telephone dispute over a $50 bill in which he threatened to blow up the South Carolina Electric & Gas company He spent a night in jail, was convicted of a misdemeanor, and sentenced to community service.

After a time living in Brownsville, in October 1998, Black moved to Galveston. In November 1999, Black moved into his final residence, on Avenue K.

== Durst becomes Black's neighbor ==
In January 2001, Black began interacting with The Jesse Tree, a Galveston homeless shelter run by Ted Hanley. Black began buying cheap glasses in bulk and handing them out to the needy. In August, Hanley encountered Black, apparently in distress over unspecified problems. One Friday, Black approached Hanley and said he knew a wealthy individual who might be able to provide a $50,000 low-interest loan to help The Jesse Tree purchase new real estate; the following Monday, a strange man visited Hanley at The Jesse Tree wearing glasses with the lenses almost-completely covered in tape, pretending to be deaf and mute. Once in private, the man admitted to being able to speak, attributing his earlier silence to his hatred of women. The man initially requested $50, but Hanley came to believe the man didn't really need the money. After Black's death and Durst's arrest, Hanley identified his strange visitor as Robert Durst.

At the time of his death, Black had $140,000 in savings across multiple bank accounts.

== Arrest and trial ==
On October 9, 2001, Durst was arrested in Galveston shortly after body parts belonging to Black were found floating in Galveston Bay. He was released on $250,000 bail, missed a court hearing on October 16, and a warrant was issued for his arrest on a charge of bail jumping. On November 30, Durst was caught inside a Wegmans supermarket in Bethlehem, Pennsylvania, after trying to shoplift Band-Aids, a newspaper, and a chicken salad sandwich, despite having $500 in cash in his pocket. Among the items discovered in his rental car were $37,000 in cash, two guns, marijuana, Black's driver's license, and directions to Gilberte Najamy's home in Connecticut. Durst also used his time on the run to stalk his brother Douglas, visiting the driveway of his home in Katonah, New York, while armed. Durst employed defense attorney John Waldron while he was held on charges in Pennsylvania. He was eventually extradited to Texas for trial.

In 2003, Durst was tried for the murder of Morris Black. On the death of Black, the prosecution presented the jury with only a charge of capital murder, with no lesser murder or manslaughter charges. Durst employed defense attorney Dick DeGuerin and claimed self-defense; DeGuerin conducted two mock trials in preparation for the case. Durst's defense team found communicating with him to be difficult and hired psychiatrist Milton Altschuler to investigate. After spending 70 hours examining him, Altschuler diagnosed Durst with Asperger syndrome, saying, "His whole life's history is so compatible with a diagnosis of Asperger's disorder." His defense team argued at trial that the diagnosis explained his behavior.

Durst claimed that Black, a cranky and confrontational loner, grabbed his .22 caliber target pistol from its hiding place and threatened him with it. During the struggle for the pistol, the weapon discharged and shot Black in the face. During cross-examination, Durst admitted to using a paring knife, two saws, and an axe to dismember Black's body before bagging and dumping his remains in Galveston Bay. Black's head was never recovered, so prosecutors were unable to present sufficient forensic evidence to dispute Durst's account of the struggle. As a result of lack of forensics, the jury acquitted Durst of murder on November 11, 2003.

On December 21, 2004, Durst pleaded guilty to two counts of bail jumping and one count of evidence tampering (for his dismemberment of Black's body). As part of a plea bargain, he received a sentence of five years and was given credit for time served, requiring him to serve three years in prison. Durst was paroled on July 15, 2005. The rules of his release required him to stay near his home; permission was required to travel. That December, Durst made an unauthorized trip to the boarding house where Black was killed and to a nearby shopping mall. At the mall, he ran into former Galveston trial judge Susan Criss, who had presided over his trial. Due to this incident, the Texas Board of Pardons and Paroles determined that Durst had violated the terms of his parole and returned him to jail. He was released again from custody on March 1, 2006.

Asked in March 2015 whether she believed Durst murdered Black, Criss commented: "You could see that this person knew what they were doing and that it was not a first time. The body was cut perfectly like a surgeon who knew how to use this tool on this bone and a certain kind of tool on that muscle. It looked like not a first-time job. That was pretty scary." Private investigator Bobbi Bacha argues Morris Black had known Durst years prior and was likely involved in the disappearance of Durst's wife Kathleen in 1982.

== Sources ==
- Matt Birkbeck (2005). A Deadly Secret: the Bizarre and Chilling Story of Robert Durst. Berkley (Penguin Random House LLC). p. 257. ISBN 978-1101987421.
- Collins, Marion (2002). Without a Trace. New York: Macmillan. ISBN 0312985029. Archived from the original on October 6, 2020.
