= A Deadly Secret: The Strange Disappearance of Kathie Durst =

2002 book by Matt Birkbeck

A Deadly Secret
- First edition (h/b)
- Author: Matt Birkbeck
- Language: English
- Genre: Crime, biography
- Publisher: Berkley Books
- Publication date: September 2, 2003
- Media type: Print
- Pages: 304 pp (paperback ed.)
- ISBN: 978-0425192078

A Deadly Secret: The Strange Disappearance of Kathie Durst is the true story of Robert Durst, the heir to a New York real estate dynasty who has been a person of interest in the missing-person case of his wife Kathie since her 1982 disappearance. The book was written by journalist and author Matt Birkbeck, and was published by Berkley/Penguin. A Deadly Secret was released in hardcover in 2002 and in paperback in 2003.

The book was optioned in 2016 by A&E and Lifetime, and a film version was scheduled to be produced by Linda Berman of ABC 20/20's Lincoln Square Productions and written by Bettina Gilois, who penned Bessie for HBO. The television movie, titled The Lost Wife of Robert Durst, originally aired on November 11, 2017.

Birkbeck covered the Durst case for People magazine and Reader's Digest. A Deadly Secret reveals how Durst stole numerous identities in a bizarre cross-country trek that ultimately resulted in the murder and dismemberment of a drifter named Morris Black, in Galveston, Texas, in 2001. Durst was acquitted of murder in the Black case in 2003. Durst was also charged with first-degree murder in the 2000 murder of his friend Susan Berman.

In the 2003 paperback edition, Birkbeck also links Durst to the disappearances of two teenagers, Kristen Modafferi, who went missing in San Francisco in 1997, and Karen Mitchell, who vanished in Eureka, California, in 1997.

The book was updated again in 2015 with the title A Deadly Secret: The Bizarre and Chilling Story of Robert Durst and contains new or updated sections covering Durst's activities in the intervening years up to his arrest in New Orleans in March 2015, as well as the release of the 2010 film All Good Things and the 2015 HBO documentary The Jinx: The Life and Deaths of Robert Durst, both directed by Andrew Jarecki.
