= All Good Things (film) =

2010 film by Andrew Jarecki

- Theatrical release poster
- Directed by: Andrew Jarecki
- Written by: Marcus Hinchey; Marc Smerling
- Produced by: Andrew Jarecki; Michael London; Bruna Papandrea; Marc Smerling
- Starring: Ryan Gosling; Kirsten Dunst; Frank Langella; Philip Baker Hall
- Cinematography: Michael Seresin
- Edited by: David Rosenbloom; Shelby Siegel
- Music by: Rob Simonsen
- Production company: Groundswell Productions
- Distributed by: Magnolia Pictures (United States); The Weinstein Company (International)
- Release date: December 3, 2010
- Running time: 101 minutes
- Country: United States
- Language: English
- Budget: $20 million
- Box office: $1.8 million

All Good Things is a 2010 American mystery/crime romantic drama film directed by Andrew Jarecki and written by Marcus Hinchey and Marc Smerling. Inspired by the life of Robert Durst, it stars Ryan Gosling, Kirsten Dunst, and Frank Langella.

Gosling portrays David Marks, the son of a New York real estate tycoon (Langella), whose relationship with his wife (Dunst) becomes increasingly disturbing; he is later suspected of a series of murders and his wife's unsolved disappearance.

All Good Things was filmed between April and July 2008 in Connecticut and New York. Originally scheduled for a July 24, 2009 release, the film ultimately received a limited release on December 3, 2010.

Durst professed admiration for the film, and after previously not cooperating with journalists, offered to be interviewed by Jarecki. Durst would ultimately sit with Jarecki for more than 20 hours over a multi-year period, which led to the true crime documentary series The Jinx in 2015.

== Plot ==
David Marks, the son of powerful real estate tycoon Sanford Marks, marries working-class student Katie McCarthy in 1970s New York City. They move to Vermont and set up a health food store called All Good Things. However, Sanford manipulates David into returning to the city, telling him that Katie deserves more than he is currently giving her. Upon their return, Katie brings up the idea of having children. David says it will never happen, which leads Katie to assume something is wrong with his fertility. After buying a lake house, Katie tells their pregnant neighbor that she is expecting as well. David responds angrily upon finding out and forces Katie to make an appointment for an abortion. Called away to do work for his father, he does not come along for the appointment.

Katie enters medical school while her relationship with David continues to deteriorate. She makes inquiries about separating, but her funds, which she needs in order to pay for school, are cut off when she attempts to leave. Having been advised that she will need leverage to compel the family to give her a settlement, Katie attempts to find incriminating documents relating to their financial activities. She then disappears without a trace in 1982. Despite a $15,000 reward offered for any information on her whereabouts, the case remains unresolved.

Eighteen years later, the case is reopened by a district attorney after reading an unpublished novel written by David's best friend, Deborah Lehrman, which describes a murder almost identical to the Marks case. Soon after this is announced, Lehrman is shot and killed in her home, renewing suspicion of David, who is standing trial in Texas for the murder of his neighbor Malvern Bump. David is acquitted of the murder of Bump; the film states that nobody has ever been tried for Lehrman's murder and that Katie remains a missing person. A flashback implies that David left his wife's remains in the trunk of her car, which the father finds. The film ends with David visiting his dying father and whispering to him, "I miss her so much." It is left to the viewer to decide whether he is talking about Katie or his mother.

== Cast ==
- Ryan Gosling as David Marks (Robert Durst)
- Kirsten Dunst as Katie McCarthy (Kathleen McCormack)
- Frank Langella as Sanford Marks (Seymour Durst)
- Lily Rabe as Deborah Lehrman (Susan Berman)
- Philip Baker Hall as Malvern Bump (Morris Black)
- Michael Esper as Daniel Marks (Douglas Durst)
- Diane Venora as Janice Rizzo (Jeanine Pirro)
- Nick Offerman as Jim McCarthy (Jim McCormack)
- Kristen Wiig as Lauren Fleck
- Stephen Kunken as Todd Fleck
- John Cullum as Richard Panatierre (Dick DeGuerin)
- Maggie Kiley as Mary McCarthy
- Liz Stauber as Sharon McCarthy
- Marion McCorry as Ann McCarthy (Ann McCormack)
- Mia Dillon as Katie's Aunt
- Tom Kemp as Katie's Uncle
- Trini Alvarado as Sarah Davis
- Francie Swift as Kelly Callender
- David Margulies as Mayor
- Francis Guinan as Daniel Patrick Moynihan
- William Jackson Harper as Moynihan's Assistant
- Ashlie Atkinson as Bonnie Felder
- Julie Moran as Herself
- Socorro Santiago as Nurse
- Zabryna Guevara as Waitress
- Lanny Flaherty as Landlord
- Robert Clohessy as Superintendent
- Michelle Hurst as Newscaster
- Lola Pashalinski as Luxor Woman
- Zoe Lister-Jones as Reporter

== Production ==
The screenplay for All Good Things was written by Marcus Hinchey and Marc Smerling as a narrative loosely based on the events in the life of Robert Durst, a New York City real estate heir whose first wife, Kathleen McCormack, disappeared in 1982. The film's title refers to a health food store of the same name which Durst and McCormack had established in the 1970s.

After the script was completed and Andrew Jarecki had agreed to direct, Ryan Gosling was attached to star and Kirsten Dunst was in negotiations by late January 2008. By early April, Frank Langella was in final negotiations with the film's producers to join. Soon after, The Weinstein Company closed a deal to distribute All Good Things, and the film's budget was set at $20,000,000.

Filming began in April in New York City and various locations in Connecticut, which were chosen both for the tax incentives and the scenic and period locations. Shooting on Lillinonah Drive at a lakefront house in Brookfield, Connecticut began in early May. Five locations at the Fairfield University campus were used for several scenes over a week of filming. The set moved to Carl Schurz Park, New York City, briefly before switching back to Connecticut. Three scenes were shot at Canal Street, Shelton, Connecticut, on May 30–31. Much of the Canal Street filming focused on the "heavy, industrial features" of the area, although the crew made some edits, such as graffito removal.

A single minute-long scene was shot on a bridge over the Housatonic River. Scenes were shot on Route 7 in Gaylordsville, Connecticut, on June 3, where a shop opposite the local fire department was used as a health food store. The following day, filming moved to Waterbury, Connecticut. The Hospital of Saint Raphael was used as a filming location on June 6. The film set at the hospital was built on a vacant floor scheduled to be renovated, and took a week for set designers to prepare. Filming later returned to Brookfield, Connecticut. The crew also shot for two days at the Ridgefield Community Center—standing in for New York's Gracie Mansion—in Ridgefield, Connecticut. Manhattan's West 38th Street, between 7th and 8th Avenues, was used for the old 42nd Street for shooting on June 25–26; shops were converted into 1970s Times Square sex shops and strip shows.

Jarecki, who previously produced and directed the 2003 documentary Capturing the Friedmans, said that making All Good Things "was less about wanting to do a narrative feature vs. a documentary and more about the merits of this particular project". He shot "hundreds of hours of footage" of people associated with the true story of Robert Durst, saying that "It was part of the process. Maybe it will end up on the DVD some day."

He eventually used some of that footage in the HBO documentary miniseries The Jinx (2015). This included parts of the approximately twenty hours of discussion with Durst himself.

== Release ==
The film was originally set for release on July 24, 2009. In spring 2009, the film was delayed. An insider from The Weinstein Company stated that "the movie is really strong. We just needed more time to complete it." Soon after, the film was set to release on December 11, 2009, only to be delayed again. When the Weinstein Company released their upcoming film slate, All Good Things was listed for a March 2010 release. This never materialized.

In March 2010, director Andrew Jarecki bought back the U.S. distribution rights and was searching for a new distributor for the film. On August 24, 2010, Magnolia Pictures acquired the American rights and gave the film a theatrical release on December 3, 2010. The Weinstein Company retained the international rights along with basic cable television rights.

All Good Things was released on DVD and Blu-ray on March 29, 2011, with commentary by Jarecki and Robert Durst.

=== Critical reception ===
The film holds a 34% approval rating on review aggregator Rotten Tomatoes, based on 97 reviews with an average rating of 5.50 out of 10. The consensus was: "It's well-acted, and the true story that inspired it offers plenty of drama—which is why it's so frustrating that All Good Things is so clichéd and frustratingly ambiguous." On Metacritic, the film has a weighted average score of 57 out of 100, based on 27 critics, indicating "mixed or average" reviews.

Both Kirsten Dunst and Ryan Gosling were praised for their performances. Roger Ebert awarded the film three and a half out of four stars, applauded Dunst's performance, but added, "I don't understand David Marks after seeing this film, and I don't know if Andrew Jarecki does."

=== Box office ===
All Good Things earned $582,024 at the US box office and another $1,172,365 at the foreign box office for a worldwide total of $1,754,389.

== The Jinx ==
Robert Durst professed admiration for All Good Things and telephoned Jarecki after its release, offering to be interviewed, although he had not previously cooperated with journalists. Durst and Jarecki spent more than 20 hours together over several years. In 2015, director Jarecki's documentary series The Jinx was shown on HBO. Durst was arrested in New Orleans, Louisiana, on first degree murder charges the day before the final episode aired on March 15, in which he appeared unintentionally to confess to three murders. A second season, titled The Jinx: Part Two, aired in 2024, covering the events that occurred between the previous season and today.
