= David Rosenbloom =

American film editor

- Occupation: Film editor

David Rosenbloom is an American film and television editor with more than 20 film credits, as well as many television editing and directing credits. He was nominated for the Academy Award for Best Film Editing and the American Cinema Editors "Eddie" for The Insider (1999).

== Life and career ==
Rosenbloom co-edited The Insider with William Goldenberg and Paul Rubell; the film was directed by Michael Mann. The three editors were interviewed by Scott Essman in 1999 about the making of The Insider. Rubell noted that, "the camera work is kind of chaotic. It is the opposite of what you would call a controlled visual style. The camera is always moving and it is very jittery and when you look at the dailies, you see that the operators had great latitude in what they could physically do with the camera; they tried some wild things and Michael loved that. He would sort of control the chaos and shape it, but he allowed the chaos to occur." Rosenbloom added, "I never worked with a director who gave such precise notes - the fact that the notes were precise and that there were so many of them made them imprecise because you couldn't possibly do everything that the note said to do. If you did, you would have 24 versions of the scene. The notes provided you with a road map and oftentimes the chaos in the editing was trying to figure out the one way that you could first put the scene together."

Rosenbloom's earlier television work garnered several additional Eddie and Emmy Award nominations. He has been elected to the American Cinema Editors.

== Filmography ==
Editor
Year	Film	Director	Notes
1987	Best Seller	John Flynn	
1988	Fresh Horses	David Anspaugh	First collaboration with David Anspaugh
1993	Rudy	David Anspaugh	Second collaboration with David Anspaugh
1994	Blue Chips	William Friedkin	
1995	A Pyromaniac's Love Story	Joshua Brand	
1995	Moonlight and Valentino	David Anspaugh	Third collaboration with David Anspaugh
1996	Primal Fear	Gregory Hoblit	First collaboration with Gregory Hoblit
1997	The Peacemaker	Mimi Leder	First collaboration with Mimi Leder
1998	Deep Impact	Mimi Leder	Second collaboration with Mimi Leder
1999	The Insider	Michael Mann	First collaboration with Michael Mann
2000	Frequency	Gregory Hoblit	Second collaboration with Gregory Hoblit
2000	Pay It Forward	Mimi Leder	Third collaboration with Mimi Leder
2002	Hart's War	Gregory Hoblit	Third collaboration with Gregory Hoblit
2003	The Recruit	Roger Donaldson	
2004	The Last Shot	Jeff Nathanson	
2004	Friday Night Lights	Peter Berg	
2005	Dreamer	John Gatins	
2006	The Break-Up	Peyton Reed	
2007	Fracture	Gregory Hoblit	Fourth collaboration with Gregory Hoblit
2008	Untraceable	Gregory Hoblit	Fifth collaboration with Gregory Hoblit
2010	All Good Things	Andrew Jarecki	
2011	The Rite	Mikael Håfström	
2011	Immortals	Tarsem Singh	
2013	Out of the Furnace	Scott Cooper	First collaboration with Scott Cooper
2014	Transcendence	Wally Pfister	
2015	Black Mass	Scott Cooper	Second collaboration with Scott Cooper
2016	The Infiltrator	Brad Furman	
2019	Phil	Greg Kinnear	
2020	The Way Back	Gavin O'Connor	
2023	Plane	Jean-François Richet	First collaboration with Jean-François Richet
2026	Mutiny	Jean-François Richet	Second collaboration with Jean-François Richet

Editorial department
Year	Film	Director	Role	Notes
2004	The Alamo	John Lee Hancock	Additional film editor	
2009	Public Enemies	Michael Mann	Additional editor	Second collaboration with Michael Mann
2011	Battle: Los Angeles	Jonathan Liebesman	Additional editor	

Producer
Year	Film	Director	Credit
2010	All Good Things	Andrew Jarecki	Co-producer

Second unit director or assistant director
Year	Film	Director	Role
2002	Hart's War	Gregory Hoblit	Second unit director
2008	Untraceable	Gregory Hoblit	Second unit director: Additional photography

Thanks
Year	Film	Director	Role
2017	The Tribes of Palos Verdes	The Malloys	Special thanks

TV movies

Editor
Year	Film	Director
1979	Marciano	Bernard L. Kowalski
1981	Grambling's White Tiger	Georg Stanford Brown
1985	Do You Remember Love	Jeff Bleckner
1985	Brotherly Love	Jeff Bleckner
1985	Behind Enemy Lines	Sheldon Larry
1986	Under the Influence	Thomas Carter
1989	Swimsuit	Chris Thomson
1992	Quiet Killer	Sheldon Larry
1993	In the Company of Darkness	David Anspaugh
1993	Class of '61	Gregory Hoblit

TV series

Editor
Year	Title	Notes
1980	Tenspeed and Brown Shoe	4 episodes
1981−82	Hill Street Blues	15 episodes
1983	Bay City Blues	1 episode
1984	Miami Vice	1 episode
1987	Private Eye	3 episodes
1990	Equal Justice	1 episode
1991	I'll Fly Away	1 episode
1996	NYPD Blue	1 episode
2022	Tokyo Vice	1 episode

Director
Year	Title	Notes
1983	Hill Street Blues	1 episode
1991	Equal Justice	1 episode
1991	Civil Wars	1 episode
1992	Melrose Place	1 episode
1992	Reasonable Doubts	1 episode
1996	NYPD Blue	1 episode

Producer
Year	Title	Credit	Notes
1983−84	Bay City Blues	Associate producer	3 episodes
1990−91	Equal Justice	Co-producer	25 episodes
