= Crimetown =

True crime podcast

- Genre: Crime; Investigative journalism
- Language: English

Cast and voices
- Hosted by: Marc Smerling; Zac Stuart-Pontier

Music
- Theme music composed by: Jon Ivans
- Opening theme: "Run To Your Mama" by Goat

Production
- Production: Marc Smerling; Zac Stuart-Pontier; Drew Nelles; Austin Mitchell; Kaitlin Roberts; Mike Plunkett; Laura Sim; Alex Blumberg; Caitlin Kenney
- Length: approx. 35 minutes

Technical specifications
- Audio format: Podcast

Publication
- No. of seasons: 2
- No. of episodes: 46; 37 episodes, 9 bonus episodes
- Original release: November 2016
- Provider: Gimlet Media

Related
- Website: Crimetownshow.com

Crimetown is a serial documentary podcast hosted by Marc Smerling and Zac Stuart-Pontier and produced by Gimlet Media which looks at how organized crime has shaped particular American cities. The first season started in 2016 and focused on the city of Providence, Rhode Island.

== Background and production ==
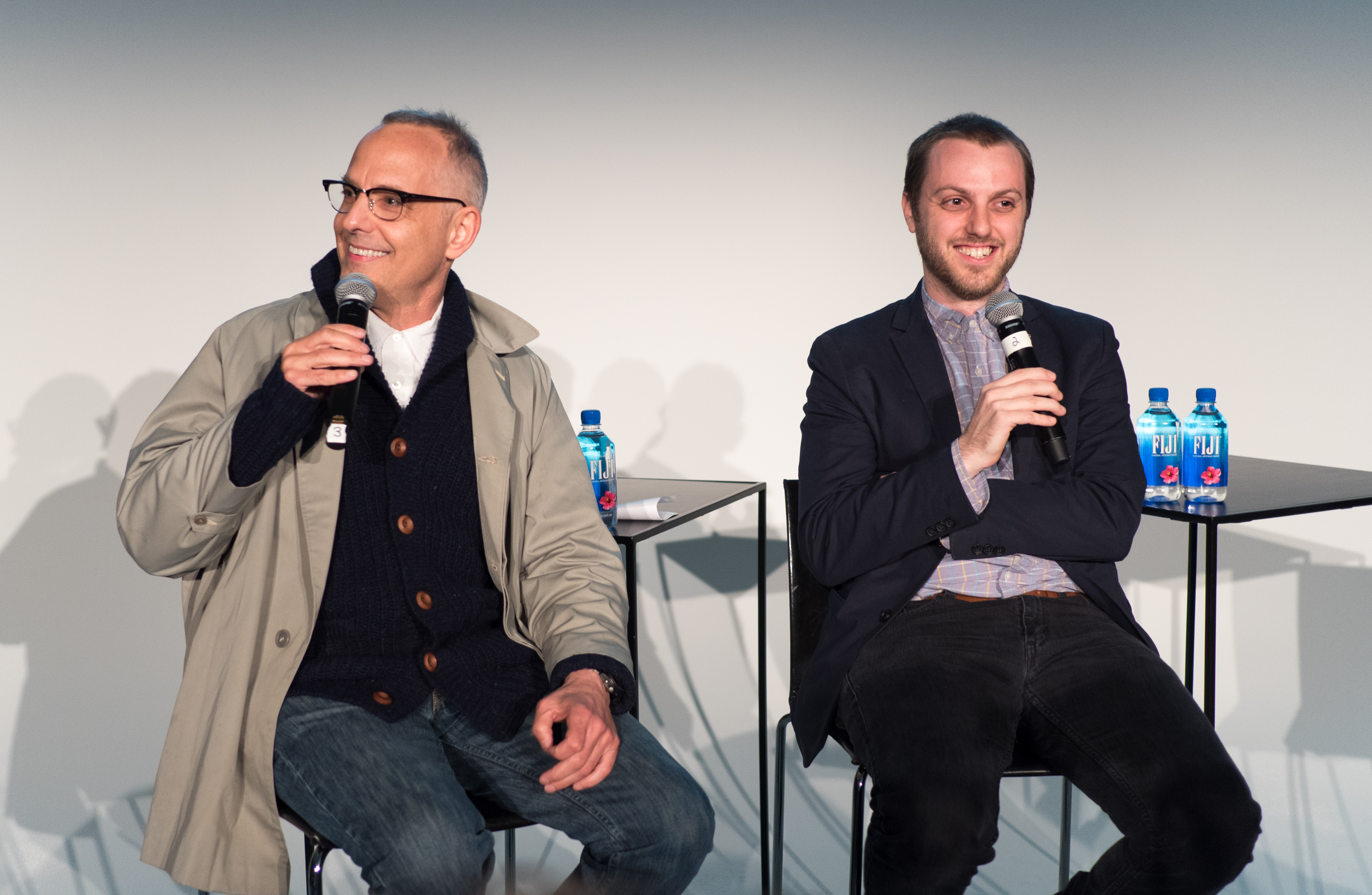
Smerling and Stuart-Pontier at a Crimetown Live event in New York City

Hosts Marc Smerling and Zac Stuart-Pontier first worked together on the film Catfish, and later collaborated on HBO's The Jinx. Publisher Gimlet Media's CEO Alex Blumberg met Stuart-Pontier when Blumberg interviewed him for a This American Life segment in 2000. Smerling and Stuart-Pontier initially tried to bring Blumberg on as producer of an audio follow-up to The Jinx, but Blumberg was more interested in a new project, rather than a companion piece.

Production of season 1 began in summer 2015. Smerling and Stuart-Pontier took senior producer and host roles. Production staff also includes Drew Nelles, Austin Mitchell, Kaitlin Roberts, Mike Plunkett, and Laura Sim. It is edited by Blumberg and Caitlin Kenney, and fact checked by Mick Rouse.

Smerling and Stuart-Pontier conducted extensive local research for the podcast, and received help from the Providence Journal, the Rhode Island Historical Society, and the Providence city archives. In particular, podcast personnel worked with the Journal and its staff at many stages of the process, from developing connections with sources to regular reviews of each episode as they were released. Nieman Lab's Ken Doctor noted this unofficial partnership between podcasters and local journalism—which has struggled to adapt to the Internet—might be the beginning of "a new local media format".

It was the Journal's first step into podcasting other than its sports-related coverage. Although the paper's Managing Editor, Alan Rosenberg, is unsure how far it can go into the medium, former executive editor Dave Butler said "Promoting, using, and helping Crimetown was a natural for the Providence Journal. It gave us the opportunity to relive history thru a podcast—as in real voices. This part of the future—partnering with others on their specialty — is great for readers and offers revenue opportunities. [...] a great reminder of the kind of material we have in our archives but don't know what to do with it..."

The creators and producers of Crimetown have explored the possibility of turning the series into a film or television show.

The creators of Crimetown launched the podcast The RFK Tapes under Crimetown Presents on June 5, 2018, marking the 50th anniversary since the Assassination of Robert F. Kennedy.

== Season 1 ==
Season 1 of Crimetown focuses on organized crime and corruption in Providence, Rhode Island. It debuted in November 2016 and includes 18 episodes plus 7 bonus episodes.

=== Synopsis ===
Unlike many other examples in the true crime genre, there is no single narrative, such as a particular crime, that runs through the show, but several recurring, interrelated characters and events connected to the Patriarca crime family and Providence Mayor Buddy Cianci. The shows relies on techniques of investigative journalism to supplement the drama with hard reporting on new details or little-known connections. The New York Times called it "less Law & Order, more The Wire," referencing two popular television series. Most episodes focus on a particular character or story and draw connections to those in previous episodes, coming together to form a picture of crime and corruption in Providence in the late 20th century. Smerling and Stuart-Pontier talked about their interest in the "tree roots" in Providence shared by a wide range of people.

Though many of the episodes do not cover Cianci, his career and persona run through the show, paralleling the city's complicated relationships and contradictions arising from the interplay of good intentions and crime. According to The Boston Globe, "everything in the series is built on duality and dichotomy, from the two hills that make up the city (one controlled by the mob, the other home to the WASP elite) to the mayor himself." Cianci began his career as a prosecutor fighting against corruption and organized crime, ran for mayor on an anti-corruption platform, got elected with help from organized crime, and last later convicted for corruption.

=== Subjects ===
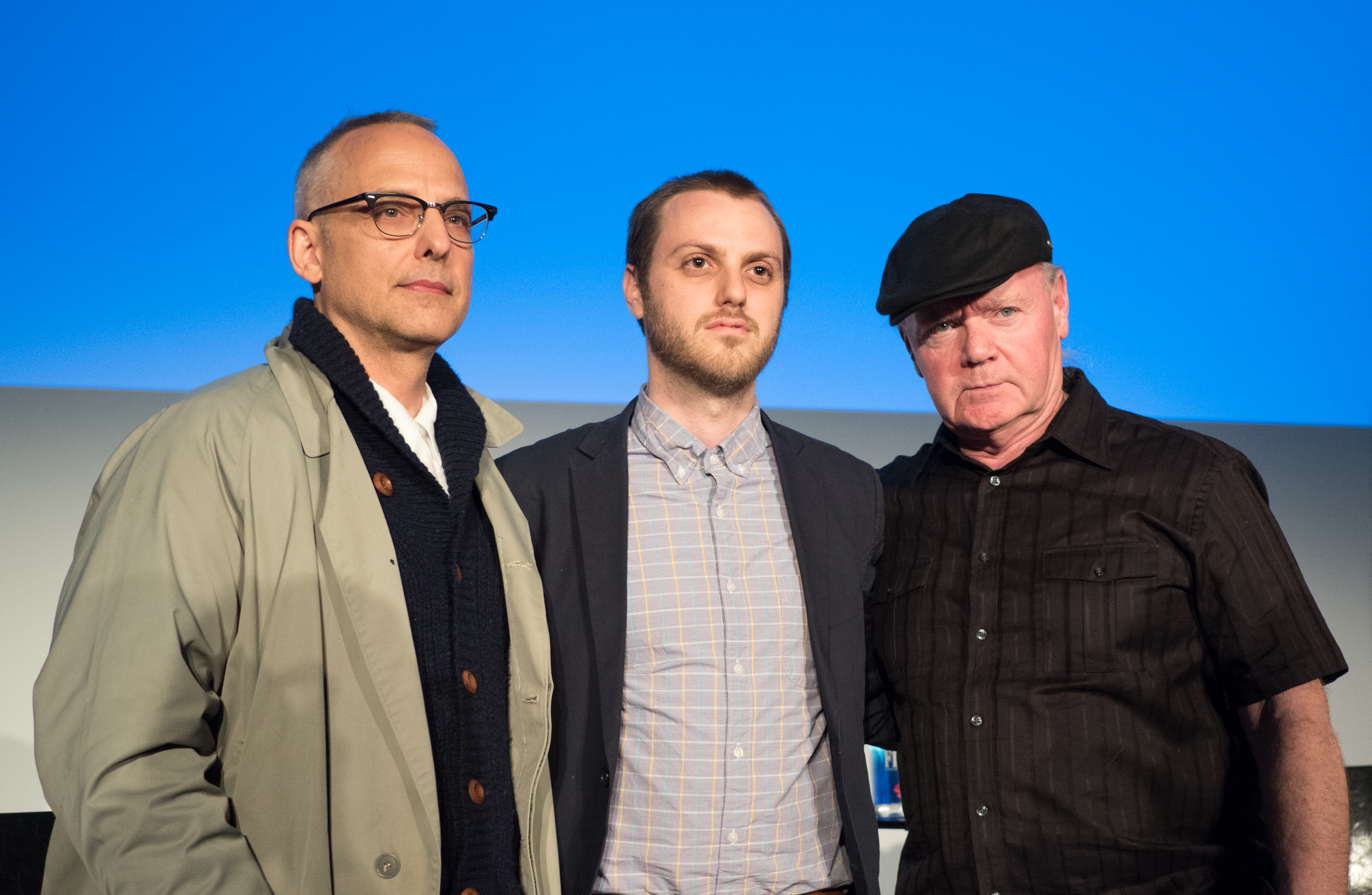
Creators Marc Smerling and Zac Stuart-Pontier with one of the subjects of the podcast, Charles Kennedy, at "Crimetown Live" in New York City in May 2018.

- Dennis Aiken, FBI special agent working on Operation Plunder Dome, following Buddy Cianci.
- Brian Andrews, police detective who spent a large part of his law enforcement career pursuing thief Tony Fiore, whom Andrews credits with helping his career.
- Joseph Bevilacqua, Sr., defense attorney for members of organized crime who became the state's Chief Justice. When he maintained some ties to organized crime, he resigned during impeachment proceedings.
- Joseph Bevilacqua, Jr., defense attorney and son of Joseph Bevilacqua, Sr. The show dedicated an episode to the story of a survivor of years of manipulation and sexual abuse by Bevilacqua, Jr., beginning when he gave her cocaine when she was 17 and he was 53.
- Buddy Cianci, former prosecutor who ran for mayor of Providence on an anti-corruption platform but became corrupt himself. After resigning when convicted of assault, he ran for mayor again and won, only to be convicted again for racketeering and other charges years later. The Boston Globe described Cianci's portrayal as "a walking embodiment of the city's contradictions."
- Robert Dussault, lead thief of the Bonded Vault heist who turned state's evidence when a hit was put on him.
- Tony Fiore, organized career thief with connections to the Patriarca family. Pursued for years by officer Brian Andrews. After a 10-year prison stint, Fiore began robbing armored cars. He and several associates were caught during an attempted robbery at Emerald Square Mall. After a total of about 30 years in prison, he was released and went into the painting business.
- Charles "The Ghost" Kennedy, a major drug trafficker and lock picker who got his nickname because he was so difficult to catch. He became known for his financial success, elaborate parties, and pet wolves at his house in East Greenwich.
- Raymond L. S. Patriarca, head of the Patriarca crime family.
- Barbara H. Roberts, Rhode Island's first woman cardiologist and director of the Women's Cardiac Center at Miriam Hospital. She was Raymond Patriarca's cardiologist who kept him out of court for health reasons towards the end of his life. Also, as she disclosed publicly for the first time on Crimetown, she had been mistress to mob boss Luigi "Baby Shacks" Manocchio.
- Gerald "Gerry" Tillinghast, a Vietnam veteran turned mob enforcer for Patriarca. Tillinghast helped to get Buddy Cianci elected and, despite Cianci running on an anti-corruption platform, he was given a high-profile government job in exchange. He was acquitted in the Bonded Vault heist trial, but convicted on a later murder charge. At the time of recording, he was spending time as a Dungeons & Dragons's Dungeon Master.
- Arlene Violet, sometimes called "Attila the Nun", left the convent who became Rhode Island's attorney general and foresaw the banking collapse of the 1990s.
- Bobby Walason, worked for Patriarca doing loan sharking and running protection rackets. After being shot and nearly dying, he decided to leave organized crime. He has since sold a fitness product on the Home Shopping Network and started a moving and storage business.

=== Soundtrack ===
The title song, used throughout the show, is "Run To Your Mama" by the Swedish band Goat. Gimlet Media's Matthew Boll was sound designer and theme music was composed by Jon Ivans, with additional scoring by Edwin, Bienart, John Kusiak, and Kenny Kusiak.

Towards the end of the season, producers released a stand-alone soundtrack with music from the show. It includes a combination of original and previously released tracks.

== Season 2 ==
Crimetown's second season, focusing on police corruption and brutality in the city of Detroit, Michigan in the 1970s, began on October 2, 2018. The final episodes of the season discuss the corruption case against Detroit Mayor Kwame Kilpatrick.

== Episodes ==
=== Season 1 (2016–2017) ===
No. overall	No. in season	Title	Original release date
–	–	"Coming Soon"	October 30, 2016
1	1	"Chapter 1: Divine Providence"	November 20, 2016
2	2	"Chapter 2: The Wiseguys"	November 20, 2016
3	3	"Chapter 3: The Making of a Mayor"	November 27, 2016
4	4	"Chapter 4: The Bonded Vault Heist"	December 4, 2016
5	5	"Chapter 5: The Art of the Deal"	December 11, 2016
6	6	"Chapter 6: Gerald and Harold"	December 18, 2016
7	7	"Chapter 7: Power Street"	January 22, 2017
8	8	"Chapter 8: Cat and Mouse"	January 29, 2017
9	9	"Chapter 9: A Deal With the Devil"	February 5, 2017
10	10	"Chapter 10: The Ghost"	February 26, 2017
11	11	"Chapter 11: The Doctor Broad"	March 5, 2017
12	12	"Chapter 12: Mob Justice"	March 12, 2017
13	13	"Chapter 13: The Network"	March 19, 2017
14	14	"Bonus Episode: Cat and Mouse Part II"	March 26, 2017
15	15	"Chapter 14: Renaissance Man"	April 2, 2017
16	16	"Chapter 15: Family Ties"	April 9, 2017
17	17	"Bonus Episode: The Gangster's Daughter"	April 16, 2017
18	18	"Chapter 16: Operation Plunder Dome"	April 23, 2017
19	19	"Chapter 17: The Trial of Buddy Cianci"	April 30, 2017
20	20	"Chapter 18: The Prince of Providence"	May 7, 2017
21	21	"The Crimetown Season One Soundtrack"	May 18, 2017
22	22	"Bonus Episode: Crimetown Live in Brooklyn"	May 21, 2017
23	23	"Bonus Episode: The Arrest of Ralph DeMasi"	June 4, 2017
24	24	"Bonus Episode: Sins of the Father"	November 29, 2017
25	25	"Bonus Episode: Courtney"	December 19, 2017
26	26	"Bonus Episode: Buddy Cianci...The Musical"	December 23, 2017

=== Season 2 (2018–2019) ===
No. overall	No. in season	Title	Original release date
–	–	"Coming Soon: Season 2"	September 20, 2018
27	1	"S2 E01: Stop the Robberies, Enjoy Safe Streets"	October 1, 2018
28	2	"S2 E02: The Battle for Detroit"	October 1, 2018
29	3	"S2 E03: The Fat Man and the Field MArshall"	October 8, 2018
30	4	"S2 E04: The Kingpins' Kids"	October 15, 2018
31	5	"S2 E05: YBI to the Day I Die"	October 22, 2018
32	6	"S2 E06: The Mayor, the Barber, and the Babysitter"	November 5, 2018
33	7	"S2 E07: Who Killed Damion Lucas?"	November 12, 2018
34	8	"S2 E08: Operation Backbone"	November 19, 2018
35	9	"S2 E09: Dimitri"	December 3, 2018
36	10	"S2 E10: Right Here, Right Now"	December 10, 2018
37	11	"S2 E11: The Hip Hop Mayor"	December 17, 2018
38	12	"S2 E12: Fake News"	January 7, 2019
39	13	"S2 E13: Gary Brown v. Mayor of Detroit"	January 14, 2019
40	14	"S2 E14: The Affair"	January 21, 2019
41	15	"S2 E15: The Murder of Tamara Greene"	February 4, 2019
42	16	"S2 E16: Surrendered"	February 11, 2019
43	17	"S2 E17: Operation Bombay Dreams"	February 18, 2019
44	18	"S2 E18: United States v. Kwame Kilpatrick"	March 4, 2019
45	19	"S2 E19: From the Ashes"	March 11, 2019
46	20	"Bonus Episode: The Streets Don't Love You Back"	September 5, 2019

== Reception ==
Crimetown received mostly positive reviews from critics, and by the end of the month was the most downloaded podcast on iTunes in the United States, third most popular in Canada, second in Australia, and sixth in the United Kingdom. The New York Times named it one of the "Best New Podcasts of 2016," saying it "advances the [true crime] genre." Reviewing the first episode, USA Today said that while the basic description of the show might sound boring, "[r]are audio, exciting music and compelling characters make [it] a worthwhile listen." The A.V. Club called it "as slick and engrossing as a podcast by Oscar-nominated producers promises to be" and praised the way the show captures touching moments in interviews with violent criminals.

The Ringer called it "a bracing, investigating deep dive into crime and corruption—and part of a wave of podcasts that are primed for TV and film adaptation." It also commented that "despite the density of information it conveys, it's not a slog. It's a story that would inspire any pulp fiction writer." The Boston Globe described the podcast as "morbidly fascinating and often laugh-out-loud surreal" and called it "as addictive as a bottle of pep pills," but added that the series "represents the latest wrinkle in packaging and selling criminal enterprise as ghoulish, diversionary fun while arguably soft-pedaling the human misery left in its wake." Vulture called it a "pulpy delight." Several reviewers drew comparisons with the podcasts Serial and S-Town, and Netflix's Making a Murderer television miniseries.

The mayor of Providence during the release of the podcast, Jorge Elorza, said that the show was "terrible for Providence".

== Events ==
During and following the end of the first season, creators Smerling and Stuart-Pontier held live events in Brooklyn, Boston, and Providence, and then went on tour with "Crimetown Live." Different characters from the podcast join for a live conversation and to answer audience questions.

== See also ==
- List of American crime podcasts
