= Marc Smerling =

American film producer, screenwriter, cinematographer, and director

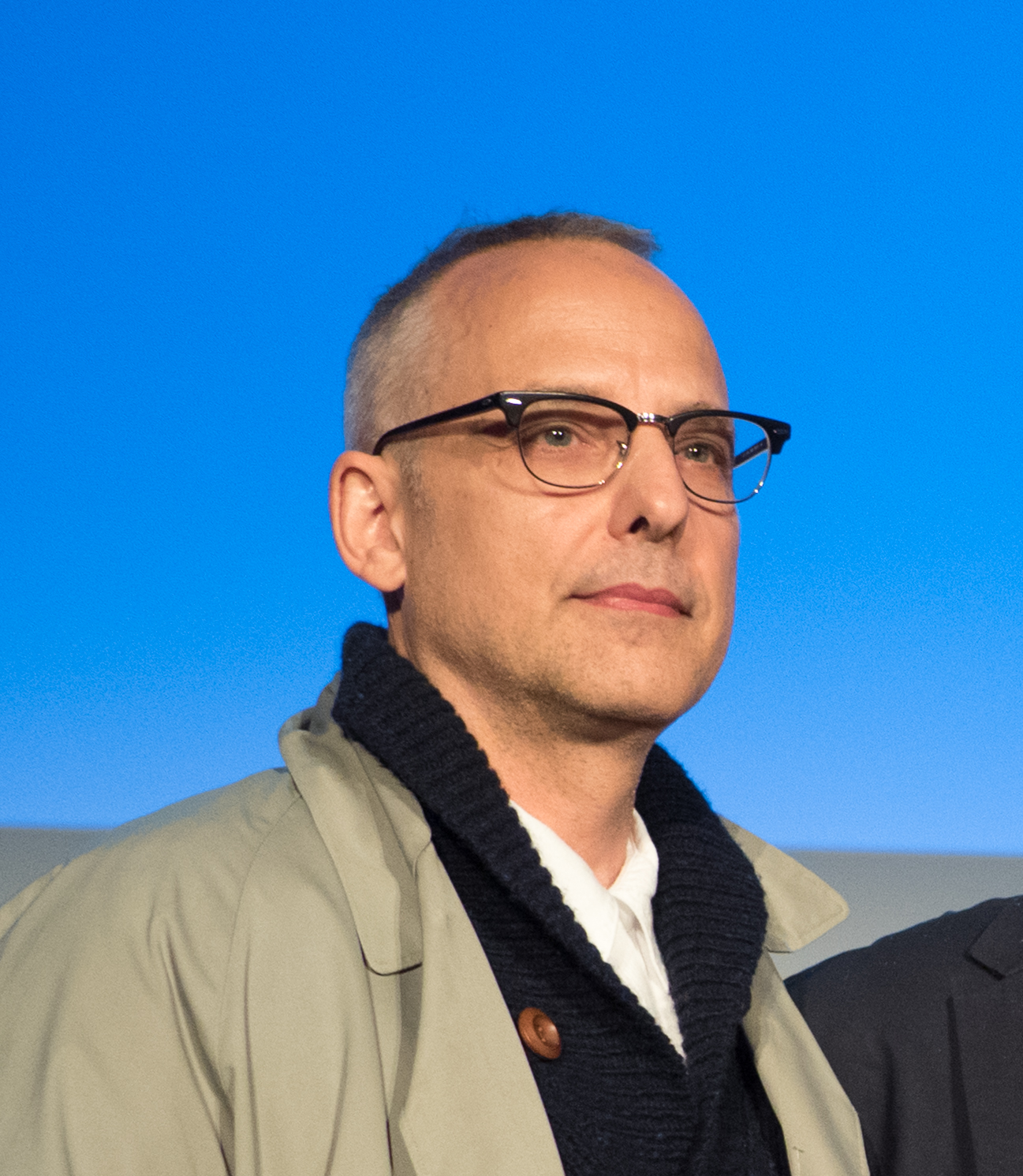

Marc Smerling is an American film producer, screenwriter, cinematographer, and director. He was nominated for an Oscar for Capturing the Friedmans in 2003, and co-wrote and produced The Jinx, a six-part HBO documentary on suspected murderer Robert Durst. He directed the FX docuseries A Wilderness of Error based on the book of the same name.

== Education ==
Smerling attended S. I. Newhouse School of Public Communications at Syracuse University and has earned a Master of Arts degree in film production from University of Southern California.

== Career ==
Early in his career, Smerling was the associate producer of NBC's Gangs, Cops and Drugs with Tom Brokaw, and The New Hollywood. He then founded production company Notorious Pictures, producing and directing more than a hundred television commercials and music videos.

Smerling partnered up with Andrew Jarecki to form their own production company Hit the Ground Running. He produced 2003's Capturing the Friedmans, which was the winner of the Grand Jury Prize at the Sundance Film Festival and nominated for an Academy Award for Best Documentary and 2010's documentary film Catfish, which inspired the television series Catfish: The TV Show.

In 2010, Smerling produced and wrote his first narrative feature film All Good Things, starring Ryan Gosling, Kirsten Dunst and Frank Langella, about the suspected murderer and real estate scion Robert Durst. The film was the predecessor to the 2015 HBO documentary miniseries The Jinx, which Smerling co-wrote and produced with Andrew Jarecki and Zachary Stuart-Pontier. He won the 2015 Primetime Emmy Award for Outstanding Documentary Series and was nominated for Outstanding Cinematography for Nonfiction Programming.

Smerling and Stuart-Pontier co-created the podcast Crimetown, which debuted in 2016 and quickly became the most popular U.S. podcast on iTunes. Each season of Crimetown examines how organized crime shaped an American city, starting with Providence, Rhode Island, in season one. They also co-created The RFK Tapes a Crimetown Presents podcast about the assassination of Robert F. Kennedy. In 2022, he hosted a 15-part podcast series focused on the Mahoning Valley mafia and Congressman Jim Traficant called "Crooked City: Youngstown OH."

== Filmography ==
=== Film ===
Year	Title	Producer	Writer
2003	Capturing the Friedmans	Yes	No
2010	All Good Things	Yes	Yes
2010	Catfish	Yes	No

=== Television ===
Year	Title	Director	Producer	Writer	Cinematographer
2013	Catfish: The TV Show	No	Yes	No	No
2015	The Jinx: The Life and Deaths of Robert Durst	No	Yes	Yes	Yes
2020	A Wilderness of Error	Yes	Yes	No	No
