= The Jury Speaks =

- Genre: Documentary
- Country of origin: United States
- Original language: English
- No. of seasons: 1
- No. of episodes: 5

Production
- Running time: 43 minutes

Original release
- Network: Oxygen
- Release: July 21 – July 24, 2017

The Jury Speaks is an American documentary television series airing on Oxygen. The show reexamines some of the most high-profile and controversial cases in history through the eyes of the people who served on the original jury.

== Episodes ==
No.	Title	Original release date
1	"O. J. Simpson"	July 21, 2017
2	"Michael Jackson"	July 22, 2017
3	"Robert Blake"	July 22, 2017
4	"George Zimmerman"	July 23, 2017
5	"Robert Durst"	July 24, 2017
