= Chinga Chavin =

American musician (1944–2023)

- Also known as: Nathan Allen "Nick" Chavin
- Born: July 3, 1944
- Died: March 15, 2023 (aged 78) Boca Raton, Florida
- Genres: Comedy
- Occupations: Musician, advertising executive
- Label: Attic

Nathan Allen "Nick" Chavin (July 3, 1944 – March 15, 2023), also known by the stage name Chinga Chavin, was an American musician and advertising executive. Chavin released the album Country Porn in 1976 on Attic Records.

== Life and career ==
Nick "Chinga" Chavin was born in 1944 to a Jewish family. He achieved considerable notoriety when he recorded and released the raunchy comedy album Country Porn in 1976. It was sold through the mail by Penthouse magazine and sold over 100,000 units. Country Porn was reissued on CD in 1992 with liner notes, a booklet complete with song lyrics and photographs, and four bonus songs.

Track 2 of the album is a song Chavin wrote with friend Kinky Friedman, the comedic "Asshole from El Paso," a blithely vulgar parody of the country classic "Okie From Muskogee" by Merle Haggard. Friedman later recorded a much shorter and less rudely worded version of the song. Track 3 of the album, "Cum Stains on the Pillow", was covered in reworded form by David Allan Coe, on his 1978 album Nothing Sacred.

Chavin's other albums are Jet Lag and Live and Politically Erect. He contributed two songs to the soundtrack of the adults only mystery thriller Punk Rock. Chavin ran an advertising agency in New York City.

== Personal life ==
Chavin was friends with Robert Durst. He testified against Durst in the murder trial of Susan Berman and appeared in the second season of The Jinx.

Chavin died in Boca Raton, Florida, on March 15, 2023. In a remembrance, longtime friend and collaborator Kinky Friedman said, “He’s a guy who had a lot to offer. He really walked his own road.”

== Selected discography ==
- Country Porn (Attic – LAT 1094, 1976)
1. Talkin' Matamoros First Piece O' Ass Blues
2. Asshole From El Paso
3. Cum Stains On The Pillow (Where Your Sweet Head Used To Be)
4. Head Boogie
5. Sit, Sit, Sit (Sit On My Face)
6. Dry Humping In The Back Of A '55 Ford
7. Get It On The Run
8. Tit Stop Rock
9. 4:00 A.M. Jump
10. Cum Unto Jesus (A Sacred Tune)
11. Bennies An' Beer
12. No Sell-Out Too Small
13. Jailbait
14. Scum Floats

(The last four songs were bonus tracks on the 1992 CD re-issue and were from the Jet Lag album)
