= Suburban Madness =

2004 television film by Robert Dornhelm

- Genre: Crime drama
- Based on: "Suburban Madness" by Skip Hollandsworth
- Teleplay by: Kimberlee Reed
- Directed by: Robert Dornhelm
- Starring: Sela Ward; Elizabeth Peña; Rheagan Wallace; Kate Greenhouse; Kirsten Bishopric; Brett Cullen
- Music by: John Altman
- Country of origin: United States
- Original language: English

Production
- Executive producers: Craig Zadan; Neil Meron
- Producer: Mark Winemaker
- Production location: Toronto
- Cinematography: Paul Sarossy
- Editor: Victor Du Bois
- Running time: 89 minutes
- Production companies: Storyline Entertainment; Sony Pictures Television

Original release
- Network: CBS
- Release: October 3, 2004

Suburban Madness is a 2004 American crime drama television film directed by Robert Dornhelm, based on the true story of the murder of David Lynn Harris, and starring Sela Ward. It aired on CBS on October 3, 2004.

== Plot ==
Suburban Madness is loosely based on the true story of 44-year-old Clara Harris, a successful Texas dentist and mother of young twins, who hired private investigator Bobbi Bacha to spy on her philandering orthodontist husband.

Clara discovers that her husband is cheating with a new secretary at the dental office, Lisa, who is recently divorced from her husband. Lisa, who is noticeably much more attractive than Clara has no trouble capturing all of David's attention. The two fall in love. After hearing from her stepdaughter Amy and a receptionist at the office about her husband's cheating, Clara tries to become more appealing to David, but to no avail. Clara hires Bobbi to follow David where he and Lisa have one final affair at a posh hotel, the hotel where Clara and David got married, no less. Despite Bobbi's warnings for Clara to stay away until the investigation is done, it ends with Clara, also accompanied by Amy, bursting in and attacking Lisa. David tells her that it's over once and for all and both women leave the hotel in tears. As David walks Lisa out of the hotel, he is run over by his once loving wife.

== Cast ==
- Sela Ward as Bobbi Bacha
- Elizabeth Peña as Clara Harris
- Rheagan Wallace as Amy Harris
- Kate Greenhouse as Rebecca "Lisa" Singer
- Kirsten Bishopric as Pam Wright
- Brett Cullen as David Harris

== Background ==
The filmmakers had read about the Clara Harris case in a Texas Monthly magazine article. Ward said the movie would present that story less as a true crime case than a "broader picture about marriage in America today." She based her character on a private investigator she met before filming started. Filming took place in Toronto, Canada from May to June 2004.

Several critics situated the film amid a broader trend of movies and television series about suburban crime and dysfunction, such as the recently released show Desperate Housewives and TV movie Revenge of the Middle-Aged Woman.

== Reception ==
Suburban Madness received somewhat poor reviews from some critics. The New York Times wrote that the story turned its real-life origins into "a banal made-for-television parable about adultery." The Star-News called it "overreaching," writing that the plot events did not cohere.

The film received fairly negative reaction in Texas due to its loose interpretation of some facts, somewhat inaccurate and stereotypical representation of the people and the area, and use of a Canadian filming location in the northern rockies that bears almost no resemblance to the real subtropical coastal communities of Friendswood and Clear Lake City, Texas.
