= Rusty Hardin =

American lawyer

- Born: Russell Hardin Jr. October 6, 1941 (age 83); Durham, North Carolina, U.S.
- Education: Wesleyan University (BA); Southern Methodist University (JD)

Russell "Rusty" Hardin Jr. (born October 6, 1941) is an American attorney and head of the Houston law firm Rusty Hardin & Associates, P.C. which he established in 1996.

== Early life ==
Hardin attended a private military academy in Chattanooga, Tennessee, called Baylor School (now a coed, independent day and boarding school). He graduated in 1960 and was influenced by one of his teachers at Baylor, Stan Lewis, to attend Wesleyan University in Middletown, Connecticut. Hardin is a 1965 graduate of Wesleyan and went on to earn his J.D. degree in 1975 at Southern Methodist University Dedman School of Law in Dallas, Texas.

== Career ==
During the Enron scandal, Hardin represented the accounting firm of Arthur Andersen. His efforts resulted in the US Supreme Court unanimously overturning the firm's conviction of obstruction of justice in 2005.

Hardin has represented and won favorable verdicts for athletes such as Rudy Tomjanovich, Warren Moon, Wade Boggs, Rafer Alston, Scottie Pippen, Steve Francis, and Calvin Murphy. Another former client is Roger Clemens, who had been embroiled in accusations of having perjured himself before Congress over alleged steroid use. Clemens was acquitted on June 18, 2012, on all charges that he obstructed justice and lied to Congress when he denied using performance-enhancing drugs as a Major League Baseball pitcher. Other clients include Michael Bennett of the New England Patriots; Deshaun Watson formerly of the Houston Texans and currently of the Cleveland Browns; Adrian Peterson, accused of child abuse; and NASCAR driver Kurt Busch, who was accused of domestic abuse against his former girlfriend.

Hardin successfully represented Victoria Osteen, wife of TV evangelist and bestselling author Joel Osteen, in a civil lawsuit filed by a Continental Airlines flight attendant. The flight attendant claimed that she had been pushed by Osteen, and sought civil damages, but a Houston jury acquitted her in 2008. Hardin also won a favorable verdict for the estate of Texas millionaire J. Howard Marshall. A jury found that the estate owed nothing to Marshall's widow, former Playboy model Anna Nicole Smith, who married Marshall when he was 89 years old.

Hardin represented the family of Los Angeles Angels pitcher Tyler Skaggs, who died on July 1, 2019.

In early June 2023, the Texas House committee investigating Texas attorney general Ken Paxton announced the hiring of Hardin and fellow high-profile attorney Dick DeGuerin as impeachment prosecutors.
