= Capturing the Friedmans =

2003 documentary film by Andrew Jarecki

- Theatrical release poster
- Directed by: Andrew Jarecki
- Produced by: Andrew Jarecki; Marc Smerling
- Starring: Arnold Friedman; Elaine Friedman; David Friedman; Jesse Friedman
- Cinematography: Adolfo Doring
- Edited by: Richard Hankin
- Music by: Andrea Morricone; Bill Harrington
- Production companies: HBO Documentary Films; Fortissimo Films
- Distributed by: Magnolia Pictures
- Release dates: January 17, 2003 (Sundance); May 30, 2003 (United States)
- Running time: 107 minutes
- Country: United States
- Language: English

Capturing the Friedmans is a 2003 documentary film directed by Andrew Jarecki for HBO Documentary Films. It focuses on the 1980s investigation of Arnold and Jesse Friedman for child molestation. The film premiered at the 2003 Sundance Film Festival where it received critical acclaim as well as the Grand Jury Prize: Documentary. The film went on to be nominated for the Academy Award for Best Documentary Feature.

== Production ==
Jarecki initially was making a short film, Just a Clown (which he later completed), about children's birthday party entertainers in New York City, including the popular clown David Friedman ("Silly Billy"). During his research, Jarecki learned that David Friedman's brother, Jesse, and his father, Arnold, had pleaded guilty to child sexual abuse, and the family had an archive of home movies. Jarecki interviewed some of the children involved and ended up making a film focusing on the Friedmans.

== Synopsis ==
The investigation into Arnold Friedman's life started in 1984, when the United States Postal Service intercepted a magazine of child pornography sent to him from the Netherlands. In 1987, investigators searched Arnold's home in Great Neck, New York, and found a collection of child pornography. Upon learning that Arnold taught computer classes for preteen boys in his home, authorities interviewed the students, some of whom alleged they had been subjected to physical and sexual abuse at the hands of Arnold and his youngest son, Jesse, a young adult who assisted Arnold with the classes. The two men were arrested and accused of committing hundreds of crimes, throwing the community into turmoil. They were eventually able to get out on bail and returned home to prepare for court, hanging their hopes for acquittal on the lack of physical evidence against them and reports of the coercive tactics and leading questions that had been used to question the students.

Around this time, Arnold's eldest son David purchased a camcorder and recorded hours of home videos during this period. The videos were not made with the intention of showing them to the public, but the film incorporates some of this footage, which consists of family dinners, conversations and arguments. While Arnold's three sons (Seth, the middle son, chose to not participate in the documentary) believed Arnold and Jesse were innocent, Elaine, Arnold's wife and the mother of the boys, was unsure of her husband's innocence and encouraged Arnold to confess, hoping that would somehow help Jesse's case. Arnold did plead guilty to multiple charges of sodomy and sexual abuse and was sentenced to prison. Jesse later also pled guilty; his charges were not reduced after his father's plea, but he said his father had molested him as a child to try to get a less severe sentence (Jesse has since stated that this was just a legal ploy).

After their pleas, both Arnold and Jesse said that no abuse had taken place during the computer classes, but they thought, given the media coverage of the case and the climate in Great Neck at the time, they would have been convicted and given harsher sentences if they had gone to trial. However, in a document Arnold wrote while under house arrest after he was bailed out of jail, he did claim that, when he was 13, he sexually abused his younger brother, Howard, who was eight years old at the time (Howard is interviewed in the film and says he does not remember being abused by his brother), and admitted to, as an adult, molesting two boys who were not his students (Jesse's lawyer, Peter Panaro, who visited Arnold in a Wisconsin federal prison, is interviewed in the film and says Arnold admitted this to him as well). Jesse, in a statement subsequent to the film, said his father also told him and his brothers that he sexually abused Howard.

Arnold Friedman died in prison in 1995 after taking an overdose of antidepressants, leaving a $250,000 life insurance benefit to Jesse. Jesse was released from New York's Clinton Correctional Facility in 2001 after serving thirteen years of his sentence. As of 2013, he was running an online book-selling business.

== Reception ==
=== Critical response ===
Capturing the Friedmans won the Grand Jury Prize for Documentary at the 2003 Sundance Film Festival and received predominantly positive reviews. On review aggregator website Rotten Tomatoes, it has an approval rating of 97% based on 153 reviews, with an average rating of 8.46/10; the website's critical consensus calls the film: "A haunting depiction of a disintegrating family, and a powerful argument on the elusiveness of truth". The film was ranked as the 7th best-reviewed movie of 2003 on the website's best of the year list. On Metacritic, it has a score of 90 out of 100, based on 39 critics, indicating "universal acclaim". The low-budget documentary was a success with audiences as well, its $3 million theatrical gross making it a surprise hit.

Elvis Mitchell of The New York Times wrote, "Mr. Jarecki so recognizes the archetypal figures in the Friedman home that he knows to push things any further through heavy-handed assessment would be redundant." He praised Jarecki for operating under the premise "that first impressions can't be trusted and that truth rests with each person telling the story." The Washington Post columnist Desson Howe offered similar praise, writing, "It's testament to Jarecki's superbly wrought film that everyone seems to be, simultaneously, morally suspect and strikingly innocent as they relate their stories and assertions ... This is a film about the quagmire of mystery in every human soul." Similarly, film critic Roger Ebert of The Chicago Sun-Times wrote, "The film is an instructive lesson about the elusiveness of facts, especially in a legal context. Sometimes guilt and innocence are discovered in court, but sometimes, we gather, only truths about the law are demonstrated." The film was voted the fifth film in the 2005 Channel 4 programme The 50 Greatest Documentaries.

In one of the few negative reviews, Los Angeles Times writer Kenneth Turan wrote a critique of both the film and Jarecki, stating: "Jarecki's pose of impartiality gets especially troublesome for audiences when it enables him to evade responsibility for dealing with the complexities of his material." Writing for The Village Voice, Debbie Nathan, who was hired by Jarecki as a consultant after having been interviewed for the film, said of Jarecki, "Polling viewers at Sundance in January, he was struck by how they were split over Arnold and Jesse's guilt. Since then, he's crafted a marketing strategy based on ambiguity, and during Q&As and interviews, he has studiously avoided taking a stand."

In his review, Ebert recounted Jarecki's statement at the Sundance Film Festival that he did not know whether Arnold and Jesse Friedman were guilty of child molestation and roundly praised Jarecki for communicating this ambiguity. Jarecki funded Jesse Friedman's appeal and in 2014 he renewed his defense saying, "At the time, Capturing the Friedmans was celebrated for its ambiguity, but if you look at the prosecution of this case, it was an unambiguous disaster... If the police and the DA hadn't bullied everyone, it never would have gotten to this place. I care a lot about this issue of child abuse, I take it very seriously. That's why I feel so strongly that when there are false claims about these kinds of crimes, they really undermine the entire system."

=== Criticism ===
Criticism intensified as Jarecki's choice not to pursue his firm belief in the Friedmans' innocence became publicly known. There was also a critical backlash due to footage Jarecki left out on purpose. Jarecki omitted a tearful confession of guilt Jesse Friedman made from prison on Geraldo Rivera's talk show in 1989; during the interview, he also detailed how his father had molested him as a child. Some of the Friedmans' alleged victims and family members wrote to the Awards Committee, protesting the Academy Award for Best Documentary Feature nomination.

=== Accolades ===
Year	Association	Category	Project	Result	Ref.
2003	Academy Award	Best Documentary Feature	Andrew Jarecki, and Marc Smerling	Nominated	
2003	Critics' Choice Movie Awards	Best Documentary	Capturing the Friedmans	Won	
2003	Directors Guild of America Awards	Outstanding Directing for a Documentary	Andrew Jarecki	Nominated	
2003	Los Angeles Film Critics Association	Best Documentary Film	Andrew Jarecki	Nominated	
2003	National Board of Review	Top Five Documentaries	Capturing the Freidmans	Won	
2003	National Board of Review	Freedom of Expression Award	Andrew Jarecki	Won	
2003	New York Film Critics Circle	Best Non-Fiction Film	Capturing the Freidmans	Won	
2003	Sundance Film Festival	Grand Jury Prize	Andrew Jarecki	Won	

== Additional materials ==
The 2003 DVD release of the film included a second DVD: "Capturing the Friedmans -- Outside the Frame". It included:

- additional home-video footage shot by the Friedmans
- numerous deleted and extended scenes from the film
- footage from Q&A sessions following screenings of the film
- updates on Jesse's life after he was released from prison
- Just a Clown, Jarecki's 20-minute short documentary featuring David Friedman that led to Capturing the Friedmans
- A ROM section with several documents from the family and the case

There was footage on the bonus disc of an altercation that occurred during a Q&A session following the film's screening at the Tribeca Film Festival, in which Frances Galasso, the retired head of the Nassau County Police's Sex Crimes Unit, argues with investigative journalist Debbie Nathan, as well as a speech by trial judge Abbey Boklan from the film's premiere in Great Neck. Both Galasso and Boklan claim the film excluded evidence that points to Jesse's guilt, such as his interview with Geraldo Rivera and the existence of Ross Goldstein, the third defendant, who served time in prison after pleading guilty to charges of child molestation and even named two additional co-conspirators, though they remained unindicted. (Goldstein is not named in the film, but it is said in one of the DVD extras that he declined to be interviewed. One of the unindicted co-conspirators claims in the same section that he and the fifth man were falsely accused by Goldstein.) During the Tribeca Q&A, Jesse's lawyer at the time of the case, Peter Panaro, said he advised Jesse not to appear on Rivera's talk show (Panaro was also present on the show), and even had Jesse sign an affidavit saying he was doing so against legal advice.

== Subsequent legal developments ==
In August 2010, a federal appeals court upheld the conviction of Jesse Friedman on technical legal grounds, but took the unusual step of urging prosecutors to reopen Friedman's case, saying that there was a "reasonable likelihood that Jesse Friedman was wrongfully convicted". The decision cited "overzealousness" by law enforcement officials swept up in the hysteria over child molestation in the 1980s.

Following the appeals court ruling, the Nassau District Attorney's office began a three-year investigation led by District Attorney Kathleen M. Rice. On June 24, 2013, the report was released. In a 155-page report, the district attorney's office concluded that none of four issues raised in a strongly-worded 2010 ruling by the United States Court of Appeals for the Second Circuit was substantiated by the evidence. Instead, it concluded, "By any impartial analysis, the reinvestigation process prompted by Jesse Friedman, his advocates and the Second Circuit, has only increased confidence in the integrity of Jesse Friedman's guilty plea and adjudication as a sex offender." Jesse Friedman was regarded as a "narcissist" and a "psychopathic deviant" by a psychiatrist his attorney hired to conduct an evaluation. Judge Boklan was said to have been subject to "selectively edited and misleading film portrayals in Capturing the Friedmans".

The work was guided and overseen by a four-member independent advisory panel, which included Barry Scheck, a founder of the Innocence Project, one of the country's leading advocates for overturning wrongful convictions, and a member of O. J. Simpson's defense team. However, Scheck has subsequently complained that key documents were not available to the panel, and urged the matter be reopened.

Prior to the report's release, new details emerged, including letters and affidavits from some of the alleged victims in which they recanted their accusations and implicated the police in coercing their statements.

The Village Voice conducted an interview with Jesse Friedman, who described himself as "freakishly optimistic", and also reported that his childhood friend Ross Goldstein, the third defendant in the case (not featured in the film), had broken his 25 year silence to explain he had been coerced into cooperating with the district attorney's office: "He told the review panel of how he'd been coerced into lying, how prosecutors coached him through details of the Friedmans' computer lab, which he'd never even seen, and how he was imprisoned for something he'd never done."

On February 10, 2015, Jesse Friedman was back in state appellate court seeking to have Nassau County prosecutors turn over to him the remainder of their evidence against him. That December, a state Appeals Court found that the prosecutors did not have to release the records. Because Friedman pled guilty and there was no trial, a spokesperson for the Nassau County District Attorney claimed the records of witnesses who did not testify are confidential, and the law does not mandate their disclosure. However, on November 27, 2017, the NYS Court of Appeals reversed the lower court, and overturned the DA's claim regarding "confidential witnesses", and ordered the lower court to oversee disclosure of Friedman case files to the defendant.

In March 2020, Jesse Friedman filed a federal civil rights lawsuit against Nassau County and several former law enforcement officials, alleging malicious prosecution and violation of due process. The case sought damages and the clearing of his name, but in 2022, a federal judge dismissed several counts while allowing others to proceed to trial. As of 2025, the litigation remains ongoing. Advocacy groups continue to campaign for a full exoneration, citing new psychological research on coerced confessions and false memories in child sex abuse cases.
