= John Waldron (lawyer) =

American lawyer

- Born: Philadelphia, Pennsylvania, U.S.
- Education: La Salle University (BA); Villanova University School of Law (JD)
- Occupation: Lawyer
- Employer(s): Waldron & Williams*
- Known for: Criminal Defense
- Website: ww-legal.com

John J. Waldron is an American lawyer based in Allentown, Pennsylvania and is best known for his work as a criminal defense attorney. His notable clients have included Robert Durst, Jamie Silvonek, George Juno, and James Alan Austin. He is known for his role during the Katheryn Deprill 'Burger King Baby' reunification case and for his representation of Stacey Esterly during the Kevin Esterly/Amy Yu affair. He is a founding partner at Huber, Waldron & Williams, a Lehigh Valley law firm, and a past board member of the Pennsylvania Association of Criminal Defense Lawyers.

== Early life ==
Waldron earned his undergraduate degree from La Salle University in 1978, where he finished magna cum laude. He obtained his Juris Doctor from Villanova University in 1982.

== Legal career ==
Waldron was admitted to the State Bar of Pennsylvania in 1984. After his admittance to the bar he worked as a prosecutor in Lehigh County under current Pennsylvania Superior Court Judge William H. Platt, who was the District Attorney at the time. In 1987 he cofounded Huber & Waldron with James T. Huber. The firm specializes in White Collar Criminal Defense, Homicide and Narcotic cases, Commercial Litigation, and Wrongful Death cases.

=== Robert Durst ===
In 2001, Waldron represented Robert Durst, a Manhattan Real Estate Heir, on his charges in Pennsylvania (Commonwealth of Pennsylvania v. Robert Durst, State of Texas v. Robert Durst). Durst was subject to speculation for his involvement with the murder and dismemberment of Morris Black, his neighbor in Galveston. Durst was sought by authorities in Texas and evaded capture for six weeks before his arrest in Bethlehem, Pennsylvania in December 2001. Waldron was featured on HBO's 2015 miniseries The Jinx.

=== Jaime Silvonek ===
Waldron also represented Jamie Silvonek one of the youngest females in Pennsylvania State history to be tried as an adult. In March 2015, Jamie Silvonek was indicated and arrested for her involvement in the murder of her mother, Cheryl Silvonek. Waldron argued that because of Silvoneks age, her intellectual capacities were still developing, which affected her impulse control and, more generally, her capacity for crime. Waldron has been featured on HLN's Nancy Grace and CNN's Primetime Justice with Ashleigh Banfield. He has also been highlighted in People, CBS, Huffington Post, and Fox News.

== Personal life ==
Waldron has three children.

== Awards and recognition ==
Waldron has been recognized as a Philadelphia Magazine "Super Lawyer".
