= Bobbi Bacha =

Texas-based private investigator

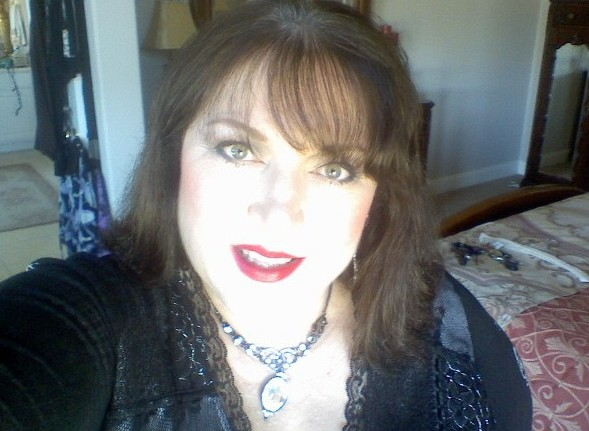

Bobbi Bacha is a Texas private investigator portrayed in 2004 TV Sony Pictures Movie Suburban Madness played by actress Sela Ward. Bacha also was involved and worked on the case of New York millionaire Robert Durst who was charged with murder in Galveston, Texas for killing his neighbor Morris Black but was found not guilty by a Galveston County Jury.

Bacha has been mentioned in several books:

- A Deadly Secret by Matt Birkbeck
- With Out a Trace by Marion Collins
- Out of Control by Steve Long
- Celebrity Murders

Magazine features Texas Monthly by Skip Hollandsworth article Suburban Madness, 002 Magazine, article Bayou City Blues and August 2008 article Snap. Bobbi Bacha has also been featured on 48 Hours, Dateline, Inside Edition, Good Morning America, The Early Show, Court TV, The O'Reilly Factor, CNN, Fox News, CBS, ABC as well as other national and world press.
