= Robert Durst =

American murderer (1943–2022)

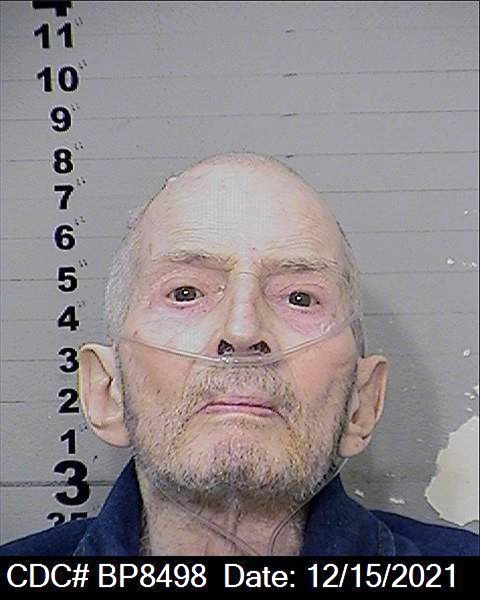
- Durst in 2021
- Born: Robert Alan Durst; April 12, 1943; New York City, U.S.
- Died: January 10, 2022 (aged 78); French Camp, California, U.S.
- Education: Lehigh University (BA)
- Spouses: Kathie McCormack (m. 1973; disappeared 1982); Debrah Charatan (m. 2000)
- Parents: Seymour Durst; Bernice Herstein
- Relatives: Douglas Durst (brother); Joseph Durst (grandfather)
- Status: Deceased
- Convictions: First-degree murder (2021); Illegally possessing a firearm (2016); Criminal mischief (2014); Tampering with evidence and bail jumping (2004)
- Criminal charge: Second-degree murder (2021; died before trial)
- Penalty: Life imprisonment without the possibility of parole (2021); 7 years and 1 month in prison (2016); $500 fine (2014); 5 years in prison (2004)

Details
- Span of crimes: 2000 – 2015 confirmed 1971 - 2015 suspected
- Country: United States
- States: California, Texas (confirmed); New York, Vermont (suspected)
- Killed: 3-6 (1 conviction)
- Date apprehended: For the final time on March 14, 2015

Robert Alan Durst (April 12, 1943 – January 10, 2022) was an American real estate heir. The eldest son of New York City real estate magnate Seymour Durst, he garnered attention as a suspect in the unsolved 1982 disappearance of his first wife, Kathleen McCormack; the 2000 murder of his longtime friend, Susan Berman; and the 2001 killing of neighbor Morris Black. Durst was also investigated in connection with several other unsolved disappearances and murders dating back to 1971.

Acquitted of murdering Black in 2003, Durst did not face further legal action until his participation in the documentary miniseries The Jinx (2015) led to him being charged with Berman's murder. He was convicted in 2021 and sentenced to life imprisonment without parole. Durst was also charged with McCormack's murder shortly after his sentencing, but died in 2022 before a trial could begin. His conviction for Berman's murder was vacated upon his death because his appeal was still pending.

== Early life ==
Robert Alan Durst was born in New York City on April 12, 1943, and grew up in Scarsdale, New York. He was the eldest son of real estate magnate Seymour Durst and his wife, Bernice Herstein. His paternal grandfather, Joseph Durst, originally a Jewish tailor from Austria-Hungary, immigrated to the United States in 1902 and eventually became a real estate manager and developer, founding the Durst Organization in 1927. His three younger siblings were Douglas, Tommy and Wendy Durst.

When Durst was seven years old, his mother died by suicide after jumping from the roof of the family's Scarsdale home. He later claimed to have witnessed the act, asserting that moments before her death, his father walked him to a window from which he could see her standing on the roof. However, in a March 2015 New York Times interview, Durst's brother Douglas denied that he had witnessed the suicide. As children, Robert and Douglas underwent counseling for sibling rivalry; a 1953 psychiatrist's report on Durst, then ten years old, mentioned "personality decomposition and possibly even schizophrenia."

Durst attended Scarsdale High School, where classmates described him as a loner. He earned a bachelor's degree in economics in 1965 from Lehigh University, where he was a member of the varsity lacrosse team and the business manager of the student newspaper, The Brown and White. Later that year, Durst enrolled in a doctoral program at the University of California, Los Angeles, where he met Susan Berman, but eventually withdrew from the school and returned to New York in 1969.

Durst opened a small health-food store in Vermont in the early 1970s. He closed the store in 1973, when his father pressured him to return to New York and work in the Durst Organization. In 1992, due to Durst's erratic behavior, his father broke with tradition and appointed his second son, Douglas, to take over the company. As the firstborn, Durst felt entitled to run the company despite his disdain for it and accused Douglas of stealing what was rightfully owed to him. This resulted in Robert's estrangement from the rest of his family. He eventually sued for his share of the Durst fortune, and was bought out of the family trust for $65 million in 2006.

== Capital crimes for which Durst was investigated ==
For most of his adult life, Durst was the subject of investigation and speculation concerning three alleged crimes: the 1982 disappearance of his wife, Kathleen "Kathie" McCormack; the 2000 murder of his longtime friend, Susan Berman; and the 2001 death of his neighbor, Morris Black. Durst was ultimately tried and acquitted for murder in the Black case but was later convicted in the Berman case.

=== Disappearance of Kathleen McCormack Durst ===
In late 1971, Durst met dental hygienist Kathleen McCormack. After two dates, he invited her to move into his home in Vermont, which she did in January 1972. After his father pressured him to return to New York to work in the Durst Organization, the couple moved to Manhattan, where they married on April 12, 1972.

At the time of her disappearance, McCormack was a medical student in her fourth and final year at the Albert Einstein College of Medicine, hoping to become a pediatrician—she was only a few months short of earning her degree. She was last seen by someone other than Durst on the evening of January 31, 1982, when she appeared unexpectedly at a dinner party, thrown by her friend Gilberte Najamy in Newtown, Connecticut. Najamy noticed that McCormack seemed upset and was wearing red sweatpants, which Najamy found odd, as she never dressed so casually in public. After receiving a phone call from her husband, McCormack left for her cottage in South Salem, New York.

Although the couple was known to have fought that evening, Durst initially maintained that he had placed his wife on a commuter train to New York City at Katonah rail station, had a drink with a neighbor and spoken to his wife at their Manhattan apartment by telephone later that evening. "That's what I told police," he later said. "I was hoping that would just make everything go away." Durst subsequently admitted he just went home and went to bed.

McCormack and Najamy were scheduled to meet the next day at The Lion's Gate, a Manhattan pub. When McCormack failed to appear, Najamy grew concerned and repeatedly called police over the course of several days. Later that week, Durst reported his wife missing.

Both a doorman and the building superintendent at the couple's apartment on Riverside Drive claimed to have seen McCormack at the building on February 1, the day after she was last indisputably seen. However, the doorman admitted he had only seen her from behind and from half a block away, and thus could not be certain that it was her. A private investigator hired by Durst's lawyer later reported that the doorman said he had not seen McCormack arrive at all, and might not have been working the night she disappeared.

Three weeks before her disappearance, McCormack had been treated at the Jacobi Medical Center in the Bronx for facial bruises. She told a friend that Durst had beaten her, but did not press charges over the incident. McCormack asked Durst for a $250,000 divorce settlement. Instead, he cancelled her credit card, removed her name from a joint bank account and refused to pay her medical school tuition. At the time of McCormack's disappearance, Durst had been dating Mia Farrow's younger sister Prudence for three years and was living in a separate apartment.

When one of McCormack's friends and her sister learned of her disappearance, they broke into her South Salem cottage, hoping to find her. Instead, they discovered the residence ransacked, McCormack's mail unopened and her belongings in the trash. Durst initially offered a $100,000 reward for his wife's return, then reduced the reward to $15,000. Only three weeks after Durst had reported his wife missing, the superintendent on Riverside Drive found some of her possessions in the building's trash compactor.

==== Investigation and aftermath ====
After McCormack's disappearance, the New York City Police Department (NYPD) stated that Durst had claimed to have last spoken to her when she called him from the Riverside Drive apartment. He maintained that the last time he had seen her was at Katonah station, where she was planning to board a 9:15pm train to Manhattan. He also claimed that on February 4, the supervisor at McCormack's medical school telephoned him to say she had been absent from class all week after calling in sick on February 1. Whether McCormack herself had made that call is unknown.

Durst divorced McCormack eight years after her disappearance, claiming spousal abandonment. In 2016, McCormack's family asked to have her declared legally dead, a request that was granted the following year. Her mother, Ann McCormack, attempted to sue Durst for $100 million, alleging that he had murdered her daughter and deprived her parents of the right to bury her. McCormack's parents have since died. Her younger sister, Mary McCormack Hughes, also believes that Durst murdered her. The New York State Police quietly reopened the criminal investigation into McCormack's disappearance in 1999, searching the South Salem cottage for the first time. The investigation became public in November 2000.

In August 2019, a wrongful death lawsuit against Durst, filed by another of McCormack's sisters, Carol Bamonte, was dismissed on the grounds that she had waited too long to sue. In 2018, the U.S. Court of Appeals had revised the date of McCormack's death to match the date she disappeared in January 1982. On May 17, 2021, during Durst's trial for Berman's murder, Westchester County District Attorney Mimi Rocah announced that McCormack's disappearance had been reclassified as murder and would be reinvestigated. In October 2021, shortly after Durst's first-degree murder conviction in the Berman case, Westchester County prosecutors announced they would empanel a grand jury to explore charges against Durst in the McCormack case. He was officially charged with her murder on October 22, 2021.

=== Murder of Susan Berman ===
Susan Berman, a longtime friend of Durst's who had facilitated his public alibi after McCormack's disappearance, was the daughter of David Berman, a major Jewish-American organized crime figure who dominated illegal gambling in Depression-era Minneapolis and later took over the Flamingo Hotel and Casino on the Las Vegas Strip. On December 24, 2000, Berman was found murdered execution-style in her home in the Benedict Canyon neighborhood of Los Angeles after her neighbors called police to report that her door was open and one of her dogs was loose.

Several days after the discovery, a letter addressed to the Beverly Hills Police Department, postmarked December 23, contained Berman's address and the word "cadaver." On the envelope, "Beverly" was misspelled as "Beverley." Durst is known to have been in Northern California days before Berman's death and to have flown to New York from San Francisco the night before her body was discovered. Berman had recently received $50,000 from Durst in two payments. Although he confirmed to the Los Angeles Police Department (LAPD) that he had sent Berman $25,000, and faxed investigators a copy of her 1982 deposition regarding his missing wife, he declined to be further questioned about the murder.

Durst claimed in a 2005 deposition that Berman called him shortly before her death to inform him that the LAPD wanted to interview her about McCormack's disappearance. A study of case notes by The Guardian cast doubt on whether the LAPD had made such a call, or whether then-Westchester County District Attorney Jeanine Pirro had scheduled an interview with Berman at all. After being tipped off by his sister Wendy that the McCormack investigation had been reopened, Durst went into hiding and moved to Galveston, Texas, disguising himself as a mute woman to avoid police inquiries. Berman biographer Cathy Scott has asserted that Durst killed her because she had incriminating knowledge about his wife's disappearance.

=== Killing and dismemberment of Morris Black ===
On October 9, 2001, Durst was arrested in Galveston shortly after dismembered body parts belonging to his elderly neighbor, 71-year-old Morris Black, were found floating in Galveston Bay. He was released on $250,000 bail and missed a court hearing on October 16, and a warrant was issued for his arrest on a charge of bail jumping.

On November 30, Durst was caught inside a Wegmans supermarket in Bethlehem, Pennsylvania, after trying to shoplift Band-Aids, a newspaper and a chicken salad sandwich, despite having $500 in cash in his pocket. Among the items discovered in his rental car were $37,000 in cash, two guns, marijuana, Black's driver's license and directions to Gilberte Najamy's home in Connecticut. Durst also used his time on the run to stalk his brother Douglas, visiting the driveway of his home in Katonah, New York, while armed. Durst employed defense attorney John Waldron while he was held on charges in Pennsylvania. He was eventually extradited to Texas for trial.

== Black trial ==
In 2003, Durst was tried for the murder of Morris Black. On the death of Black, the prosecution presented the jury with only a charge of capital murder, with no lesser murder or manslaughter charges. Durst employed defense attorney Dick DeGuerin and claimed self-defense; DeGuerin conducted two mock trials in preparation for the case. Durst's defense team found communicating with him to be difficult and hired psychiatrist Milton Altschuler to examine him. After spending seventy hours examining Durst, Altschuler diagnosed him with Asperger syndrome, saying, "His whole life's history is so compatible with a diagnosis of Asperger's disorder." His defense team argued at trial that the diagnosis explained his behavior.

Durst claimed that Black grabbed his .22 caliber target pistol from its hiding place and threatened him with it. During the struggle for the pistol, the weapon discharged and shot Black in the face. Under cross-examination, Durst admitted to using a paring knife, two saws and an axe to dismember Black's body before bagging and dumping his remains in Galveston Bay. Black's head was never recovered, so prosecutors were unable to present sufficient forensic evidence to dispute Durst's account of the struggle. As a result of the lack of forensic evidence, the jury acquitted Durst of murder on November 11, 2003.

On December 21, 2004, Durst pleaded guilty to two counts of bail jumping and one count of evidence tampering (for his dismemberment of Black's body). As part of a plea bargain, he received a sentence of five years and was given credit for time served, requiring him to serve three years in prison. Durst was paroled on July 15, 2005. The rules of his release required him to stay near his home; permission was required to travel. That December, Durst made an unauthorized trip to the boarding house where Black was killed and to a nearby shopping mall. At the mall, he ran into former Galveston trial judge Susan Criss, who had presided over his trial. Due to this incident, the Texas Board of Pardons and Paroles determined that Durst had violated the terms of his parole and returned him to jail. He was released again from custody on March 1, 2006.

Asked in March 2015 whether she believed Durst murdered Black, Criss commented: "You could see that this person knew what they were doing and that it was not a first time. The body was cut perfectly like a surgeon who knew how to use this tool on this bone and a certain kind of tool on that muscle. It looked like not a first-time job. That was pretty scary." Private investigator Bobbi Bacha argues Black had known Durst years prior and was likely involved in McCormack's disappearance in 1982.

== Jarecki programs ==
Durst's notoriety inspired the film All Good Things (2010), the title of which is a reference to the Vermont health-food store of the same name set up by Durst and McCormack in the 1970s. David Marks, the character based on Durst, was portrayed by Ryan Gosling, and his wife Kathie was portrayed by Kirsten Dunst. Shortly after its theatrical release, Durst contacted director Andrew Jarecki and expressed his approval for the film, which evolved into discussions between the two of them being included on the DVD video release, and eventually resulting in Jarecki co-writing, co-producing, directing and appearing in the documentary miniseries The Jinx: The Life and Deaths of Robert Durst (2015), which was broadcast on HBO.

During filming of The Jinx, Berman's stepson uncovered a 1999 letter written by Durst which contained the same "Beverley Hills" typographical error as the anonymous letter directing police to her body, implicating Durst in the murder. Jarecki and producers Marc Smerling and Zac Stuart-Pontier realized they had uncovered potential criminal evidence and delivered the second letter to the Los Angeles County District Attorney's office. The new information led to Durst's indictment for the first-degree murder of Berman. The Federal Bureau of Investigation (FBI) arrested Durst in New Orleans on the eve of the broadcast of the final episode of The Jinx.

The Jinx ends with Durst moving into a bathroom, where his microphone records him seemingly saying to himself: "There it is. You're caught! .... You're right, of course. But you can't imagine the rest of them. ... I don't know what's in the house ... Oh, I want this ... What a disaster ... He was right. I was wrong. And the burping ... I'm having difficulty with the question ... What the hell did I do? Killed them all, of course." It was later disclosed in 2019 that the filmmakers altered the sequence of Durst's comments, increasing the apparent severity of his musings in the bathroom. In November 2023, HBO announced that The Jinx – Part Two, a six-episode continuation of the series, was in production with the same producers and director. It premiered on April 21, 2024. Part Two covers the eight years between the original series in 2015 to present time, including new interviews, hidden material and Durst's phone calls from prison.

== Berman trial ==
=== 2015 arrest ===
On March 14, 2015, a few days after a first-degree murder warrant was signed by a Los Angeles judge alleging a role by Durst in relation to the Berman killing, Durst was arrested by FBI agents at the JW Marriott in New Orleans, where he had registered under the false name "Everette Ward." Durst, who had been tracked to the hotel after making two calls to check his voicemail, was observed wandering aimlessly in the lobby and mumbling to himself, having driven to New Orleans from Houston four days before.

In addition to a .38 caliber revolver loaded with four live rounds and one spent shell casing, police recovered five ounces of marijuana; Durst's birth certificate and passport; maps of Louisiana, Florida and Cuba; a "flesh-toned" latex mask; the fake Texas ID card used to check into the hotel; a new cell phone; and cash totaling $42,631. Police discovered a UPS tracking number, which led to an additional $117,000 cash and a pair of shoes in a package sent to Durst by a friend in New York, which was seized after his arrest. Bank statements found in one of Durst's Houston condominia revealed cash withdrawals of $315,000 in little more than a month. Durst is believed to have planned to flee to Cuba after The Jinx aired, since the United States and Cuba have no extradition treaty.

On March 15, New York State Police investigator Joseph Becerra, long involved with the McCormack case and said to have been working closely with the FBI and LAPD detectives, removed some sixty file boxes of Durst's personal papers and effects from the home of Durst's friend, Susan T. Giordano, in Campbell Hall, New York. All of these items had been sent to Giordano for safekeeping three years prior by Durst's then-wife, Debrah Lee Charatan. Also stored at Giordano's residence were videotaped depositions of Durst, his brother Douglas and Charatan, all of which were related to the Black case.

Los Angeles County Deputy District Attorney John Lewin, in charge of prosecuting Durst, immediately flew to New Orleans after his arrest. With Durst's permission, Lewin interviewed him for three hours without a lawyer present. The recorded questioning was later introduced as evidence in the Berman trial. In regards to the investigation, Lewin claimed to have found information uncovered by the filmmakers of The Jinx to be compelling, and repeatedly flew to New York to interview witnesses, including friends of Durst and Berman.

=== Firearm charge ===
On March 16, 2015, DeGuerin advised court authorities in New Orleans that Durst waived extradition and would voluntarily return to California. Later that same day, the Louisiana State Police filed charges against Durst for being a felon in possession of a firearm and for possession of a firearm with a controlled substance, forestalling his immediate return to California. Orleans Parish District Attorney Leon Cannizzaro commented, in light of prior convictions that could influence Durst's sentencing, "[j]ust for those gun charges here in Louisiana, [Durst] could face up to life in prison."

On March 23, Durst was denied bail by a Louisiana judge after prosecutors argued he was a flight risk. In an effort to hasten his extradition to California and avoid a protracted court battle in Louisiana, DeGuerin raised questions about the validity of the New Orleans arrest and hotel room search, observing a local judge did not issue a warrant until hours after his client was detained. While communicating with the LAPD and conducting an inventory of Durst's hotel room possessions, "[t]he FBI ... held him there, incommunicado, for almost eight hours". According to DeGuerin, Durst was questioned extensively by a Los Angeles prosecutor and detective, without a lawyer present, on the morning after his arrest.

In failing to produce the arresting officers subpoenaed for a probable cause hearing, Durst's attorneys charged that Louisiana prosecutors engaged in a "misguided attempt to conceal the facts from the court, the defendant, and the public." Peter Mansfield, an Assistant United States Attorney, stated that his office instructed the two FBI agents and arresting officer not to appear, arguing that DeGuerin's subpoenas were issued in an attempt to conduct "actions against them in their official capacities for the purpose of obtaining testimony, information and material maintained under color of their official duties."

On April 8, a day after the U.S. Attorney filed an independent federal weapons charge, Durst was formally indicted by a Louisiana grand jury for carrying a weapon with a controlled substance and for the illegal possession of a firearm by a felon. Later that month, his lawyers requested that more than $193,000 seized by authorities during their searches be returned, saying the cash "is not needed as evidence, is not contraband, and is not subject to forfeiture."

After negotiations with Durst's defense team, Louisiana authorities ultimately dropped weapons charges against Durst on April 23. His trial on the federal weapons charge was scheduled for September 21. DeGuerin confirmed rumors Durst was in poor health, stating he suffered from hydrocephalus and had a shunt put into his skull two years before, as well as spinal surgery and a cancerous mass removed from his esophagus.

Durst's attorneys requested a later date for the federal weapons trial, saying they would need more time to prepare after rulings on pending motions. U.S. District Judge Helen Berrigan later rescheduled the trial to January 11, 2016. On November 16, 2015, a New Orleans federal judge ordered Durst rearraigned on the weapons charges and scheduled a hearing for December 17. When asked, Durst's attorney said only that Durst did not kill Berman and that he wanted to resolve the other charges to expedite Durst's extradition to Los Angeles to face that charge.

On December 16, 2015, prosecutors and defense attorneys told Berrigan in a joint motion that scheduling conflicts ruled out all dates before a January 11 trial date. Berrigan ultimately rescheduled the trial for February 3, 2016, and Durst changed his plea to guilty to the federal gun charge and received an eighty-five-month prison sentence.

=== 2020 trial ===
Durst's trial for the murder of Susan Berman was scheduled to begin in Los Angeles after Durst was arraigned in California, but his transfer was delayed by the U.S. Bureau of Prisons due to "serious surgery," according to DeGuerin. A conditional hearing was convened in February 2017, where Nick Chavin, a close friend of Durst's and at whose wedding Durst served as best man, testified that he had personally confided to having murdered Berman. A preliminary hearing was initially scheduled for October 2017, but was postponed to April 2018 to accommodate Durst's defense team, some of whom suffered damage to their homes and offices from Hurricane Harvey.

The pretrial hearings included extensive testimony from a number of older witnesses who potentially would not be available when the trial itself began. In October 2018, Los Angeles County Superior Court Judge Mark Windham ruled that enough evidence existed to try Durst for the murder of Berman, and that he would be arraigned November 8. During his court appearance the following day, Durst pleaded not guilty. In January 2019, Windham set Durst's trial date as September 3, 2019.

At the same time, Judge Windham ruled that prosecutors could present evidence involving the Black murder. Prosecutors would try to connect Berman's death with McCormack's disappearance, which they argued was the foundation for the motive for the murder. In his ruling that prosecutors could use evidence from the Black case, Judge Windham said the killings of Black and Berman seemed "to be intertwined." The murder charge against Durst included the special circumstance allegations of lying in wait and killing a witness to a crime. It was further alleged that Durst had used a handgun to carry out the murder.

In May 2019, a motion filed by Durst's attorneys claimed two handwriting samples (the anonymous "cadaver note" to Beverly Hills police, and a letter in 1999 from Durst to Berman), along with other evidence from his 2015 arrests, were obtained in violation of the Fourth Amendment, thus moving for their exclusion. On May 8, Los Angeles County prosecutors filed an affidavit replying to the motion, charging that Durst was creating an elaborate conspiracy theory between the HBO filmmakers, law enforcement officers and the Los Angeles County District Attorney's office to make Durst "incriminate himself." On May 17, Windham granted Durst's defense team a four-month postponement of his trial after they raised concerns about the volume of evidence in the case and conflicts with attorney schedules.

On September 3, 2019, Windham rejected an attempt by Durst's attorneys to strip the producers of The Jinx of protection under California's journalist shield law by having them declared "government agents." A number of other procedural rulings also went against Durst. Lewin set another hearing on discovery and other matters for October 28. Additional evidential hearings were held in December 2019 regarding the admissibility of statements Durst made in March 2015 just after his arrest in New Orleans, in an interview with Lewin.

In a surprise move on December 24, 2019, Durst's lawyers contradicted his previous statements and filed court documents admitting that Durst wrote the "cadaver note." In all previous statements Durst had consistently denied writing the note, although the handwriting appeared to be similar to his own as was the misspelling of the word "Beverley" contained in a prior letter to Berman that Durst admitted to authoring. During the filming of The Jinx, Durst told the filmmakers that the person who wrote the "cadaver note" was taking a "big risk" because it was something "that only the killer could have written." Durst told his godson, Howard Altman, "The person who wrote the note killed her." However, in August 2019, Durst's attorneys also argued, "What the note demonstrates is that the person who mailed it was aware that there was a body at the house, not that the individual murdered Susan Berman."

On March 2, 2020, Durst appeared in court to begin his trial, which was expected to take several months. However, the proceedings were postponed amid the COVID-19 pandemic. In June 2020, a motion by the defense for a mistrial because of the delay was denied. The following month, Windham ruled that a further delay until April 2021 was necessary due to the pandemic, but he would allow the trial to proceed if Durst agreed to a bench trial, without a jury. Durst declined this option and the trial was scheduled to resume on April 12, 2021. It was then postponed until May 17, 2021.

On May 13, 2021, Durst's lawyers filed a motion with the court saying Durst had developed bladder cancer, and moved that the court postpone the trial indefinitely and to release him on bail to receive medical treatment that was currently being provided. The motion was denied by the court and the trial resumed on May 17, with Windham questioning jurors about whether they could still remain neutral in the case after a fourteen-month break.

On June 10, Durst was hospitalized after being found "down and not in his wheelchair." Windham sent the jury home with plans to resume on June 14. Lewin expressed suspicion that the defendant was faking a medical crisis to force a mistrial because he was "on record" in his calls from county jail saying he intended to feign dementia or seek a mistrial due to COVID-19. "I have no idea whether this is legitimate or not, but obviously, given his history, it's certainly suspect as to what his actual condition is," Lewin said. Noting that Durst's lawyers had twice sought mistrials during the previous day's testimony, the prosecutor added, "It's very clear the defense and the defendant want this trial to go away." Prison doctors determined Durst was able to appear in court after the emergency hospitalization, which was for a urinary tract infection and sepsis, and Windham reconvened the trial on June 14. Durst appeared in court in his wheelchair, attached to a catheter bag and covered in a large blanket.

As testimony continued, Durst's brother Douglas appeared as a prosecution witness on June 28. Saying he was reluctant to appear at the trial and was doing so under threat of subpoena, Douglas was asked about his relationship with his brother: "He'd like to murder me. I hired security today. I have fear that my brother has threatened to kill me, and I have fear that he may have the means to do so."

On July 29, Durst's defense team asked again for an emergency halt to the case based on his poor medical condition, saying he was not able to testify on his own behalf, but was again rejected on August 2, with Windham giving numerous examples of Durst's competency. The prosecution closed its case against Durst after eleven weeks of presenting evidence primarily consisting of friends and associates of Berman's saying she had admitted providing Durst's alibi after McCormack's disappearance. Chavin testified that Durst told him, "I had to. It was [Berman] or me. I had no choice."

The defense opened up its case with extensive testimony from "false memory" expert Elizabeth Loftus, questioning the decades-long recollections of prosecution witnesses. Although highly unusual for a murder case, Durst himself was expected to testify on his own behalf on August 5, but court was adjourned until August 9 due to a positive COVID-19 test of a relative of Durst's legal team who had been attending the trial. Durst appeared on the stand for fourteen days, under questioning from Lewin, who gave seemingly endless examples of Durst's propensity to lie. Lewin cornered Durst to the point he admitted lying while under oath during the Black trial, and that he lied five times while on the stand in the present trial. Durst and Loftus were the only witnesses the defense called. On September 14, the jury was charged with reaching a verdict by Windham.

On September 17, 2021, Robert Durst was convicted for the first-degree murder of Susan Berman; Durst thus faced the possibility of a life sentence. He was also found guilty of multiple special charges. His lawyers promised to pursue "all avenues of appeal." On September 24, Durst's lawyers filed a motion with Windham to request a new trial. The reasoning was basically the same as they gave in Durst's trial defense: no physical evidence was presented, witnesses for the prosecution were not to be believed and the entire prosecution case was nothing but an unproven theory.

On October 14, Durst was sentenced to life imprisonment without the possibility of parole for Berman's murder. The request from Durst for a new trial was denied by the court in view of the abundance of evidence of his guilt. Following the conviction, Durst's legal team immediately filed appeals in the California legal system. As such, his appeals would be dismissed by the California Court of Appeal, and the conviction set aside, as his death prevented the appeals from being heard.

== Additional cases ==
Days after Berman's murder, police were reportedly examining connections between Durst and the disappearances of 18-year-old Lynne Schulze from Middlebury, Vermont, and 16-year-old Karen Mitchell from Eureka, California. Investigators were also considering a possible connection between Durst and the disappearance of 18-year-old Kristen Modafferi, who was last seen in San Francisco in 1997.

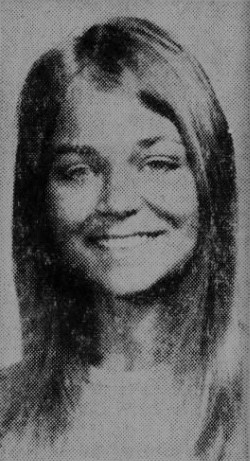
Lynne Schulze

Schulze, a Middlebury College freshman, visited Durst's health-food store on December 10, 1971, the day she disappeared, and was last seen that afternoon near a bus stop across from the store. Author and investigative journalist Matt Birkbeck reported in 2003, and again in his 2015 book A Deadly Secret, that credit card records placed Durst in Eureka on November 25, 1997, the day Mitchell vanished. Mitchell may have volunteered in a homeless shelter that Durst frequented; Durst, dressed in women's clothing, had visited the Eureka shoe store owned by Mitchell's aunt. Mitchell was last seen walking to work from her aunt's store and possibly speaking to someone in a stopped car; a witness sketch of Mitchell's presumed abductor resembles Durst.

Although the FBI ultimately could not connect Durst to the Long Island serial murders (in which some victims were disposed of in a similar manner to the Black killing), the bureau created an informal task force in 2012 to work with investigative agencies in jurisdictions where Durst was known to have lived in past decades, including Vermont, New York and California. In the wake of his arrest, the FBI encouraged such localities to reexamine cold cases. Texas private investigator Bobbi Bacha has also traced Durst operating under stolen identities in Texas, Florida, Massachusetts, New Jersey, South Carolina, Mississippi and Virginia.

== Personal life ==
On December 11, 2000, shortly before the Berman killing, Durst married Debrah Lee Charatan. According to The New York Times, the couple had briefly shared a Fifth Avenue apartment in 1990 but "have never lived together as husband and wife." Durst told his sister Wendy that it was "a marriage of convenience"; "I wanted Debbie to be able to receive my inheritance, and I intended to kill myself," Durst said in a 2005 deposition. When Durst was arrested for the Black killing in 2001, Charatan wired him the $250,000 bail the court required. She also visited Durst in jail and spoke with him on the phone on a regular basis, discussing his legal strategy and other personal and business issues. Following the Black trial, Charatan reportedly distanced herself from Durst and his affairs, legal and otherwise. In particular, Charatan specifically told Durst not to involve himself with production of The Jinx, to which he disagreed at the time. Charatan's friends said that, as of Durst's arrest in 2015, she had not spoken with him since the documentary had begun airing in February.

Despite still being married to Durst, Charatan was reported to be living with Stephen I. Holm in 2015. Holm was a real estate attorney in the New York City area who handled transactions for both Durst and Charatan. Charatan and Holm were also involved with several philanthropic ventures together. It was reported in Real Estate Weekly that Holm died on October 17, 2019, and that Charatan was his wife. Charatan was identified as Holm's wife at his funeral, in his obituary online and in his obituary in the Times. Shortly after, Charatan sent the Times a letter saying she and Holm were not married and asked them to print a retraction.

Shortly after Durst's conviction in the Berman case, a lawyer for McCormack's family sent a letter to Manhattan District Attorney Cyrus Vance Jr., claiming the marriage between Durst and Charatan was a sham solely to aid and abet Durst's murders and financial crimes, and to conceal those acts and frustrate investigation into same. The letter asked Vance's office to investigate these claims, as well as the issue of Durst's alleged bigamy due to Charatan's publicly claimed marriage to Holm. The letter was the second time the McCormack family asked for the Manhattan District Attorney's office to look into these issues, the first being March 2020.

Durst traveled and lived under dozens of aliases over the years, using different identities to buy motor vehicles, rent apartments and open credit card accounts. "He had a scanner, copier, and a laminating machine," a former office employee of Durst told Newsweek. "What I didn't realize is that I unwittingly saw what would have allowed Robert Durst to make a fake driver's license." Durst was "a prolific user of private mailboxes," and apparently conducted business under a number of canine-themed names: Woofing LLC, WoofWoof LLC and Igor-Fayette Inc.

In the early 1980s, Durst owned a series of seven Alaskan Malamutes, all of which were named Igor and all of which died in mysterious circumstances, according to his brother Douglas. In December 2014, prior to the airing of The Jinx, Douglas told the Times: "In retrospect, I now believe he was practicing killing and disposing [of] his wife with those dogs." Durst was once recorded saying he wanted to "Igor" Douglas. Durst, however, has disputed the assertion that he owned seven dogs named Igor; he owned three, he said, one that was run over and another that died in surgery after eating an apple core, "before the Igor that lasted forever."

From 2015 on, Durst had a number of significant medical issues, including major surgeries for esophageal cancer, having a shunt installed in his brain for hydrocephalus and cervical spinal fusion. When arrested in New Orleans in 2015, he was found to be in possession of a variety of medications, including the sleep aid melatonin, a muscle relaxant and medications for high blood pressure, blood flow and acid reflux. During the Berman murder trial, Durst's lawyers told the court he had bladder cancer.

On October 16, 2021, Durst tested positive for COVID-19 and was placed on a ventilator. At his sentencing two days prior, Dick DeGuerin said Durst was in "very bad condition," having a hard time breathing and speaking. It was unknown how Durst contracted the virus and whether anyone else at the sentencing had been infected.

=== Financial status and residences ===
In mid-2002, Durst signed over a power of attorney to Charatan, and their holdings are thought to have remained closely intermingled. In 2006, Durst gave Charatan around $20 million of his $65 million trust settlement. In 2011, Durst purchased a $1.75 million townhouse on Lenox Avenue in Harlem. A source close to the Durst family confirmed that he was living there at least some of the time and that they were keeping him under surveillance. Durst also owned three condominia in a multistory complex in Houston, and after filing suit received a $200,000 settlement in 2006 from a Houston developer who refused to let him move into a unit newly purchased by his wife, which she had then immediately resold to Durst for $10. At the time of Berman's murder in 2000, Durst had just sold a home in Trinidad, California, but maintained an office in Eureka while renting in nearby Big Lagoon.

Media outlets variously reported Durst's financial status as "real-estate baron," "rich scion," "millionaire," "multimillionaire" and "billionaire." As of 2021, the Durst family's real estate holdings are worth more than $8 billion, but Durst's brother Douglas has been in control of the Durst Organization since the early 1990s. From about 1994 to 2006, Durst waged a legal campaign to gain greater control of the family trust and fortune. During that time, he received $2 million a year from the trust. In 2006, the case was settled, with Durst giving up any interest in his family's properties and trusts in exchange for a one-time payment of about $65 million. How much of that went to legal fees and taxes is unknown. Durst remained active in real estate; he reportedly sold two properties in 2014 for $21.15 million after purchasing them in 2011 for $8.65 million. At the time of his 2015 arrest, the FBI estimated Durst's net worth at approximately $100 million; The Times estimated his net worth at $110 million.

On May 1, 2015, the New York Post reported that Douglas had settled litigation against Jarecki, having confirmed that Durst was the source of videotaped depositions that appeared in The Jinx. Durst's disclosure apparently violated the terms of his 2006 agreement with the family, which had disbursed to him a lump sum of trust assets. Whether Jarecki confirmed Durst as his source was unclear—the Times reported in March 2015 that he was given "unrestricted access" to Durst's personal records, including the videotaped material—but the settlement paved the way for Douglas to reclaim as much as $74 million of his brother's assets, effectively freezing those assets pending court judgment. This would potentially affect Durst's ability to pay for high-caliber legal representation without tapping into real estate or other investments. The Post reported that Douglas was "mulling his next move," but no legal action had been taken.

In November 2015, McCormack's mother and three sisters sued Durst for $100 million, citing his apparent role in her murder and his denial to her family of the "right to sepulcher", a New York law that grants immediate relatives access to a deceased person's body and the opportunity to determine appropriate burial. If successful, the lawsuit would have relieved Durst's estate of most or all of the fortune he inherited. McCormack's brother James had attempted in October 2015 to file a wrongful death suit against Durst on behalf of his mother, but was challenged by one of his sisters, who held her mother's power of attorney. On December 7, 2015, the same family members filed a suit asking the court to freeze Durst's assets. The family's attorney, Robert Abrams, called Durst the "poster child" for why courts block defendants from disposing of assets while civil lawsuits are pending. In July 2016, the family asked the Surrogate's Court in Manhattan to "declare that Kathie died on January 31, 1982, when she was murdered by her husband, Robert Durst" so the sepulcher lawsuit could proceed. The court granted the request and McCormack was declared dead in absentia in 2017.

In 2021, Durst was among those listed in the Pandora Papers leak, exposing the offshore sheltering of financial assets by hundreds of politicians, business figures and celebrities.

=== Other legal issues ===
In 2012 and 2013, Durst's family members sought and received restraining orders against him, stating they were afraid of him. Durst was charged with trespassing in New York City for walking in front of townhouses owned by Douglas and other family members. He went on trial and was acquitted in December 2014. The judge also vacated the thirteen orders of protection his family members had taken out on him.

In July 2014, Durst was arrested after turning himself in to police following an incident at a Houston CVS Pharmacy in which he allegedly exposed his genitalia without provocation and urinated on a rack of candy. He then left the store and casually walked down the street. Durst was charged with misdemeanor criminal mischief. In December 2014, he pleaded "no contest" and was fined $500. His lawyer described the incident as an "unfortunate medical mishap." A recording of the incident was released on videotape in 2015.

== Death ==
Durst died of cardiac arrest at the San Joaquin General Hospital in French Camp, California, on January 10, 2022, at age 78. He had been undergoing medical tests when he went into cardiac arrest and did not respond to resuscitation. At the time of his death, Durst remained in the custody of the California Department of Corrections and Rehabilitation.

In January 2022, McCormack's family filed a wrongful death suit against Durst's estate. This was the fourth similar civil suit the family had filed since 2015, attempting to claim all or part of Durst's assets. In response, a federal judge in the Southern District of New York froze the estate of his second wife and heir, Debrah Charatan, (worth $100 million). The court documents say Charatan and/or her attorney must appear in court on March 25, 2022, and show cause why the order should not be issued. In March 2023, a federal court judge ruled the case of wrongful death filed by McCormack's family against Durst's estate could proceed. In the ruling, the judge wrote that the lawsuit filed was not untimely because of Durst's death. A conference was scheduled for April 2023. As of August 2025, the suit remains in the pre-trial phase, with active motion practice and hearings taking place. No trial date has been set.

On May 5, 2026, a federal court judge dismissed the wrongful death lawsuit filed by Kathie Durst’s family against Durst's widow, Debrah Lee Charatan. This means Charatan will legally inherit Durst's entire estate, the current value of which is unknown.

== In popular culture ==
- Three episodes in the Law & Order television franchise gave different takes on the murders: The Law & Order episode "Hands Free"; the Law & Order: Criminal Intent episode "Maledictus"; and the Law & Order: Special Victims Unit episode "Devil's Dissections".
- Fred Armisen played Durst in a 2003 sketch on Saturday Night Live and again in 2016 on Unbreakable Kimmy Schmidt. Kate McKinnon played Durst in a 2015 SNL sketch.
- The American Court TV television series Mugshots released an episode covering Durst, titled Robert Durst—Mogul in Murder Mystery.
- A&E and Lifetime announced in August 2016 that they were developing a movie based on the book A Deadly Secret. The television movie, titled The Lost Wife of Robert Durst, originally aired on November 11, 2017.
- Investigation Discovery network released a special miniseries titled Robert Durst: An ID Murder Mystery, containing new interviews with friends and family of Durst's alleged victims, along with his defense attorney Dick DeGuerin. Legal experts and crime reporters offer insights on evidence leading to Durst's arrest and originally scheduled for 2019 but delayed until 2021 murder trial. The series originally aired on January 21 and 22, 2019.
- The Jury Speaks dedicated an episode to his trial in Galveston, Texas.
- The progressive metal band Intronaut wrote the song "Fast Worms" for their 2015 album The Direction of Last Things about Durst and his crimes.
- ABC aired a two-hour episode of their TV newsmagazine 20/20 on March 18, 2022, about Durst and his bizarre life titled "The Devil You Know". It includes interviews and comments from friends, relatives, reporters, journalists, law enforcement, lawyers, prosecutors, all involved with Durst and his legal issues.
- The movie All Good Things (2010) stars Ryan Gosling as David Marks, a character inspired by Durst.
- In 2024, Oxygen True Crime network presented "Robert Durst: The Lost Years", an examination into Durst's whereabouts and activities between his various crimes and trials.

== See also ==
- List of people who disappeared mysteriously: 1910–1990
