= Dick DeGuerin =

American lawyer (born 1941)

- Born: Richard McDowell DeGeurin; February 16, 1941 (age 85); Austin, Texas, U.S.
- Education: University of Texas, Austin (BA, JD)
- Occupations: Lawyer, educator

Dick DeGuerin (born February 16, 1941, in Austin, Texas) is an American criminal defense attorney based in Houston. He has had a number of high-profile cases, including defending Celeste Beard, Tom DeLay, Robert Durst, David Koresh, and Allen Stanford.

== Education ==
The elder child of Marguerite and E. M. "Mack" DeGeurin, Richard McDowell DeGeurin changed the spelling of his surname at some point. He earned a Juris Doctor degree in 1965 from the University of Texas at Austin and that same year, he was admitted to the State Bar.

== Career ==
Early in his career (1971–1982), he was an associate with Percy Foreman. In 2005, he defended former House Majority Leader Tom DeLay in DeLay's defense against indictments for money laundering and conspiracy, brought by Texas prosecutor Ronnie Earle.

DeGuerin, a Democrat, previously prevailed over Earle in a case involving misconduct charges against U.S. Senator Kay Bailey Hutchison. DeLay was found guilty, but the conviction was overturned on appeal. He also represented bankers involved in fraud cases tied to the Enron collapse.

He represented David Koresh, the Branch Davidian cult leader, during Koresh's standoff with the FBI and the ATF agents near Waco, Texas. DeGuerin used a self-defense argument, and won, when he represented New York real estate heir Robert Durst, who admitted to killing and then dismembering the body of Durst's 71-year-old neighbor Morris Black, bagging the body parts and tossing them into Galveston Bay. DeGuerin once again represented Durst at his arraignment in New Orleans on March 16, 2015, for the murder of Susan Berman in 2000 (which arose out of the HBO miniseries special The Jinx: The Life and Deaths of Robert Durst).

Other cases include participating in the Congressional impeachment hearing of U.S. District Court Judge Samuel B. Kent. Among his clients were Celeste Beard (who was convicted of killing her husband and given a life sentence), Senator Kay Bailey Hutchison, David Mark Temple (convicted of killing his wife, who was 8 months pregnant) and Billy Joe Shaver.

In early June 2023, the Texas House committee investigating Texas attorney general Ken Paxton announced the hiring of DeGuerin and fellow high-profile attorney Rusty Hardin as impeachment prosecutors.

DeGuerin is an adjunct professor at the University of Texas School of Law, teaching criminal law.

== Personal life ==
DeGuerin's younger brother was attorney Mike DeGeurin (1945–2024); the two men spelled their surnames differently. In 2008, Dick DeGuerin was married to his third wife.

== Awards ==
In 1994, DeGuerin was named Outstanding Criminal Defense Lawyer of the Year by the State Bar of Texas Criminal Justice Section.
