= The Jinx (TV series) =

2015 documentary TV series

- Promotional poster for the first season, titled The Jinx: The Life and Deaths of Robert Durst.
- Also known as: The Jinx: The Life and Deaths of Robert Durst (season 1); The Jinx: Part Two (season 2)
- Genre: Documentary; True crime
- Created by: Andrew Jarecki; Marc Smerling; Zac Stuart-Pontier
- Written by: Andrew Jarecki; Marc Smerling (season 1); Zac Stuart-Pontier; Sam Neave (season 2)
- Directed by: Andrew Jarecki
- Opening theme: "Fresh Blood" by Eels (season 1); "Survivor" by Nathaniel Rateliff & The Night Sweats (season 2)
- Composers: West Dylan Thordson; John Kusiak; Mondo Boys (season 2)
- Country of origin: United States
- Original language: English
- No. of seasons: 2
- No. of episodes: 12

Production
- Executive producers: Jason Blum (season 1); Zac Stuart-Pontier; Andrew Jarecki; Nancy Abraham; Lisa Heller; Sara Rodriguez; Kyle Martin (season 2)
- Producers: Marc Smerling; Andrew Jarecki; Charlotte Kaufman (season 2); Sam Neave (season 2)
- Cinematography: Marc Smerling; David Paul Jacobson
- Editors: Zac Stuart-Pontier; Sam Neave; Lance Edmands; David Tillman
- Running time: 38–57 minutes
- Production companies: HBO Documentary Films; Blumhouse Television (season 1); Hit the Ground Running

Original release
- Network: HBO
- Release: February 8, 2015 – May 26, 2024

The Jinx is an American true crime documentary television series about New York real estate heir Robert Durst, a convicted murderer. The first season, subtitled The Life and Deaths of Robert Durst, debuted on HBO on February 8, 2015, and it consists of six episodes.

The series was directed by Andrew Jarecki, who had previously directed the feature fictional film All Good Things (2010), which was inspired by Durst's biography. Durst had professed admiration for the film and telephoned Jarecki after its release, offering to be interviewed (this conversation was recorded and incorporated into the documentary). Durst sat with Jarecki for more than 20 hours, over several years, despite having never previously cooperated with any journalist.

The Jinx gained widespread exposure when Durst was arrested on first-degree murder charges for the death of his friend Susan Berman the day before The Life and Deaths of Robert Durst finale aired.

In November 2023, HBO announced that The Jinx: Part Two, a six-episode continuation of the series, was in production with the same producers and director. It premiered on April 21, 2024. Part Two covers the eight years since 2015, including Durst's trial, new interviews, and prison calls.

== Synopsis ==
=== Season 1 ===
The series investigates the unsolved 1982 disappearance of Durst's wife, Kathie, the 2000 execution-style killing of writer Susan Berman, and the 2001 death and dismemberment of Durst's neighbor, Morris Black, in Galveston, Texas. Durst was suspected of involvement in the first two murders and confessed to the third but claimed self-defense and was acquitted at trial. The series incorporates a wide array of existing media, including news footage, security footage, police evidence, and archival interviews, combined with footage shot by Jarecki. It is composed of contemporary interviews, visual reenactments (some shot at Jarecki's upstate New York home), and self-reflexive footage of Jarecki's filmmaking process and odd working relationship with Durst. Its complex editing style and narrative construction emphasize the contradictions within both Durst's life and the bizarre and grisly murders he committed.

During the conclusion of the fifth episode, Sareb Kaufman, Berman's stepson, contacts the filmmakers, asking them to review material that Berman left after her murder. In it, he highlights an envelope Durst sent Berman, in March 1999: the envelope's block letter handwriting matches and contains the same "Beverley [sic] Hills" misspelling as an anonymous envelope sent to police in December 2000 to alert them to Berman's murder. The filmmakers, shocked by the revelation, place both envelopes in a safety deposit box and decide to get a second interview from Durst.

In the sixth and final episode, the filmmakers visit a forensic document examiner. After analyzing both envelopes and other documents in Durst's block letter writing, he says the two writings have characteristics that can come from "one person, and only one person". Jarecki attempts to get a second interview with Durst, who suddenly becomes evasive and uninterested in a follow-up. At one point, he claims to be in Spain, but Kaufman says that Durst told him he was in Los Angeles. After Durst is arrested for violating a restraining order filed by his brother, Douglas, Jarecki convinces Durst to give a second interview. During it, Jarecki confronts Durst about the match in handwriting on the two envelopes. Durst acknowledges the similarity but denies writing the letter about Berman's murder. After the interview, Durst goes to the bathroom. Apparently unaware that his microphone is still recording, he rambles at length, ending with, "What the hell did I do? Killed them all, of course."

=== Season 2 ===
The second season focuses on Durst's arrest and trial for Berman's murder. It includes the role of Chinga Chavin as a witness.

== Episodes ==
Season	Subtitle	Episodes	Originally released	
Season	Subtitle	Episodes	First released	Last released
1	The Life and Deaths of Robert Durst	6	February 8, 2015	March 15, 2015
2	Part Two	6	April 21, 2024	May 26, 2024

=== Season 1 (2015): The Life and Deaths of Robert Durst ===
No. overall	No. in season	Title	Directed by	Written by	Original release date	U.S. viewers (millions)
1	1	"A Body in the Bay"	Andrew Jarecki	Andrew Jarecki, Marc Smerling and Zac Stuart-Pontier	February 8, 2015	0.752
2	2	"Poor Little Rich Boy"	Andrew Jarecki	Andrew Jarecki, Marc Smerling and Zac Stuart-Pontier	February 15, 2015	0.321
3	3	"The Gangster's Daughter"	Andrew Jarecki	Andrew Jarecki, Marc Smerling and Zac Stuart-Pontier	February 22, 2015	0.381
4	4	"The State of Texas vs. Robert Durst"	Andrew Jarecki	Andrew Jarecki, Marc Smerling and Zac Stuart-Pontier	March 1, 2015	0.388
5	5	"Family Values"	Andrew Jarecki	Andrew Jarecki, Marc Smerling and Zac Stuart-Pontier	March 8, 2015	0.446
6	6	"What the Hell Did I Do?" (Note: Chapter 6 is referred to as "The Second Interview" on some promotional platforms.)	Andrew Jarecki	Andrew Jarecki, Marc Smerling and Zac Stuart-Pontier	March 15, 2015	0.802

=== Season 2 (2024): Part Two ===
No. overall	No. in season	Title	Directed by	Written by	Original release date
7	1	"Why Are You Still Here?"	Andrew Jarecki	Andrew Jarecki, Sam Neave and Zac Stuart-Pontier	April 21, 2024
8	2	"Friendships Die Hard"	Andrew Jarecki	Andrew Jarecki, Sam Neave and Zac Stuart-Pontier	April 28, 2024
9	3	"Saving My Tears Until It's Official"	Andrew Jarecki	Andrew Jarecki, Sam Neave and Zac Stuart-Pontier	May 5, 2024
10	4	"The Unluckiest Man in the World"	Andrew Jarecki	Andrew Jarecki, Sam Neave and Zac Stuart-Pontier	May 12, 2024
11	5	"Mostly the Truth"	Andrew Jarecki	Andrew Jarecki, Sam Neave and Zac Stuart-Pontier	May 19, 2024
12	6	"It Takes a Village"	Andrew Jarecki	Andrew Jarecki, Sam Neave and Zac Stuart-Pontier	May 26, 2024

== Cast ==
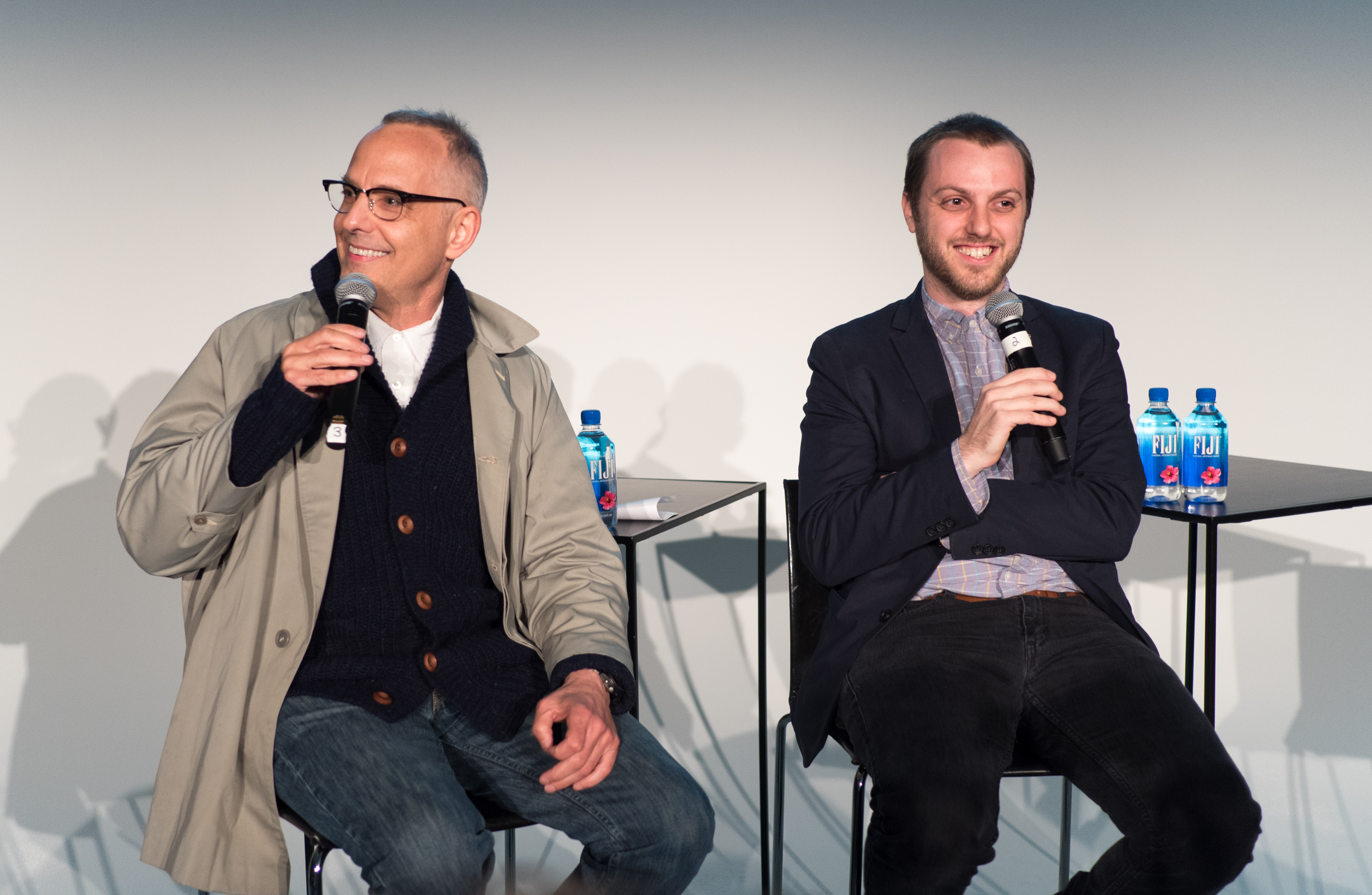
Writers Marc Smerling and Zac Stuart-Pontier in 2018

In order of appearance:

- Gary Jones (detective, Galveston Police Department)
- Joel Bennett (Assistant District Attorney, Galveston)
- Cody Cazalas (detective, Galveston Police Department)
- Randy Burrows (member of Galveston Dive Team)
- Debrah Lee Charatan (current wife of Robert Durst)
- Charles V. Bagli (reporter, The New York Times)
- Jeanine Pirro (former District Attorney, Westchester County, New York)
- Douglas Durst (younger brother of Robert Durst; chairman, Durst Organization)
- Robert Durst
- John Waldron (attorney for Robert Durst)
- Michael Kennedy (Durst family attorney)
- Dick DeGuerin (attorney for Robert Durst)
- Andrew Jarecki (director and producer, All Good Things)
- Marc Smerling (writer and producer, All Good Things)
- Eamonn Bowles (Magnolia Pictures, distributor, All Good Things)
- Ann McCormack (mother of Kathie Durst)
- Jim McCormack (brother of Kathie Durst)
- Gilberte Najamy (friend of Kathie Durst)
- Geraldine McInerney (McCormack family friend)
- Eleanor Schwank (friend of Kathie Durst)
- Michael Struk (former detective, New York City Police Department)
- Ellen Strauss (friend of Kathie Durst)
- Bill Mayer (neighbor of Robert Durst)
- Joe Becerra (detective, New York State Police)
- Gabrielle Colquitt (later owner of Durst lake house)
- Ed Murphy (senior investigator, Westchester District Attorney's Office)
- Susan Berman (friend of Robert Durst)
- Tom Padden Sr., Tom Padden Jr. (cousins of Susan Berman)
- Kim Lankford (friend of Susan Berman)
- Lynda Obst (friend of Susan Berman)
- Julie Smith (friend of Susan Berman)
- Kevin Hynes (former Assistant District Attorney, Westchester County, New York)
- Sareb and Mella Kaufman (children of Susan Berman's boyfriend)
- Deni Marcus (cousin of Susan Berman)
- Paul Coulter (detective, Los Angeles Police Department)
- Stephen Silverman (friend of Susan Berman)
- Kurt Sistrunk (former District Attorney, Galveston County, Texas)
- Michael Ramsey (attorney for Robert Durst)
- Susan Criss (judge, Galveston County, Texas)
- Chris Lovell, Joanne Gongora (jurors, Texas v. Durst)
- Chip Lewis (attorney for Robert Durst)
- Evan Kreeger (nephew of Robert Durst)
- Edward Wright (former private investigator)
- Elizabeth McCormack (niece of Kathie Durst)
- Ross Vitalie (cab driver, Eureka, California)
- John Osborn (forensic document examiner)

=== Cast (reenactment) ===
- Gary Napoli as Robert Durst
- Eric Rizk as Seymour Durst
  - Michael Antonio as Young Robert Durst
- Deirdre Roberts as Kathie Durst
- Candace Bryant as Ellen Strauss
- Juliette Campa as Susan Berman
- Sara Canter as Geraldine
- Rose Cordova as Eleanor Schwank
- Gus Lynch as Beverly Hills Postal Worker
- Dillon Mathews as Struk
- Amelie McKendry as Mary McCormack
- Hanan Miller as Douglas Durst
- John Ohkuma as Jim McCormack

== Aftermath ==
Douglas Durst, estranged brother of Robert and head of the Durst Organization, was apprehensive about the documentary's portrayal of the Durst family and, in particular, its use of videotaped depositions that had been subject to a confidentiality agreement. He petitioned the New York Supreme Court in January 2015 to compel Jarecki to reveal his sources. "Douglas Durst is worried [that] The Jinx will be a violent broadside against the family name and history", the petition stated. By showing that Robert or his wife, Debrah Lee Charatan, violated a Westchester County judge's 2006 order sealing the material, Douglas could sue to recover a $65 million family trust settlement. According to The New York Times, Robert gave filmmakers "unrestricted access" to his personal files, including the videotaped testimony.

A lawyer for Douglas argued that The Jinx is a "sensationalized docudrama" and that its director is exempt from New York's shield law, designed to protect journalists. Jarecki replied that his use of dramatic reenactments (by actors whose faces were never shown) was not evidence of fictionalization. Despite attempting to "portray Robert Durst as a human being in a fashion that could help explain some of his behavior, rather than as a burlesque figure," Jarecki never promised Durst that his film would defend his innocence.

On March 14, 2015, the eve of the final episode's airing, the FBI arrested Durst in New Orleans on a first-degree murder warrant the LAPD obtained in connection to Berman's death. They had undertaken an investigation based on new evidence presented in the miniseries. The Associated Press reported that the 1999 letter Durst wrote to Berman, unearthed by the filmmakers, provided "key new evidence" leading to the murder charges. According to The New York Times, the filmmakers sought legal advice on when to share the letter with law enforcement, weighing journalistic privilege against possible claims of evidentiary inadmissibility in a future trial.

Interviewed ten days after his brother's arrest, Douglas told The New York Times that his brother had stalked him as recently as February 22, 2015, in Palm Beach, Florida. He felt "a tremendous sense of relief" at the turn of events that led to Robert's arrest. Although sharply disputing some assumptions about the Durst family presented in Jarecki's documentary (which he had not seen), and continuing to stress the threat Robert posed to him and others, Douglas sounded a conciliatory note: "I no longer am looking over my shoulder", he said. "I'm very grateful to 'The Jinx' for having brought this about." Douglas dropped his legal action against Jarecki in late April 2015, and was reportedly considering a move to freeze $74 million of his estranged brother's assets.

In April 2019, during Durst's trial, a transcript from the series revealed that Durst's final remarks had been edited and presented out of order. According to the transcript filed in court, Durst's complete remarks were as follows:

"[Unintelligible] I don't know what you expected to get. I don't know what's in the house. Oh, I want this. Killed them all, of course. [Unintelligible] I want to do something new. There's nothing new about that. [Inaudible - possibly "disaster."] He was right. I was wrong. The burping. I'm having difficulty with the question. What the hell did I do?" (Note: Emphasis provided on the two lines edited out of order.)

Jarecki, Smerling, and Stuart-Pontier defended the edits as "entirely representative of what Durst said". Documentary filmmaker Mark Jonathan Harris called the edits "problematic", saying that Durst's statements are "definitely more ambiguous in the transcript" and the edit made them "damning".

== Soundtrack ==
The theme song for the first season is "Fresh Blood" performed by Eels while the second season's theme is "Survivor" by Nathaniel Rateliff & The Night Sweats. The original score was composed by West Dylan Thordson with co-composition by John Kusiak. A musical saw, performed by Natalia Paruz, is featured throughout the series.

== Reception ==
The Jinx received widespread critical acclaim and media buzz, particularly upon airing its revelatory finale. On Rotten Tomatoes, the first season has an approval rating of 96% based on 45 reviews. The website's critics consensus is, "Disturbing themes and an engrossing blend of interviews and dramatizations make The Jinx: The Life and Deaths of Robert Durst a docu-series that merits further pursuit." On Metacritic, the first season has a weighted average score of 76 out of 100, based on 21 critics, indicating "generally favorable reviews".

John Hendrickson at Esquire called the series' ending "one of the most jaw-dropping moments in television history." Mike Hale from The New York Times said it was "gut-wrenching, remarkable television." Sean T. Collins of The New York Observer called the series "a documentarian's unicorn: a quest for the truth that, it seems, found it, and found it spectacularly," adding that in comparison to usual television true-crime documentary fare, The Jinx "pulls an SUV with a vanity plate that reads 'BEVERLEY' up on the curb and mows it all down."

Other critics accused the documentary of charting an uncomfortable line between storytelling and journalism. Two days after Durst's arrest and one day after the final installment of The Jinx was aired, The New Yorker reported that "[t]he filmmakers, having been quizzed on the time line of events as represented, have cancelled forthcoming interviews." Specifically, when challenged over whether Robert Durst's arrest for trespassing on his brother Douglas Durst's property occurred before the filmmakers' second interview with Robert, as implied by The Jinx, Andrew Jarecki replied, "Yeah, I think I've got to get back to you with a proper response on that." Several media outlets questioned how long the filmmakers had sat on evidence damaging to Durst before turning it over to law enforcement.

Jarecki subsequently sent an explanation to multiple media outlets:

"Given that we are likely to be called as witnesses in any case law enforcement may decide to bring against Robert Durst, it is not appropriate for us to comment further on these pending matters. We can confirm that evidence (including the envelope and the washroom recording) was turned over to authorities months ago."

A study of Westchester County case notes by The Guardian indicated that, contrary to then-District Attorney Jeanine Pirro's assertions in The Jinx that "we were about to speak with" Susan Berman about Kathie Durst's disappearance, New York investigators had not yet scheduled an interview nor funded an investigator to visit Berman in California at the time of her December 23, 2000, murder. Durst said in a 2005 deposition, excerpted in The Jinx, that Berman called him shortly before her death and said: "The Los Angeles police contacted me. They wanted to talk about Kathie Durst's disappearance."

Although the Los Angeles Police Department denied any connection between Durst's arrest and HBO's airing of The Jinx finale, Dick DeGuerin, Durst's defense attorney, lashed out at the timing. "Do I think this is a coincidence? Hell, no," he said. "There has been rumor, innuendo and speculation for a number of years, and now we're going to get our day in court on this."

On Rotten Tomatoes, the second season holds an approval rating of 85% with an average rating of 7.3/10, based on 34 reviews. The website's critics consensus is, "Becoming more metatextual after the shocking revelations of its first season, Andrew Jarecki's riveting docuseries evades the sophomore jinx by exploring the insidious entourage that enabled Robert Durst's crimes." On Metacritic, the season holds a weighted average score of 70 out of 100, based on 23 critics, indicating "generally favorable reviews".

== Awards ==
The Jinx was nominated for six and won two Primetime Creative Arts Emmy Awards in 2015: Outstanding Documentary or Nonfiction Series and Outstanding Picture Editing for Nonfiction Programming. It received nominations for Outstanding Cinematography for Nonfiction Programming, Outstanding Directing for Nonfiction Programming, Outstanding Sound Editing for Nonfiction Programming (Single or Multi-Camera), and Outstanding Sound Mixing for Nonfiction Programming.

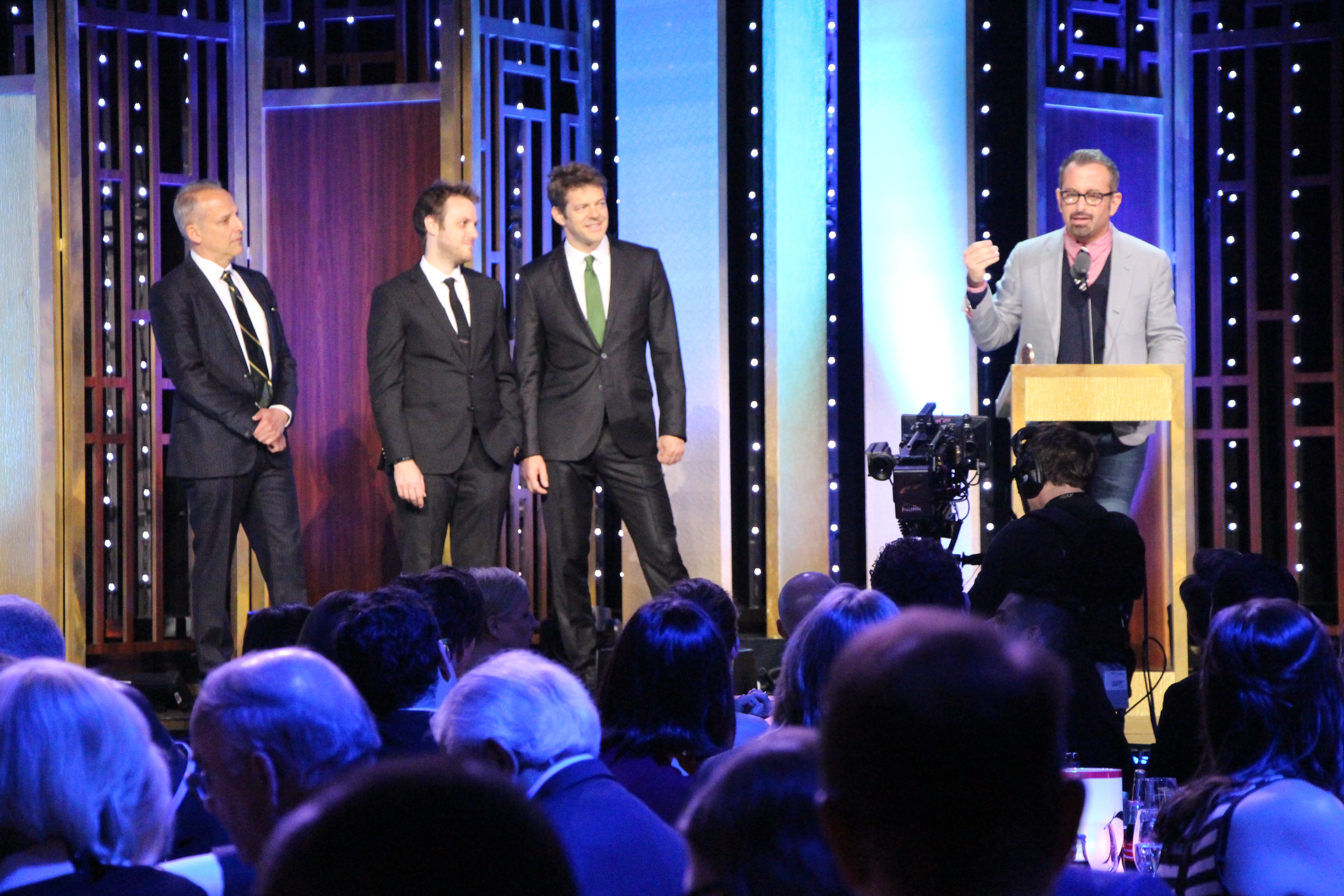
The producers of The Jinx accept a 2015 Peabody Award for their work.

The Jinx was also awarded a 2015 Peabody Award, as well as the TCA Award for Outstanding Achievement in Movies, Miniseries and Specials from the Television Critics Association. Marc Smerling, Andrew Jarecki, and Jason Blum won the Producers Guild of America Award for Outstanding Producer of Non-Fiction Television.

== International broadcast ==
The miniseries premiered in Australia on May 7, 2015, on Showcase. The Jinx premiered in India on June 9, 2015, on HBO Defined.
