= Andrew Jarecki =

American filmmaker & entrepreneur

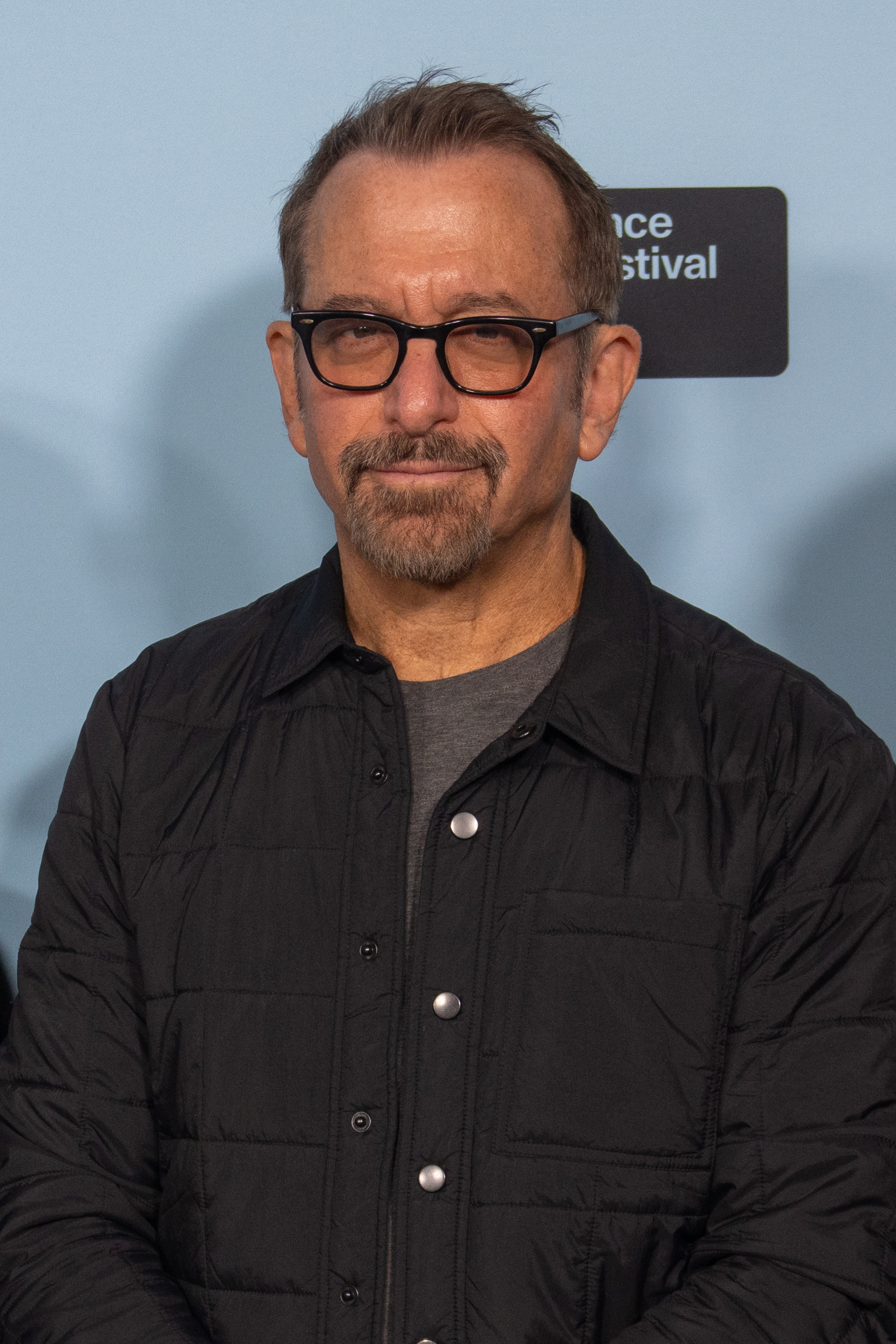
- Jarecki at the 2025 Sundance Film Festival
- Born: March 24, 1963 (age 63); United States
- Occupation: Film director
- Relatives: Henry Jarecki (father); Eugene Jarecki (brother); Nicholas Jarecki (half-brother)

Andrew Jarecki (born March 24, 1963) is an American filmmaker, musician, and entrepreneur. He is best known for the Emmy-winning documentary series The Jinx. He is also known for the documentary films Capturing the Friedmans (2003) and The Alabama Solution (2025), both winners and nominees at several festivals and awards ceremonies, earning both of them an Academy Award for Best Documentary Feature Film nomination.

== Career ==
Jarecki graduated from Princeton University in 1985. He is the co-founder and CEO of Moviefone, which provides film schedules over the Internet and telephone and was sold to AOL in 1999. With producer J. J. Abrams, Jarecki co-wrote the theme song to Felicity, "New Version of You", in 2000.

Jarecki's 2003 documentary about a family, Capturing the Friedmans, his first feature, began as an offshoot from a short film he was making about birthday party clowns, which was titled Just a Clown and released in 2004. It earned him his first Academy Awards nomination for Best Documentary and recognition by the National Board of Review Award for Best Documentary Film.

Jarecki went on to direct the narrative feature All Good Things starring Ryan Gosling, Kirsten Dunst, and Frank Langella. The film, inspired by the life of millionaire Robert Durst and the unsolved disappearance of his wife Kathie, was released in 2010.

Along with filmmaking partner Marc Smerling, Jarecki also produced the 2010 documentary film Catfish, and co-produced and directed the documentary series The Jinx, which aired on HBO in 2015. Jarecki plays the drums and sings backing vocals on Bikini Robot Army's single "Joe Strummer's House".

Jarecki directed the 2018 Netflix comedy series Bumping Mics with Jeff Ross & Dave Attell.

In 2025 he produced, directed and write the documentary The Alabama Solution about the prison system in Alabama, being praised by critics and being nominated at the Academy Award for Best Documentary Feature Film.

== Personal life ==
Jarecki is the son of financier-philanthropist Henry Jarecki. He is also the brother of documentary filmmaker Eugene Jarecki and finance executive Thomas A. Jarecki, and the half-brother of filmmaker Nicholas Jarecki.

Jarecki lives in New York City with his wife, Nancy Jarecki, and their three children.

== Filmography ==
Year	Film or TV series	Credited as				Note
Year	Film or TV series	Director	Producer	Writer	Composer	Note
2000	Felicity				Yes	TV series - theme music composer
2003	Capturing the Friedmans	Yes	Yes			Documentary feature
2004	Just a Clown	Yes				Documentary short
2010	All Good Things	Yes	Yes			Narrative feature
2010	Catfish		Yes			Documentary feature
2013	Catfish: The TV Show		Yes			Executive producer, episode: "Derek & Kristen"
2015–24	The Jinx	Yes	Yes	Yes		HBO documentary miniseries
2018	Bumping Mics with Jeff Ross & Dave Attell	Yes				Netflix three-part series
2025	The Alabama Solution	Yes	Yes	Yes		Documentary feature

== Accolades ==
=== Academy Awards ===
Year	Category	Work	Result	Ref.
2004	Best Documentary Feature Film	Capturing the Friedmans	Nominated	
2026	Best Documentary Feature Film	The Alabama Solution	Nominated	

=== Emmy Awards ===
Year	Category	Work	Result	Ref.
Primetime Emmy Awards
2015	Outstanding Documentary or Nonfiction Series	The Jinx: The Life and Deaths of Robert Durst	Won	
2015	Outstanding Directing for a Documentary/Nonfiction Program	The Jinx: The Life and Deaths of Robert Durst	Nominated	
2024	Outstanding Documentary or Nonfiction Series	The Jinx: Part Two	Nominated	
2024	Outstanding Writing for a Nonfiction Programming	The Jinx: Part Two	Nominated	

=== Other awards and nominations ===
Award	Year	Category	Work(s)	Result	Ref.
Critics' Choice Documentary Awards	2025	Best Director	The Alabama Solution	Nominated	
Directors Guild of America Awards	2003	Outstanding Directing for a Documentary	Capturing the Freidmans	Nominated	
International Documentary Association	2025	Best Production	The Alabama Solution	Nominated	
Los Angeles Film Critics Association	2003	Best Documentary Film	Capturing the Freidmans	Nominated	
National Board of Review	2003	Top Five Documentaries	Capturing the Freidmans	Won	
National Board of Review	2003	Freedom of Expression Award	Himself	Won	
New York Film Critics Circle Awards	2003	Best Non-Fiction Film	Capturing the Freidmans	Won	
Producers Guild of America Award	2016	Outstanding Producer of Non-Fiction Television	The Jinx: The Life and Deaths of Robert Durst	Won	
Producers Guild of America Award	2026	Best Documentary	The Alabama Solution	Pending	
Satellite Awards	2026	Best Documentary Film	The Alabama Solution	Pending	
Seattle Film Critics Society	2025	Best Documentary Feature	The Alabama Solution	Nominated	
Sundance Film Festival	2003	Grand Jury Prize	Capturing the Friedmans	Won	
TCA Awards	2015	Outstanding Achievement in Movies, Miniseries and Specials	The Jinx	Won	
