= Federal Correctional Institution, Cumberland =

Federal prison in Maryland, United States

Coordinates: 39°35′44″N 78°45′45″W

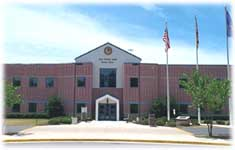
- Interactive map of Federal Correctional Institution, Cumberland
- Location: Allegany County, near Cumberland, Maryland
- Status: Operational
- Security class: Medium-security (with minimum-security prison camp)
- Population: 1,179 (304 in prison camp)
- Opened: 1994
- Managed by: Federal Bureau of Prisons

The Federal Correctional Institution, Cumberland (FCI Cumberland) is a medium-security United States federal prison for male inmates in Maryland. It is operated by the Federal Bureau of Prisons, a division of the United States Department of Justice. The facility also has a satellite prison camp for minimum-security male offenders.

FCI Cumberland is located in unincorporated Allegany County, western Maryland, 130 miles (210 km) northwest of Washington, D.C.

FCI Cumberland also has a license plate manufacturing center, where inmates produce license plates used on federal government vehicles.

== Notable inmates ==
=== Current ===
Inmate Name	Register Number	Photo	Status	Details
Matthew F. Hale	15177-424		Serving a 40-year sentence; scheduled for release in 2036. Previously at ADX Florence.	
Jeffrey MacDonald	00131-177		Serving a life sentence.	Former US Army doctor; convicted in 1979 of the 1970 murders of his wife and two children in their home at Fort Bragg Army Base in North Carolina; the case was the subject of author Joe McGinniss's book and NBC's miniseries Fatal Vision.
Ed Brown	03923-049		Serving a 37-year sentence; scheduled for release in 2034. Currently at FCI Gilmer.	Sovereign citizen movement member; convicted in 2009 of conspiracy for stockpiling bombs and firearms during an 8-month standoff with authorities attempting to apprehend him and his wife, Elaine Brown, for a 2007 tax evasion conviction.
Javaid Perwaiz	26867–083		Serving a 59-year sentence; scheduled for release in 2069.	Former OBGYN in Virginia who performed unnecessary surgeries, including hysterectomies and sterilizations, on women.
Clayton Waagner	17258–039		Scheduled for release in 2042.	Convicted bank robber and anti-abortion terrorist who was on one of the FBI Ten Most Wanted Fugitives and United States Marshals Service Top 15 Fugitives list.
Bobby Paul Edwards	32836–171		Serving a 10-year sentence; scheduled for release on November 6, 2026. Currently at FCI Jesup.	Restaurant owner who forced mentally disabled employee to work at his restaurant. The case was high-profile over allegations that the crime was racially motivated (Edwards is white and the victim was black).
Abduwali Muse	70636-054		Sentenced to 33 years and 9 months imprisonment, to be released June 20, 2038.	Convicted of hijacking, kidnapping and hosting-taking in connection to the Maersk Alabama hijacking in 2009.
Takeshi Ebisawa	94582-509		Sentenced to 20 years imprisonment, to be released April 19, 2039.	
Ryan Salame	76655–510		Serving an 7.5-year sentence.	Convicted of conspiring to make unlawful political contributions, defrauding the Federal Election Commission and conspiring to operate an unlicensed money transmitting business, and was sentenced on May 28, 2024.
Marc Laruelle	73028-509		Serving a 4-year sentence	Yonkers, NY psychiatrist and former Yale and Columbia University Professor and renowned schizophrenia researcher, who pled guilty to distributing 100,000 doses of a highly potent and addictive opioid without a legitimate medical purpose while acting outside the usual course of professional practice. Laruelle charged patients as much as $800 per prescription, with the understanding that the drugs would be resold on the black market.

=== Former ===
Inmate Name	Register Number	Photo	Status	Details
Joseph Watts	42320–053		Released from custody on January 14, 2022; served 11 years.	High ranking associate of the Gambino crime family. Was found guilty in 2011 for his part in a 1989 murder conspiracy on orders of John Gotti.
Bernard Kerik	84888-054		Released from custody in 2013; served 3 years.	Former NYPD Commissioner and Homeland Security Secretary nominee under President George W. Bush; pleaded guilty in 2009 to tax evasion for accepting services from a company in return for his assistance in obtaining a city construction permit.
Jack Abramoff	27593-112		Released from custody in 2010; served 42 months.	Former Washington, D.C.-based lobbyist at the center of the largest lobbying scandal in American political history; pleaded guilty in 2006 to fraud, tax evasion, and conspiracy to bribe public officials.
Cameron Douglas	70707-054		Released on August 1, 2016; served 7 years.	On July 28, 2009, Douglas was arrested by the Drug Enforcement Administration for possession of 0.5 pounds (0.23 kg) of methamphetamine. Due to the large amount of the drug seized, Douglas was charged with intent to distribute. The charge carries a minimum prison sentence of 10 years and a maximum of life.
Gordon Ernst	64601–037		Serving a 30-month sentence; scheduled for release in 2024.	Former Georgetown University men and women's tennis coach, pled guilty to conspiracy to commit federal programs bribery, three counts of federal programs bribery and filing false tax returns for failing to report many of the bribery payments as part of the Varsity Blues scandal.
Stewart Rhodes	81981–509		Released after sentence was commuted by President Donald J. Trump on January 20, 2025.	Convicted of Seditious Conspiracy, Obstructing an Official Proceeding, and other crimes surrounding the Protest at the United States Capitol on January 6, 2021 and sentenced to 18 years.
Solomon Dwek	27925-050		Released from custody in 2015; served 29 months.	Former real estate investor and key informant for Operation Bid Rig, one of the largest corruption stings in US history resulting in the convictions of dozens of public officials in New Jersey; arrested in 2006 for masterminding a $50 million bank fraud.
Webster Hubbell	20219-009		Released from custody in 1997; served two years.	A key figure in the Whitewater controversy; convicted of wire fraud and tax fraud for overbilling legal clients. See also: United States v. Hubbell, a 2000 Supreme Court case.
Masoud Khan	46810-083		Released in 2018	Leader of the Virginia jihad network; convicted in 2004 of seditious conspiracy and other charges for attending a terrorist training camp run by the terrorist group Lashkar-e-Taiba and purchasing weapons in preparation to undertake violent jihad; several co-conspirators were also sentenced to prison. Released in 2018 after judge Leonie Brinkema determined that the sentences of the men involved in the plot were "draconian" and vacated their sentences. As of 2020, all members of the network have been released from prison.
Aldrich Ames	40087-083		Died while serving a sentence of life without parole on January 5, 2026	American CIA counterintelligence officer; convicted of espionage on behalf of the Soviet Union and Russia in 1994; responsible for the arrest and eventual execution of numerous Soviet and Russian officials secretly working on behalf of the U.S. intelligence community

== See also ==
- List of U.S. federal prisons
- Federal Bureau of Prisons
- Incarceration in the United States
