= Joe McGinniss Jr. =

American novelist, born 1970

- Born: 1970 (age 55–56)
- Education: Swarthmore College (BA); American University (MPP)
- Occupations: Writer, author
- Relatives: Joe McGinniss (father)
- Writing career
- Genre: Novels
- Notable works: The Delivery Man; Carousel Court
- Website: www.joemcginnissjr.com

Joe McGinniss Jr. (born 1970) is an American writer. He is the author of The Delivery Man and Carousel Court.

== Biography ==
McGinniss graduated from Swarthmore College and later American University, where he obtained a Masters in Public Policy. McGinniss worked for Mayor Willie Brown in San Francisco as a political consultant and community liaison focusing on development of programs for at-risk youths.

The Delivery Man was published January 15, 2008. His short fiction has appeared in Las Vegas Weekly, and the New Yorker.

Carousel Court was published on August 2, 2016. It was a finalist for the 2016 Kirkus Prize. McGinniss lives in Washington, D.C. He is the son of American writer Joe McGinniss.

== Works ==
- The Delivery Man: A Novel. Grove/Atlantic, Incorporated. 15 January 2008. ISBN 978-1-55584-826-2.
- Carousel Court: A Novel. Simon & Schuster. 2 August 2016. ISBN 978-1-4767-9130-2.
