= The Delivery Man =

(The) Delivery Man may refer to:

- Delivery man, someone engaged in commercial delivery service
- The Delivery Man (album), an album by Elvis Costello
- Delivery Man (film), a 2013 American film
- The Delivery Man (TV series), a British television sitcom
- The Delivery Man (novel), a novel by Joe McGinniss, Jr.
- MLB Delivery Man of the Year Award, a professional baseball award
- Delivery Man (TV series), a 2023 South Korean romantic comedy series
