= Going to Extremes =

Going to Extremes may refer to:

- Going to Extremes (British TV series), a documentary TV series
- Going to Extremes (American TV series), a drama TV series
- Going to Extremes (book), a 1980 book by Joe McGinniss
