= A Wilderness of Error (TV series) =

2020 FX docuseries

- Genre: Documentary; True crime
- Based on: A Wilderness of Error: The Trials of Jeffrey MacDonald by Errol Morris
- Written by: Andrew Jarecki; Marc Smerling; Zac Stuart-Pontier
- Directed by: Marc Smerling
- Starring: Clay Boulware; John Morgan; Logan Stearns; Roger Hervas; Bryan King; Gina Mazzara
- Composers: Kenny Kusiak; John Kusiak
- Country of origin: United States
- Original language: English
- No. of episodes: 5

Production
- Executive producers: Marc Smerling; Jason Blum; Michael Jackson; Rachael Horovitz
- Producers: Marc Smerling; Jason Blum; Scott Curtis
- Cinematography: Philipp Friesenbichler; Brian Jackson
- Production companies: Truth Media; Rachael Horovitz Prods.; Universal Content Productions; Blumhouse Television; FXP

Original release
- Network: FX
- Release: September 25 – October 2, 2020

A Wilderness of Error is an FX documentary true crime five-part series premiered on September 25, 2020, directed by Marc Smerling. It is based on the book A Wilderness of Error: The Trials of Jeffrey MacDonald by Errol Morris.

== Premise ==
The series examines the case of Jeffrey MacDonald, an Army surgeon who was accused of murdering his wife and two daughters on February 17, 1970. He was convicted of the crime on August 29, 1979, and has been in prison since 1982. However, MacDonald maintains his innocence.

== Cast ==
=== Main ===
- Chris Cartusciello as Freddy Kassab
- Clay Boulware as Joe McGinniss
- John Morgan as Jeffrey MacDonald
- Logan Stewarns as Jeffrey MacDonald
- Roger Hervas as Foreman
- Bryan King as Detective Prince Beasley
- Gina Mazzara as Helena Stoeckley

=== Recurring and guest ===
- Audrey Nita Bennett as Mildred Kassab
- Catherine Dawson as Helena Stoeckley
- Paul Spriggs as Jeffrey MacDonald
- James Trenton as Bernie Segal
- Kalyn Altmeyer Colette MacDonald
- Avery Ilardi as Kimberly MacDonald
- Clyde Drew as Bobby Jones
- Ryan Lee Dunlab as CID Agent Mike Pickering
- Vince Eisenson as CID Agent Peter Kearns
- Frank Failla as Detective Butch Madden
- Nick Dietz as Colonel Warren Rock
- Dan Lerner as CID Chief Franz Grebner
- Cliff LoBrutto as Dennis Meehan
- Rashid Helper as Vernoy Kennedy
- Mark Daly as William Berryhill
- And Palladino as Jimmy Friar
- Hugo Salazar Jr. as CID Agent Hagan Rossi
- Rick J. Koch as Judge Franklin Dupree
- Edwin Bacher as Eddie Sigmon
- Joy Bridenbaker as Kathryn MacDonald

== Episodes ==
No.	Title	Original release date	U.S. viewers (millions)
1	"Girl in a Floppy Hat"	September 25, 2020	0.284
2	"A Time of Suspicion"	September 25, 2020	0.162
3	"Should the Jury Find..."	September 25, 2020	0.162
4	"When a Narrative Becomes Reality"	October 2, 2020	0.260
5	"A Wilderness of Error"	October 2, 2020	0.193

== Production ==
In April 2020, Academy Award-nominated film producer Marc Smerling served as director for the series.

== Release ==
A Wilderness of Error premiered on FX on September 25, 2020. The first official trailer was released by FX on July 30, 2020. It was released internationally on Disney + as Star Original Series.
