= The Journalist and the Murderer =

1990 study by Janet Malcolm about the ethics of journalism

- Author: Janet Malcolm
- Language: English
- Publisher: Alfred A. Knopf, Random House
- Publication date: 1990

The Journalist and the Murderer is a study by Janet Malcolm about the ethics of journalism, published by Alfred A. Knopf/Random House in 1990. It is an examination of the professional choices that shape a work of non-fiction, as well as a rumination on the morality that underpins the journalistic enterprise. The journalist in question is Joe McGinniss; the murderer is the former Special Forces captain Dr. Jeffrey R. MacDonald, who became the subject of McGinniss's 1983 book Fatal Vision.

When Malcolm's work first appeared in March 1989, as a two-part serialization in The New Yorker, it caused a sensation, becoming the occasion for wide-ranging debate within the news industry. This heavy criticism continued when published in book form a year later. However, The Journalist and the Murderer is now regarded as a "seminal" work, and its "once controversial theory became received wisdom." It ranks 97th on the Modern Library's list of the 100 best non-fiction works of the 20th century."

== Themes ==
Malcolm's thesis, and the most widely quoted passage from The Journalist and the Murderer, is its opening paragraph: "Every journalist who is not too stupid or too full of himself to notice what is going on knows that what he does is morally indefensible." She continues:

He is a kind of confidence man, preying on people's vanity, ignorance or loneliness, gaining their trust and betraying them without remorse. Like the credulous widow who wakes up one day to find the charming young man and all her savings gone, so the consenting subject of a piece of nonfiction learns—when the article or book appears—his hard lesson. Journalists justify their treachery in various ways according to their temperaments. The more pompous talk about freedom of speech and "the public's right to know"; the least talented talk about Art, the seemliest murmur about earning a living.

== Content ==
Malcolm took as her subject the popular non-fiction writer Joe McGinniss; McGinniss had become a best-selling author with his 1969 work The Selling of the President 1968. After McGinniss interviewed the accused murderer Jeffrey MacDonald, MacDonald proposed that McGinniss write a book of his story and asked for a share of the revenue from the book as a way to fund his legal battle. McGinniss agreed. Having received a sizable advance payment for the true crime project that would become Fatal Vision, McGinniss struck up a close friendship with MacDonald. Later, to assuage the uneasiness of other members at the defense table, lead counsel Bernard Segal had McGinniss sign a contract under terms that McGinniss would not divulge defense strategy to outsiders and would put a positive spin on MacDonald's story.

MacDonald, an Army physician, had been charged with the 1970 murders of his 26-year-old pregnant wife Collette and their two young daughters. McGinniss secured MacDonald's cooperation in turning his story into a book: the journalist would report from both the court room and MacDonald's side. McGinniss shared housing with his book's subject, exercised with him, and sat beside him at the defense table during his trial. As Malcolm writes in her book, "They clothed their complicated business together in the mantle of friendship—in this case, friendship of a particularly American cast, whose emblems of intimacy are watching sports on television, drinking beer, running, and classifying women according to their looks." Within a month of MacDonald's conviction, McGinniss began a series of letters. Malcolm quotes McGinniss's expressions of sympathy—"any fool can recognize within five minutes that you did not receive a fair trial...it was utter madness"—as well as his tacit assurances that the book would help win his release: "it's a hell of a thing—spend the summer making a new friend and the bastards come and lock him up. But not for long, Jeffrey—not for long."

Malcolm states that in fact McGinniss had become swiftly and easily convinced of MacDonald's guilt during the trial. She also describes how, in the same months that he wrote warm letters to the now-jailed MacDonald, he was also writing to his editor Morgan Entrekin, discussing the technical problem of not spoiling his work's effect by making MacDonald, in the book, appear "too loathsome too soon." Throughout the years of interviews, as Malcolm writes, "MacDonald imagined he was 'helping' McGinniss write a book exonerating him of his crime." What she terms MacDonald's "dehoaxing" took place in "a particularly dramatic and cruel manner"—a 1983 taping of the CBS news program 60 Minutes. As host Mike Wallace read aloud portions of the now-completed Fatal Vision, the cameras broadcast MacDonald's look of "shock and utter discomposure."

== Pathological narcissists and auto-fictionalizers ==
In the published Fatal Vision, McGinniss depicted MacDonald as a "womanizer" and a "publicity-seeker", as well as a sociopath who, unbalanced by amphetamines, had murdered his family. But to Malcolm, MacDonald in person seemed sturdy and unremarkable. McGinniss drew upon the works of social critics, including the moralist Christopher Lasch, to construct a portrait of MacDonald as a "pathological narcissist."

But as presented by Malcolm, what drove McGinniss to this strategy were professional and structural liabilities—MacDonald's "lack of vividness," his drawbacks as the real-life figure who would serve as main character for his book. MacDonald, charismatic in person, lost vigor on the page. As other journalists noted, when interviewed MacDonald could "sound like an accountant."

"As every journalist will confirm," Malcolm writes,

MacDonald's uninterestingness is not unusual at all...When a journalist fetches up against someone like [him], all he can do is flee and hope that a more suitable subject will turn up soon. In the MacDonald-McGinniss case we have an instance of a journalist who apparently found out too late that the subject of his book was not up to scratch—not a member of the wonderful race of auto-fictionalizers, like Joseph Mitchell's Joe Gould and Truman Capote's Perry Smith, on whom the 'non-fiction novel' depends for its life.... The solution that McGinniss arrived at for dealing with MacDonald's characterlessness was not a satisfactory one, but it had to do.

In Malcolm's depiction, it was in order to conceal this deficit that McGinniss turned to social treatises like Lasch's The Culture of Narcissism. This, to her, is McGinniss's professional sin. In Malcolm's eyes McGinniss's moral sin—and the basis for her broader journalistic critique—was to pretend to a belief in MacDonald's innocence. In Malcolm's opinion he does this long after he'd become convinced of the man's guilt. This is the "morally indefensible" position she speaks of on the book's first page.

Gene Weingarten wrote:

What was McGinniss supposed to have done when he realized, midway through the reporting, that the man he was writing about had lied to everyone? That he had killed his wife and older daughter in a rage.... Was McGinniss required to dutifully inform the murderer that he now believed him guilty, and invite him to withdraw his cooperation if he wished, possibly killing the book outright, but certainly killing it as a meaningful, enlightening, powerful examination of the mind of a monster?

== Reaction ==
The book provoked a wide-ranging professional debate when it was serialized in The New Yorker magazine. Joe McGinniss described Malcolm's "omissions, distortions and outright misstatements of fact" as "numerous and egregious" in his rebuttal. As The New York Times reported in March 1989, Malcolm's "declarations provoked outrage among authors, reporters and editors, who rushed last week to distinguish themselves from the journalists Malcolm was describing. They accused her of tarring all in the profession when she was really aiming at everyone but themselves." Although roundly criticized upon first publication—by both newspaper reviewers and media observers like former CBS News president Fred W. Friendly, who described the book's "weakness" and "crabbed vision"—it was also defended by a number of fellow writers. These included the journalists Jessica Mitford and Nora Ephron. Her controversial premise that every journalist was in the business of "gaining [a subject's] trust and betraying them without remorse" has since been accepted by journalists like Gore Vidal and Susan Orlean. Douglas McCollam wrote in the Columbia Journalism Review, "Gore Vidal called source betrayal 'the iron law' of journalism", while Orlean "endorsed Malcolm's thesis as a necessary evil." McCollam further wrote, "In the decade after Malcolm's essay appeared, her once controversial theory became received wisdom." He also writes that "I think both the profession and subjects have paid a high price for our easy acceptance of Malcolm's moral calculus."

In his book A Wilderness of Error, documentarian and writer Errol Morris has found Malcolm's famous opening sentence "to be ludicrous" and takes exception to her assertion that one "cannot learn anything about MacDonald's guilt or innocence" by sorting through the evidence of the case. Morris wrote, "[T]ruth and falsity, guilt and innocence, are not incidental to the story; they are the story."

"Malcolm appears to have created a snake swallowing its own tail," wrote Pulitzer Prize-winning reporter Albert Scardino in The New York Times following the publication of her original two-part series. "She attacks the ethics of all journalists, including herself, and then fails to disclose just how far she has gone in the past in acting the role of the journalistic confidence man."

In his obituary of Joe McGinnis, Gene Weingarten called Malcolm's book "grievously unfair". He added that, "in writing this piece, Janet Malcolm was also wrestling with her own guilt" over allegedly having made up quotes she attributed to Jeffrey Moussaieff Masson in her book In the Freud Archives. Similarly, Alana Pockros wrote:

Yet given that she never noted the obvious similarities between MacDonald v. McGinniss and the case involving her and Masson, many critics concluded ... that the statement was hypocritical.... Some claimed that Malcolm was using The Journalist and the Murderer as a way to process her own feelings. Reading it now, it is hard not to suspect that Malcolm was also thinking about herself here but simply chose not to address it directly.

The book has since become regarded as a classic by some, ranking 97th on the Modern Library's list of the 20th century's "100 Best Works of Nonfiction."
