= Sangro (disambiguation) =

- Sangro river in eastern central Italy
- Castel di Sangro main city of the Alto Sangro e Altopiano delle Cinque Miglia area
- The Miracle of Castel di Sangro account by American writer Joe McGinniss
