= A Wilderness of Error =

Book by Errol Morris

A Wilderness of Error: The Trials of Jeffrey MacDonald
- First edition
- Author: Errol Morris
- Illustrator: Niko Skourtis, Pentagram (design studio)
- Language: English
- Genre: True crime, Journalism
- Publisher: Penguin Press (U.S.)
- Publication date: September 4, 2012 (U.S.)
- Pages: 544

A Wilderness of Error: The Trials of Jeffrey MacDonald is a book by Errol Morris, published in September 2012. It reexamines the case of Jeffrey MacDonald, the Green Beret physician accused of killing his wife and two daughters in their home in Fort Bragg on February 17, 1970, and convicted of the crime on August 29, 1979. MacDonald has been in federal prison since 1982.

On September 25, 2020, FX premiered A Wilderness of Error, a five-part television series based on the book.

== History ==
Morris became preoccupied with the case in the early 1990s, after becoming friends with Harvey Silverglate, then MacDonald's lead appellate attorney. Morris has family in St. Pauls, North Carolina, and visited 544 Castle Drive—the site of the murders—with his wife on trips to the area.

Morris's original intention was to direct a film based on the MacDonald case that would challenge the story presented by government prosecutors at the 1979 trial, and by Joe McGinniss in his 1983 book on the case, Fatal Vision, which proposed that MacDonald was a psychopath who had overdosed on the diet pill Eskatrol and tried to cover up the crime. However, no studios were willing to finance the film, and Morris wrote a book instead.

The book's title comes from the beginning of "William Wilson", the 1839 short story by Edgar Allan Poe. In it, Wilson begs the reader for understanding:

What chance—what one event brought this evil thing to pass, bear with me while I relate... I would fain have them believe that I have been, in some measure, the slave of circumstances beyond human control. I would wish them to seek out for me, in the details I am about to give, some little oasis of fatality amid a wilderness of error.

A Wilderness of Error covers the entire history of the case, arguing that mistakes made by investigators in the first hours after the call were compounded over the years by prosecutors, judges, and journalists, and revealing the problems in the public perception of the case. It includes revelations about Helena Stoeckley, a young drug addict who repeatedly confessed to committing the crime with several associates (although at other times claimed no memory of the events).

Morris's is the fourth major work to be written on the case, after Fatal Vision, The Journalist and the Murderer, a 1990 book by Janet Malcolm that argued that McGinniss's treatment of MacDonald was "a grotesquely magnified version of the ordinary journalistic encounter". In conversation with David Carr of The New York Times, Morris argued that his book aimed to correct the earlier versions of the story. McGinniss's relationship with MacDonald, he argued, was opportunistic and deceptive, and "Malcolm wrote about Joe McGinniss as if he were representative of journalism per se, and I respectfully disagree... There was something very pathological in the relationship between McGinniss and his subject.”

== Design ==
An example of the illustrations inside A Wilderness of Error

The book was designed by Michael Bierut and Yve Ludwig of Pentagram, with illustrations by Niko Skourtis, Lee Cerre, and Matt Delbridge. Morris and the designers worked together, deciding to leave out photographs in favor of documents, diagrams, and "simple line drawings in stark black and white to convey the in-depth analysis of Morris’s arguments as well as the horror and notoriety of the case."

Pentagram also designed a website for the book, where photographs, documents, and other resources used in the making of the book could be displayed.

== Reception ==
A Wilderness of Error has received positive reviews from critics. In The Wall Street Journal, the investigative journalist Edward Jay Epstein strongly recommended the book and wrote, "Mr. Morris's tone is temperate and fair-minded. He is not an angry polemicist but, we cannot help feeling, someone trying to get at the truth." Laura Miller at Salon wrote that "A Wilderness of Error is a beautifully produced book, with chapters set off by line drawings of crucial objects in the case: a toppled coffee table, a flower pot, a rocking horse. It’s reminiscent of the recurring images in The Thin Blue Line, iconic and mysterious, always on the verge of revealing the secrets they stand for but never quite yielding them. Morris may geek out on minutiae and hypotheticals, but he is enough of an artist to convey that every crime scene is a dialogue between time, as it sweeps away the irrecoverable past, and the material world.." And Michael Schaub, a book reviewer for NPR, wrote: "A Wilderness of Error is both great and important—it's a beautifully written book, and it has the potential to change the way the country thinks about a justice system that has obviously lost its way."

The book has also been favorably compared to McGinniss's book. At The Awl, Evan Hughes wrote: "On the proving ground of careful reasoning and impartiality, Morris bests Joe McGinniss by a comfortable margin... It is possible that McGinniss arrived at the correct verdict. But forgive me if I lose a little of my own judicious restraint for a moment. Fatal Vision is a dishonest and unserious book." Michael H. Miller at The New York Observer wrote: "Both Fatal Vision and A Wilderness of Error are equally confident in their antithetical theories, but Mr. Morris is less insidious than Mr. McGinniss, at least allowing for the possibility that Stoeckley was simply overly suggestible—as the prosecutors claimed—and that the presence of a woman matching her description near the MacDonald house in the early-morning hours of February 17 was a coincidence, albeit a highly unlikely one."

Dwight Garner praised the book in his review in The New York Times. Saying it is: "The literary equivalent of one of [Morris's] movies. It’s a rough-hewed documentary master class...A Wilderness of Error upends nearly everything you think you know about these killings and their aftermath....He will leave you 85 percent certain that Mr. MacDonald is innocent. He will leave you 100 percent certain he did not get a fair trial...If this headstrong book doesn’t change your sense of the Jeffrey MacDonald case, I'll eat my Chuck Taylors."

However, several reviewers have criticised A Wilderness of Error and have questioned its core claims. For example, in a long-form report in The Washington Post, Gene Weingarten not only alleges that A Wilderness of Error omits and distorts case evidence, but also claims that Morris has acknowledged these irregularities in a series of personal communications with Weingarten that Weingarten quotes directly. Similarly, lawyer and former The New York Times journalist Raymond Bonner argues in The Daily Beast that Morris' refusal to engage fully with the "plentiful" evidence of MacDonald's guilt—even if only to debunk it—conspires with Morris's "shaky" grasp of legal procedure and case law to make A Wilderness of Error a polemic that "cherry picks" data in service of a "narrative unfolding from the belief that MacDonald is innocent."

In the Columbia Journalism Review, the freelance journalist and podcaster Lindsay Beyerstein says of A Wilderness of Error: "As far as the probative value of the 'withheld' evidence, it’s pretty much a bust," as "the results of DNA testing released in 2006 as 'new evidence' of MacDonald’s innocence ... matched [neither] Helena Stoeckley [n]or her boyfriend Greg Mitchell, whom she named as an accomplice,” and since "[a]ny occupied home will contain hairs and fibers that can’t readily be sourced, especially transient housing like the MacDonalds’ apartment.” Comparing A Wilderness of Error to Fatal Vision, Beyerstein concludes:

Morris tries to blame McGinniss for poisoning the well against MacDonald, but Fatal Vision mostly reported the facts as they were presented at trial. The disappointing truth is that MacDonald was proven guilty beyond a reasonable doubt in 1979 and his lawyers have been grasping at straws ever since.

== Adaptations ==
FX premiered a five-part television series titled A Wilderness of Error, based on the book, on September 25, 2020. The series was directed by Academy Award-nominated film producer Marc Smerling.
