= Fatal Vision (miniseries) =

1984 American television miniseries

- VHS cover
- Based on: Fatal Vision by Joe McGinniss
- Screenplay by: John Gay
- Directed by: David Greene
- Starring: Karl Malden; Eva Marie Saint; Barry Newman; Gary Cole; Andy Griffith
- Composer: Gil Mellé
- Country of origin: United States
- Original language: English
- No. of episodes: 2

Production
- Executive producers: Dan Wigutow; Mike Rosenfeld
- Producer: Richard L. O'Connor
- Cinematography: Stevan Larner
- Editors: Parkie L. Singh; William B. Stich
- Running time: 181 minutes
- Production company: NBC Productions

Original release
- Network: NBC
- Release: November 18 – November 19, 1984

Fatal Vision is a 1984 American true crime drama television miniseries directed by David Greene from a teleplay by John Gay, based on the 1983 book of the same name by Joe McGinniss. The miniseries stars Karl Malden, Eva Marie Saint, Barry Newman, Gary Cole, and Andy Griffith. It recounts the celebrated case of Jeffrey R. MacDonald, the former Green Beret physician who was convicted of murdering his pregnant wife and their two small children.

The miniseries received five Primetime Emmy Award nominations, including Outstanding Drama/Comedy Special, with Malden winning Outstanding Supporting Actor in a Limited Series or a Special for his performance as MacDonald's father-in-law, Freddy Kassab.

== Cast ==
Starring

- Karl Malden as Freddy Kassab
- Eva Marie Saint as Mildred Kassab
- Barry Newman as Bernie Segal
- Gary Cole as Jeffrey R. MacDonald

Special guest star

- Andy Griffith as Victor Worheide

Also starring

- Gary Grubbs as James Blackburn
- Joel Polis as Brian Murtagh
- Mitchell Ryan as Paul Strombaugh
- Wendy Schaal as Colette MacDonald
- Scott Paulin as William Ivory
- Barry Corbin as Franz Grebner
- Albert Salmi as Judge Dupree

Co-starring

- Alexandra Johnson as Helena Stoeckley
- Paddi Edwards as Perry MacDonald
- Frank Dent as Joe McGinniss
- Carmen Argenziano as Col. Pruett
- Andy Wood as Robert Shaw
- Dennis Redfield as Peter Kearns
- Joe Mays as William Posey
- Rex Ryon as Jay MacDonald
- J.P. Bumstead as Col. Rock
- Brandy Gold as Kimberly MacDonald (age 5)
- Judith Barsi as Kimberly MacDonald (age 3)
- Dylan Galer as Kristen MacDonald
- Lance Rosen as Dennis Eisman
- Patricia Duff as Joy
- Nadine van der Velde as Randi
- Laurence Haddon as Gen. Flanagan
- Jack Rader as Provost Marshal
- Kenneth Tigar as Pathologist
- Roy London as Dr. Thornton
- Eugene Butler as Capt. Somers
- Anne Betancourt as St. Mary's Sister

== Production ==
NBC paid $130,000 for the rights to the book, according to McGinniss, a transaction that was complicated by a prior contractual claim by Dell publishers. The miniseries was filmed in Santa Clarita and Pasadena, California, as well as at NBC Studios in Hollywood, Los Angeles, California.

== Reception ==
=== Critical response ===
John J. O'Connor of The New York Times called the story "chilling" and the miniseries "certainly compelling", but stated it was not "as overwhelming as Mr. McGinniss's book." O'Connor also praised the cast, writing that Cole, Malden, and Saint "contribute outstanding performances." Howard Rosenberg of the Los Angeles Times lauded Fatal Vision for its "superb, meticulous storytelling that will have you on the edge of your seat, with Greene managing to convey the brutality of the crime in a surreal way without showing actual violence." Rosenberg also named it "the highest-rated miniseries of the 1984-85 season."

=== Accolades ===
Year	Award	Category	Recipient(s)	Result
1985	35th ACE Eddie Awards	Best Edited Episode for a Television Mini-Series	"Part II"; Parkie L. Singh, William B. Stich	Won
1985	39th Edgar Awards	Best Television Feature or Miniseries	John Gay	Nominated
1985	1st TCA Awards	Program of the Year	Fatal Vision	Nominated
1985	1st TCA Awards	Outstanding Achievement in Drama	Fatal Vision	Nominated
1985	1st TCA Awards	Outstanding Achievement in Specials	Fatal Vision	Nominated
1985	37th Primetime Emmy Awards	Outstanding Drama/Comedy Special	Mike Rosenfeld, Dan Wigutow, Richard L. O'Connor	Nominated
1985	37th Primetime Emmy Awards	Outstanding Supporting Actor in a Limited Series or a Special	Karl Malden	Won
1985	37th Primetime Emmy Awards	Outstanding Directing in a Limited Series or a Special	David Greene	Nominated
1985	37th Primetime Emmy Awards	Outstanding Writing in a Limited Series or a Special	John Gay	Nominated
1985	37th Primetime Emmy Awards	Outstanding Achievement in Makeup	Stephen Abrums	Nominated
1985	1st Artios Awards	Mini-Series or Movie of the Week Casting	Karen Hendel	Won
