= Takeshi Ebisawa =

Japanese arms dealer (born 1964)

- 海老沢武
- Born: 1964 (age 61–62); Utsunomiya, Tochigi, Japan
- Convictions: Conspiracy to traffic nuclear material, Drug trafficking, weapons trafficking and money laundering
- Penalty: 20 Year Imprisonment

Details
- Date apprehended: April 4, 2022
- Imprisoned at: FCI Cumberland

Takeshi Ebisawa (海老沢武; born 1964), also reported as Tsuyoshi Ebisawa (海老沢剛), is a Japanese drug smuggler and arms dealer. In the early 2020s, he unsuccessfully attempted to sell nuclear materials to Iran for the purposes of nuclear proliferation. He was arrested in an American sting operation in 2022, and sentenced to 20 years imprisonment in 2026.

== Background ==
Ebisawa was born in 1964, in a middle-class family in Utsunomiya. He did not complete high school, worked in manual labor, and eventually became a construction manager. By the 2010s, he was involved in various industries across South Asia. According to journalist Jake Adelstein, Ebisawa was a confidence man.

== Criminal activities ==
Since at least 2019, Ebisawa was under investigation by the U.S. Drug Enforcement Administration (DEA) for large-scale narcotics and weapons trafficking. Unbeknownst to him, he engaged with an undercover DEA agent posing as a trafficker, to whom he introduced his international network of criminal associates. Ebisawa conspired to broker the purchase of U.S.-made surface-to-air missiles and other heavy weaponry intended for ethnic armed groups in Myanmar. As partial payment for these weapons, he planned to distribute large quantities of heroin and methamphetamine in the United States, specifically targeting the New York market.

In early 2020, Ebisawa informed undercover agents of his access to substantial quantities of nuclear materials, including uranium and weapons-grade plutonium, which he intended to sell. He provided photographs depicting substances with Geiger counters measuring radiation and lab analyses indicating the presence of thorium and uranium. These materials were sourced from Myanmar, with the expectation that they would be used in the development of nuclear weapons.

Ebisawa was arrested in April 2022 in Manhattan during a DEA sting operation. He was charged with conspiring to traffic nuclear materials, narcotics, and weapons. On 8 January 2025, he pleaded guilty in Manhattan federal court to charges of conspiring to sell nuclear materials from Myanmar to Iran, as well as being involved in drug trafficking and weapons-related crimes, which carry a mandatory minimum sentence of 10 years in prison and the possibility of life imprisonment. Ebisawa was sentenced to 20 years imprisonment on 3 March 2026.

American prosecutors stated that Ebisawa was a leader in the Japanese mafia, or yakuza. However, according to Adelstein, Ebisawa was not a yakuza but may have been mistaken for such.
