= The Delivery Man (novel) =

2008 novel by Joe McGinniss Jr.

- First edition
- Author: Joe McGinniss Jr.
- Language: English
- Genre: Novel
- Publisher: Grove/Atlantic Inc.
- Publication date: 15 January 2008
- Publication place: United States
- Media type: Print (Hardback )
- Pages: 276 pp
- ISBN: 0-8021-7042-0
- OCLC: 156834881
- Dewey Decimal: 813/.6 22
- LC Class: PS3613.C4832 D45 2008

The Delivery Man, is Joe McGinniss Jr.'s first novel, published 15 January 2008.

== Plot summary ==
The plot centers on childhood friends Chase, Michele, and Bailey, who grew up off the Las Vegas Strip. Now in their twenties, the characters engage in illegal professions, and the narrative explores the negative impact of their environment and lifestyles on the younger generation.

The story is told from the perspective of Chase, an aspiring painter just out of college, who had left Las Vegas to study art in New York where he met Julia, an MBA student who represents the promise of a life outside of Las Vegas. After returning to Las Vegas to finish school and finding work as a high school art teacher, Chase struggles to break free of his old life and his old friends, who are entrenched in the Las Vegas life of excess.

Plot summary from the Willamette Week in Portland, OR, "A sympathetic look at the life of drug-using, self-destructing hookers and hustlers sounds like an uphill battle, but the simple truth about these characters is that they aren’t hookers or hustlers. They are aspiring painters, film directors and grad students. Although they inevitably prostitute themselves, they seldom talk about it, because they are ashamed or because they don’t understand what’s happening in their lives. All they want is comfort, to live in the Sun King suite on the 22nd floor of the Palace and order room service. But before they know it, prostitution isn’t even paying the bills; one by one, they go into debt with their own bodies."

== Major themes ==
The novel projects a dark perspective on the culture of Las Vegas, and also on the values inherent in the so-called 'MySpace Generation.' McGinniss based many of the anecdotes in the story on actual interviews he conducted with youth living in Las Vegas.

In a tip of the hat to Bret Easton Ellis' Less than Zero, Joe McGinniss, Jr. in his debut effort The Delivery Man, starts off the novel with these three words: Find Yourself Here. A literary echo of the signifier from Less than Zero: Disappear Here. It sets the stage for parallels between the moral nihilism of 1980s Los Angeles youth culture and the spiritual hollowness to be found among denizens of present-day Las Vegas. The New York Times Sunday Book Review highlights this theme:

"Like its closest spiritual forebear, Bret Easton Ellis’s encyclopedically inertial Less than Zero (1985), The Delivery Man offers unflinching glimpses at mores in free fall, shock treatment in service to a woozy morality tale. "Disappear Here", runs Clay's mantra in Less than Zero, suggested by the enigmatic words on a Los Angeles billboard, "probably an ad for some resort"; Chase fixates on "Find Yourself Here", the motto for the housing development where Michele hopes to land her dream home. (In a sort of diffused paternal imprimatur, Ellis, whose career was kick-started by McGinniss's father, Joe McGinniss, the author of Fatal Vision, reportedly was an early champion of The Delivery Man.)
For Clay and Chase (Vegasland turns out to be another surname-free zone), that stark "Here" resonates with their present-tense hells, where surface hedonism encrusts hearts filled with fear. Frequent italicized interludes stud both novels, flashing back to moments when another scrap of innocence was lost — a technique, for this strain of story, that might have its model in the handful of unexpected first-person chapters that crop up toward the end of Joan Didion’s “Play It as It Lays”.
The Delivery Man begins at the end, with a recuperating Chase held together by medical metal and owing over a hundred grand to the hospital. The rest of the novel (we jump back a month, though the seamless present-tense narration obscures the segue) explains how he got that way. At the end of Ellis’s debut, Clay escapes — he’s still a college student, after all, and as winter break ends, he’ll head back East. In McGinniss’s terse and memorable final sentence, Chase utters two words, and the cycle of violence powers up again, some teeth missing but with dread to burn, the snake fitting its mouth around its tail and biting hard."

== Film, TV or theatrical adaptations ==
According to Variety film rights were sold at auction six months prior to publication and ultimately acquired by Ryan Howe and Thom Mount (The Deer Hunter, Fast Times at Ridgemont High, Natural Born Killers) of Whitsett Hill Entertainment.

Be True Productions’ John Domo ("Big Fish") and Braxton Pope ("The Trust") are set to produce, with Highland Film Group's Arianne Fraser and Delphine Perrier exec producing alongside Molly Hassell. However, this film has yet to come to fruition.

== Reviews ==
Amongst the reviews the reaction is largely positive as can be seen in the New York Times Sunday Book Review which named the book a "NY Times Editor's Choice" in January 2008.

"The Madonna–whore complex is seldom as well defined as in 'The Delivery Man', Joe McGinniss Jr.'s brisk, bleak debut novel...Like its closest spiritual forebear, Bret Easton Ellis' encyclopedically inertial Less than Zero (1985), "The Delivery Man" offers unflinching glimpses at mores in free fall, shock treatment in service to a woozy morality tale...McGinniss manages to whip the yearning and confusion of the woefully inarticulate Chase into dramatic, even gripping fare...Who is to blame for such destructive behavior? The finger pointing leads, unsurprisingly, to the older men who come to Vegas to indulge nightmarishly elaborate desires, accommodated by a surreal environment in which teenagers are marketed on MySpace...Searing...Memorable...Not for the faint of heart."

The "San Francisco Chronicle" review.

"The Delivery Man" is a fast read, sometimes a fun read...McGinniss has a natural storyteller's conviction...The Delivery Man is about Las Vegas as a stand-in for America's dark side: the stifling hot suburbs, the hum of electricity, the kids who sneak into strip shows and the grandmas who leave poker chips as inheritance"

A positive reception is apparent in the "Time Out New York" review.

"McGinniss has obviously done his research, and he comfortably maneuvers through the city’s neighborhoods. And after a while, he manages to balance his commitments to setting and plot, making the argument that the characters’ dysfunctions are an extension of the former."

and the "LA Times" in its review seeks to understand the authors motivation and stylistic approach.

"It's a slick read. McGinniss doesn't spend much time developing emotional relevance for any of his characters – there's no good or bad here, just levels of horrific degradation."

The national monthly magazines "Marie Claire" and "Penthouse" give the novel exceedingly positive reviews, with Penthouse going so far as to call it, "that rare first novel that could well become a classic."

""At first glance, this debut novel looks like a good, short read for the next time you're waiting at the airport. It's an insider's guide to the dark underbelly of twenty-first-century Las Vegas, brimming with brand names, hard bodies, hard drugs, and heavy doses of sex and violence. If that's all you're looking for, The Delivery Man won't disappoint. . . . [short summary] . . . But once you finish it, you won't be able to get it out of your mind-McGinniss uses his fast-paced, B-movie plotline to explore how the flip side of the American dream can often be an inescapable nightmare, much like F. Scott Fitzgerald manipulated the melodrama of The Great Gatsby. In fact, The Delivery Man, like Gatsby, is the story of a lost generation. While Fitzgerald's flappers danced as fast as they could before their world collapsed in Depression and war, McGinniss's losers are stranded in an empty landscape of dead sex, coked-out emotion, and pointless danger. To his credit, McGinniss refuses to take the easy, ironic way out favored by so many contemporary writers who distance the reader from the characters. You see these doomed, wretched people for what they are, and then McGinniss allows them to break your heart. The Delivery Man is that rare first novel that could well become a classic."
- Peter Bloch, Penthouse, January 2008
"Put on your blinders at Borders and head right to this gem... The Delivery Man by Joe McGinniss Jr. It's sex, drugs, and a slew of lost souls in this engrossing story of a 25-year-old known only as Chase. An out-of-luck wannabe artist, he retreats to his hometown – that being Vegas, a downward spiral ensues, thanks to madams and more. Since no less a connoisseur of depraved excess than Bret Easton Ellis helped McGinniss Jr. score a publisher, could The Delivery Man be this decade's Less Than Zero?" – Marie Claire

- Marie Claire,
- Las Vegas Weekly

== Author ==
Joe McGinniss Jr. was born in 1970, the son of American writer Joe McGinniss, who is known for achieving early success at the age of 26 with the New York Times bestseller The Selling of the President (1968).

McGinniss Jr. had published short fiction in Las Vegas Weekly. The Delivery Man is his first novel.
