= The Selling of the President 1968 =

1969 book by Joe McGinniss

- Cover
- Author: Joe McGinniss
- Language: English
- Subject: 1968 United States presidential election
- Publisher: Trident Press
- Publication date: 1969
- Publication place: United States
- Media type: Print
- Pages: 278
- ISBN: 978-0671780364

The Selling of the President 1968 is a 1969 book by American author Joe McGinniss. It was published by Trident Press in October, 1969. The title is a play on the Making of the President books by Theodore White.

The book describes the marketing of Richard Nixon during the 1968 presidential campaign. It has been described as "a classic of political journalism" and a "classic of campaign reporting that first introduced many readers to the stage-managed world of political theater." It was reprinted in 1988 under the title The Selling of the President.

McGinniss became an overnight success when the book, his first, landed on The New York Times bestseller list. He was 26 years old, making him the youngest living writer with that achievement. The book was on the New York Times non-fiction bestseller list for 31 weeks from October 1969 to May 1970.

The idea for the book came to McGinniss almost serendipitously:

[He] stumbled across his book’s topic while taking a train to New York. A fellow commuter had just landed the Hubert Humphrey account and was boasting that 'in six weeks we’ll have him looking better than Abraham Lincoln.' McGinniss tried to get access to Humphrey’s campaign first, but they turned him down. So he called up Nixon’s, and they said yes.".

After becoming a staff White House reporter McGinnis had full access to Richard Nixon. The book is written as a first hand account of the taping of television ads for the 1968 Presidential Campaign. It gives a first hand account of Roger Ailes' marketing genius along with some colorful language used by Nixon.

The book was very well received by both critics and the public. It "spent more than six months on best-sellers lists, and McGinniss sold a lot of those books through television, appearing on the titular shows of Merv Griffin, David Frost and Dick Cavett, among others." Conservative writer William F. Buckley "assumed McGinniss had relied on 'an elaborate deception which has brought joy and hope to the Nixon-haters.' But even Buckley liked the book."

In 1972, the book was adapted into a short-lived Broadway musical.

== Editions ==
The Selling of the President 1968, Oct. 1969, New York:Trident Press (Simon & Schuster). 253 pp. ISBN 0-671-27043-5

The Selling of the President 1968, Oct. 1970, PocketBooks (Simon & Schuster). SBN 671-78036-0, Library of Congress Catalog Card Number 77-92157

The Selling of the President, 1988 reprint, with new introduction by author, New York:Penguin Books. 272 pp. ISBN 0-14-011240-5
