= The Miracle of Castel di Sangro =

Book about Italian football club's first season

- Author: Joe McGinniss
- Language: English
- Genre: Non-fiction
- Publisher: Little, Brown and Company
- Publication date: 1999
- Publication place: United States
- Media type: Print (Hardback & Paperback)
- Pages: 407
- ISBN: 0-316-55736-6

The Miracle of Castel di Sangro is an account by American writer Joe McGinniss of the first season Italian association football club Castel di Sangro Calcio spent in Serie B.
