= Going to Extremes (book) =

1980 book by Joe McGinniss

- Author: Joe McGinniss
- Language: English
- Publication date: 1980
- Publication place: United States
- English publication date: Alfred A. Knopf
- Pages: 285
- ISBN: 0-394-51172-7

Going to Extremes is a non-fiction book by Joe McGinniss. It was first published in 1980. The book is about McGinniss' travels through Alaska for a year. The book became a bestseller.

The Los Angeles Times called it a "vivid memoir."

McGinniss returned to the subject of Alaska in 2009 to write a biography about former Alaska governor Sarah Palin, The Rogue: Searching for the Real Sarah Palin.

== See also ==
- Coming into the Country, a book by John McPhee which covers much of the same subject matter and time frame
