= Fatal Vision =

Book by Joe McGinniss

- First US edition cover
- Author: Joe McGinniss
- Language: English
- Genre: True crime, Biography
- Publisher: Signet Books
- Publication date: August 1983
- Media type: Print (hardcover & paperback)
- ISBN: 978-5550488560
- Followed by: Blind Faith (1989)

Fatal Vision is a 1983 true crime book by journalist and author Joe McGinniss. It resulted in a decades-long dispute spanning several court cases and is discussed in several other published works.

Fatal Vision focuses on Captain Jeffrey R. MacDonald, M.D. and the February 17, 1970 murders of his wife and their two children at their home on Fort Bragg, North Carolina. In 1979, MacDonald was convicted of all three murders and sentenced to life in prison. McGinniss was hired by MacDonald, prior to the start of the criminal trial, but he later became convinced that MacDonald was guilty, and the book supported MacDonald's conviction.

The book sold well, and gave rise to a miniseries of the same name on NBC the next year. The book led to MacDonald suing McGinniss, a case that was settled out of court. The book and its conclusions were challenged by several subsequent publications.

== MacDonald murders and trial ==
In the early morning hours of February 17, 1970, at their home on Fort Bragg, North Carolina, Green Beret Captain Jeffrey MacDonald, M.D., was injured, and his pregnant wife and two young daughters were murdered. MacDonald told Army investigators that they had been attacked by multiple assailants; the details were reminiscent of the sensational Tate-LaBianca murders of the preceding year.

After several months of investigation, Army lawyers charged MacDonald with the three murders, leading to a three-months-plus adversarial hearing that recommended he not be prosecuted. In 1971, his father-in-law, Freddy Kassab, became progressively suspicious of MacDonald and sought formal reopening of the case. In July 1974, a Federal judge acted on a citizen's criminal complaint by Kassab and others, by putting the case before a grand jury. MacDonald was indicted for all three murders in January 1975, and after two rounds of appeals to Appeal and Supreme Courts, went to trial on July 16, 1979.

After a six-week criminal trial, MacDonald was convicted of second-degree murder of his wife and older daughter and of first-degree murder of his younger daughter on August 29, 1979 and was immediately sentenced to three consecutive life terms (equivalent to life imprisonment). Afterwards, MacDonald raised further appeals, one of which set him free on bail for about 15 months before yet another reversal by the Supreme Court in March 1982.

== Fatal Vision ==
In June 1979, at the suggestion of his lawyer Bernard Segal, MacDonald had hired McGinniss to write a book about MacDonald's innocence. MacDonald had approached multiple writers, offering himself as subject in return for a share of the book's proceeds so that it might cover his legal costs. A deal was struck, and it was arranged that McGinniss would live alongside MacDonald and his legal team in a house that Segal had rented.

But McGinniss later became convinced that MacDonald was guilty of murdering his family. In the spring of 1983, McGinniss published Fatal Vision, saying that he had become convinced of MacDonald's guilt early in his research due to MacDonald's behavior and the court evidence, and presenting detailed arguments for guilt. As a motive, McGinniss suggests that MacDonald killed his family in a spur-of-the-moment fit of psychotic rage as a result of taking amphetamines.

Around the time of the murders Fort Bragg had been experiencing problems and crime associated with drug-addicted soldiers returning from Vietnam.

== Lawsuits ==
MacDonald expected that the book would show his innocence; however, like other authors MacDonald had contacted, McGinniss insisted on a signed release from MacDonald, allowing him to write freely, and the final version was precisely the opposite of what MacDonald had expected.

In 1984, MacDonald sued McGinniss for fraud and breach of contract, claiming he had breached an agreement to write a book about his innocence. In August 1987, the jury hearing the case deadlocked, and the case was settled out of court in November with MacDonald receiving $325,000.

The Kassabs, MacDonald's in-laws, then sued MacDonald to try to prevent him from profiting from a crime for which he had been convicted. This suit was also settled, with the Kassabs receiving a percentage of the book's profit, but also paying for MacDonald's legal expenses.

== Subsequent publications ==
In 1990, The New Yorker writer Janet Malcolm published an article, "The Journalist and the Murderer", with the thesis that journalism inevitably conflicts with morality as it is usually conceived; she considered Fatal Vision as the specific case leading her to this conclusion, and said that McGinniss committed a "morally indefensible" act in pretending that he believed MacDonald was innocent, even after he became convinced of his guilt.

In 1995, Jerry Allen Potter and Fred Bost published Fatal Justice: Reinvestigating the MacDonald Murders, attacking the murder jury's conclusions.

In 2012, Errol Morris published A Wilderness of Error reviewing the MacDonald case, including discussions of McGinniss's book and Malcolm's study.

In 2012 (after McGinniss's diagnosis with terminal prostate cancer), McGinniss published an essay-length e-book, Final Vision: The Last Word on Jeffrey MacDonald, rebutting MacDonald's assertions in his multiple post-1983 appeals.

In 2017 (after McGinniss's death in 2014), the book was adapted into a film.
