= Joe McGinniss =

American writer (1942–2014)

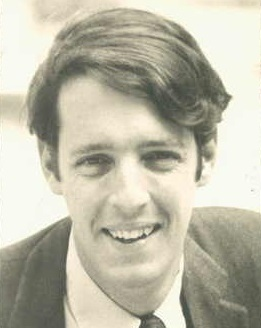
- McGinniss in 1969
- Born: December 9, 1942; New York City, U.S.
- Died: March 10, 2014 (aged 71); Worcester, Massachusetts, U.S.
- Education: College of the Holy Cross (BA)
- Occupations: Journalist; author
- Spouse: Nancy Doherty
- Children: 5, including Joe Jr.
- Writing career
- Language: English
- Period: 1964–2014
- Genre: Non-fiction
- Subject: True crime
- Notable works: The Selling of the President 1968 (1969); Going to Extremes (1980); Fatal Vision (1983); Blind Faith (1989); Cruel Doubt (1992); The Miracle of Castel di Sangro (1999)
- Website: www.joemcginniss.net

Joseph Ralph McGinniss Sr. (December 9, 1942 – March 10, 2014) was an American non-fiction writer and novelist. He was the author of twelve books.

McGinniss first came to prominence with the best-selling The Selling of the President 1968 which described the marketing of then-presidential candidate Richard Nixon. He is popularly known for his trilogy of bestselling true crime books—Fatal Vision, Blind Faith and Cruel Doubt—which were adapted into TV miniseries in the 1980s and 90s. His last book was The Rogue: Searching for the Real Sarah Palin, an account of Sarah Palin, the former governor of Alaska who was the 2008 Republican vice-presidential nominee.

== Early life and education ==
McGinniss was born in Manhattan, the only child of travel agent Joseph A. McGinniss and Mary (née Leonard), a secretary at CBS. He was raised in Forest Hills, Queens, and Rye, New York. In his youth he was given a chance to pick a middle name and chose Ralph, after the baseball player Ralph Kiner.

McGinniss attended Archbishop Stepinac High School in White Plains and then was educated at the College of the Holy Cross in Worcester, Massachusetts, graduating in 1964. After his application to the Columbia University Graduate School of Journalism was rejected, something he later pointed to with pride, he became a general assignment reporter at the Worcester Telegram. He left within a year to become a sportswriter for the Philadelphia Bulletin before joining The Philadelphia Inquirer as a general interest columnist. In 1979, he became a writer-in-residence at the Los Angeles Herald Examiner.

From 1982 to 1985, he taught creative writing at Bennington College in Vermont. While at Bennington, his students included Donna Tartt and Bret Easton Ellis. At the time of his death, The New York Times described him as a "gregarious man who was generous with other writers."

== Career ==
=== The Selling of the President ===
McGinniss's first book, The Selling of the President 1968, landed on The New York Times Best Seller list when he was 26 years old, making him the youngest living writer with that achievement. The book was on The New York Times non-fiction bestseller list for 31 weeks from October 1969 to May 1970. The book described the marketing of Richard Nixon during the 1968 presidential campaign. The idea for the book came to McGinniss almost serendipitously:

[He] stumbled across his book's topic while taking a train to New York. A fellow commuter had just landed the Hubert Humphrey account and was boasting that 'in six weeks we'll have him looking better than Abraham Lincoln.' McGinniss tried to get access to Humphrey's campaign first, but they turned him down. So he called up Nixon's, and they said yes.

The book was well received by critics and has been recognized as a "classic of campaign reporting that first introduced many readers to the stage-managed world of political theater." Fox News chairman and CEO Roger Ailes, who served as a Richard Nixon campaign adviser and featured prominently in the book, said in a statement that McGinniss "changed political writing forever in 1968." It "spent more than six months on best-sellers lists ... and McGinniss sold a lot of those books through television, appearing on the titular shows of Merv Griffin, David Frost, and Dick Cavett, among others." Conservative writer William F. Buckley, Jr., "assumed McGinniss had relied on 'an elaborate deception which has brought joy and hope to the Nixon-haters.' But even Buckley liked the book."

After the success of his book in 1968, McGinniss left the Inquirer to write books full-time. He next wrote a novel, The Dream Team. It was followed by Heroes and Going to Extremes, a nonfiction account of his year exploring Alaska.

=== True crime ===
==== Fatal Vision ====
In the 1980s and early '90s, McGinniss wrote a trilogy of bestselling true crime books, Fatal Vision, Blind Faith and Cruel Doubt. All three books were made into television miniseries, with Fatal Vision (1984) and Blind Faith (1990) receiving Emmy Award nominations.

His 1983 account of the Jeffrey MacDonald murder case, Fatal Vision, became a sensation and has never been out of print. MacDonald sued McGinniss in 1984, alleging that McGinniss pretended to believe MacDonald innocent after he had already come to the conclusion that MacDonald was guilty, in order to continue MacDonald's cooperation with him. After a six-week civil trial in 1987 that resulted in a hung jury, his publisher's insurance company chose to settle out of court with MacDonald for a reported $325,000.

In her 1990 book The Journalist and the Murderer, based on her two-part 1989 The New Yorker piece, Janet Malcolm used the McGinniss-MacDonald trial to explore the problematic relationship between journalists and their subjects. McGinniss responded to Malcolm in an epilogue included in later editions of Fatal Vision and on his website.

In 1995, Jerry Allen Potter and Fred Bost published Fatal Justice: Reinvestigating the MacDonald Murders, arguing against the jury's guilty verdict of triple murder against MacDonald.

After more than 20 years of silence on the subject of the MacDonald murders, McGinniss testified under subpoena, in a 2012 North Carolina hearing, on whether MacDonald should be granted a new trial. He then wrote and published Final Vision, revisiting the case, with the online journalism site Byliner.com. (MacDonald's appeal was denied on July 24, 2014, as McGinniss had predicted.)

==== Blind Faith and Cruel Doubt ====
Blind Faith (published by G.P. Putnam's Sons in 1989) is based on the 1984 Marshall murder case in which American businessman Robert O. Marshall was charged with (and later convicted of) the contract killing of his wife, Maria. Described as "suspenseful and engrossing reading, with a courtroom drama that is cathartic as well as gripping" by Anne Rice in The New York Times, it was followed by Cruel Doubt (published by Simon and Schuster in 1991). Cruel Doubt documents the 1988 murder of Lieth Von Stein and the attempted murder of his wife, Bonnie, by his stepson, Chris Pritchard, and two of Pritchard's friends. In its review of Cruel Doubt, The Boston Globe remarked, "McGinniss is the Alfred Hitchcock of the true-crime genre, a genre he often transcends."

=== The Last Brother ===
McGinniss's book The Last Brother: The Rise and Fall of Teddy Kennedy was published in 1993. The volume was widely panned for its skimpy sourcing, lack of attribution, wild suppositions, lack of footnotes, possible plagiarism and prurient outlook. In The New York Times, Christopher Lehmann-Haupt called it "half-baked" and added, "The book isn't bad; it's awful". "It is, by a wide margin, the worst book I have reviewed in nearly three decades; quite simply, there is not an honest page in it," wrote Jonathan Yardley in The Washington Post. Yardley called it "a genuinely, unrelievedly rotten book, one without a single redeeming virtue, an embarrassment that should bring nothing except shame to everyone associated with it." He also characterized it as "slimy, meretricious and cynical." Also in the Post, Richard Cohen wrote, "This is not biography; this is pornography." "McGinniss concludes that the Kennedys are all-American frauds," wrote Publishers Weekly. "The reader will wonder if McGinniss isn't one also." James Atlas wrote that the book was, "even by the standards of celebrity journalism, a sordid spectacle." In The New Republic, Joe Klein called it an "odiography."

McGinniss suggested to the Los Angeles Times that Kennedy himself had orchestrated a smear campaign against him. "This has been a practice of theirs [the Kennedy family] for years," he said and quoted a Boston Globe reporter who recently wrote that the family "'only had two approaches to journalists, either buying or demonizing them." McGinnis declared, "They didn't buy me." He added, "They want to ... mutilate the body so badly that no other messenger is ever going to come down the pike."

Sales of the book were ultimately "disappointing," reported The Baltimore Sun.

=== The Rogue: Searching for the Real Sarah Palin ===
McGinniss returned to the subject of Alaska in 2008 to research an article for Conde Nast's business magazine Portfolio about then-Governor Palin's promotion of a $26 billion plan to construct a natural gas pipeline from the North Slope of Alaska to a pipeline hub in Canada. In 2009, McGinniss signed a contract to write an unauthorized biography about Palin and began research which took him to Alaska that fall and again in the spring of 2010. In late May he rented a house next door to Palin's home on Lake Lucille in Wasilla. On her Facebook page, Palin warned him to stay away from her children and mused: "Wonder what kind of material he'll gather while overlooking Piper's bedroom, my little garden, and the family's swimming hole?" causing a brief media frenzy and, according to The Washington Post, "fury from Palin fans". McGinniss responded that there was no view of anyone's bedroom from the rental house and suggested that Palin should have simply come over with a plate of cookies and had a civil discussion with him.

McGinniss left Alaska in September 2010 to write his book on the Palin phenomenon. Broadway Books, a division of Random House, published The Rogue: Searching for the Real Sarah Palin on September 20, 2011. According to advance reviews, the book alleges premarital sex and drug use, allegedly including conjecture that Sarah Palin is not the biological mother of her son, Trig Palin. Early reviews by the Los Angeles Times and The New York Times criticized The Rogue for its use of unnamed sources and for its tone.

On September 26, 2011, ABC News reported that Palin's attorney John Tiemessen had written a letter to the book's author and publisher saying that Palin might sue them "for knowingly publishing false statements." No such lawsuit was ever filed.

In The Washington Post, Gene Weingarten called The Rogue "thin and crappy and lazy, filled with poorly sourced innuendo."

=== Other works ===
In 1995, McGinniss was awarded a $1 million advance as well as a media seat at the O. J. Simpson murder case, expecting to write a book about it. But after sitting through the entire protracted trial, McGinniss decided that he could not write any book about the case and he returned the entire $1 million advance to his publisher. After Simpson was acquitted, McGinniss stated that the trial had been "a farce."

His next book was the critically acclaimed The Miracle of Castel di Sangro. Published in 1999, the book followed the fortunes of an Italian soccer team from a tiny town during one dramatic season in the big leagues. The Big Horse was published in 2004. In his next book, Never Enough (2007), McGinniss returned to his study of the dark side of the American family with a nonfiction account of the murder of investment banker Robert Kissel by his wife Nancy in Hong Kong, called the milkshake murder.

== Later life and death ==
In his later years, as his career waned, McGinniss struggled with alcoholism and depression. He was described by his son, novelist Joe McGinniss Jr., as a sometimes neglectful father who nonetheless encouraged his son's writing career. Lloyd Grove wrote that "in good times and bad, he threw himself headlong into an unforgiving, brutal but seductively rewarding line of work."

On January 24, 2013, he confirmed the diagnosis of terminal prostate cancer which had been revealed online in May 2012. McGinniss died March 10, 2014, at UMass Memorial Medical Center in Worcester from the disease at the age of 71.

A private memorial was held in New York in May 2014. Guests such as Roger Ailes, Andrew Sullivan, Gene Weingarten, and Ray Hudson spoke. As news of McGinniss' death spread, several tributes and obituaries were published in publications such as The New York Times, Associated Press, The Washington Post, The Dish, and others. The New York Times Public Editor Margaret Sullivan wrote:

The phrase 'sui generis' – in a class of his own — seems to have been made for Joe McGinniss. He was his own kind of author, and man. And, as such, will be missed.

== Bibliography ==
- "Death Stalks a Grieving Father" (1967) in The Philadelphia Inquirer
- The Selling of the President 1968 (1969), ISBN 0-14-011240-5, Penguin, 272 pages.
- The Dream Team (1972), ISBN 0-14-003915-5, Penguin Books, 160 pages.
- Heroes (1976), ISBN 0-671-69511-8, Touchstone Books, 176 pages.
- Going to Extremes (1980), ISBN 978-1-935347-03-3, Epicenter Press, 320 pages.
- Fatal Vision (1983), ISBN 0-399-12816-6, Putnam Adult, 663 pages.
- Blind Faith (1989), ISBN 978-0-399-13352-7, G. P. Putnam's Sons, 381 pages.
- Cruel Doubt (1991), ISBN 978-0-671-67947-7, Simon & Schuster, 464 pages.
- The Last Brother: The Rise and Fall of Teddy Kennedy (1993), ISBN 978-0-671-67945-3, Simon & Schuster, 624 pages.
- The Miracle of Castel di Sangro (1999), ISBN 0-316-55736-6, Little Brown and Company; 407 pages.
- The Big Horse (2004), ISBN 978-0-7432-6114-2, Simon & Schuster, 272 pages.
- Never Enough (2007), ISBN 978-0-7432-9636-6, Simon & Schuster, 368 pages.
- The Rogue: Searching for the Real Sarah Palin (2011), ISBN 978-0-307-71892-1, Crown, 336 pages

== See also ==
- Fatal Vision - 1984 television miniseries
- Blind Faith - 1990 television miniseries
- Cruel Doubt - 1992 television miniseries
