= Barricade Books =

American independent publishing company

- Founded: 1989
- Founder: Lyle Stuart
- Country of origin: United States
- Headquarters location: Fort Lee, New Jersey
- Distribution: National Book Network (US); Turnaround Publisher Services (UK)
- Key people: Jonathan Bernstein, owner
- Publication types: Books

Barricade Books is an independent publishing company, based in Fort Lee, New Jersey, specializing in controversial non-fiction titles, including Holocaust memoirs, true crime, and Mafia titles.

== History ==
The genesis for Barricade Books was Lyle Stuart Inc., founded by Lyle Stuart (1922-2006), the publisher of such titles as Naked Came the Stranger, Ordeal by Linda Lovelace, and The Sensuous Woman by "J". Stuart developed a reputation for taking on controversial titles.

One of the publisher's most controversial titles was The Anarchist Cookbook, released in 1970, which included recipes for making bombs.

In 1989, the Barricade Books imprint was established. In 1995, Barricade Books published the bestseller The Housekeeper's Diary by Wendy Berry. The violently racist anti-government novel The Turner Diaries, by Andrew Macdonald, was published in 1996, resulting in criticism. A bestseller, Sex and the Single Girl by Helen Gurley Brown and originally published by Bernard Geis Associates, was republished by Barricade in 2002.

In 1997, the publisher was forced into bankruptcy by a $3.1 million libel judgment arising from a lawsuit filed by Steve Wynn over the biography Running Scared by John L. Smith. The company continued to publish and the judgment was eventually reversed.

Upon Lyle Stuart's death in 2006, his wife Carole Stuart became publisher. She had previously worked in a variety of departments for Lyle Stuart Inc. and Barricade Books. In 2018, Carole Stuart sold Barricade to Jonathan Bernstein.

== Notable authors ==
Other notable titles include a memoir by Avery Corman, My Old Neighborhood Remembered; a memoir by the attorney Raoul Felder, Reflections in a Mirror; Bruce Mowday's Pickett's Charge, The Untold Story; a biography of mob daughter Susan Berman, Murder of a Mafia Daughter, by Cathy Scott; and Bent Corydon's biography/exposé of Scientology founder L. Ron Hubbard, which Corydon titled L. Ron Hubbard, Messiah or Madman?
