= David Berman (mobster) =

American organized crime figure (1903–1957)

- 1955 publicity photo
- Born: 1903; Odessa, Ukraine
- Died: June 16, 1957 (aged 53–54); Las Vegas, Nevada
- Other name: "Davie the Jew"
- Occupation: Organized crime figure
- Spouse: Gladys Ewald
- Children: Susan Berman

David Berman (1903 – June 16, 1957) was a Jewish-American organized crime figure active in Sioux City, Iowa, the Twin Cities, and the Las Vegas Strip. He was a casino gambling pioneer in Las Vegas, where he was a partner with mobster Bugsy Siegel at the Flamingo Hotel. Berman died in 1957 during surgery.

== Early life ==
Berman was born into an Orthodox Jewish family in Odesa, Russian Empire. His father was a former rabbinical student who played the violin. When he was a young child, his father departed for America and settled in Ashley, North Dakota, on land provided by Baron Maurice de Hirsch's Jewish Colonisation Association. The elder Berman then sent for his wife and children. David's mother was reportedly horrified after getting off the train and realizing that they had exchanged the relative warmth of Odesa for the icy cold of the Great Plains.

== Organized crime ==
After failing on the land, the Bermans moved to Sioux City, Iowa, where David began his criminal career. At the age of 13, he ran a crew of teenaged thugs committing petty extortions and eventually a string of illegal moonshine distilleries during the Prohibition era. He then went on to supplement his earnings by also leading an armed robbery crew.

In 1927, Berman was allegedly recruited from the Midwest by the New York City-based Bugs and Meyer Mob in order to kidnap wealthy criminals for ransom. However, after Berman and Joe Marcus' kidnapping of Brooklyn real estate baron and bootlegger Abraham Scharlin, both kidnappers were surprised by the NYPD while waiting for the $20,000 ransom payment in Central Park. Marcus drew his side arm and was shot dead. When offered a deal after his arrest in return for testifying against those who had hired him, meaning Meyer Lansky and Bugsy Siegel, Berman famously quipped: "Hell, the worst I can get is life." For his role in solving the Scharlin kidnapping, NYPD Detective John Cordes became the only police officer in that department's history to be awarded a second Medal of Honor.

Berman was convicted of felonious assault and sentenced to twelve years in Sing Sing Prison. After being paroled after seven and a half years and first receiving the blessing of Moe Sedway and Meyer Lansky, Berman moved to Minneapolis, where he operated a major illegal gambling ring in rivalry with the "AZ Syndicate" led by fellow Jewish gangsters Yiddy Bloom and Kid Cann and the Irish mob led by Tommy Banks.

One of Berman's most feared enforcers during his Twin Cities years was Israel Alderman, a notoriously homicidal Jewish hitman from North Minneapolis, who was nicknamed "Ice Pick Willie". Davie's brother, "Chickie" Berman, also worked for him. He was nicknamed "Davie the Jew" and led his organization first from the Radisson Hotel and then from the Dyckman luxury hotel.

An FBI report says of Berman during this era, "Inasmuch as he had tasted confinement for a considerable length of time, he is a most dangerous type of law violator, due to the great price he is willing to pay in order to avoid another state of confinement. Has a great ability to control of his emotions and where prior to being sent away to Sing Sing Prison for a lengthy term he was considered tough, subsequent to his release he is considered vicious. Has a short choppy type of speech, was not too well educated but disguised this fact with little conversation."

According to his daughter Susan's memoir Easy Street, Davie Berman ordered the contract killings of two Italian-American brothers who had been sent by Chicago Outfit acting boss Al Capone to organize a Mafia crime family in the Twin Cities.

The Chicago wiseguys' murders allegedly resulted in a sit-down between Capone and Berman's protectors in the Genovese crime family of New York City. Capone demanded Berman's assassination and the New York mobsters spoke in Berman's defense. At the end of the sit-down, Capone grudgingly backed down, but vowed to kill Berman if he ever came to Chicago.

According to Twin Cities crime historian Paul Maccabee, FBI files reveal that David Berman contributed very heavily to Marvin L. Kline's mayoral campaign under the understanding that, if Kline won the election, Berman would take over illegal gambling in Minneapolis. Therefore, during Kline's 1941–1945 term as Mayor, Berman briefly eclipsed his rivals and became the leader of the Minneapolis criminal underworld. According to Susan Berman, when Kline was the Mayor, Tommy Banks and Kid Cann had to work for her father.

According to both David's daughter, Susan, and Neal Karlen, David Berman also used his crew to intimidate and terrorize the Silver Shirts, an antisemitic militia financed by Nazi Germany. Berman once personally physically assaulted Silvershirt leader William Dudley Pelley, and warned his followers to keep their antisemitic rhetoric out of Minneapolis, or else.

== World War II ==
In 1936, Berman and his crew had violently disrupted meetings of the Silver Shirts, an American fascist and pro-Nazi organization, at a Minneapolis Elks Club and elsewhere. Susan Berman later learned that the Nuremberg Laws and the Holocaust enraged her father so intensely that he enlisted in the Canadian Army. Berman had, in fact, previously been turned away by the United States military for being a convicted felon. In addition, the attack on Pearl Harbor had not yet brought the United States into World War II.

Berman and his Minnesota friend Nathan Gittlewich both fought in the European Theater as soldiers with the 18th Armoured Car Regiment, 12th Manitoba Dragoons, II Canadian Corps, which first experienced combat during the Normandy Landings. Berman was well-liked, and his fellow soldiers did not know that he was a major figure in Jewish-American organized crime. After being severely wounded by enemy fire, briefly presumed dead, and declared unfit for further active service, Berman returned to the Twin Cities.

== Las Vegas ==
The December 1944 issue of the Public Press, edited by a Jewish journalist and Walter Liggett-style anti-corruption and anti-racketeering crusader named Arthur Kasherman, featured the headline Kline Administration Most Corrupt Regime in the History of the City. A month later, on the night of Jan. 22, 1945, Kasherman was ambushed after eating dinner with a friend and shot dead on a sidewalk at 15th Street and Chicago Avenue in Minneapolis. Kasherman's murder made the front pages of newspapers across the Twin Cities, but few in Minneapolis were surprised when the police investigation was quickly shut down.

Although Kasherman's murder remains unsolved, it ensured the electoral victory and first term of racket busting Minneapolis Mayor Hubert Humphrey, who is now known to have destroyed Berman's operations, while leaving those of Tommy Banks and Kid Cann largely unscathed. Berman moved his crew to the Las Vegas Strip and operated there in concert with Genovese Family associates Bugsy Siegel, Dutch Goldberg and Moe Sedway.

According to journalists Ed Reid and Ovid Demaris, Berman was involved in the mob's investigation into Siegel and the missing profits of the Flamingo Hotel and Casino. Both journalists further allege that Berman, "had talked to Benny a number of times about it, warning him that if the matter was not settled soon he was going to find himself minus a head".

Twenty minutes after the 1947 assassination of Bugsy Siegel in Beverly Hills, California, Gus Greenbaum, Moe Sedway and David Berman walked into the lobby of the Flamingo and announced that they were in charge.

Berman died on the operating table during surgery to remove polyps from his colon on Father's Day, 1957. His daughter, journalist Susan Berman, always maintained that her father died under mysterious circumstances, but all indications were that he died of a heart attack during surgery.

== Family ==
While he lived in Minneapolis, Berman met and married Elizabeth Ewald, a German-American dancer who used the stage name "Gladys Evans". Ewald converted from Lutheranism to Judaism prior to her marriage to Berman.

During their tenure as Las Vegas mob royalty, Gladys Berman regularly hosted Seders for thousands at the Riviera Hotel on the Las Vegas Strip.

Gladys Berman died shortly after the death of her husband due to an overdose of barbiturates. It remains unclear, however, whether Gladys Berman's death was a suicide or a mob hit motivated by her refusal to hand over her husband's control of multiple Las Vegas casinos. At the time of her death, Gladys Ewald Berman was only 39 years old.

The couple's only child was journalist Susan Berman, who was gradually paid a total of $4.3 million by the American Mafia in return for her inherited stake in Las Vegas casinos and other properties. Berman also wrote a memoir about growing up as Twin Cities and Las Vegas mob royalty titled Easy Street (1981). In her memoir, Susan indicated she knew nothing about her father's criminal activities until an acquaintance brought to her attention the mentions of her father in the book The Green Felt Jungle.

Susan Berman was murdered execution style with a 9mm handgun inside her rented home in the Los Angeles suburb of Benedict Canyon on December 23, 2000. On September 17, 2021, a Los Angeles County jury convicted real estate billionaire Robert Durst of Berman's first degree murder. Durst was also convicted of many additional Special Circumstance charges, which caused him to receive a sentence of life imprisonment without parole.
