= L. Ron Hubbard, Messiah or Madman? =

Book by Bent Corydon

L. Ron Hubbard: Messiah or Madman?
- Cover
- Author: Bent Corydon
- Language: English
- Subject: L. Ron Hubbard
- Publisher: Lyle Stuart
- Publication date: 1987; 1992; 1995/1996
- Publication place: United States
- Media type: Print (Hardcover and Paperback)
- Pages: 1987, 402 pages; 1992, 460 pages; 1995/1996, 464 pages
- ISBN: 0-8184-0444-2
- OCLC: 16130709
- Dewey Decimal: 299/.936/0924 B 19
- LC Class: BP605.S2 C67 1987

L. Ron Hubbard, Messiah or Madman? is a posthumous biography of Scientology founder L. Ron Hubbard written by Bent Corydon, which makes extensive use of interviews he conducted with Hubbard's son Ronald DeWolf. Though originally published in 1987 by Lyle Stuart Inc., the book was re-issued in a paperback edition on July 25, 1992, and a hardcover edition in October 1995, both by publisher Barricade Books. The 1995 edition also featured Brian Ambry as principal researcher. The first edition of the book listed DeWolf as coauthor.

== History ==
Corydon had previously been head of the Scientology mission at Riverside, California, and used letters, court transcripts, affidavits, and first-hand accounts to write the biography of L. Ron Hubbard, the founder of the Church of Scientology. In addition to extensive interviews with Ronald DeWolf, Hubbard's son by his first wife, Corydon corresponded with others, such as Sara Northrup Hollister, Hubbard's second wife.

In an open letter to the New York Times, Lyle Stuart, the book's publisher, said he had poured all the profits from the book into educational advertisements about Scientology. The letter described the group as a cult.

Prior to publication of the first edition, DeWolf retracted his statements and sued Stuart claiming that he had been misrepresented and the book was inaccurate. DeWolf also claimed Corydon had breached their authorship agreement, and that he had not been paid for his work. He demanded that the publisher remove his name from book. DeWolf's demands were not met, and the book was published naming DeWolf as co-author.

DeWolf died in 1991. In the 1992 edition of the book, Corydon said that he believed DeWolf was under duress due to debt and poor health when he made the retraction. The later editions of the book do not name DeWolf as an author, although his interviews are still used.

== Legal challenges from the Church of Scientology ==
In order to prevent the publication of the biography, the Church of Scientology engaged the publisher, Lyle Stuart Inc., in a legal dispute, claiming copyright infringement. The claim was dismissed. The original cover design featured a volcano similar to the one depicted on the cover of Dianetics, but Scientology won an injunction against its use. The legal dispute was ongoing when the publisher wished to distribute the work, so Stuart altered the design of the book cover to instead feature a letter addressed "Dear Bookbuyer:"

This is not the jacket we planned for this book. We have been forced to use this makeshift design in order to safeguard our right to ship MESSIAH OR MADMAN? [caps in original text] to the public. We consider it our duty to make this important book available to you as soon as possible – despite the ongoing legal harassment we are suffering. The contents of L. RON HUBBARD, MESSIAH OR MADMAN? justify the enormous legal and personal problems that we have gone through. We are convinced that this book must not be suppressed at any cost! Later editions will bear a jacket consistent with our usual high standards. But since a restraining order had been placed on our first printing because of litigation over jacket design, we felt it imperative to release books to the public immediately. We are sure that the bookbuying public will understand, and support us in our fight to protect First Amendment liberties.

The Church of Scientology, through its attorney Timothy Bowles, sent threatening letters to those planning to publish reviews of the book. The following message was sent to the St. Petersburg Times:

It has come to our attention that...[you] are considering publication of a review of L. Ron Hubbard, Messiah or Madman? by Bent Corydon....If you forward one of his lies you will find yourself in court facing not only libel and slander charges, but also charges for conspiracy to violate civil rights. If you publish anything at all on it, you may still find yourself defending charges in court...We know a whole lot more about your institution and motives than you think.

The newspaper refused to comply with Scientology's requests, and published not only the review, but also the letter. It went on to win an award from the Columbia Journalism Review.

== Reception ==
Writing for the Marburg Journal of Religion, historian and theologian Marco Frenschkowski (de) called the book "[A] very important book but also a deeply problematical item" and "Many of the claims made in Corydon's book are very sensationalist. It is quite believable that Hubbard Jr. was not happy with the book even when he wanted to expose the darker side of his father."

A New York Times book review stated, "This book, supposedly a biography of Hubbard (who died in 1986), turns out to be a series of tales about naïve people who were put through abusive tests before they were allowed to pay thousands of dollars to an organization that humiliated them... [Hubbard] is portrayed as a greedy, vindictive man whose hidden agenda centered on hoarding vast sums of money and escaping legal accountability."

== See also ==
- Bibliography of books critical of Scientology
- Scientology controversies
- A Piece of Blue Sky, also had been involved in legal issues with Scientology
- Bare Faced Messiah, biography, also had been involved in legal issues with Scientology
- Blown for Good, a memoir by a former Scientologist
