= Murder of a Mafia Daughter =

True crime book by Cathy Scott

- Expanded 20th Anniversary Edition
- Author: Cathy Scott
- Language: English
- Genre: Crime, Biography Serial Killers
- Publisher: Barricade Books (1st and 2nd eds) Crime, She Writes (20th Anniv ed)
- Publication date: Jan. 2022 (20th Anniversary ed); June 2015 (2nd ed); Dec. 2002 (1st ed)
- Media type: Print (trade-size paperback and hardcover), Audible Audio Edition, Amazon Kindle eBook
- Pages: 335 pp (Paperback 20th Anniversary Edition)
- ISBN: 978-0578259147

Murder of a Mafia Daughter: The Life and Tragic Death of Susan Berman is a nonfiction book by author and journalist Cathy Scott about the 2000 murder of Susan Berman. Murder of a Mafia Daughter was first released in hardcover in 2002 by Barricade Books. A 2nd edition in trade-size paperback was released in June 2015 following the March 2015 arrest of suspect Robert Durst in Berman's murder. After the trial and conviction of the Durst for Berman's murder, and then Durst's death, a 20th Anniversary updated edition of the book was released.

== Storyline ==
The title is a biography and true account of Susan Berman and her December 23, 2000, murder. A journalist, screenwriter and author of Easy Street, Berman grew up as mob royalty in Las Vegas. She was discovered dead in her rented Beverly Hills home, lying face down in a spare bedroom after her dogs were seen running in and out of an open back door. Originally, Los Angeles police thought Berman’s death was a mob hit, because Berman’s father, Davie Berman, was a Jewish mobster with ties to the Chicago syndicate, plus Berman was killed with a single bullet to the back of her head, which at the time was believed to be a contract-style hit.

A 2003 review of the book by Las Vegas CityLife pointed out that while Berman’s murder appeared to be a mob-style execution, the author “presents evidence that Susan's killing had nothing to do with her father's Mob connections."

The book describes a person of interest identified by LAPD detectives as Robert Durst, Berman’s college friend from the University of California, Los Angeles, whose wife, Kathie Durst, disappeared in 1982. While Durst was a person of interest, he wasn't charged with Berman's death until more than 14 years later when the LAPD issued an arrest warrant and Durst was apprehended on March 14, 2015, in New Orleans. True Crime Zine, in a review of the book, wrote that "detectives came to suspect one of (Susan's) long-time friends but have never been able to charge him with murder."

KNPR, in a 2017 interview with Scott, wrote that Murder of a Mafia Daughter "details Berman's life in Las Vegas, her time as a journalist in San Francisco, her ties to Durst and her murder on Christmas Eve in 2000."

The book points out that Berman must have known her assailant, because there was no forced entry, no robbery, and nothing missing from her home. At the time of the murder, according to the book and an interview with Durst's attorney, Dick DeGuerin, Durst had traveled to California while awaiting trial in Galveston, Texas, for the murder of an elderly acquaintance. The book includes details about the Durst connection and his planned visit to Berman the week she was killed.*

Also, "Various suspects are evaluated" in the book, according to Online Nevada Encyclopedia.

The book is on display at downtown Las Vegas's The Mob Museum as well as in the Lied Library's Special Collections at the University of Nevada, Las Vegas.

In 2004, Murder of a Mafia Daughter was optioned for film development by TKO Productions.

The book was used as background sourcing, and the author was a consultant, for NBC’s 2010 documentary "Solve My Mystery: The Susan Berman Story."

=== New editions ===
2nd edition

On November 7 and 8, 2015, the author appeared on a FOX News special about Robert Durst to discuss details Scott covered in the book about Berman's relationship with Durst. Following Durst's arrest in 2015 on suspicion of killing Susan Berman, the second edition of Murder of a Mafia Daughter was released the same year to include Durst's arrest and ensuing murder charge.

Once Durst was convicted in September 2021 for the death of Berman and following Durst's own death January 2022, an updated and expanded edition of the book, titled Murder of a Mafia Daughter: Robert Durst and Susan Berman—The Shocking Inside Story was released a month later, in January 2022, 20 years after the release of the first edition.

== Critical reception ==
Original book cover

In February 2003, the book was named “Pick of the Week” by Las Vegas CityLife.

Las Vegas CityLife reporter Meredith McGhan wrote, in a 2003 critique of the book, "(Scott) has added new and current information to the library of Mob-related Las Vegas literature.

Las Vegas Review-Journal columnist John L. Smith, in his review of the book in 2004, wrote that “The Berman described by Scott was a skilled writer and journalist with a penchant for landing the big story. But, overall, the portrait isn't flattering. She was a former rich kid who lived off a trust fund, then sponged off friends when the easy money ran out. She won big jobs, but couldn't keep them.”

In December 2013, Smith included the book as a gift recommendation in his Las Vegas Review-Journal column, titled "Tales about Las Vegas make good stocking stuffers."

in January 2014, True Crime Zine gave the book a five-star review.

== Awards ==

The rereleased title, Murder in Beverly Hills, was named a finalist in ForeWord magazine's 2013 Book of the Year Awards in the true crime category.

In June 2014, ForeWord Reviews winners were announced at the American Library Association's annual conference where Murder in Beverly Hills was given the silver award in best true crime books of the year.
