= Recession of 1937–1938 =

Economic downturn that occurred during the Great Depression in the United States

Unemployment rate in the US 1910–1960, with the years of the Great Depression (1929–1939) highlighted. % U.S. unemployment (estimated) % U.S. unemployment

The recession of 1937–1938 was an economic downturn that occurred during the Great Depression in the United States.

By the spring of 1937, production, profits, and wages had regained their early 1929 levels. Unemployment remained high, but it was substantially lower than the 25% rate seen in 1933. The American economy took a sharp downturn in mid-1937, lasting for 13 months through most of 1938. Industrial production declined almost 30 percent, and production of durable goods fell even faster.

Unemployment jumped from 14.3% in May 1937 to 19.0% in June 1938. Manufacturing output fell by 37% from the 1937 peak and was back to 1934 levels. Producers reduced their expenditures on durable goods, and inventories declined, but personal income was only 15% lower than it had been at the peak in 1937. In most sectors, hourly earnings continued to rise throughout the recession, partly compensating for the reduction in the number of hours worked. As unemployment rose, consumer expenditures declined, leading to further cutbacks in production.

== Recession of 1937 and recovery ==
Manufacturing employment in the United States from 1920 to 1940.

The Roosevelt administration was under assault during Roosevelt's second term, which presided over a new dip in the Great Depression in the fall of 1937 that continued through most of 1938. Production and profits declined sharply. Unemployment jumped from 14.3% in 1937 to 19.0% in 1938. The downturn was perhaps due to nothing more than the usual rhythms of the business cycle, but up until 1937, Roosevelt had claimed responsibility for the US's excellent economic performance. That backfired in the recession and the heated political atmosphere of 1937.

Business-oriented conservatives explained the recession by arguing that the New Deal had been very hostile to business expansion in 1935–1937, had threatened massive antitrust legal attacks on big corporations and by the huge strikes caused by the organizing activities of the CIO (Congress of Industrial Organizations) and the AFL (American Federation of Labor). The recovery was explained by the conservatives in terms of the diminishing of those threats sharply after 1938. For example, the antitrust efforts fizzled out without major cases. The CIO and AFL unions started battling each other more than corporations, and tax policy became more favorable to long-term growth.

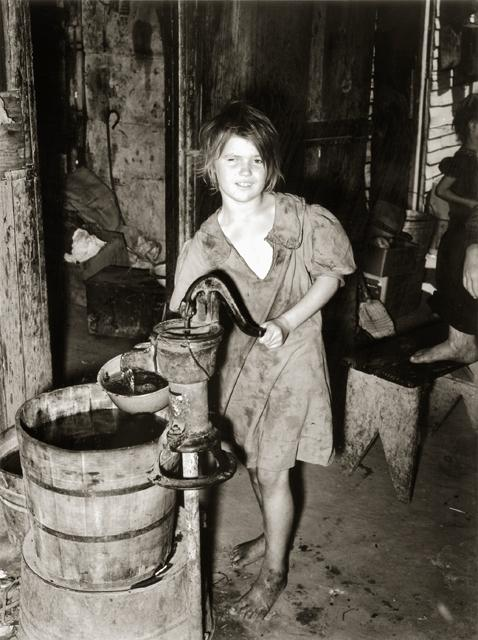
Scene in an agricultural worker's shack town, Oklahoma City, July 1939

"When The Gallup Organization's poll in 1939 asked, 'Do you think the attitude of the Roosevelt administration toward business is delaying business recovery?' the American people responded 'yes' by a margin of more than two-to-one. The business community felt even more strongly so." Fortune's Roper poll found in May 1939 that 39% of Americans thought the administration had been delaying recovery by undermining business confidence, while 37% thought it had not. But it also found that opinions on the issue were highly polarized by economic status and occupation. In addition, AIPO found in the same time that 57% believed that business attitudes toward the administration were delaying recovery, while 26% thought they were not, emphasizing that fairly subtle differences in wording can evoke substantially different polling responses.

Keynesian economists stated that the recession of 1937 was a result of a premature effort to curb government spending and balance the budget. Roosevelt had been cautious not to run large deficits. In 1937 he actually achieved a balanced budget. Therefore, he did not fully utilize deficit spending. Between 1933 and 1941 the average federal budget deficit was 3% per year.

In November 1937 Roosevelt decided that big businesses were trying to ruin the New Deal by causing another depression that voters would react against by voting Republican. It was a "capital strike" said Roosevelt, and he ordered the Federal Bureau of Investigation to look for a criminal conspiracy (they found none). Roosevelt moved left and unleashed a rhetorical campaign against monopoly power, which was cast as the cause of the new crisis. United States secretary of the interior Harold L. Ickes attacked automaker Henry Ford, steelmaker Tom Girdler, and the super rich "Sixty Families" who supposedly comprised "the living center of the modern industrial oligarchy which dominates the United States".

Left unchecked, Ickes warned, they would create "big-business Fascist America—an enslaved America". The president appointed Robert Jackson as the aggressive new director of the antitrust division of the Justice Department, but this effort lost its effectiveness once World War II began and big business was urgently needed to produce war supplies. But the Administration's other response to the 1937 dip that stalled recovery from the Great Depression had more tangible results.

Ignoring the requests of the Treasury Department and responding to the urgings of the converts to Keynesian economics and others in his Administration, Roosevelt embarked on an antidote to the depression, reluctantly abandoning his efforts to balance the budget and launching a $5 billion spending program in the spring of 1938, an effort to increase mass purchasing power. Roosevelt explained his program in a fireside chat in which he told the American people that it was up to the government to "create an economic upturn" by making "additions to the purchasing power of the nation".

== Rhetorical response ==
The Roosevelt Administration reacted by launching a rhetorical campaign against monopoly power, which was cast as the cause of the depression, and appointing Thurman Arnold in the antitrust division of the U.S. Department of Justice to act, but Arnold was not effective. In February 1938, Congress passed a new AAA bill, the Agricultural Adjustment Act of 1938, which authorized crop loans, crop insurance against natural disasters, and large subsidies to farmers who cut back production. On April 2, Roosevelt sent a new large-scale spending program to Congress and received $3.75 billion, which was split among Public Works Administration (PWA), Works Progress Administration (WPA), and various relief agencies. Other appropriations raised the total to $5 billion in the spring of 1938, after which the economy recovered.

== Recovery ==
Although the American economy began to recover in mid-1938, employment did not regain the early 1937 level until the United States entered World War II in late 1941. Personal income in 1939 was almost at 1919 levels in aggregate, but not per capita. The farm population had fallen 5%, but farm output was up 19% in 1939.

Employment in private sector factories regained the levels reached in early 1929 and early 1937, but did not exceed them until the onset of World War II. Productivity steadily increased, and output in 1942 was well above the levels of both 1929 and 1937.

== Interpretations ==
The recession was caused by contractionary fiscal and monetary policies which worked to reduce aggregate demand. Cuts in federal spending and increases in taxes at the insistence of the US Treasury caused many Americans to lose their jobs, with knock-on effects on the broader economy. Historian Robert C. Goldston also noted that two vital New Deal job programs, the Public Works Administration and Works Progress Administration, experienced drastic cuts in the budget which Roosevelt signed into law for the 1937–1938 fiscal year. In addition, the Federal Reserve's tightening of the money supply in 1936 and 1937 caused an increase in interest rates, which discouraged investment in business. Mainstream economists differ in the relative importance they assign to each of these factors: Monetarists and their successors have tended to emphasize monetary factors and the downsides of regulating the economy via fiscal policy, while Keynesian economists assign similar weight to both monetary and fiscal considerations. New Keynesian models tend to emphasize situations (such as the zero lower bound) where monetary policy arguably loses its effectiveness.

== See also ==
- Great Depression
