= Bent Corydon =

American author and journalist

Bent Georg Corydon (born June 11, 1942) is an American author and journalist. Corydon is the author of the biography L. Ron Hubbard, Messiah or Madman? first published in 1987. Corydon also restored and runs the YMCA Building, a historic building in Riverside, California.

== Early life ==
Corydon was born in Copenhagen, Denmark, to Ellen Rousing and Christian Thomsen Corydon. The family lived in Århus, Denmark, before moving to New Zealand. Corydon attended the Ellerslie School and Penrose High School, now known as One Tree Hill College, where he studied English literature, the French language, and Arts. Corydon's early authorship began in New Zealand. He started work at the South Auckland Courier at 20 as a photojournalist. He worked there for three years. His work there included covering the formation of the city of Māngere.

== Scientology and the YMCA Building ==
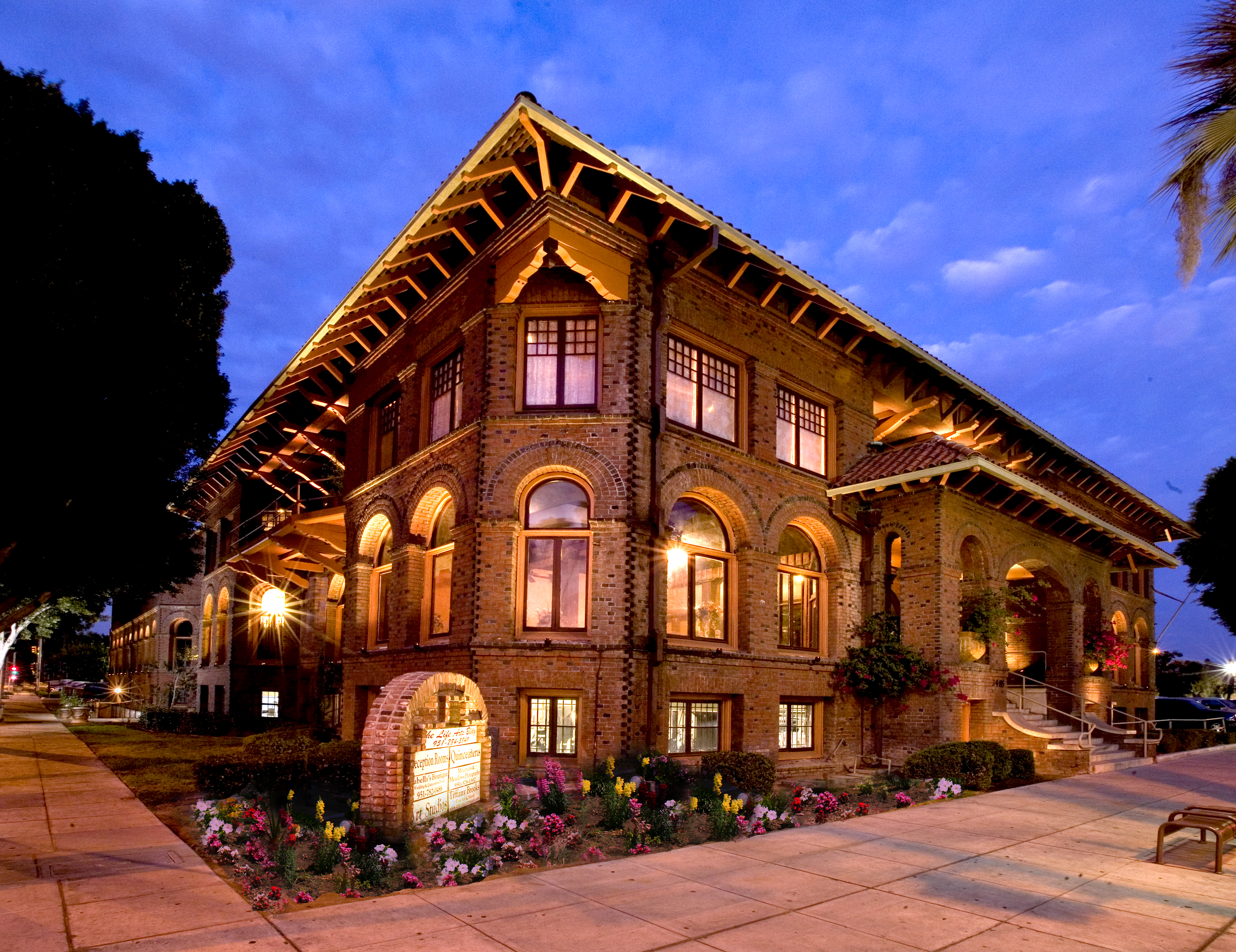
Life Arts building in 2009

Corydon purchased the Riverside California YMCA building in 1974 to be used as a Church of Scientology franchise. The building became the single largest mission of the Church.

Following raids on the greater organization by the FBI in 1977, and reorganization to consolidate missions under Scientology Missions International in 1982, Corydon continued running the site as an independent Scientology group for several years before becoming disillusioned with the practice. Corydon fought a ten-year legal battle with the church over ownership of the building, which he won in 1992.

The YMCA Building has been extensively remodeled by Corydon, and is owned by the Life Arts Center, a California for-profit corporation, with Corydon as president. The facilities include halls available for rent, artists' studios, a gym, and a museum.

== Biography of L. Ron Hubbard ==
Corydon's biography of L. Ron Hubbard in collaboration with Hubbard's son, Ronald DeWolf (L. Ron Hubbard Jr.), was first published in 1987. The book, L. Ron Hubbard, Messiah or Madman?, contradicted many claims made by the Church of Scientology, and the book's publisher, Lyle Stuart, was sued for copyright violation to prevent its release. During this time Corydon was interviewed on several news programs to promote the book, including CBS and CNN. DeWolf also sued the publisher to prevent the publication of the book, claiming the book misrepresented his statements and the publisher had failed to pay him under its agreement. A revised edition was printed in 1992 and 1995 by Stuart's company Barricade Books without crediting DeWolf's authorship.

== See also ==
- L. Ron Hubbard, Messiah or Madman?
- Bibliography of books critical of Scientology
