= Kid Cann =

American gangster (1900–1981)

Isadore Blumenfeld
- Blumenfeld circa 1933
- Born: September 8, 1900; Râmnicu Sărat, Romania
- Died: June 21, 1981 (aged 80); Minneapolis, Minnesota, United States
- Other names: Kid Cann, Dr. Ferguson
- Occupation: Mobster
- Status: Deceased

Isadore Blumenfeld (September 8, 1900 – June 21, 1981), commonly known as Kid Cann, was a Romanian-born Jewish-American organized crime enforcer based in Minneapolis, Minnesota, for over four decades. He remains the most notorious mobster in the history of Minnesota. He was associated with several high-profile crimes in the city's history. He was tried and acquitted for the 1924 murder of cab driver Charles Goldberg. Blumenfeld was also present at the scene of the attempted murder by Verne Miller of Minneapolis Police Department officer James H. Trepanier. Blumenfeld was also tried and acquitted for personally firing the murder weapon, a Thompson submachine gun, in the globally infamous December 1935 contract killing of Twin Cities investigative journalist Walter Liggett. He was also unsuccessfully prosecuted in Federal Court for both conspiracy and racketeering in the mobbed up hostile takeover and dismantling of the Twin City Rapid Transit streetcar system during the early 1950s.

Blumenfeld was convicted of violating the Federal Mann Act in 1959 and of attempted jury tampering in 1961. After a short prison term, Blumenfeld retired to Miami Beach, Florida, where he and Meyer Lansky operated a real estate empire. He remained involved in organized crime until his death and left behind an estimated $10 million fortune.

== Life ==
=== Early life ===
Blumenfeld was born in 1900 in the Romanian shtetl of Râmnicu Sărat, Buzău County, to an Orthodox Jewish family. According to U.S. Immigration and Naturalization Service documents, his parents emigrated to America in 1902 via the port of Duluth, Minnesota. His father, a Romanian Jewish furrier named Phillip Blumenfeld, settled his wife Eva Blumenfeld (née Abromowitz) at 824 S. Seventh Street Minneapolis. During childhood, Isadore had to leave school and support his family by selling newspapers on Minneapolis' "Newspaper Row." At the time, the best selling locations had to be held by force against gangs of other boys. Blumenfeld would also tell stories of how he had made extra money picking up bus tokens and reselling them. Enraged by the poverty of his family, he turned to running errands for the pimps and madams of Minneapolis's red light district.

Two tales are told of the origins of his famous nickname. According to one legend, he picked up the name during a brief attempt at boxing. Another story told by his fellow North Side Jews alleges that young Isadore Blumenfeld would always lock himself in the outhouse (that is, the "can") to avoid gang fights in the neighborhood. Kid Cann indignantly denied both versions. Journalist Neal Karlen confirms that both stories were false, "Kid enjoyed not only fighting, but killing."

=== Prohibition ===
With the onset of Prohibition, Kid Cann and his brothers Harry Bloom and Jacob Blumenfeld (alias "Dandy" and "Yiddy Bloom"), were transformed from small-time hoods into major organized crime figures in association with the American Mafia.

By his 20s, Blumenfeld and his brothers held considerable power over criminal activities in Minneapolis and oversaw bootlegging, illegal gambling, prostitution, extortion, and labor racketeering. Neal Karlen has described their organization as, "led by the Kid on machine gun and Harry and Yiddy Bloom on brains."

Their ties to the Chicago Outfit and New York City's Genovese crime family date back to the Prohibition period.

According to a later trial, they would legally import industrial grade alcohol from Samuel Bronfmans distillery in Montreal, which was shipped across the Great Lakes to Duluth, and then driven on souped up Ford automobiles to the La Pompoudor "perfume factory" in the Twin Cities. The brothers also ran illegal distilleries in the forests near Fort Snelling.

According to historian Elaine Davis, Kid Cann and his brothers, like many other organized crime figures from the Twin Cities, Chicago, and Kansas City, made frequent trips to Stearns and Morrison Counties to purchase Minnesota 13; a very high quality moonshine distilled locally by Polish- and German-American farmers with the collusion of local politicians and law enforcement. Davis writes that the main go-between connecting local moonshiners with organized crime was Melrose resident "Chick" Molitor, who lived with his family on a dairy farm near Big Birch Lake. The Blumenfelds, with whom Molitor had a very close business relationship, visited the area so often that they allegedly owned property south of the Rock Tavern in Melrose.

According to Twin Cities crime reporter Paul Maccabee, Kid Cann's rivalry with Minneapolis's Irish Mob ended after he and Irish Mob bosses Big Ed Morgan and Tommy Banks divided the city with a handshake.

A number of deaths are attributed to Blumenfeld and his gang, including journalists who were killed after writing articles exposing the inner workings of his organization as well as his ties to corrupt politicians from several parties. A Jewish restaurant owner who recalls this era once said that the Blumenfelds were worshipped by several generations of neighborhood boys.

There was a high degree of political and civil corruption in the region in the 1920s and 1930s. The mainstream newspapers hardly mentioned what was going on, as any outlet that published articles critical of the status quo was threatened. Some small tabloid newspapers attempted to report what was going on, but reporters and editors quickly became targets. Howard Guilford of the Twin City Reporter was shot and killed on September 6, 1934.

Sports journalist Sid Hartman, who grew up in a poor Russian Jewish family in North Minneapolis, was an eleven year old newspaper peddler when he was brought by Minneapolis Tribune street circulation manager Joseph Katzman into the upper room at Jack Doyle's restaurant on Hennepin Avenue between Fourth and Fifth Streets. At the time, the restaurant was downstairs and upstairs was one of the largest sports betting operations in Minneapolis. Kid Cann, Tommy Banks, and the Berman Brothers were regular visitors and Hartman's decades long friendship with them began during those years.

From their headquarters at The Flame jazz club in Minneapolis' Washington Avenue Gateway District, the AZ Syndicate also committed many other crimes.

According to Hartman, "Kid Cann would bring in Sophie Tucker, Cab Calloway - entertainers like that - to appear at his club. Then, after hours, they would close the doors and the real show would begin. One time, the cops came barging in at 4am, took us all out, and put everyone in the Paddy wagon. If they had booked me with the rest of the people, I probably would have made the newspaper and lost my job at the Tribune. I did some begging and the cops let me go."

On August 23, 1933, a Federal grand jury in Oklahoma City indicted Blumenfeld for money laundering. The $200,000 ransom Machine Gun Kelly had received following the kidnapping of oil man Charles F. Urschel had been traced to Hennepin State Bank in Minneapolis. Blumenfeld was arrested and transported to Oklahoma City to await his trial. Minneapolis Police Chief Joseph Lehmeyer traveled down to Oklahoma City to testify in favor of Kid Cann and the charges were dropped.

In December 1933, the AZ Syndicate's accountant, Conrad Althen, who had become a secret informant for the Internal Revenue Service and whom according to Paul Maccabee "knew where every penny and body was buried", was thrown out of a car into a Dakota County cornfield and shot to death with a Thompson submachine gun.

=== After Prohibition ===
Following the end of Prohibition, Blumenfeld and his family continued to maintain control over the now legal liquor industry and owned, "all the big liquor stores; East Hennepin, Loring Liquors, and Lake Street. They monopolized the liquor business, and that's why they had so many enemies."

According to an internal FBI memo, "It is impossible to operate any place in Minneapolis without first getting permission from the Syndicate, and if a place is operated without obtaining such permission, the Syndicate sees to it that the new place is immediately closed."

=== The Liggett murder ===
The most notorious murder was that of Walter Liggett, one of the founders of the Farmer-Labor Party and the editor of a weekly newspaper called The Midwest American.

As part of what was termed the "Ligget-Townley Revolt" against Farmer Labor Party leader and Minnesota Governor Floyd Olson, Ligget began reporting on links he found between Twin Cities Irish and Jewish organized crime and senior politicians from the Farmer-Labor Party. Beginning on June 29, 1935, every issue of The Midwest American printed ten reasons for impeaching Governor Olson, including political corruption and collusion with organized crime.

Throughout September 1935, Liggett reported on "a wet-councilmanic ring" which allowed "The Syndicate", led by the Blumenfeld brothers, to dominate the newly legalized liquor trade in Minneapolis. During the same month, The Midwest American also published articles about Kid Cann's criminal history and how associate Meyer Schuldberg employed him as a "salesman" for La Pompadour perfume factory during Prohibition, which had switched since repeal to producing Chesapeake Brands Liquors. Liggett also alleged that the Blumenfelds had been so certain that the city council would grant them a license for Lake Street liquors, that they had begun buying advertisements ten days before the council's vote.

After announcing in print that he had refused offers of both bribes and paid advertisements by AZ Syndicate-controlled businesses, Liggett reported on October 2, 1935, that Minneapolis aldermen Henry Banks and Romeo Riley had both attended the prizefight between Joe Louis and Max Baer as personal guests of Kid Cann. Liggett also reported that State Liquor Commissioner David Arundel had also attended the fight as a guest of Farmer-Labor fixer and Syndicate liquor lobbyist Fred Ossanna.

According to Neal Karlen, Kid Cann allegedly claimed to fellow members of Minneapolis' criminal underworld that Liggett was using The Midwest American to try and extort money from him. Blumenfeld allegedly also believed that no journalist would ever dare to report Governor Olson's ties to the AZ Syndicate and was outraged when Liggett did so.

Liggett was beaten up, prosecuted for a non-existent rape incident, and finally died after being machine gunned in the alley behind his home on December 9, 1935. His wife and daughter witnessed the assassination as did several neighbors. All identified Kid Cann as the shooter. Kid Cann was indicted by a grand jury and, on January 29, 1936, his trial began, where he was prosecuted jointly by the Hennepin County Attorney and the State's Attorney's Office.

Meanwhile, Kid Cann's younger half-brother Jacob Blumenfeld, alias "Yiddy Bloom", whom many sources allege to have been the acting boss of the organization, resurfaced in Paris. In an interview with the Washington Times, Jacob Blumenfeld called Liggett's murder, "a terrible extreme, but what the hell. Liggett persecuted the AZ Syndicate, which only wanted to live in peace with him. He was fiercely honest and became ridiculously inconvenient."

Poor investigative work and a careless trial, however, meant that Kid Cann was acquitted. Edith Liggett always believed that Minnesota Governor Floyd Olson and Farmer-Labor Party fixer Charles Ward were responsible for setting up her husband's murder. Liggett had repeatedly accused the Governor in print of having links to organized crime.

=== Other crimes ===
Although indicted for shooting dead taxicab driver Charles Goldberg and arrested for the attempted murder of police officer James H. Trepanier, who was left paralyzed, Blumenfeld continued to avoid conviction for serious crimes.

According to Twin Cities crime historian Paul Maccabee, FBI files reveal that rival Minneapolis Jewish mob boss David Berman contributed very heavily to Marvin L. Kline's mayoral campaign under the understanding that Berman would receive a monopoly over illegal gambling in Minneapolis. Therefore, during Kline's 1941–1945 term as Mayor, Berman briefly eclipsed the Blumenfelds and became the leader of the Minneapolis criminal underworld.

In 1942, FBI documents described Kid Cann as the, "recognized leader of graft and racketeering in Minneapolis". They added that Blumenfeld was, "known to have corrupted City and County officials... and has been known to harbor criminals of various types." The files also report that Kid Cann often boasted that he had the Minneapolis City Council, "in the palm of his hand."

FBI files also allege that Kid Cann was involved with Bugsy Siegel in the running of the El Cortez Hotel and Casino in Las Vegas, Nevada.

The December 1944 issue of the Public Press, edited by Walter Liggett-style anti-corruption crusader Arthur Kasherman, featured the headline Kline Administration Most Corrupt Regime in the History of the City. A month later, on the night of Jan. 22, 1945, Kasherman was ambushed after eating dinner with a friend and shot dead on a sidewalk at 15th and Chicago avenues in Minneapolis. His murder made the front pages of newspapers across the Twin Cities, but few in Minneapolis were surprised when the police investigation was quickly shut down.

Public outrage over Kasherman's murder led, however, to the first term of Hubert Humphrey, who ran for the Minneapolis mayor's office promising to be a racket buster. According to historian Paul Maccabee, however, Humphrey succeeded only in shutting down the far more visible criminal operations of David Berman and leaving those of Tommy Banks and the Blumenfelds largely unscathed. Berman and his associates then moved their operations to Las Vegas, Nevada and left the Blumenfelds to take their place in Minneapolis.

According to journalists Neal Karlen and Bob Patrin, Blumenfeld and his brothers made three verbal requests to Frank Fietek, the owner of the Swing City jazz club at 1682 Rice Street in St. Paul, to either pay protection money to them or hand over control of his club. When Fietek allegedly refused the third time, he was abducted and was dumped with two broken legs on County Road D. When a permanently crippled Fietek still refused to pay, his club was the target of an arson attack in November 1945. In response to Fietek's continued refusal to sell, Kid Cann was allegedly responsible for Fietek's murder by strangulation on March 4, 1946. No one, however, was ever indicted or prosecuted.

As the electric streetcar system, operated by Twin City Rapid Transit, was being dismantled in the early 1950s and replaced with diesel buses, Blumenfeld owned a 16% stake in the company. He was later accused of allying himself with an Italian-American Farmer-Labor Party fixer turned corporate raider named Fred Ossanna, and using force to intimidate stockholders to selling. Then, following the success of their hostile takeover and the company's transfer from streetcars to diesel busses, both Kid Cann and Ossanna received significant kickbacks while disposing of the scrap metal from the streetcars. What remained of Twin City Rapid Transit was taken over at the behest of Governor Orville Freeman by noted Minneapolitan Carl Pohlad in 1960.

In 1954, the Chicago Crime Commission named Kid Cann as involved with the Chicago Outfit in the jukebox racket.

As public interest in organized crime grew over the course of the 1950s, Twin Cities Federal Agents and Prosecutors became increasingly determined to put Blumenfeld and his associates in prison.

During the late 1950s, the Immigration and Naturalization Service added Blumenfeld to the "Denaturalization and Deportation Program". In the hope of deporting Blumenfeld back to the Socialist Republic of Romania for moral turpitude, both the INS and the FBI launched an investigation between 1959 and 1960 of Kid Cann's sexual activities.

According to Blumenfeld's close friend Sid Hartman, however, the Federal Government's pursuit of "The AZ Syndicate" was motivated solely by anti-Semitism. Hartman wrote in his memoirs, "It was OK for the Kennedy family in Boston and for some of the families that are now among the wealthiest in the Twin Cities - families living off trust funds in Wayzata - to have made their money in bootlegging. But it drove a lot of people nuts that the Jews were running Minneapolis and still making money in the liquor business."

=== Convictions and imprisonment ===
In 1959, Kid Cann was indicted on Federal charges for violating the Mann Act by transporting a Chicago prostitute named Marilyn Tollefson across State lines to work for his prostitution ring in the Twin Cities. Although Blumenfeld's defense counsel read "smoky passages" from Tollefson's love letters to Kid Cann to suggest that, "it was not just money that lured her across State lines", in 1960 a Federal court found Blumenfeld guilty and sentenced him to two years imprisonment.

As this conviction was being appealed, a Federal grand jury indicted Kid Cann, Fred Ossanna, and six other executives of the Twin City Rapid Transit Company for mail fraud, wire fraud, and transporting fraudulently obtained property across State lines. All defendants were convicted at trial, except Blumenfeld, who was acquitted of all thirteen charges against him.

In another Federal trial in 1960, the IRS used ownership forms to prove that Blumenfeld, his relatives, and other members of the "AZ Syndicate" continued to control the Minneapolis liquor industry. Blumenfeld offered a $10,000 bribe to one of the jurors, but was caught within hours. When charged with attempted jury tampering, Blumenfeld plead guilty.

In an interview with Paul Maccabee, FBI Special Agent Bill Lais recalled sitting with Blumenfeld as he awaited sentencing, "Isadore lit my cigarette for me, took off my coat for me, called me, 'sir'. He admitted that he'd tried to bribe a juror at his trial. Then he said he wanted to send a nice present to my wife. It was Cann's opening gambit to see if I could be bribed, too!"

In 1961, after being accused during sentencing of ordering rigged dice for use in his Twin Cities illegal gambling operations, of blowing up a business rival's house in Miami Beach, and of receiving a cut of the money skimmed from Las Vegas' Sands Hotel and Casino through a "strawman" named Mr. Isaacs, Kid Cann was sentenced by Federal Judge Edward Devitt to a second two-year sentence for attempted jury tampering.

Kid Cann served four years at USP Leavenworth and was released in 1964, after his wife Lillian paid his $12,500 fine for violating the Mann Act.

=== Later years ===
After his release from prison, Kid Cann moved to Miami Beach, Florida with his brothers. They continued to make money through criminal activities, though they changed tack and focused instead on questionable real estate dealings. In 1967, Miami newspapers alleged that Kid Cann, Meyer Lansky, and their relatives either owned or had financial stakes in ten of Miami's best hotels. Blumenfeld and Lansky were also alleged to have set up a labyrinth of businesses, deeds, mortgages, leases, and subleases to conceal their involvement and evade Federal income taxes.

According to Neal Karlen, Lansky once said of Blumenfeld, "I wouldn't trust that momzer", (bastard), "with my pocket comb." Karlen adds, however, that Lansky loved Blumenfeld's brothers Harry and Yiddy and could refuse them nothing.

Kid Cann frequently visited his family and friends in Minnesota. During an interview with a Minneapolis reporter in 1976, Blumenfeld denounced the Federal Agents and Prosecutors who had put him away as his "persecutors", and called his conviction under the Mann Act, a "trumped up charge", that involved, "a two-dollar whore." Blumenfeld added that he had recently turned down an offer to write his memoirs, saying "I have nothing to say, really."

In 1978, however, Blumenfeld and his brothers were allegedly responsible for manipulating Magic Marker stock prices.

== Personal life ==
Blumenfeld smoked Parliament cigarettes and wore flashy clothes. His favorite outfit included a maroon suit, maroon suede shoes, a canary yellow shirt, and matching socks.

Blumenfeld reportedly hated his famous nickname and preferred to be called Dr. Ferguson, or "Fergie", especially by his many female lovers. He would also oddly enough ask his family to call him, "Fergie" as well.

According to Paul Maccabee, after the death of legendary Twin Cities madam Nina Clifford in July 1929, the AZ Syndicate assigned Blumenfeld's girlfriend, Lillian Lee, to run Clifford's brothel at 147 and 145 South Washington Street in St. Paul. City Directories confirm that Lillian Lee, described as a "saleswoman", ran the brothel between 1931 and 1934.

After several years of living together, Blumenfeld and Lillian Lee were married on August 25, 1936. They had no children and, following her death, Lillian Blumenfeld was buried next to her husband at Adath Yeshurun Cemetery in Edina.

== Death ==
After allegedly returning home to die, Kid Cann died in Minneapolis' Mount Sinai Hospital of heart disease on June 21, 1981. Blumenfeld's death was news from coast to coast.

At the time of his death, Isadore Blumenfeld's estate was conservatively estimated at $10 million. According to an obituary in Time Magazine which incorrectly listed his place of death as New York City, Kid Cann was also a philanthropist and, although Jewish, had donated an estimated 10% of his estimated $10 million fortune to churches as well as to synagogues. When once asked why, Blumenfeld had replied, "I believe in playing all the angles. I'm superstitious."

Rabbi Max Shapiro of Temple Israel, "the leading rabbi at the largest congregation in the city", and "the city's most sought after eulogist", recited the graveside services and the Kaddish in a driving rain before Blumenfeld's burial at the Adath Yeshurun Cemetery in Edina, Minnesota. Taxi driver Charles Goldberg, whom Blumenfeld shot dead in an allegedly accidental shooting during, "an argument over a girl", in front of Minneapolis' Café Vienna in 1924, lies buried only a few yards away.

In an onsite interview with Minneapolis Tribune reporter Bonnie Miller Rubin, mourner Harry Horowitz said of Blumenfeld, "He was a wonderful fellow when a person needed something. He helped out many a person who was broke - who had absolutely nothing. He never forgot his friends and he always kept the family together."

Rabbi Shapiro later recalled,

After Kid Cann's funeral, I received a call from someone who asked how could I possibly officiate at the funeral of such a terrible human being? And I answered, it's my belief that every Jew at death, no matter what he did in life, deserves to have the Mourners Kaddish – the last prayer – said for him. So I said Kaddish for Kid Cann.

== Folklore ==
In Minnesota folklore, tales of Kid Cann and his rumored dark deeds may be considered to have made him a local urban legend, similar to Al Capone or Whitey Bulger.

In later years, he was alleged to have installed bulletproof windows on his suburban house and to have been able to fix any problem with a single phone call. During his lifetime, Kid Cann bore a love–hate relationship with his legend, on one hand glorying in the attention and also feeling infuriated by the increased F.B.I. surveillance that it brought him beginning in the early 1950s. In a 1976 interview, he snapped, "Ninety percent of what was written about me is bullshit!"

== In popular culture ==
- In October 2010, the "Minnesota Landmarks and Lakeshore Players" performed a stage play about Kid Cann's life and trials at Saint Paul's Landmark Center, the historic Ramsey County Courthouse. The play was written and directed by Joan Gill Elwell.

== See also ==
- Near v. Minnesota
