= The Sensuous Man =

- Author: Joan (Terry) Garrity
- Language: English
- Subject: Human sexuality
- Publisher: L. Stuart; W. H. Allen
- Publication date: 1971
- Publication place: United States
- Media type: Print

The Sensuous Man is a book written by an author initially known as "M", later revealed to be Joan (Terry) Garrity, John Garrity, and Len Forman. First published in 1971 by both L. Stuart and W. H. Allen, by Corgi in 1972 and again in 1982 by Dell Publishing, Murphy Books, The Sensuous Man is a detailed instruction manual on male sexuality. The book was written to correspond with a similar book by author "J" titled The Sensuous Woman, published in 1969. "J" stands for "Joan" Garrity.

== See also ==
- The Sensuous Dirty Old Man (1971), by pen name "Dr. A" (Isaac Asimov), a mild spoof
