= Marynia F. Farnham =

American psychiatrist and author

Marynia F. Farnham (1899 – May 29, 1979) was an American psychiatrist and author. She is best known for her 1947 work Modern Woman: The Lost Sex (with Ferdinand Lundberg), which contributed to the midcentury anti-feminist movement.

== Early life and education ==
In 1899, Marynia F. Farnham was born Marynia Foot in Red Wing, Minnesota.

As an undergraduate, she studied at Bryn Mawr College, where she graduated in 1921. She obtained a medical degree from the University of Minnesota Medical School, then pursued further studies in psychiatry at Harvard, in London, and in Vienna before settling in New York City.

== Career ==
In New York, Farnham worked as a pediatrician until 1935, after which she began practicing psychiatry. Beginning in 1939, she worked for the children's service of the New York State Psychiatric Institute. She later worked as a psychiatrist at the Presbyterian Hospital. Early in her career, Farnham was one of fewer than two dozen female psychiatrists in the country.

She contributed articles to journals and magazines, and she taught psychiatry at the Columbia University College of Physicians and Surgeons. In 1958, she co-founded the Society for Adolescent Psychiatry.

Farnham became a public figure after the publication of her 1947 book Modern Woman: The Lost Sex, written with Ferdinand Lundberg. The controversial anti-feminist best-seller posited that women were harming themselves and American society as a whole in their pursuit of feminism and abandonment of homemaking. Among the remedies to this supposed "deep illness" suggested by Farnham and Lundberg were psychoanalysis, public education in traditional roles for women, and taxes on unmarried men. Farnham became the public face of the book, flying around the country to promote it through lectures and television appearances, despite the inherent contradictions between her own professional success and the traditional path she advocated for in Modern Women. Betty Friedan sought to refute Farnham's thesis in her seminal 1963 The Feminine Mystique.

As a psychiatrist, Farnham came to specialize in pediatric psychiatry, and her subsequent book, The Adolescent (1951), was intended for parents to understand their children in the modern era.

== Later life ==
Farnham retired from her full-time academic work in 1965, and she ceased practicing in 1968.

She died in 1979 at age 79.
