= Capital strike =

Businesses withholding investments as leverage for getting favorable policy

Capital strike is the practice of businesses withholding any form of new investment in an economy, in order to attain some form of favorable policy. Capital strikes may arise from the determination that return on investment may be low or nonexistent or from the belief that by withholding investment certain political or economic changes may be achieved—or from a combination of the two. Capital strikes can be economy-wide, or take place in a specific industry.

Capital strikes may sometimes result when governments pursue policies that investors consider "unfriendly" or "inflexible", such as rent control or nationalization. Capital strikes are often aimed at undermining proposed left-wing or socialist policies. The term can refer to a capital strike by a single investor or a large group. Capital strikes are commonly invoked as the business-owner/shareholder equivalent of a labor strike, and are often tied to the concept of capital flight. Capital strike was originally a derogatory term, but has been used more neutrally in modern politics.

== Examples ==
It is difficult to determine with any certainty when a decline in business investment is the result of a "capital strike" against certain policies or a response to other economic factors. Most often, the phrase "capital strike" is used to describe resistance to labor-friendly or left wing reforms which are perceived or intended to be against the interests of business owners and investors.

- U.S. President Franklin Roosevelt argued that the Recession of 1937 was caused by a capital strike organized to undermine the New Deal and his new taxes on high incomes.
- In December 1978, banks financing the debt of the city of Cleveland, Ohio engaged in a capital strike by refusing to roll over the city's municipal debt when the Mayor, Dennis Kucinich, refused to sell the publicly owned electric company, the Cleveland Municipal Light Plant. Cleveland would later enter default.
- French President François Mitterrand is said to have faced a capital strike when capital fled France following the 1982 nationalization of a large number of private firms and other labor market reforms.
- Chilean President Salvador Allende is said to have faced a capital strike when investment fell after his election as he was the leader of a left-wing coalition that proposed large-scale nationalizations and far-reaching economic reforms.
- U.S. President Barack Obama was sometimes said to have faced a capital strike during the Great Recession, including then Speaker of the House John Boehner saying that "job creators in America are on strike" in response to uncertainty over the Obama administration's economic policies.
- A February 2021 article in the magazine Jacobin argued that companies such as Amazon, Kroger, Lyft, and Uber were threatening to use capital strikes during the COVID-19 pandemic. As examples, they pointed out Uber and Lyft threatening to cease operations in California if California Assembly Bill 5 were enforced and Kroger announcing they would close two stores in Long Beach, California after the city council passed an ordinance requiring grocery stores to increase pay for their workers during the pandemic.

== Impacts ==
Capital strikes have historically impacted economies and governments in a variety of ways and provoked a variety of responses.

- The Roosevelt administration took an aggressive stance in response to the recession and alleged capital strike. Roosevelt railed publicly against monopoly business interests, and signed into law a total of $3.75 billion worth of new congressionally allocated government spending to be divided among government recovery agencies, which helped spur economic rehabilitation.
- Disinvestment and international market pressures forced the Mitterrand government to reverse course on economic policy, making significant cuts to public spending, raising individual taxes, and setting a hard ceiling on deficit spending.
- While the capital strike, often manifested through the intentional under-production of necessity goods, damaged Salvador Allende's government, it maintained significant popular support among working class Chileans until it was overthrown in a 1973 U.S. supported coup that put in place a more business-friendly military junta led by General Augusto Pinochet.
- Under pressure from large firms withholding investment, the Obama administration pursued several pro-business reconciliation initiatives such as cutting corporate tax rates, pursuing free trade deals, and limiting government regulation, but still signed into law mild financial regulations, the Affordable Care Act, and the 2009 American Recovery and Reinvestment Act.

== Conditions under which capital strikes are effective ==
Given that capital strikes have succeeded or failed in a variety of situations, predicting what conditions favor them is particularly difficult. Some have put forward that capital controls are one key method by which governments can mitigate the effectiveness of disinvestment and capital flight, but their usefulness has been disputed. The effectiveness of modern purported capital strikes in Greece and Venezuela have been attributed to the sheer size and reach of the financial firms involved.

== In popular culture ==
A capital strike is the premise of Ayn Rand's novel Atlas Shrugged.

== See also ==
- Capital flight
- Disinvestment
- Lockout (industry)
- Strike action
