= Arthur Kasherman =

American journalist

- Born: ca. 1900
- Died: January 22, 1945; Minneapolis, Minnesota
- Occupation: Publisher
- Known for: Publishing alternative newspapers in Minneapolis, exposing corruption and gangster rule

Arthur Kasherman (ca. 1900 – January 22, 1945) was a publisher of the Public Press, Newsgram and other alternative newspapers in Minneapolis, Minnesota in the 1930s and 1940s. He saw himself as a "vice crusader" publishing fearless exposés about corruption and gangster rule in the city, while others derided him as a blackmailer who threatened to write defamatory articles about people if they didn’t pay him off. He was the third of three newspapermen murdered in Minneapolis between 1934 and 1945. No one was ever punished in Kasherman's death, but the brazen killing came during the mayoral election season and helped elect Hubert Humphrey on a clean-up-the-city platform.

== Early life ==
Kasherman was born in Russia and immigrated to the United States when he was about 10 years old. He grew up in the heavily Jewish enclave of north Minneapolis and graduated from North High School. He wanted to be a lawyer and attended the Minnesota College of Law. But his legal career was derailed when he got caught up in a corruption investigation in City Hall. He was jailed for contempt of court when he refused to name his confidential sources about a gangster’s payoff of the Minneapolis police chief. His reason: he was a “newspaperman.”

From then on, Kasherman fancied himself a crusader against the criminal activities controlled by Twin Cities' Jewish-American organized crime with the collusion of corrupt policemen and politicians. Kasherman ran a long-shot campaign for mayor in 1931, but he devoted most of his efforts to the gritty, blog-like world of the scandal sheet and alternative press.

== Tangles with authority ==
Kasherman worked for a time with Howard Guilford, the muckraking, often scurrilous and bigoted publisher of the Saturday Press and the Twin City Reporter. Like Guilford, Kasherman found himself on the receiving end of the city’s censorship efforts when authorities confiscated his newspaper twice in 1931. Kasherman was also hit over the head with an iron pipe. As if Kasherman needed more evidence of the dangers of practicing his kind of journalism, his old mentor, Guilford, was murdered in a drive-by shooting in 1934. The next year, another publisher who had written about ties between gangsters and government, Walter Liggett of the Midwest American, was slain in an alley in front of his family. In 1936, Kasherman was arrested in a sting operation in which a brothel operator accused him of shaking her down for $25 per month on threats he would write her up in his paper. The following year, Kasherman was sentenced to prison in a clear effort to silence him. He served time in Stillwater until 1940.

== His final years ==
Kasherman quickly resumed publishing the Public Press, and set his sights on Mayor Marvin L. Kline, a Republican, whom he accused of allowing gangsters to run rampant. The December 1944 issue of the “Public Press” featured the headline “Kline Administration Most Corrupt Regime in the History of the City.” A month later, on the night of Jan. 22, 1945, Kasherman was ambushed after eating dinner with a friend and shot dead on a sidewalk at 15th and Chicago avenues in Minneapolis. His death made the front pages of newspapers across the Twin Cities, but few in the city were surprised when the police investigation quickly petered out. Still, the killing was a timely boost to the would-be mayor Hubert Humphrey, who capitalized on Kasherman’s death with the help of campaign staffers with inside knowledge of the investigation and the ability to plant newspaper stories about it that damaged Kline. Humphrey was elected with an overwhelming margin and has been credited with reducing corruption and gangsterism in Minneapolis during his three years in office. Kasherman’s murder was never solved, but he perhaps received some posthumous vindication in Humphrey’s choice as police chief, Ed Ryan, a police officer who was a friend of Kasherman. Kasherman was buried next to his father in United Hebrew Brotherhood Cemetery, Richfield, Minnesota. The Minneapolis police still have an open homicide file for Arthur Kasherman that is available to the public in Room 31 in City Hall.

== See also ==
- List of journalists killed in the United States
- Censorship in the United States
