= Modern Woman: The Lost Sex =

1947 book by Ferdinand Lundberg and Marynia F. Farnham

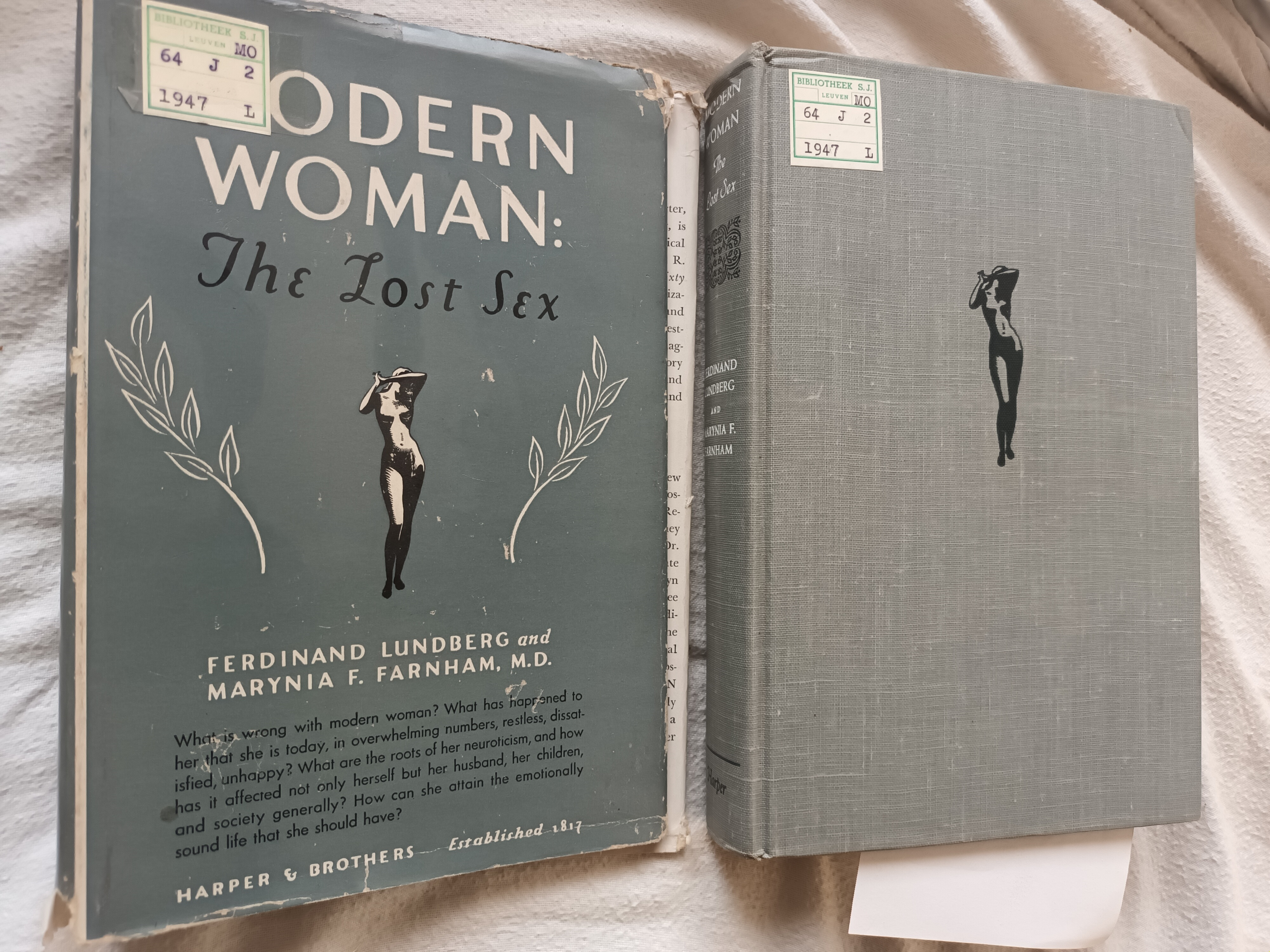
- First edition, with dust cover
- Author: Ferdinand Lundberg; Marynia F. Farnham
- Language: English
- Genre: Non-fiction
- Publication date: 1947

Modern Woman: The Lost Sex is a 1947 work of scientific literature written by Ferdinand Lundberg and Marynia F. Farnham, M.D. which discusses the sociological and psychological context of American women in the post World War II era.

Lundberg, a sociologist and social historian, and Farnham, a psychiatrist affiliated with the New York State Psychiatric Institute and Hospital, argue that "contemporary women in very large numbers are psychologically disordered and that their disorder is having terrible social and personal effects involving men in all departments of their lives as well as women." This book became a national bestseller and contributed to both the return to domesticity in the post-WWII decades and the psychoanalytic antifeminist movement.

== Historical context ==
Lundberg and Farnham wrote Modern Woman: The Lost Sex in the years following World War II, as American society was attempting to return to normalcy. One of the most significant social changes during World War II had been the involvement of American women in the war efforts, both abroad and on the homefront. Over 350,000 women served in some branch of the military, while massive numbers of women left the home to fill in the industrial labor needs left vacant by drafted soldiers. By 1945, almost 37% of American women were employed in the public workforce, with almost one of every four wives working as more than a housewife and mother.

As men returned to the labor force after WWII ended, many women were hesitant to leave their newfound strength and independence realized outside of the home. This created a conservative cultural backlash whose proponents encouraged women to return to the home and to more traditional, domestic gender roles so men could reassume the role of financial provider and family protector. The late 1940s and 1950s were thus characterized by "domesticity, religiosity, respectability, [and] security through compliance within the system," that catalyzed the social movement of women back into the household.

Thus, Lundberg and Farnham's study of female psychology sought to provide a scientific basis to encourage American to reclaim household domesticity and restore the pre-war social order.

== Central arguments ==
=== Concerning Happiness & Neurosis ===
"The bases for most of this unhappiness, as we have shown, are laid in the childhood home. The principal instrument of their creation are women."

Lundberg and Farnham frame their argument during a period of rampant unhappiness and rising neurosis. This neurosis is not merely affecting draft-age men returning from World War II, but the majority of the American population. According to the authors, between one-quarter to one-third of all people are neurotic, while an additional one-quarter to one-third "have some neurotic character traits or some physiological weakness of ailment psychics in origin."

The book points to many social and cultural phenomena facing 1940s America - including social revolutions, Marxism and other forms of socialism, feminism, divorce, declining birth rates, rising crime rates, and alcoholism - as results of the widespread unhappiness and neuroses of the population. Thus, Lundberg and Farnham begin by providing their psycho-historical view of how these problems came to be.

=== Concerning Man's Dilemma ===
"And women, as we have said, have a great deal to do with the condition in general, although they have enjoyed the full co-operation of men in bringing it about."

Man's psychosocial conflict spans back to the Copernican revolution. When the sun was proven the center of the universe, rather than earth and man, male self-esteem was wounded and continually degraded with each following scientific innovation, including Darwinian theory and industrialization. Thus, men must acquire more wealth, knowledge, and social prestige to remain important.

Ultimately, the male's need to prove himself results in improved science and technology such as the steam engine, which undermines the woman's role in the house, rendering her irrelevant in her own home. Women are then forced into the public sphere to find importance and self-fulfillment, which is Lundberg and Farnham's central cause of female neurosis.

=== Concerning Woman's Dilemma ===
"With the loss of the self-contained traditional home, women's inner balance was disastrously upset."

Lundberg and Farnham conclude that once women are forced out of the home by male aggression and advancing technology, women are emotionally and psychologically susceptible to neurosis. Once women leave the home, they lose their sense of emotional security, their ability to readjust to changing environments, and their ownership of femininity and sexuality. This confusion and instability is magnified by the "irreconcilable" demands of industrial society - capitalism, Communism, Fascism, democracy, and other political forces expect different reactions from women and become "both cause and effect...of widespread modern unhappiness."

More specifically, Modern Woman: The Lost Sex focuses on the effect of unhappiness and neurosis on female sexuality, approaches to motherhood and childbearing, and the development of modern feminism.

==== Sexuality ====
"But the entire sex life of women became disorganized, which the social devaluation of children and the difficulties imposed with their reading under the new conditions."

Lundberg and Farnham present sexuality as a dichotomy between men and women: dominant versus submissive, specifically as men actively penetrate, pleasure, and impregnate while women passively accept what is given. They argue the expectation of female frigidity in the 19th century contributes to sensual frustration among women, particularly because women play no role in their own sexual gratification. This places more social pressure on men to pleasure women, but more natural pressure always resides on women to bear and rear children.

Modern Woman also argues the interconnectedness between sexuality and childbirth, citing Freud's theory that continual sexual frustration directly causes neurosis. When women do not desire to have children to emanate male self-confidence, women will not enjoy sex and experience more neurosis. Furthermore, more educated women experience less sexual pleasure and stability, thus decreasing the chance of childbirth.

Lundberg and Farnham make other further notable conclusions on the sexual conditions of women in society. For example, they argue the "rape of the wedding night" phenomena is merely overdramatized due to male sexual enthusiasm, alcohol use, and even female fantasies of being raped. The book also postulates that women who have pre- or extra-marital sex and have a child are highly psychologically unstable and neurotic. Finally, the authors cite female avoidance of childbirth as a dangerous, extremely painful, and threatening experience as a dramatization and result of psychological confusion.

===== Freud =====
Lundberg and Farnham's use of Freudian theory throughout this work is notable. The authors cite Freud and his postulations numerous times throughout the work, particularly his idea of penis-envy as it applied to feminists. However, they draw a distinction between Freud's obsession with sexuality as the sole cause of modern neurosis, and instead cite multiple causes of neurosis, including lack of food, water, or home. Thus, while Modern Woman: The Lost Sex draws on many Freudian theories to explain female neurosis, it cannot be considered a purely Freudian example.

==== Motherhood & Children ====
"Women today have many psychological problems, but the deepest of them is this one having to do with the difficulty of bearing and rearing children under suitable conditions."

Lundberg and Farnham argue that by forcing women out of the home, they either refuse to bear children at all or become flawed mothers that contribute to their children becoming neurotics.

First, 1940s society is not built to accommodate children. Homes and apartments are small and unsuited for children, landlords often select against children, and schools do not adequately keep children engaged. Furthermore, modern women no longer look to childbearing as an honor or source of social prestige. Women have no way to expend energy in a technological home and search for accomplishment equal to that of men - which leaves no room for childbearing and prompts the declining birth rate.

Furthermore, Lundberg and Farnham argue that modern mothers typically fall in one of four categories, all of which are accompanied by psychological danger and negative impact on the children: rejecting mothers, overprotective mothers, dominating disciplinarian mothers, and over-affectionate mothers. Only sometimes can an over-affectionate mother become the righteous mother by applying a moderate amount of affection, loving her children the correct amount, and accept her role as a feminine being. Thus, at the core of all neurosis and unhappiness is a psychologically disturbed mother who neglects her motherly duty in some way and plants additional neuroses in the developing generation.

==== Feminism ====
"Feminism, despite the external validity of its political program and most (not all) of its social program, was at its core, a deep illness."

Modern Woman: The Lost Sex portrays the feminist movement not as a response to centuries-long subjugation of women, but rather as a misguided attempt to remedy the female population's lack of clear purpose after the Industrial Revolution forced them and their economic productivity out of the home. The authors argue that while feminism claims to address the social and political equality of women, it truly targets the sexual and social frustrations of women in an aggressive, unfeminine, and ultimately failed strategy.

Farnham and Lundberg use Freudian psychological arguments to dispel feminist ideology in every topic, including suffrage, divorce, childbearing, equal pay, property rights, sexual freedom, and motherhood. They assert that most feminists suffer from penis envy; thus feminism's impossible psychological goal was to make women not merely equal to men, but equivalent. Finally, Modern Woman labels all feminist thinkers as chronically neurotic and psychologically disturbed, using prominent feminist Mary Wollstonecraft as a case study in disproving all feminist tenets. Describing Wollstonecraft as "an extreme neurotic of a compulsive type," the authors characterize her book A Vindication of the Rights of Woman as a personal screed born from resentment of her alcoholic, abusive father and her sublimated desire to find romantic love, later demonstrated in her torrid affair with an American paramour, Gilbert Imlay.

== Critical reception ==
Modern Woman: The Lost Sex produced a varied yet lasting impact on sociological, psychological, and anthropological scholars. Initial reviews of Lundberg and Farnham's work were mixed. Concerns included a lack of sufficient psychological and sociological data to justify the authors' large claims, the authors' failure to examine sex roles from an anthropological standpoint, and confusion and conflicting arguments at different points in the book. A larger, repeated concern by reviews was the authors' treatment of feminism. Critique included the "confusion of analysis of the neurotic motivations of feminists with scientific examination of their program." Margaret Mead, a leading anthropologist of the age, commented that "sixty pages devoted to a savage attack on the feminist movement" was unwarranted and confusing as it painted women both as the victims of a century-old movement and the criminals and cause of unhappiness and neuroses.

Despite concerns of methodology and instances of occasionally conflicting arguments, most intellectuals supported the core arguments of Modern Women: The Lost Sex. The authors were praised for synthesizing several social and scientific views of the decade, reaffirming the sacred importance of women in the household and "bringing and fostering of life," and providing a viable psychological basis for social discontent. Although Mead commented on the lack of data and contradicting arguments, even she agreed with Lundberg and Farnham's idea that society was discontent, disorganized, and disoriented, particularly in the case of modern women. Reviewers largely believed the authors' central arguments concerning women's role in unhappiness and the unwarranted desire to compete with male sex roles.

Modern Woman: The Lost Sex continued to impact intellectual thinking beyond years after initial publication. Throughout the 1950s and even to present day, Lundberg and Farnham's ideas appear as phrases, reprinted chapters, or paraphrased topics in both intellectual literature and popular culture.

=== The Feminine Mystique ===
Perhaps the most notable intellectual response to Modern Women: The Lost Sex came in Betty Friedan's The Feminine Mystique. Friedan first cites the popular culture impact of Lundberg and Farnham's work, specifically that magazines such as Ladies' Home Journal spread the authors' thesis across America. She later discusses Modern Woman's application of Freudian theory and its attack on feminism to refute their claims and advance her own feminist theories. Friedan's direct response to Lundberg and Farnham emphasizes the intellectual and culture power of Modern Woman to require refutation.

== Public response ==
"In any event, the degree of acceptance or rejection of this thesis will probably depend, not so much on its demonstrability, as on the extent to which modern thought, confused over the unfulfilled promises of liberalistic doctrines, is seeking other faiths."

Modern Woman: The Lost Sex quickly became a bestseller upon its publication. Its popularity was due in part to Lundberg and Farnham's ability to see "the tremendous misery and discontent of modern times." The authors call upon the confusion and discontent following World War II and blame female independence and strength for the unhappiness, which thus provided psychological evidence for many American's beliefs concerning the modern woman.

Marketed towards American women, the book gained success as a scientific work of popular culture advertised to "explore the causes of woman's deep frustration, detail its consequences, and suggest a cure." Although Modern Woman was a fusion of scientific knowledge applied to culture, its impact on popular culture was far reaching. Historians Miller and Nowak argue: "One can compare Modern Woman: The Lost Sex to other rallying points of popular culture: to McCarthy...to Sputnik...to the film Rebel Without a Cause and the singer Elvis Presley."

Lundberg and Farnham's work was discussed in many magazines of the 1940s and 50s, and its themes were alluded to and discussed in many more. It became a common work referred to when discussion women's roles in American culture, by both men and women. Women even used Lundberg and Farnham's book as a self-help text in advice columns in large newspapers. One advice columnist consistently referred readers to Modern Woman: The Lost Sex in The Washington Post. The book also appeared on the American Library Association's 'Fifty Notable Books of 1947' list as well as the Society for Science and the Public's 'Books of the Week' list in April 1947.
