= Ferdinand Lundberg =

American journalist

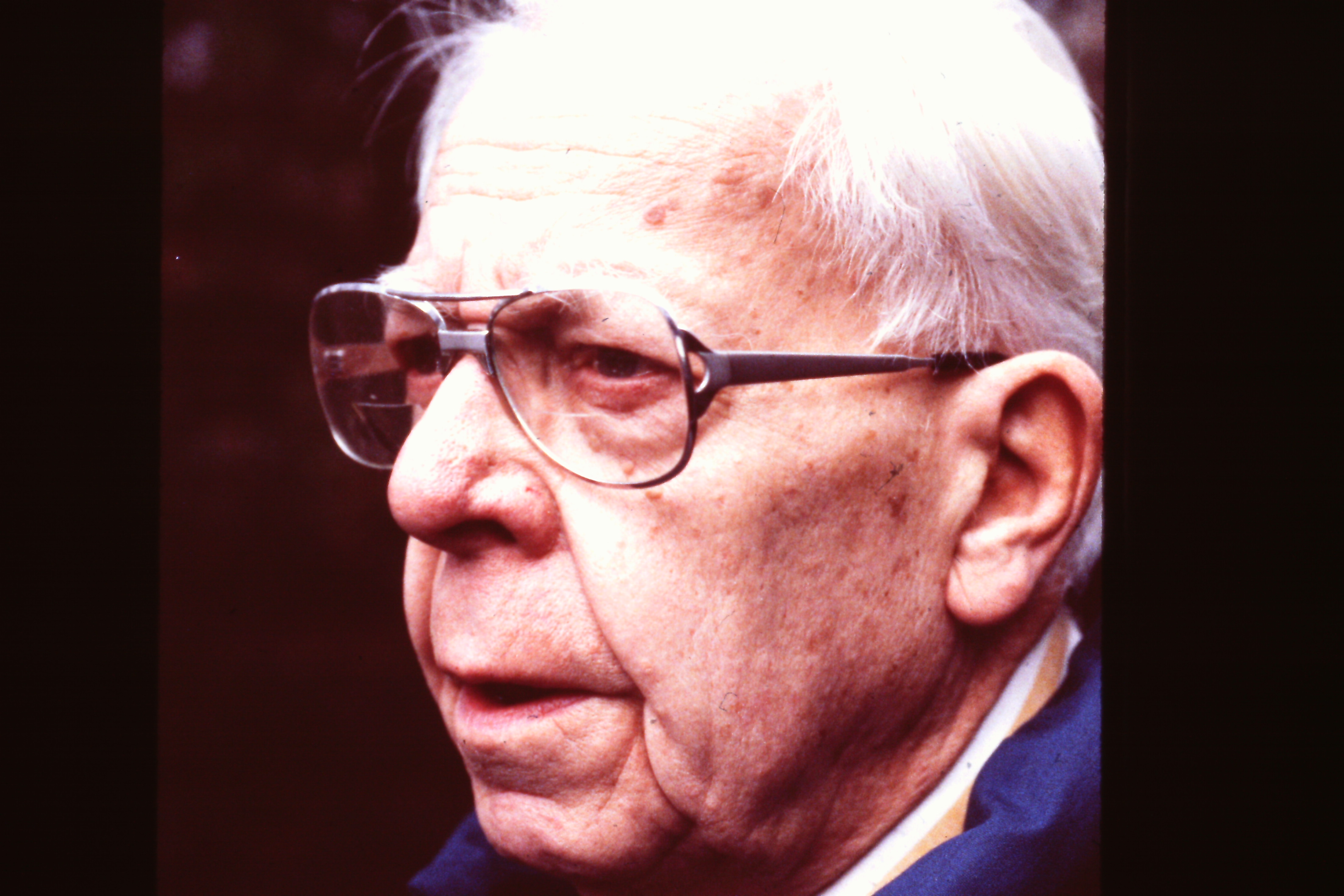
- Born: April 30, 1902; Chicago, Illinois, United States
- Died: January 3, 1995 (aged 92); Mount Kisco, New York, United States
- Education: Columbia University
- Occupations: journalist, author, professor
- Years active: 1924–1994
- Notable work: Imperial Hearst, America's 60 Families, Modern Woman: The Lost Sex, The Myth of Democracy

Ferdinand Lundberg (April 30, 1902 – March 1, 1995) was an American journalist and historian known for his frequent and potent criticism of American financial and political institutions. His work has been credited as an influence on Robert Caro, Ralph Nader and others.

== Early life and education ==
Ferdinand Edgar Lundberg, of Swedish and Norwegian parentage, was born in Chicago, Illinois, and received his B.A. and M.A. degrees from Columbia University.

== Career ==
Early in his career, Lundberg was a business reporter for United Press International, and the Chicago Daily News. From 1927 to 1934 he reported for the New York Herald Tribune.

Described by the Los Angeles Times as "witty, articulate, opinionated, marvelously well-read and not the least bit shy about telling us exactly what he thinks about America and the mess we've made of it", Lundberg was vocal in his contrarian viewpoints, describing the United States as an oligarchy, eviscerating prominent American families including the Rockefellers and Hearsts, and denouncing the United States Constitution while calling for its replacement with a parliamentary system. Several of his dozen-or-so books on these topics were best-sellers. America's 60 Families presents an often scathingly plain-spoken account of American financial and political history through the first third of the 20th century. The Rich and the Super-Rich documents and examines the extreme concentration of wealth in America that places above half of all assets, and overwhelming control, in the possession of 2.5% of the population, largely by inheritance.

Lundberg's debut book, Imperial Hearst, was lauded by Foreign Affairs as "an annihilating study of the newspaper magnate" worthy of "wide attention" while, in modern times, Robert Caro and Ralph Nader have both cited Lundberg's America's 60 Families as early influences on themselves. Betty Friedan, meanwhile, wrote The Feminine Mystique as a rebuttal to Lundberg's and Marynia F. Farnham's book, Modern Woman: The Lost Sex, taking its title from a phrase used by Lundberg in his book. According to the music critic Robert Christgau, the O'Jays' song "Rich Get Richer" (from the 1975 album Survival) was based on Lundberg's writing.

In addition to his journalistic writing, Lundberg also spent 16 years as an adjunct professor of social philosophy at New York University. He was also an editor for the Century Foundation.

== Personal life ==
Lundberg was married to Elizabeth Young, with whom he had two sons. At the end of his life he lived in Chappaqua, New York.

== Works ==
- Imperial Hearst: A social biography (1936)
- — (15 March 2007) [1937]. America's 60 Families. Vanguard Press. ISBN 978-1406751468. LCCN 37030388. OCLC 256489013. OL 6360759M – via Internet Archive.
  - See also America's 60 Families.
- Who Controls Industry? (1938)
- Modern Woman: The Lost Sex (1947)
- The Treason of the People (1954)
- The coming world transformation (1963)
- The Rich and the Super-Rich (1968)
- The Rockefeller Syndrome (1968)
- Cracks in the Constitution (1980)
- The Myth of Democracy (1989)
- Politicians and Other Scoundrels (1992)
- The Natural Depravity of Mankind (1994)

== Other sources ==
- Benson, Adolph B.; Hedin, Naboth, eds. (1938). Swedes in America: 1638-1938. Swedish American Tercentenary Association. Yale University Press. ISBN 978-0838303269. LCCN 73098681. OCLC 28498. OL 16755014M – via Internet Archive.
