= Easy Street (book) =

Memoir of Susan Berman, daughter of mobster David Berman (1981)

- Author: Susan Berman
- Language: English
- Genre: Memoir, crime
- Publisher: Dial Press
- Publication date: January 1, 1981
- Media type: Print
- Pages: 214 pp (Hardback ed)
- ISBN: 978-0385271851
- Followed by: Lady Las Vegas

Easy Street: The True Story of a Mob Family (1981) is the first memoir of Susan Berman, daughter of Las Vegas mobster David Berman. In it, Berman chronicles her mother Gladys's and her own obliviousness to what went on around them. When they finally became aware of their Mafia family, Berman's mother ended up dying in a mental institution and Susan endured a lot of psychotherapy.

Easy Street received critical acclaim and was optioned for a movie, but the film was never made.

Berman wrote a second non-fiction book, part memoir and part history, titled Lady Las Vegas: The Inside Story Behind America's Neon Oasis.

Berman was murdered at her home by her close friend Robert Durst; her body was discovered on December 24, 2000.
