= Terry Garrity =

American author (born 1934)

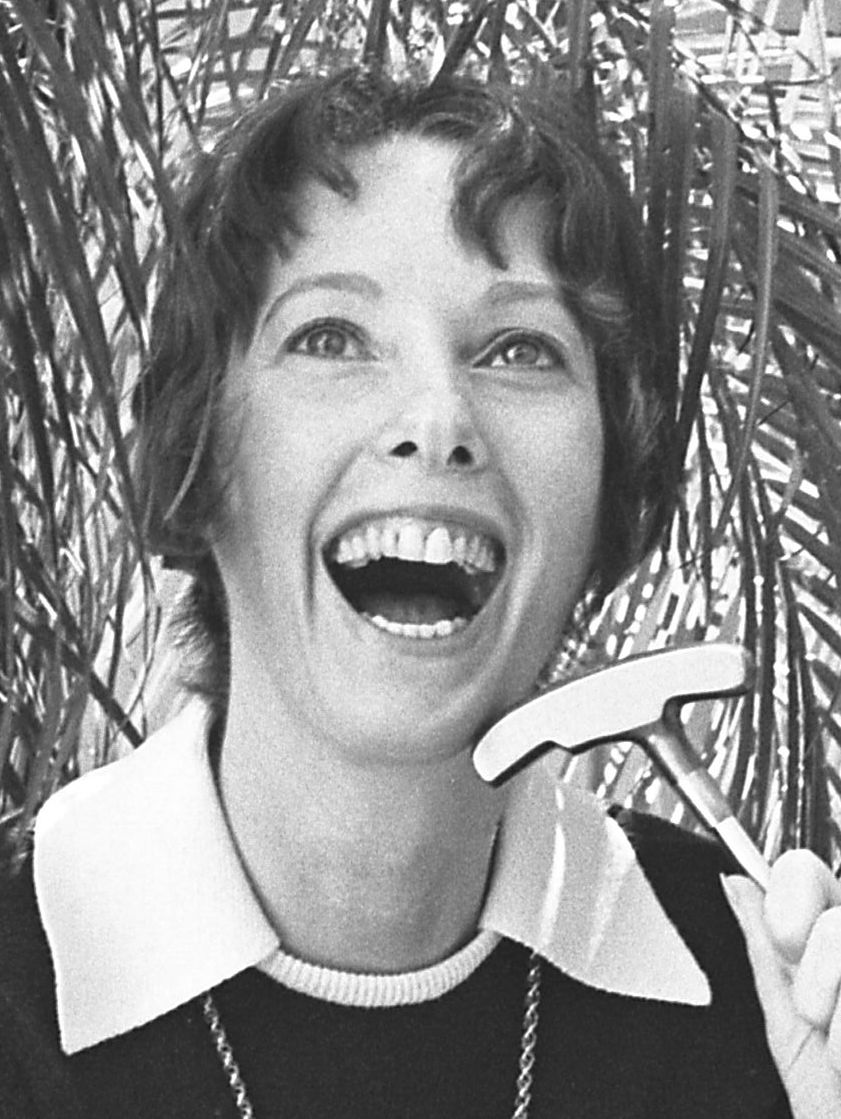
Garrity in 1973.

Joan Theresa Garrity (born January 15, 1934) is an American author, best known as the author of The Sensuous Woman.

== Background and education ==
Garrity was raised in Lee's Summit, Missouri, and studied at Palm Beach Junior College in Florida. She worked on the staff of publisher Lyle Stuart and published a book about shopping in New York.

== Career ==
In 1969 she published, under the pseudonym of "J.", The Sensuous Woman, subtitled "the first how-to book for the female who yearns to be all woman". It was also published as The Way to Become the Sensuous Woman. The book spent eight weeks at No. 1 on the New York Times bestseller list and nearly a year on the list overall. In later editions, she used the name Terry Garrity. A spoken-word record album was made in 1969, based on the book, called J – The Way To Become A Sensuous Woman.

In 1977, she published Total Loving: how to love and be loved for the rest of your life, and in 1984, Story of "J": the author of The Sensuous Woman tells the bitter price of her crazy success, with her brother John Garrity as co-author. In this book she and her brother discuss how she coped with depression.
