= Susan Berman =

American journalist and author (1945–2000)

- Born: Susan Jane Berman; May 18, 1945; Minneapolis, Minnesota, U.S.
- Died: December 23, 2000 (aged 55); Beverly Hills, California, U.S.
- Resting place: Home of Peace Cemetery
- Education: University of California, Los Angeles (BA); University of California, Berkeley (MA)
- Occupations: Journalist, author
- Spouse: Christopher ("Mister") Margulies (deceased)
- Children: 2
- Relatives: David Berman (father)
- Writing career
- Language: English
- Genres: Fiction, nonfiction
- Subjects: American Mafia, Las Vegas
- Notable work: Easy Street

Susan Jane Berman (May 18, 1945 – December 23, 2000) was an American journalist and author. The daughter of mobster David Berman, she wrote about her eventual realization of her father's role in organized crime. In 2000, Berman was found murdered in her home. The case went unsolved for more than a decade until real-estate heir Robert Durst, Berman's longtime friend, was charged with her murder in 2015 and convicted in 2021.

== Early life ==
Susan Berman was born in Minneapolis, Minnesota, in 1945, the only child of the former Betty Ewald, a traveling dancer who had adopted the stage name Gladys Evans, and David "Davie" Berman. Berman always maintained that her father—a major Jewish-American organized crime figure who took over the Flamingo Hotel after Bugsy Siegel's 1947 gangland murder—died under mysterious circumstances on an operating table when she was 12, but all indications are that he died of a heart attack during surgery. She also believed uncertainty surrounded her mother's presumed suicide by overdose a year later.

Berman grew up in Las Vegas and, later, in Hollywood, California, where her classmates and friends at the Chadwick School included Jann Wenner and Liza Minnelli. Berman received a Bachelor of Arts degree in 1967 from the University of California, Los Angeles, where she met American real estate heir Robert Durst. In 1969, she graduated with a Master of Arts in journalism from the University of California, Berkeley. Berman was gradually paid a total of $4.3 million by the Mafia for her father's interests in casinos and other properties.

== Career ==
Berman was a novelist and author of two memoirs, along with a 1971 college guidebook, The Underground Guide to the College of Your Choice. Her first memoir, Easy Street, detailed her life as a mobster's daughter. While representing her in the 1970s, the William Morris Agency talked with several Hollywood producers interested in adapting the book into a screenplay. The movie rights were ultimately sold for $350,000, but no film project ever materialized. For a time, Berman attempted to finance a musical based on the Dreyfus affair, in which Durst declined to invest.

In San Francisco, Berman wrote for media outlets including the San Francisco Examiner, Francis Ford Coppola's City Magazine, the Westinghouse Evening Show on KPIX-TV, and the People show on CBS. She was a contributing writer for magazines such as New York, Cosmopolitan and Family Circle. She also wrote Driver, Give a Soldier a Lift! and Lady Las Vegas, accompanying the 1996 release of an A&E documentary, for which she was a co-writer and nominated for a Writers Guild of America award.

At the time of her death, Berman was working on a project for Showtime with attorney Kevin Norte. Entitled Sin City, it was being planned as Showtime's answer to the HBO hit The Sopranos.

== Personal life ==
Berman lived just off the Sunset Strip on Alta Loma Road in West Hollywood for several years prior to her final residence in Benedict Canyon, in Los Angeles. Her manager, Nyle Brenner, later told the Los Angeles Times that "many details of Ms. Berman's personal life are unclear" and added "she had been married once in the 1980s, and later helped rear the two children of a boyfriend." Berman was married to Christopher "Mister" Margulies, in June 1984 at the Hotel Bel-Air; Durst walked Berman down the aisle. Margulies died of a heroin overdose in 1986. Berman kept close ties to friends on Alta Loma Road, at the Las Vegas Strip, and in New York City, including Durst.

== Murder ==
Berman was found murdered, execution style with a 9mm handgun, on Christmas Eve 2000 in her rented Benedict Canyon home, and was presumed to have been dead at least one day.

On March 14, 2015, Durst was arrested in New Orleans on a first-degree murder warrant, issued out of Los Angeles. Although his presumed victim was not immediately named by authorities, the Los Angeles Times first reported that he had been detained in connection to Berman's slaying. Three days after his arrest, Los Angeles District Attorney Jackie Lacey said that, if convicted, Durst could face the death penalty in California for "special circumstances of murder of a witness and lying in wait." Durst was transferred to California and arraigned there in early November 2016.

Multiple accounts, including Murder of a Mafia Daughter by Cathy Scott, have reported possible connections between Berman's murder and the 1982 disappearance of Durst's first wife, Kathleen McCormack Durst. Berman became a confidante of Durst at UCLA in the late 1960s, and came to know McCormack after later moving to New York. In a review of Scott's book, True Crime Zine suggested that "detectives came to suspect one of [Berman's] longtime friends, but have never been able to charge him with murder." Durst was also considered a prime suspect in his wife's disappearance and, many years after she was last seen, was eventually charged in the case.

Berman claimed to have acted as a media spokesperson for Durst, and is believed to have facilitated his public alibi. In 1982, she provided the case with a deposition, a copy of which Durst faxed to investigators after her murder. Berman had remained Durst's friend and received two $25,000 checks from him in the months before her death; she had last written to Durst on November 5, 2000, expressing hope that her financial entreaties would not ruin their friendship. Earlier in 2000, the New York State Police, at the request of then-Westchester County District Attorney Jeanine Pirro, had reopened an investigation into Kathleen's disappearance, and was urged by the missing woman's friends, without apparent success, to contact Berman for an interview. Berman was killed weeks after the reopened investigation was publicized.

Durst's 2015 arrest warrant mentioned a previously undisclosed typewritten letter, mailed from New York on January 9, 2001, to a West Los Angeles police station, titled, "Possible motive for Susan Berman murder." The letter said Berman suspected Durst had been involved in his wife's disappearance, and specified that Durst was planning to visit her in late December.

On September 17, 2021, Durst was convicted of Berman's murder and, several weeks later, was sentenced to life in prison. Four months after the conviction, he died in prison.

Berman is interred at Home of Peace Memorial Park in East Los Angeles, California.

== Books ==
=== Nonfiction ===
- The Underground Guide to the College of Your Choice (Signet, 1971), ISBN 0451078373
- Easy Street: The True Story of a Mob Family (The Dial Press, 1981), ISBN 978-0385271851
- Lady Las Vegas: The Inside Story Behind America's Neon Oasis (TV Books, 1996), ISBN 978-1575000206

=== Fiction ===
- Driver, Give a Soldier a Lift (Putnam, 1976), ISBN 978-0399117046
- Fly Away Home (Avon Books, 1996), ISBN 978-0380781799
- Spiderweb (Avon Books, 1997), ISBN 978-0380781805

== In popular culture ==
In the 2010 film All Good Things, the character Deborah Lehrman, portrayed by Lily Rabe, is inspired by Susan Berman. The film depicts Lehrman being murdered by the character Malvern Bump, who is inspired by Morris Black. It is implied that Bump murders Lehrman on the orders of David Marks, inspired by Durst, in order to prevent her from revealing incriminating information about Marks.

The story of Susan Berman's suspicious death and suspected murder was covered by a CBS News Productions documentary series 48 Hours, Season 29, Episode 19, "Murder 90210", release date January 30, 2016 (USA).

The case was the basis for the Law & Order: Criminal Intent episode "Maledictus".
