= Holocaust memoir =

Authorship of Holocaust memoirs refers to the collective process of authorship, by hundreds of Holocaust survivors, who published memoirs in the decades following World War II.

== Overview ==
In the 1950s, the publication of two highly prominent memoirs, namely Night by Elie Wiesel, and Diary of Anne Frank, opened up an area of writing which would see the publication of hundreds of new memoirs over the following decades.

== See also ==
- Evidence and documentation for the Holocaust
- List of Holocaust survivors

=== Published works ===
- Bibliography of the Holocaust
- Bibliography of Nazi Germany#Holocaust, ideology, Jews, the SS, and racism
- The Holocaust in the arts and popular culture § Literature
- List of posthumous publications of Holocaust victims
- Holocaust survivors § Memoirs and testimonies
