= America's 60 Families =

1937 non-fiction book

- Cover of the 1946 printing of America's 60 Families
- Author: Ferdinand Lundberg
- Language: English
- Genre: Non-fiction
- Publisher: Vanguard Press
- Publication date: 1937
- Publication place: United States
- Pages: 495 (1937 printing)
- OCLC: 256489013
- Dewey Decimal: 339.20973
- LC Class: HG181
- Followed by: The Rich and the Super-Rich

America's 60 Families is a book by American journalist Ferdinand Lundberg published in 1937 by Vanguard Press. It is an argumentative analysis of wealth and class in the United States, and how they are leveraged for purposes of political and economic power, specifically by what the author contends is a "plutocratic circle" composed of a tightly interlinked group of 60 families.

The controversial study has met with mixed reactions since its publication. Though praised by some contemporary and modern reviewers, and once cited in a speech by Harold L. Ickes, it has also been criticized by others and was the subject of a 1938 libel suit by DuPont over factual inaccuracies contained in the text. In 1968 Lundberg published The Rich and the Super-Rich, described by some sources as a sequel to America's 60 Families.

== Background ==
Ferdinand Lundberg was an iconoclastic journalist and writer who spent his career pillorying the American upper class over what he charged was its grip on the United States' economy. According to Lundberg, he quit his job as a reporter at the New York Herald Tribune to pen his first book, Imperial Hearst: A Social Biography, which was published in 1936. An unflattering look at the life and business of the publishing tycoon William Randolph Hearst, it ascribed to Hearst what The New York Times would later describe as "fascist political ambitions ... abetted by an unholy alliance of big bankers". The book, whose foreword by Charles A. Beard said that Hearst would face "oblivion in death", caused an immediate stir and was described by Foreign Affairs as "an annihilating study of the newspaper magnate" worthy of "wide attention". (Note: Lundberg later charged that the film Citizen Kane was an unauthorized adaptation of Imperial Hearst and sued Orson Welles. The case, which went to trial, resulted in a hung jury.)

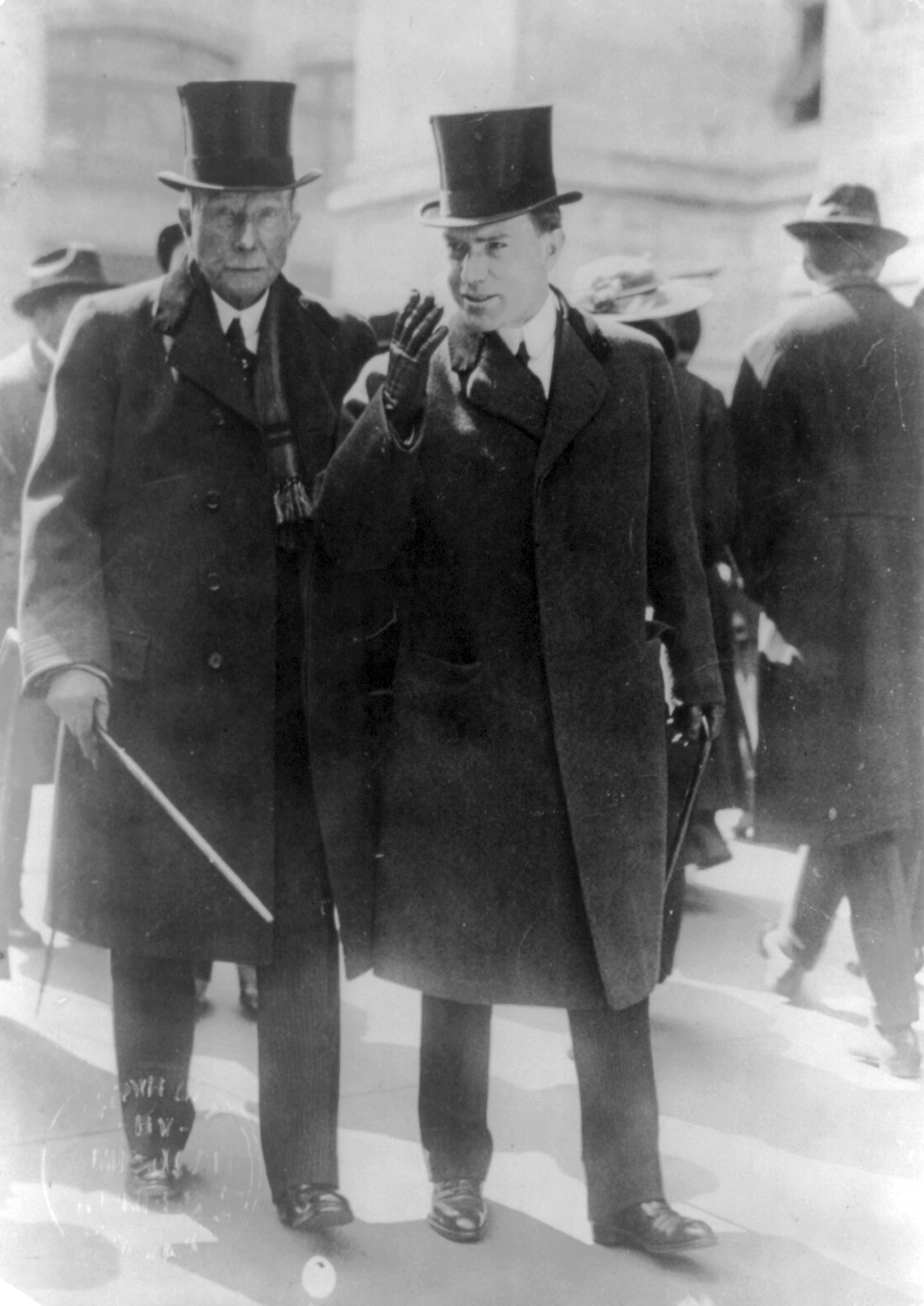
Lundberg claimed families such as the Rockefellers (pictured, John and John D. Rockefeller Jr.) controlled American institutions.

America's 60 Families was Lundberg's second book. Published in 1937 by Vanguard Press, it joined several previous works by American authors and commentators which purportedly identified a cartel of families or individuals that controlled most of the wealth in the United States, part of what has been described as "a generational moral reaction against the perceived depredations of the monied class".

In the book's foreword, Lundberg mentions two of those commentators, journalist Gustavus Myers and diplomat James W. Gerard. (Note: Gerard claimed 59 men and women "ran" the United States.) Similar publications during this time also included Matthew Josephson's The Robber Barons: The Great American Capitalists, 1861-1901 (1934), Anna Rochester's Rulers of America (1936), Frederick Lewis Allen's The Lords of Creation (1936), and Horace Coon's Money to Burn: Great American Foundations and Their Money (1938).

== Content ==
=== Overview ===
In America's 60 Families Lundberg analyzes 1924 income tax payments (Note: In 1923 and 1924, the U.S. Congress mandated partial disclosure of information from tax returns.) to estimate levels of consolidated familial wealth and to map networks of capital interconnectedness in the United States. Using his findings, Lundberg asserts that a small group of 60 interlinked American families control the mainstream media, the United States economy, and have unchecked influence over American political institutions. He goes on to claim this nucleus of 60 families is supported by a larger group of 90 families of secondary prestige. According to Lundberg, this situation is unique to the United States as the plutocracies of Europe had largely disintegrated due to World War I:

In Germany and Austria-Hungary the dominant elite of wealth – landowners, bankers, and industrialists – were virtually pauperized overnight. In France and England, seriously weakened, increasingly timorous, they staggered under tax burdens, and even yet are bedeviled by grave problems upon whose tranquil solution depends their future well-being. In Russia they were simply annihilated. Europe's wealthiest aristocrat until the World War was the Archduke Frederick of Austria, whose estate before 1914 was valued as high as $750,000,000. But no Europeans or Asiatics have ever been so wealthy as the Rockefeller, Ford, Harkness, Vanderbilt, Mellon, and Du Pont families of America.

According to Lundberg, the 60 families slowly wrested control of the state during the 19th century and, beginning with the presidency of Grover Cleveland, essentially held total control over national institutions. He contends that U.S. entry into World War I was brought about through pressures applied on the government by J.P. Morgan and John Francis Dodge, and that America's leading universities are at the behest of the 60 families due to influence applied through the endowment system. Lundberg also criticizes the New Deal, saying that it represents "one faction of wealth – the light goods industrialists – pitted in bitter political struggle against another faction – the capital-goods industrialists" and that it only appears to be a popular program to benefit the working class due to Franklin Roosevelt's insistence of such.

=== The 60 Families ===
The "60 families" named by Lundberg included the Rockefeller, Morgan, Ford, Vanderbilt, Mellon, Guggenheim, Whitney, Du Pont, and Astor families, among others, though Lundberg also noted that many wealthy Americans had not placed on his list because their wealth was in the form of individual fortunes and not familial or dynastic assets. Examples of this latter group included Harvey Firestone, Frederick H. Prince, and Samuel Zemurray. "Whether their fortunes will eventually be placed on a permanent family basis," Lundberg wrote, "is not yet known". (Note: The descendants of Harvey Firestone would, some years after the publication of America's 60 Families, marry into the Ford family.)

== Reception ==
=== Critical reaction ===
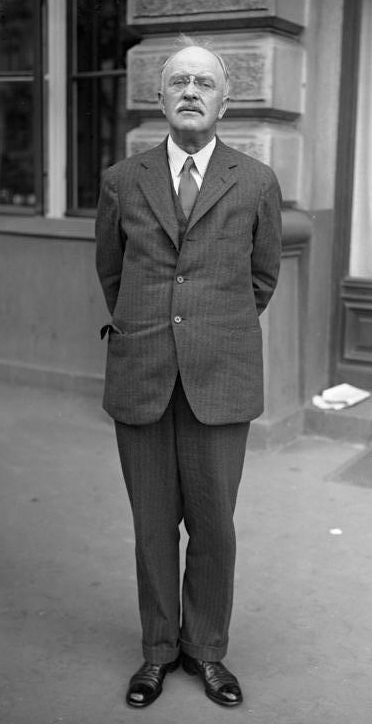
Oswald Villard criticized America's 60 Families, eliciting a rebuttal in Lundberg's pamphlet Who Controls Industry?

Kirkus Reviews called the book "dynamite" and a "depressing and exciting reading red flag to the bull of economic unrest". Writing in the Annals of the American Academy of Political and Social Science, Michael Scheler declared America's 60 Families was comparable to Karl Marx's Capital and described it as "unquestionably the best contribution to the socialist critique of capitalist economy".

The book reviewer for the Wilkes-Barre Record opined that, "Lundberg bends so far to the left that his spine threatens to snap at times" but nonetheless concluded that "Lundberg really should be read". Writing in Science & Society, Harvey O'Connor also gave the book a mixed appraisal, observing that while the book constituted a "comprehensive indictment ... of the power of great fortunes" based on "encyclopedic research", Lundberg suffered from "the New York myopia" in describing the situation he presents as essentially beyond correction.

Writing in the Saturday Review of Literature, Oswald Garrison Villard criticized America's 60 Families, describing it as "bitter muckracking", lamenting that it merely revisited old themes, and ultimately dismissing it with the caution that as "a guidebook to American folly and scandal it has a place. How I hope it will not find its way to Hitler and Mussolini! It would be held by them to be proof positive that our democracy is beyond hope". Several years later, Nazi politician Robert Ley, head of the German Labor Front, published a pamphlet in Germany titled Roosevelt Betrays America! in which he cited Lundberg's book as proof that "nowhere are as many scoundrels running around loose as in the United States".

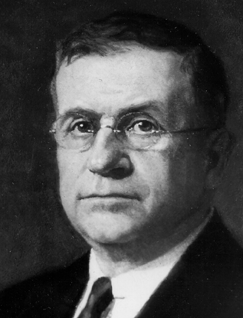
Harold Ickes cited America's 60 Families to argue for the New Deal, despite Lundberg's attacks on New Deal supporters.

=== Ickes–Jackson speeches ===
United States Secretary of the Interior Harold L. Ickes obliquely referred to the book in a December 1937 speech in which he declared that "the 60 families" had engineered the Great Depression. The following month, he directly referenced the book in a speech given in support of the New Deal, despite the fact that Lundberg used America's 60 Families, in part, to attack the "New Dealers" and cited instances of campaign contributions made by the "60 families" to Franklin Roosevelt's political campaigns. Ickes' speeches were coordinated with a similar one given by U.S. Assistant Attorney-General Robert H. Jackson to the American Political Science Association. In it, Jackson declared that American young people had to start their careers at "the bottom of an impossibly long ladder of a few great corporations dominated by America’s 60 families".

According to Thomas Fleming, noting the criticisms Lundberg had made in the book about the Roosevelt administration of which Ickes was a part, "Ickes clearly assumed the vast majority of his audience was too dumb" to have read it. At the time of Ickes' speech, United States Senator Josiah Bailey also criticized Ickes' reference to the book, saying "there are men in places of authority who wish to undermine free enterprise".

=== Libel lawsuit ===
In January 1938 E. I. du Pont de Nemours and Company filed a $150,000 libel claim against Lundberg and his publisher, Vanguard Press, over what it said were false and defamatory remarks contained in the book about the company and the DuPont family, specifically that DuPont had defrauded the U.S. government on contracts during World War I. In settlement of the suit, Lundberg and Vanguard issued a full retraction of the claim.

=== Modern views ===
During a 1974 interview with The New York Times, political activist Ralph Nader said he found "some of his best ammunition in books that most businessmen have forgotten", citing America's 60 Families among those volumes. In 1983, Nader further explained that "I read all the muckraker books before I was fourteen – America’s 60 Families, The Jungle."

In 1995 journalist and political biographer Robert Caro noted that he had frequently used the book as a reference in his own writings and, in 2016, called it "one of the greatest examples of political reporting."

== Sequels ==
The year after publication of America's 60 Families, Lundberg published Who Controls Industry?, a 32-page pamphlet containing rebuttals of criticisms made of the book. To Villard's attack that America's 60 Families did not present an original thesis and was likely to be exploited by Hitler or Mussolini, Lundberg replied that it was "'new' enough to be at the occasion of a national political furor". He said that Villard was a "life-long friend and Harvard classmate" of the banker Thomas W. Lamont who was "on visiting terms with Mussolini". (Note: Lamont had met with Benito Mussolini on several occasions while helping to secure a loan for the Italian government from J.P. Morgan & Co. He also spent some time as president of the Italian-American Society.)

In 1968 Lundberg released the 750-page tome The Rich and the Super-Rich, published by Lyle Stuart. Describing the new book as an "inflationary continuation-extension" of America's 60 Families, Kirkus Reviews gave it a cooler reception than it had afforded America's 60 Families three decades prior, writing that "Mr. Lundberg is not only a sloppy writer, he is also misleading". In The American Scholar, Asher Lans penned a more positive review of The Rich and the Super-Rich, saying that while it was "too long, at points factually erroneous, and often prone to oversimplification", these faults were minor and the volume represented an "immensely important and provocative popularization of insufficiently noticed tendencies in the political economy".

== Publication history ==
America's 60 Families was first published in the United States by Vanguard Press. It was subsequently translated into several languages and re-released in English multiple times:

- 1937 – New York: Vanguard Press
- 1938 – Maastricht: Leiter-Nypels (Dutch)
- 1938 – Amsterdam: Allert de Lange (German)
- 1939 – New York: Halcyon House
- 1940 – New York: Halcyon House
- 1941 – Tokyo: Ikusei Sha (Japanese)
- 1946 – New York: Citadel Press
- 1948 – Prague: Svoboda (Czech)
- 1948 – Moscow: Publishing House of Foreign Literature (Russian)
- 1960 – Prague: Cooperative Work (Czech)
- 1960 – New York: Citadel Press

== See also ==
- Elite theory
- Iron law of oligarchy
- The Power Elite
