= YMCA Building (Riverside, California) =

Building in Riverside, California

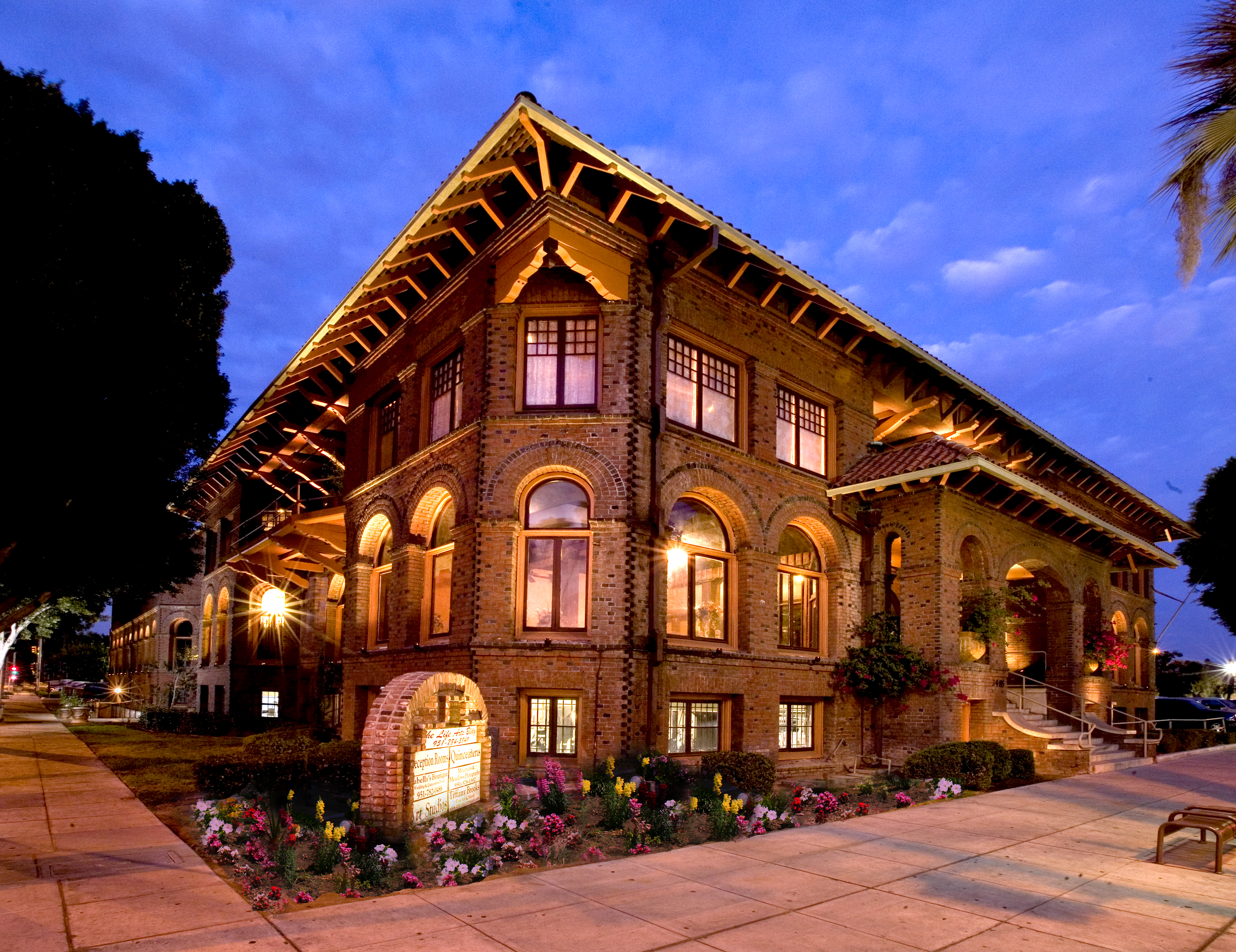
- Historic Y.M.C.A. Building taken in October 2009 for Centennial Celebrations on November 5, 2009

- Location within California
- 33°56′26″N 117°25′11″W
- Location: Riverside, California

Site notes
- Architectural style: Italian Renaissance-palazzo

Riverside Landmark
- Reference no.: 41

The YMCA Building is a structure in downtown Riverside, California, that has been used for various functions over the years; currently, it is the Life Arts Center. The Life Arts Center rents its three halls on the main floor for wedding receptions, business events, graduations and quinceañeras. The top floor has 25 studios rented by artists. These were once the hotel rooms rented to guests by YMCA. The bottom floor, which was a gymnasium, is now vacant. The building was designed in the style of an Italian Renaissance palazzo. In 1980, the building was granted historic status by the city and designated as city landmark #41.

== History ==
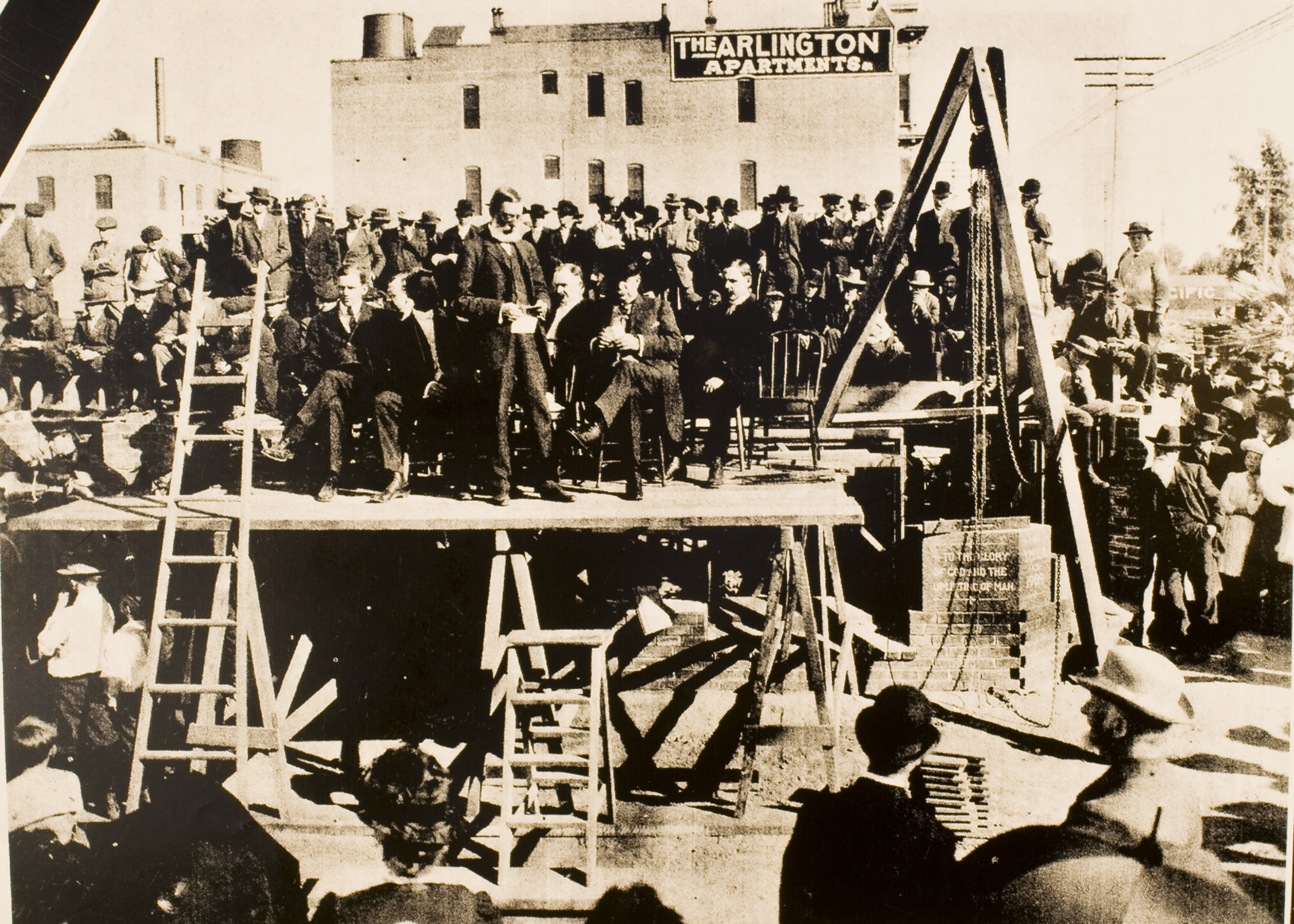
Inauguration of the Y.M.C.A. Building in 1909

Built in 1909, it was the second YMCA building in Riverside. YMCA vacated the building in 1968, moving to premises at 4020 Jefferson Street. In 1974 the building was purchased and refurbished by Bent Corydon for use as a franchise of the Church of Scientology. The 40,000 square foot building was, at the time, the largest Mission of the church. Corydon left the Church a few years later. In 1992, Corydon won a ten year legal battle against the Church of Scientology for ownership of the building. The building is now owned by Life Arts Center Incorporated, with Corydon as president.

== See also ==
- List of landmarks in Riverside, California
- List of YMCA buildings
