= The Sensuous Woman =

Book by Terry Garrity

- Author: Joan (Terry) Garrity
- Language: English
- Subject: Human sexuality
- Publisher: L. Stuart
- Publication date: 1969
- Publication place: United States
- Media type: Print

The Sensuous Woman is a book written by Terry Garrity and issued by Lyle Stuart. Published first during 1969 with the pseudonym "J", it is a detailed instruction manual concerning sexuality for women. It is notable for greater frankness in discussing sex than other literature of its era.

== Summary ==
Acknowledging the wide ranges of emotions associated with sexual activity, the premise of the book is that women in the modern era have great potential for enjoyable sex, orgasms, and greater intimacy with their husbands or paramours.

J recommends women increase their sensitivity with various tactile experiences, taking sensuous baths, dancing, and most importantly masturbation, with various methods described. J stresses that masturbation and sex are normal and wholesome activities, and that women should ignore those who attempt to make them feel shame about them.

The author gives tips about fashion and voice training. She encourages readers to care for their health, including early treatment for venereal disease. The reader is encouraged to keep a diary of her sexual appetite, to encourage her to think about her sexual ethics, and to practice sexual role-play to keep relationships interesting.

J discusses how to select sexual partners, both for casual sex and marriage. She explains various sexual techniques, including how to be a giving partner while still looking after one's own pleasure. She gives advice on attending orgies, including how to avoid advances from lesbians. Finally, she discusses how to become receptive to love and contentment.

== Reception ==
The book was a best-seller and remained popular for years because its frankness about sex was rare in books of its era. The author had "thought about the unthinkable," according to the New York Times, by attempting to demystify sex in an era when sex was normally hinted at indirectly.

Some readers were very angry about the book. Garrity was besieged with demands for details of her personal life. Her real name was leaked to Time magazine by her publisher, according to Garrity, which resulted in increased attacks on her, including several attempts at sexual assault. Her mental health suffered because of the fame of the book and hostile reactions to it.

In 1982, author Anita Diamant compared The Sensuous Woman with Alexandra Penney's then-popular How to Make Love to a Man. Diamant found "the most dramatic difference" was in their recommendations on faking orgasms—with Garrity for it and Penney against it. This difference, said Diamant, "underscores the popularization of the ideas of women's absolute right to equal pleasure and honesty between the sexes."

The Sensuous Woman was among the six books chosen by career columnist Penelope Trunk for her list of "best books," as published in the September 21, 2007 edition of The Week magazine.

== Audio version ==
An audio version of the book titled The Way to Become the Sensuous Woman by "J" was released on Atlantic Records in 1971 with "J" voiced by Connie Zimet (credited as "Connie Z").

== Cultural references ==
The album Music for Sensuous Lovers by "Z", released by Mort Garson in 1971, is a quote from the book's title.

== See also ==
- The Sensuous Man
