= Walter Liggett =

American journalist

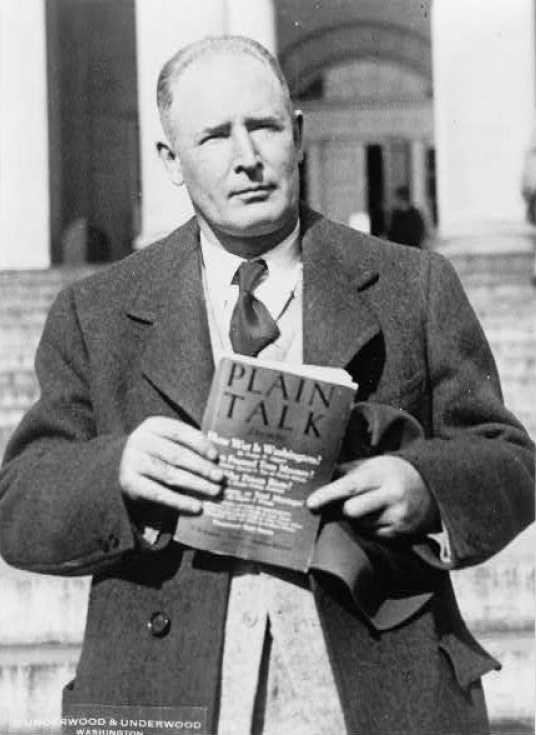
- Walter W. Liggett in 1929.
- Born: Walter William Liggett; February 14, 1886; Minnesota
- Died: December 9, 1935 (aged 49); Minneapolis, Minnesota
- Occupation: Newspaper editor/Journalist

Walter William Liggett (February 14, 1886 – December 9, 1935), was an American journalist who worked at several newspapers in New York City, including the New York Times, The Sun, New York Post, and the New York Daily News. In the Twin Cities during the 1930s, Liggett worked as an investigative journalist and editor of the newspaper Midwest American. He specialized in exposés of Minneapolis and Saint Paul organized crime and their connections to corrupt politicians. He wrote novels including The River Riders. Subjects he wrote about included the timber business in northern Minnesota and the Alaskan gold rush events. He became involved in politics and covered political corruption. He was murdered as a result.

== Early life ==
Liggett's mother, Mathilda Root "Tillie" Brown, married William Liggett on 3 July 1876 in Union County, Ohio, USA. They had moved to a stock farm in Swift County, Minnesota after William Liggett, who was serving in the Ohio state militia, was severely wounded while suppressing the Cincinnati riots of 1884. William Liggett was a forward-looking, Progressive Republican, was the founder and later, the Dean of the Agricultural College of the University of Minnesota.

Walter Liggett was born on a farm near Benson, Minnesota on February 14, 1886, into a family of Scotch-Irish descent. His father, William Madison Liggett, served in the 96th Ohio Infantry Regiment of the Union Army during the American Civil War.

== Career ==
After leaving college, Walter Liggett worked for a succession of newspapers in Saint Paul, Skagway, Alaska, Pasco, Washington, and in New York City. Although for years he was a card-carrying member of the American Socialist Party, Liggett did not consider himself a Marxist. Rather, he was a sort of old-school Mid-Western Populist-Socialist. Beginning in 1915, he was active in the Nonpartisan League of North Dakota, and during World War I, he became the managing editor of the Press Bureau of the Nonpartisan League.

Liggett campaigned with U.S. Representative Charles August Lindbergh (born Carl Månsson) against United States involvement in the First World War and was the speechwriter and secretary for the elder Lindbergh when he ran for governor of Minnesota in the Republican primary in 1918 as the write-in Farmer-Labor candidate. Liggett was in the Committee that founded and established the Farmer-Labor Party in the period between 1918 and 1920.

In 1921 he accompanied Senator Edwin Fremont Ladd, a Nonpartisan League candidate, to Washington, D.C. as his secretary and speechwriter. Senator Ladd was the model for the Frank Capra film Mr. Smith Goes to Washington. In the 1920s in the midst of massive journalistic output, Liggett was active in efforts to free Sacco and Vanzetti and Thomas Mooney.

In 1929–1930, he vaulted to national prominence with a series of articles for Plain Talk magazine which described the corruption wrought by Prohibition on American cities such as Washington, D.C., Boston and Minneapolis. When Congress held its first ever hearings on the efficacy of Prohibition in February 1930, Liggett was the first witness called to testify, for the simple reason that he was the most knowledgeable person in America on the subject of how the national experiment in Prohibition was not working. For this series of articles, Walter Liggett was nominated for the Pulitzer Prize in 1931.

During the 1932 Presidential election, Liggett published a negative biography of Herbert Hoover, The Rise of Herbert Hoover. Although the book lacked an Index, it remains probably the best critical, detailed biography of Herbert Hoover. Walter Liggett's interactions with Herbert Hoover dated back to the Russian famine of 1921 when, after being hired as head of a famine relief organization by Ludwig Martens, a Soviet spy under diplomatic cover, Liggett was investigated as a possible CHEKA mole by the Federal Bureau of Investigation at Hoover's request as Secretary of Commerce.

Before he returned to Minnesota and the polemical battle that ended his life, the literary output of Walter Liggett was simply enormous. He wrote scores upon scores of articles in newspapers and magazines as well as four books. His literary style was mid-way between the classical American Prose of Mark Twain and the 'Modern' journalism of Ernest Hemingway. Unfortunately for posterity, most of his literary output was printed on pulp paper, and very little of it has been digitized.

Besides his biography of Herbert Hoover, Liggett wrote several novels along the lines of his first literary hero, Jack London. They are "The River Riders", about the Timber Interests in Northern Minnesota; "Pioneers of Justice", about the North West Royal Mounted Police; and "The Frozen Frontier" based on his own experiences in Alaska at the end of the Klondike Gold Rush.

=== Crusade ===
Floyd B. Olson had been elected governor of Minnesota on the Farmer-Labor Ticket in 1932, while Liggett was comfortably writing novels in an easy chair living with his family in a flat at Kew Gardens in Queens. In 1933 Walter Liggett returned to his home state of Minnesota with his wife Edith Fleischer Liggett, and his two children, William Wallace Liggett, and Marda Molyneux Liggett. His intention was to engage in partisan journalism, to help build the Farmer-Labor Party of Minnesota into a viable third party of national prominence.

Arriving in St. Paul off the train he met and was received by governor Floyd B. Olson, the titular head of the Farmer-Labor Party, who said. "Welcome aboard." He bought an old press and established a weekly newspaper of which he was both Editor and Publisher. It was called the "Mid-West American". They moved the paper from Bemidji to Rochester and finally to Minneapolis. At first, getting back into his element in Minnesota, Liggett was fired with admirable zeal. But he was soon dismayed by evidence of rampant corruption in the Farmer-Labor Machine that had developed during the twelve years that he had been in the east, and barnstorming around the country engaged in muckraking journalism.

On Labor day, 1934, after the announcement on the radio that Floyd Olson had chosen a certain lawyer, John Hougen to be his campaign manager for his 1934 re-run for the gubernatorial seat, Arthur C. Townley the founder of the Nonpartisan League called for a meeting of the old "Wheel-horses" of the Nonpartisan League at the armory in Benson, Minnesota. The meeting and the subsequent internal "Revolt" were all written up in the "Mid-West American".

A. C. Townley and his following were concerned about the blatant corruption in the Leadership of the Farmer-Labor Party centering in the person of the titular head of the FLP, governor Floyd B. Olson and his political "Machine". From September 1934 until December 9, 1935, Walter Liggett, with his little weekly newspaper, fought the Olson Machine fearlessly in an alliance that was called the "Liggett - Townley Revolt". Liggett had become disgusted by what he saw as mounting evidence of corruption within the Farmer-Labor Party, of which the 'elder Lindbergh' - Charles August Lindbergh, A. C. Townley, and he himself had been among the chief founders in 1918.

In a series of articles in the "Mid-West American", Liggett accused senior Farmer-Labor politicians of collusion with the leaders of the Twin Cities both the Irish mob and Jewish-American organized crime. He especially focused on their alleged connections to the North Minneapolis-based Romanian Jewish crime family and led by Jacob Blumenfeld and his older brother Isadore Blumenfeld, alias "Kid Cann". Liggett even made regular accusations of political corruption and racketeering against Minnesota Governor Floyd B. Olson, whom Liggett said deserved to be impeached and prosecuted. Liggett also repeatedly called in his articles for the United States Federal Government to become actively involved in investigating and prosecuting organized crime in the Twin Cities, as they had recently done so successfully against Chicago Outfit boss Al Capone.

In response, Isadore Blumenfeld arranged a meeting with Liggett and allegedly offered him a bribe to stop his exposés. Liggett refused to accept the money and said that if he did it would make him even worse than Blumenfeld. Considering himself disrespected, Blumenfeld and his associates savagely beat Liggett up a short time later. Liggett unsuccessfully attempted to press charges.

Soon after, Liggett was arrested and prosecuted on kidnapping and sodomy charges, but was acquitted after evidence of perjury by the alleged victims came to light. Liggett escalated his attacks and began printing a list of reasons for Olson's impeachment on the front page of the Midwest-American.

In response, Blumenfeld associate Meyer Schuldberg telephoned Liggett and threatened him with a lawsuit for slander. Liggett responded, "Go ahead if you think I can't prove what I say!" Schuldberg allegedly responded that there were other ways to shut him up.

== Murder ==
Soon after, at six p.m on the evening of December 9, 1935, Walter Liggett was slain in a drive by shooting with a Thompson submachine gun, as he stepped out of his car, groceries in his hand, in the lane behind his apartment in Minneapolis. His wife Edith and daughter Marda were in the car only a few feet away and witnessed his death. Weeping and saying that she would never forget his grinning face, Mrs. Liggett picked Blumenfeld out of a police lineup as her husband's killer. Three other witnesses also identified Blumenfeld as the shooter.

=== Trial ===
In a trial which made worldwide headlines, Mrs. Liggett and the three other witnesses testified that Blumenfeld was the shooter. The car from which the shots were fired was tracked down and found to be owned by A. Z. Syndicate associate Meyer Schuldberg.

Mrs. Liggett, however, never believed that there was "a Chinaman's chance" of Blumenfeld's trial ending with a conviction. She believed that Blumenfeld had committed the murder at the behest of the "Syndicate", whose headquarters were in the top floor of a skyscraper in New York City. Both Governor Olson and political fixer Charles Ward were further believed by Mrs. Liggett to have been in the loop. At the trial of Kid Cann, Edith Liggett referred to the Blumenfeld brothers in court as "Olson's gang."

Despite considerable evidence, Blumenfeld was acquitted. No one else was ever charged and Blumenfeld remained a major Jewish-American organized crime figure. He was successfully prosecuted for multiple crimes, including jury tampering, during the Eisenhower and Kennedy administrations. He died as a free man of heart disease in 1981.

== Legacy ==
In an April 1940 article, D. H. Dubrovsky, the former head of the Russian Red Cross, alleged that the murder of Walter Liggett had been committed by the Soviet secret police. While this remains unconfirmed, Earl Browder, the head of the American Communist Party, which had previously been a very harsh critic of the Farmer-Labor Party, traveled to Minnesota and met with Floyd Olson on October 18, 1935. Then, shortly before Liggett's murder, the Minnesota District Committee of the CPUSA had met and, in a complete reversal of their former position, they pledged their support for Olson's administration and denounced the Ligget-Townley Revolt as a Capitalist Plot to disrupt the Farmer-Labor Party from within.

Marda Liggett Woodbury, who was only a child when she witnessed her father's murder, grew up to become a professional librarian. She wrote a biography of her father, Stopping the Presses: The Murder of Walter W. Liggett, which was published by University of Minnesota Press in 1998.

== See also ==
- Censorship in the United States
- List of journalists killed in the United States
- List of unsolved murders (1900–1979)

== Books ==
- Woodbury, Marda Liggett, Stopping the Presses: The Murder of Walter W. Liggett. Minneapolis: University of Minnesota Press (1998)
