= Marvin L. Kline =

American architect

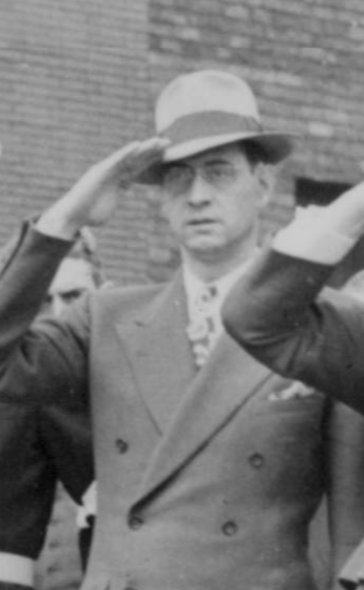
- Kline in 1930

34th Mayor of Minneapolis
- In office 1941–1945
- Preceded by: George E. Leach
- Succeeded by: Hubert Humphrey

Personal details
- Born: Marvin Lewis Kline; August 9, 1903 Brunswick, Nebraska, U.S.
- Died: April 9, 1974 (aged 70) Ventura, California, U.S.
- Party: Republican
- Education: University of Minnesota
- Profession: Architectural engineer

Marvin Lewis Kline (August 9, 1903 – April 9, 1974) was an architectural engineer, Republican politician, charity head, and criminal who served as the 34th mayor of Minneapolis.

== Early life and career ==
Kline was born in Brunswick, Nebraska in 1903. His family moved to Redwood Falls, Minnesota in 1915 and he went on to attend the University of Minnesota, graduating in 1929 with a degree in architectural engineering. He worked with the Minnesota Department of Transportation and later joined the firm of that became Wessel, Brunet & Kline. In 1935, he was elected to the Minneapolis City Council. He was re-elected to a second term in 1939 and became the council's president.

== Mayoralty ==
In 1941, Kline was elected mayor. During his time in office he worked with the city of St. Paul, Minnesota and the state government to form the jointly run Metropolitan Airports Commission. Kline was criticized by some (including journalist Arthur Kasherman) of corruption and collusion with the city's criminal underworld. According to a contemporaneous FBI document, the SAC Rhodes of the FBI field office in St. Paul (Note: From 1941–1949, what is now the FBI Field Office in Minneapolis was located in St. Paul.) was also reported to believe that "Kline is controlled by the racketeers". He was defeated in 1945 by Hubert Humphrey who ran on a platform of law and order and cleaning up the city's government.

== Charity crime ==
In 1946, Kline was hired as the executive director of the Sister Kenny Rehabilitation Institute, for which he had previously been in an unpaid position on their board of directors. In June 1960, Minnesota Attorney General Walter Mondale released a report saying the Kline "was enabled to derive unconscionable personal profit from his position", including "fees" that had been paid to him from the people handling the charity's publicity and promotion. In 1961, Kline was convicted of grand larceny in state court for illegally boosting his salary as director by creating false documentation upping his salary from $25,000 per year to $48,000. He was sentenced to Stillwater Prison for 10 years. In 1963, he and four fellow defendants were convicted in federal court of conspiracy and mail fraud for having diverted millions of dollars in funds raised during the charity's mail-based fundraising campaigns.

He was released from prison in 1967.

== Later life and death ==
After being released, Kline briefly worked as an engineer at the Twin Cities Army Ammunition Plant before suffering from a stroke and retiring. Kline died of a heart attack in Ventura, California in 1974. He is buried in Blair, Nebraska.

== Notes ==
Political offices
Preceded by George E. Leach	Mayor of Minneapolis; 1941 – 1945	Succeeded by Hubert Humphrey
