= Lyle Stuart =

American publisher (1922–2006)

- Born: Lionel Simon; August 11, 1922; New York City, U.S.
- Died: June 24, 2006 (aged 83); Englewood, New Jersey, U.S.
- Occupations: Publisher, author
- Organization(s): Lyle Stuart Inc., Barricade Books
- Spouses: Mary Louise Stuart (d. 1969); Carole Livingston (m. 1982)
- Children: Rory Stuart

Lyle Stuart (born Lionel Simon; August 11, 1922 – June 24, 2006) was an American author and independent publisher of controversial books. He worked as a newsman for years before launching his publishing firm, Lyle Stuart, Incorporated.

A former part-owner of the original Aladdin Hotel & Casino in Las Vegas, Stuart was also a noted gambling authority, who advised casinos on how to protect themselves from cheats and cons. He had a wide circle of friends, freely admitting to a lively sex life. He was fond of gambling, with baccarat and craps being his games of choice. His gambling bestsellers were Casino Gambling for the Winner, Winning at Casino Gambling, and Lyle Stuart on Baccarat. He boasted, in Casino Gambling for the Winner, of having won $166,505 in ten consecutive visits to Las Vegas.

== Career ==
=== The Walter Winchell feud ===
Stuart had first gained national notoriety by taking on the powerful newspaper columnist Walter Winchell in a series of scathing magazine articles, collected in book form, as The Secret Life of Walter Winchell, in 1953. After serving with the United States Merchant Marine and the Air Transport Command in World War II, he worked for William Randolph Hearst's International News Service, Variety, Music Business, and RTW Scout.

In 1951, he launched a monthly tabloid named Exposé (name later changed to The Independent) designed to publish those stories and articles that others would not have dared publish because they might have offended subscribers or advertisers. Contributors included Upton Sinclair, Norman Mailer, George Seldes, Ted O. Thackrey and John Steinbeck.

=== EC Comics ===
In the early 1950s, he was the business manager of the EC Comics line published by Bill Gaines, a close friend.

In 1956, with $8,000 of the money he collected from libel actions against Walter Winchell, Confidential, ABC-TV, and Editor & Publisher, he began his publishing company, Lyle Stuart, Inc., of which, as noted below, Kensington Books subsequently acquired ownership.

=== Lyle Stuart, Inc. ===
The publishing firm for which Stuart was best known, Lyle Stuart, Inc., was founded in 1955 with the proceeds of a lawsuit settlement. In 1965, in partnership with Loujon Press, Stuart published Charles Bukowski's second important poetry collection, Crucifix in a Deathhand, though the firm was better known for publishing books such as The Sensuous Woman and Naked Came the Stranger.

In the early 1980s, Lyle Stuart Inc. made a deal with UK publishers Target Books/W H Allen for US distribution of the paperback novelizations of the TV series Doctor Who, coinciding with the increasing popularity of the show on US public broadcasting.

The company was sold in 1988 to developer Steven Schragis, who started Carol Publishing. In 2000, Carol Publishing filed for bankruptcy and was itself sold to the Kensington Publishing Corporation.

=== Barricade Books ===
In 1997, Stuart's publishing house Barricade Books reissued The Turner Diaries, a novel thought to have been the inspiration behind Timothy McVeigh's bombing of the Murrah building. He was a strong advocate of freedom of the press, and believed it was important for people to be able to read and make up their own minds. (In the introduction he wrote to his reissue of The Turner Diaries, he made clear how strongly he opposed the viewpoint expressed in the book.)

Also in the 1990s, casino mogul Steve Wynn sued Stuart over catalog copy. The copy on Running Scared, a biography of Wynn, made reference to a New Scotland Yard report that tied the Las Vegas tycoon to the Genovese crime family. (The book refuted some of the report's findings.) Stuart lost the libel case and was ordered to pay three million dollars in defamation, forcing him into bankruptcy. This judgment was overturned on appeal by the Nevada Supreme Court in 2001 and sent back for a new trial, which Wynn chose not to pursue.

== Personal life ==
Stuart was born in Manhattan on August 11, 1922. He described himself as an "atheist of Jewish ancestry". Stuart's first wife, Mary Louise Stuart, died in 1969. They are the parents of jazz guitarist Rory Stuart. Later Stuart married Carole Livingston Stuart in 1982 and they were married until his death.

Stuart, especially in his last years, was a resident of Fort Lee, New Jersey. He died from a heart attack at a hospital in Englewood, New Jersey, on June 24, 2006, at age 83.

== Selected works, as author or publisher ==
- God Wears a Bow Tie (1950)

a novel written by Lyle Stuart

- Inside Western Union (1950)
- The Secret Life of Walter Winchell (1953)
- Inside The FBI (1967)
- The Rich and the Super-Rich (1968)
- Naked Came the Stranger (1969)
- The Sensuous Woman (1969)
- The Anarchist Cookbook (1970)
- The Sensuous Man (1971)
- The MAD World of William M. Gaines (1972), Library of Congress Card No. 72–9178
- Jackie Oh! (1978)
- Casino Gambling for the Winner (1978), ISBN 978-0-8184-0267-8
- The Prostitute Murders: The People Vs. Richard Cottingham (1983)
- Du Pont Dynasty: Behind the Nylon Curtain (1984)
- L. Ron Hubbard: Messiah or Madman? (1987)
- Uncomfortable Questions for Comfortable Jews (1987)
- Black Robes, White Justice (1987), ISBN 0-8184-0422-1
- Winning at Casino Gambling (1994), ISBN 978-1-56980-012-6
- Lyle Stuart on Baccarat (1997), ISBN 978-1-56980-105-5 ISBN 0818407174
