= Tabloid (film) =

- Directed by: Errol Morris
- Produced by: Julie Bilson Ahlberg; Mark Lipson
- Cinematography: Robert Chappell
- Edited by: Grant Surmi
- Music by: John Kusiak
- Production companies: Air Loom Enterprises; Moxie Pictures
- Release dates: September 3, 2010 (Telluride Film Festival); July 15, 2011 (U.S.)
- Running time: 87 minutes
- Country: United States
- Language: English

Tabloid is a 2010 American documentary film directed by Errol Morris. It tells the story of Joyce McKinney, who was accused of kidnapping and raping Kirk Anderson, an American Mormon missionary in England, in 1977. The incident, known as the Mormon sex in chains case, became a major tabloid story in the United Kingdom and triggered a circulation battle between two popular tabloid newspapers, the Daily Express and the Daily Mirror.

For the film, Morris interviewed McKinney, former Daily Express journalist Peter Tory (1939-2012), and Daily Mirror photographer Kent Gavin, among others. The film makes reference to various aspects of Mormon culture, such as temple garments.

== Synopsis ==
The film, narrated primarily by McKinney herself and supplemented by other interviews with primary characters and experts, is presented by animated headlines, newspaper photos, and brief televised news reports from the time of the case. McKinney details her upbringing as a charismatic young beauty queen with a self-reported IQ of 168. In search of a "clean-cut, all-American boy" for a potential husband, McKinney is introduced to Kirk Anderson, a young Mormon man on the eve of his religious mission. McKinney states that she and Anderson fell madly in love and were engaged to be married, but that she mistrusted the Church of Jesus Christ of Latter-day Saints and its hold over Anderson, declaring the church to be a "cult" that "brainwashed" him. Former-Mormon-turned-activist Troy Williams offers insight into Mormon practices, beliefs, and attitudes to explain how Mormonism might seem cult-like to one not raised in the religion.

When Anderson was sent to England on his mission, McKinney, believing the church elders deliberately separated them, recruited a pilot (Jackson Shaw, who appears in interviews) to fly her, her friend Keith "K.J." May, and a hired bodyguard named Gil Parker to England on a "rescue mission" McKinney framed in terms of a romantic caper. Upon arriving in England, McKinney allegedly revealed items such as handcuffs, chloroform, and a fake handgun, causing Shaw and Parker to fear they were participating in a crime and immediately return to America, leaving McKinney and May to continue alone.

McKinney secretly contacted Anderson and persuaded him to meet with her. On 14 September 1977, Anderson was officially reported missing. At this point, the accounts begin to differ, with McKinney claiming Anderson willingly went with her and May to a cottage in Devon, where she and he had voluntary sex for several days. Anderson, however, claimed in police reports that he was forced into a car at gunpoint, driven into the countryside, and chained to a bed by May and McKinney, at which point McKinney raped him, telling him she would continue to do so until she became pregnant. McKinney admits Anderson was chained to the bed, but states he consented to the bondage in an effort to overcome his intense guilt regarding premarital sex. Williams suggests the truth perhaps lies somewhere between Anderson's and McKinney's differing accounts, and that Anderson may have initially gone willingly, and even engaged in consensual sex, but McKinney may have ignored his later objections.

After three days in Devon, Anderson proposed marriage to McKinney (later telling police he did so in hopes of tricking McKinney into freeing him), and McKinney, Anderson, and May returned to London on 17 September. Upon discovering Anderson's disappearance was being investigated as a kidnapping, Anderson persuaded McKinney to allow him to go to police to assure them he was safe, and he did not return. McKinney speculates the Mormons threatened him with excommunication if he refused to go along with the false kidnapping narrative, but, according to police records, Anderson reported he had been abducted and sexually assaulted. Two days later, on 19 September, McKinney and May agreed to meet with Anderson in what turned out to be a police sting, and the pair were arrested and charged with kidnapping, possession of a replica firearm, and sexual indecency (as there were no laws regarding the sexual assault of a man by a woman at the time).

At a pre-trial hearing, McKinney delivered a colorful statement professing her love for Anderson and detailing their sexual escapades, insisting he had come with her willingly and their sex had been consensual. The newspapers, particularly the tabloids, were charmed by McKinney and the scandalous case, and they printed every detail. McKinney was released on bail after spending three months in Holloway Prison, and she lived the life of a celebrity for a time, including attending the premiers of Saturday Night Fever and The Stud. A few weeks before their trial for kidnapping was scheduled to begin, McKinney and May fled the UK, traveling incognito in a variety of outlandish disguises, and McKinney was found guilty in absentia of skipping bail, as the authorities declined to pursue extradition.

Back in the United States, McKinney spoke exclusively with journalist Peter Tory of the Daily Express, painting herself as an ordinary young woman in extraordinary circumstances. Meanwhile, photographer Kent Gavin of the rival British tabloid the Daily Mirror obtained evidence that McKinney had funded her trip to England by working as a call girl in California, collecting a dossier of hundreds of photos of a nude McKinney performing BDSM acts, some of which were subsequently published in the Mirror.

In 1984, seven years after her escape, McKinney returned to the spotlight when she was arrested in Utah for stalking Anderson, who was married to another woman, at his workplace.

In August 2008, McKinney again made international headlines after becoming the first private individual to have an animal commercially cloned. McKinney initially denied she was the same woman involved in the "Manacled Mormon" case thirty years prior, but she eventually released a statement admitting her real identity. South Korean biologist Jin Han Hong, who participated in cloning McKinney's deceased pet pit bull, gives a brief overview of the process, stressing that their work cannot "create life" from nothing.

McKinney claims she has spent the last thirty years writing a book about her life and the kidnapping case (to be titled A Very Special Love Story), but that her efforts have been hindered by documents being stolen from her home and vehicle, including evidence proving the nude photographs published by the Mirror were doctored (Gavin counters that the Mirror possessed the original negatives of all the nude photos, but says they were lost when the Mirror changed ownership). She says she never married, as Anderson is the only man she will ever love, so she lives alone with her five cloned pit bulls in rural North Carolina, where she is still occasionally bothered by journalists and the curious.

End text reveals that May died in 2004 and Anderson did not wish to be interviewed for the film.

== Soundtrack ==
Tabloid (Music From The Motion Picture)

Soundtrack album by John Kusiak
- Released: July 12, 2011
- Genre: Soundtrack
- Length: 46 Minutes

The film's score was composed by John Kusiak, who had previously worked with Errol Morris on The Fog of War and First Person. According to Kusiak, the process of composing music for Morris' projects is unusual, as Morris "likes to have music early on in the process and he likes to actually edit the film to the music rather than the traditional Hollywood approach.” A soundtrack album was officially released by Milan Records on July 12, 2011.

== Release ==
Tabloid premiered at the Telluride Film Festival on September 3, 2010. It was picked up for distribution by Sundance Selects and given a limited theatrical release beginning on July 15, 2011.

=== Critical response ===
On review aggregator website Rotten Tomatoes, the film has an approval rating of 92% based on 122 reviews, with an average score of 7.5 out of 10; the site's "critics consensus" reads: "It's far from his most thought-provoking work, but Tabloid finds Errol Morris as smart, spirited, and engaging as ever." On Metacritic, the film has a weighted average score of 74 out of 100 based on 34 critics, indicating "generally favorable reviews".

Roger Ebert gave the film four out of four stars, favorably comparing the way it showcases multiple, contradictory accounts of the same events, with Morris reluctant to frame any version of the story as "true", to Akira Kurosawa's Rashomon (1950). In his review of the film, A. O. Scott of The New York Times praised Morris for his skills as an interviewer, writing: "Mr. Morris has developed a knack for finding that zone in each person’s character where lucidity intersects with delusion and where the urge to perform collides with the impulse to dissemble. People seem to be inventing themselves in front of his camera and then, a moment later, unmaking themselves."

== Legal action against Morris ==
In November 2011, Joyce McKinney filed a lawsuit with the Los Angeles County Superior Court against Errol Morris, claiming Morris and his producer Mark Lipson misled her into believing she was being interviewed for a television series about innocent people whose lives were ruined by the paparazzi and a media circus, and that she was not aware until after the release of the film that it would be a feature-length film focused solely on the "Manacled Mormon" case. McKinney sued on the grounds that she was defamed, as the film portrays her as "crazy, a sex offender, an S&M prostitute, and/or a rapist."

McKinney's attorney, Steve Tidrick, "introduced some unusual evidence to poke holes" in Morris' defenses — "the type of challenging material that would befit a Morris documentary, in fact."

"For example, in one document, a declaration [was] given by Philip Wong, an associate professor of psychology at Long Island University, about how viewers process movies subconsciously."

"Similar to the way the band Judas Priest was once sued for using subliminal messages in a song that allegedly caused a teenager to commit suicide, McKinney used Wong to push the theory that Tabloid isn’t what it appears to be."

"Pointing to material that flashes for very short periods of time in the documentary, Wong declare[d] under penalty of perjury, 'In the film Tabloid, manipulation of attention and perception leads to material being presented at the fringes of a viewer’s awareness, which can facilitate the development of rogue beliefs.'"

In 2013, the case was decided in Morris' favor.

In January 2016, McKinney again filed suit against Morris, claiming the film had misrepresented her and that Morris and his associates had broken into her home, stolen personal items related to the case, and threatened the life of her service dog if she did not sign release papers allowing them to use her footage in the film. In response, legal representatives for Morris stated that "evidence will show that [McKinney] willingly – in fact, eagerly – participated in the lengthy interview that is featured in the film." Morris stated in an interview later that year that this case had been dismissed as "frivolous".
