= Bobby Fischer Against the World =

2011 American documentary film

- Film poster
- Directed by: Liz Garbus
- Produced by: Nancy Abraham; Stanley F. Buchthal; Liz Garbus; Matthew Justus; Rory Kennedy
- Cinematography: Robert Chappell
- Edited by: Michael Levine; Karen Schmeer
- Music by: Philip Sheppard
- Distributed by: HBO
- Release dates: January 2011 (Sundance); June 6, 2011 (United States)
- Running time: 94 minutes
- Country: United States
- Language: English

Bobby Fischer Against the World is a 2011 documentary film that explores the life of chess Grandmaster and 11th World Champion Bobby Fischer. It incorporates interviews with chess players Anthony Saidy, Larry Evans, Sam Sloan, Susan Polgar, Garry Kasparov, Asa Hoffmann, Friðrik Ólafsson, Lothar Schmid and others. It includes rare archive footage from the World Chess Championship 1972.

Director Liz Garbus began her work on the film after Fischer's death in 2008, at the age of 64. She said of Fischer: "It's hard to imagine that in 1972, all eyes were on a chess match, but it does, in fact, seem to be the case. Bobby Fischer was this self-taught Brooklyn boy who took the New York chess scene and then the national chess scene by storm. And the Russians had been dominating the sport for decades. ... So for an American to have a real chance at beating that [Soviet] machine, this was big stuff. ... The symbolism of the match was enormous."

The film is dedicated to editor Karen Schmeer, who was killed in a hit-and-run accident while they were already a few months into the editing process.

== Reception ==
On the review aggregator website Rotten Tomatoes, 88% of 51 critics' reviews are positive. Metacritic, which uses a weighted average, assigned the film a score of 76 out of 100, based on 12 critics, indicating "generally favorable" reviews.

Peter Bradshaw of The Guardian gave the film four out of five stars and wrote that it's "gripping".

Dennis Harvey of Variety wrote, "Pic is a fascinating if rather depressing tale with a largely unknowable misanthrope and narcissist at its center. Interviewees, from chess experts to Henry Kissinger, add valuable commentary."

Chess historian Edward Winter noted the high quality of the archive material presented. He did not, however, approve of the loose anecdotal stereotypes about chess that were presented by some of the interviewees in the documentary.

== See also ==
- List of books and documentaries by or about Bobby Fischer
