= Manacled Mormon case =

1977 criminal case

- 1984 mugshot taken of perpetrator Joyce McKinney when subsequently arrested in 1984 in Salt Lake City, Utah, on charges she again was stalking her 1977 victim, Anderson
- Duration: 14–17 September 1977
- Location: Alleged abduction: Near Epsom, England; Assault: Devon, England
- Motive: McKinney's self-professed lovesickness or "all-consuming passion".
- Outcome: Anderson says he escaped by feigning to alleged captors that he would inform church authorities of his soon elopement with McKinney.
- Arrests: McKinney and alleged accomplice Keith May
- Charges: Kidnapping of Anderson after chloroforming him, possibly involving two non-working replicas of .38 revolvers; Indecent assault
- Verdict: (No trial on main charges)
- Convictions: McKinney and May, in absentia, for skipping bail
- Sentence: One year's imprisonment if bail money (£1,000 each) not returned
- In April 1978, McKinney and May absconded on false passports. McKinney remains a fugitive from justice in the UK. May died in 2004.

The manacled Mormon case, also known as the Mormon sex in chains case, was a case of indecent assault and kidnap of Kirk Anderson, a young missionary of the Church of Jesus Christ of Latter-day Saints (LDS Church), by an American woman, Joyce McKinney, in England in 1977. Because McKinney and her accomplice, Keith May, skipped bail and fled to the United States before the case could be tried and were not extradited, they were never tried for these specific crimes. According to Anderson, he had been abducted by McKinney from the steps of a church meeting house, chained to a bed and raped by being made to penetrate her.

After the case, McKinney resided in the US with a falsified passport. McKinney later discussed the case in the 2010 documentary film Tabloid; she filed lawsuits against the film's director, Errol Morris, in 2011 and 2016, both of which were dismissed in court. In 2019, McKinney was homeless and living in her vehicle when she was charged with the hit-and-run manslaughter of a 91-year-old pedestrian; the court found her a mentally incompetent defendant and sent her for psychiatric treatment, confirming in 2020 that she would remain in a psychiatric hospital, with reviews of her competence at future dates.

== The crime ==
On 14 September 1977, Kirk Anderson, a young missionary for Church of Jesus Christ of Latter-day Saints (LDS Church), was abducted from the steps of an LDS Church meetinghouse in Ewell, Surrey, England. His abductor was Keith May, aged 24, who had posed as an investigator into Mormonism, using a fake handgun and chloroform. Three days later, a freed Anderson made a report to police that he had been driven to a cottage in Devon and chained to a bed against his will, at which point Joyce Bernann McKinney had attempted to seduce and then raped him by forcing him to penetrate her.

== Judicial proceedings ==
Police set up a sting operation by having Anderson set up a 21 September rendezvous with McKinney and May, leading to the two suspects being arrested on 19 September. The pair were charged with kidnap and indecent assault, which they vigorously denied. While being taken to Epsom for a court appearance, McKinney held a notice up at the window of the police vehicle saying, "Kirk left with me willingly!" At the committal hearing, she stated of Anderson: "I loved him so much that I would ski naked down Mount Everest in the nude with a carnation up my nose if he asked me to." Press reports and McKinney's solicitor referred to the size differential between McKinney, who weighed 120 lb (54 kg), and the 250 lb (110 kg) Anderson, described as being 6 ft 2 in (1.88 m) tall. Under the Sexual Offences Act 1956, then in force in the United Kingdom, no crime of rape was deemed to have been committed since the victim was male; however, indecent assault of a man did apply.

McKinney and May skipped bail and absconded from the UK on 12 April 1978. Their trial for kidnap had been due to begin on 2 May. In June a judge at London's Central Criminal Court sentenced McKinney and May in absentia to a year in prison for skipping bail (if their bail money, £1,000 each, was not paid to the court in forfeit). At the time, no extradition treaty existed between the UK and US and the British government never made any attempt to pursue extradition proceedings against either McKinney or May.

On 18 July 1979, May and McKinney were both arrested in the US by the Federal Bureau of Investigation on charges of making false statements in order to obtain passports. They both received suspended sentences.

== Coverage in the media ==
British newspaper coverage of the case was extensive in the final months of 1977. Some newspapers sought to obtain "scoops" on the story, and to undermine each other as they managed to obtain and publish exclusive information. For example, the Daily Mirror researched McKinney's past and reported over several days that she had previously been a nude model. The Daily Mail attempted to devalue the Mirror's reports by advertising itself as "the paper without Joyce McKinney."

Brian Whitaker has observed that the case provided "light relief" for the newspaper-reading public, from more serious stories about politicians. Roger Wilkes states that the coverage of the case "cheered Britain up no end".

A Church of Scotland working party on obscenity in 1979 observed the "gusto" with which newspapers covered and followed the case, observing the coverage was accompanied by "the kind of illustration which a decade ago would have been under plain sealed cover".

The coverage was extensive in part because the case was considered so anomalous, involving as it did the issue of rape of a man by a woman. Backhouse and Cohen reported in 1978 that many men, privately, expressed their disbelief of such a possibility.

The case was documented in Joyce McKinney and the Manacled Mormon, a book by Anthony Delano in 1978, who based his work on assembled Daily Mirror coverage. The events were documented musically by the UK band Radio Stars in their recording of 'Sex in Chains Blues'.

== Later developments ==
In 1984, McKinney was again the subject of police action for allegedly stalking Anderson, who by this time was married with children. At the time of her apprehension, McKinney was found living in her vehicle near Salt Lake International Airport, where Anderson worked. A search of the vehicle uncovered road maps, rope, handcuffs and notebooks keeping detailed records of Anderson's routines. McKinney insisted that she had driven to the airport to book a flight, though it was later revealed that she had driven several thousand miles from her home in North Carolina.

In 2008, a story about a woman named "Bernann McKinney" appeared in the media after the woman had her pet dog cloned in South Korea. Journalists tied the two incidents together in articles identifying facial similarity between "Bernann McKinney" and Joyce Bernann McKinney. After initial denials, the International Herald Tribune and other publications carried an admission by McKinney that she was the person named in the 1977 case.

The revival of interest in the story led the documentary filmmaker Errol Morris to produce a 2010 film, Tabloid, based on the media sensation surrounding the story. The film gives extra details, from press reports of the day and from participants in the story, to the use of a (possibly fake) gun during Anderson's abduction, and Anderson being tied up during his alleged rape by McKinney. The film also gave further details regarding McKinney's work as a call girl, earning funds for her team's international adventure by offering bondage and S&M services around the time she became obsessed with Anderson.

In January 2016, McKinney filed suit against Morris, claiming that she had been misrepresented in the film and that Morris and others related to the documentary's production had broken into her home, stolen personal items related to the case, and threatened the life of her service dog if McKinney did not sign release papers allowing them to use her footage for the film. Legal representatives for Morris stated that "evidence will show that [McKinney] willingly – in fact, eagerly – participated in the lengthy interview that is featured in the film." Morris stated in an interview later that year that the suit had been dismissed as "frivolous".

In 2011 Anderson was a real estate agent and was avoiding publicity. May, McKinney's co-conspirator from the 1977 case, died in 2004. At one point, McKinney lived in Newland, in the western North Carolina mountains. More recently, she has lived as a homeless person in the San Fernando Valley region of Los Angeles.

=== Vehicular manslaughter charge ===
In July 2019, the Los Angeles Police Department's Valley Traffic Division (VTD) named McKinney as the person involved in a fatal hit and run that took the life of 91-year-old Gennady Bolotsky. The incident took place in the North Hollywood neighbourhood of Valley Village on Monday, 16 June 2019, at around 5:40 a.m. Bolotsky was walking his dog at a crosswalk on Magnolia Boulevard and Wilkinson Avenue when he was struck by a white 2006 GMC pick-up truck. The incident was captured by surveillance video from a nearby business. Stills from this video were released by police, and locals identified the vehicle as belonging to a then-unidentified homeless woman who had been the subject of frequent police reports. On 21 June 2019, investigators followed a lead that the suspected vehicle was parked in the city of Burbank near the Burbank Airport. Investigators located McKinney, who appeared to be living in the vehicle along with her three dogs.

During the investigation, detectives learned that McKinney had outstanding warrants for battery and public nuisance from an unrelated investigation. McKinney was taken into custody for her preexisting warrants and booked into Valley Jail Division in Van Nuys. McKinney's vehicle was impounded by VTD investigators and processed for evidence related to the fatal collision. On 1 July 2019, the VTD presented their case to the Los Angeles County District Attorney and charged McKinney with assault with a deadly weapon other than a firearm, hit and run with injury and vehicular manslaughter. A sentencing enhancement was proposed due to injury to a person over 70 years of age. McKinney remained in custody on the previous warrants, under a combined bail of $137,500. If convicted, she faces up to a maximum of 11 years in state prison. McKinney was ordered to a psychiatric evaluation and, on 11 July 2019, she was sent to the Los Angeles Court division for mentally incompetent defendants. McKinney was taken to the Metropolitan State Hospital in Norwalk. In February 2020, a judge in Van Nuys ruled once again she was not competent. Her next hearing was scheduled for August 2020.
