= Barry Sonnenfeld =

American film director and cinematographer (born 1953)

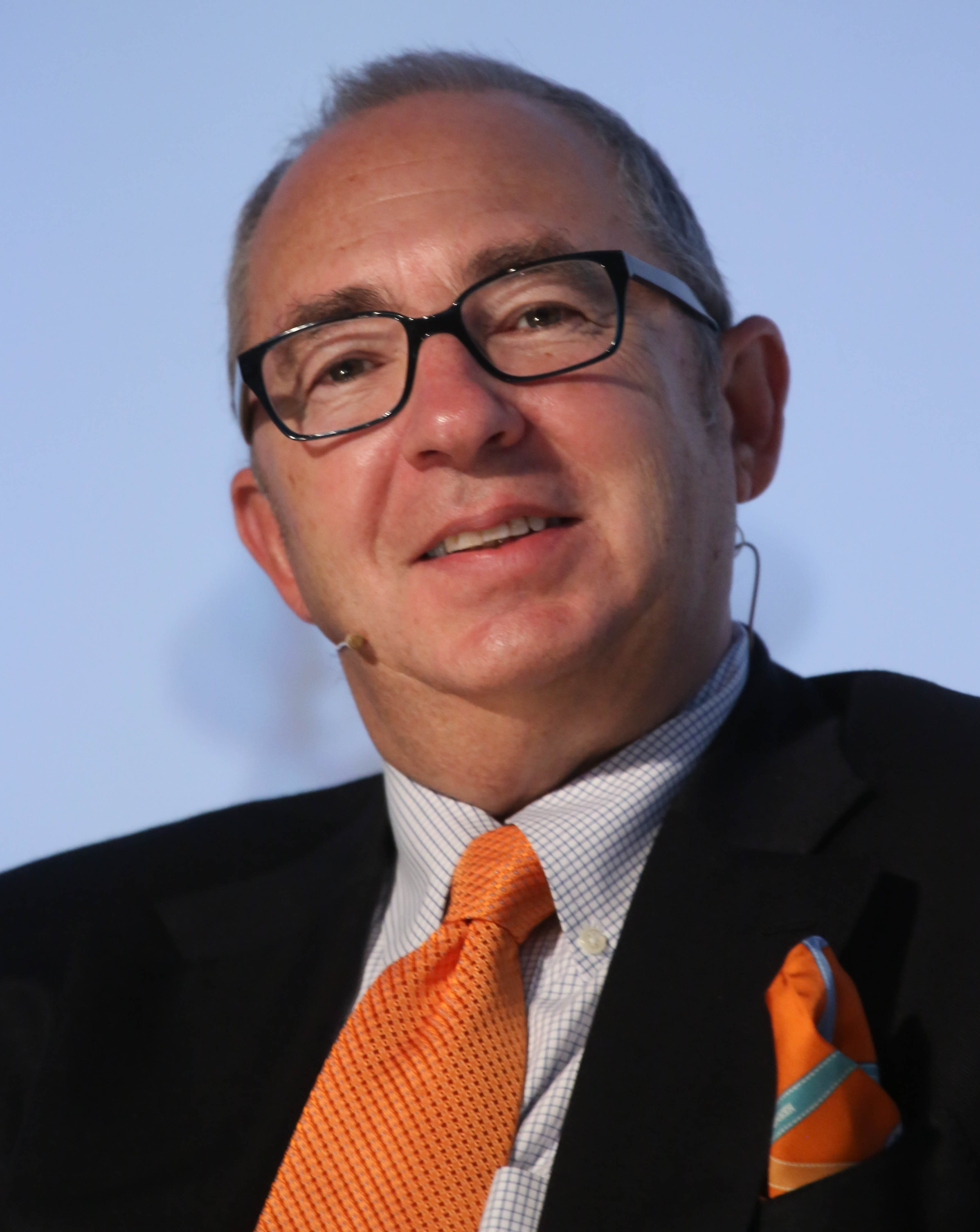
- Sonnenfeld in October 2012
- Born: April 1, 1953 (age 73); New York City, New York, U.S.
- Education: Hampshire College (BA); New York University (MFA)
- Occupations: Film director; producer; cinematographer
- Years active: 1978–present
- Spouse: Susan L. "Sweetie" Ringo (m. 1989)
- Children: Chloe Sonnenfeld

Barry Sonnenfeld (born April 1, 1953) is an American filmmaker and television director. He originally worked as a cinematographer for the Coen brothers before directing comedy films like The Addams Family (1991), Get Shorty (1995), the Men in Black trilogy (1997–2012), Wild Wild West (1999), and RV (2006).

== Early life ==
Sonnenfeld was born and raised in New York City, the son of Irene "Kelly" (Kellerman), an art teacher, and Sonny Sonnenfeld, a lighting salesman, educator, and architectural lighting designer. He was raised in a Jewish family. After he received his bachelor's degree from Hampshire College, he graduated from New York University Film School in 1978.

== Career ==
He began working on pornographic films before starting work as director of photography on the Oscar-nominated In Our Water (1982). When he met Joel Coen at a Christmas party, Coen told Sonnenfeld about Blood Simple, a script that he had written with brother Ethan Coen, and hired him to be their cinematographer, with the resulting movie coming out in 1984. This film began his collaboration with the Coen brothers, who used him for their next two pictures, Raising Arizona (1987) and Miller's Crossing (1990). He also worked with Danny DeVito on Throw Momma from the Train (1987) and Rob Reiner on When Harry Met Sally... (1989) and Misery (1990).

Sonnenfeld gained his first work as a director from Paramount Pictures on The Addams Family, a box-office success released in November 1991. Its sequel, Addams Family Values (1993), was not as successful at the box office, but he received critical acclaim for his fourth directorial outing, Get Shorty (1995). Produced by Jersey Films and based on a novel by Elmore Leonard, the film won a Golden Globe for John Travolta (Best Actor in a Comedy or Musical). The film was also entered into the 46th Berlin International Film Festival. Following Tim Burton and the Coen brothers, Sonnenfeld's films would tell stories about unusual and unorthodox people who are into the unexpected and the strange. His films would often use his trademark filmmaking techniques such as his unusual camera angles, offbeat dialogue and, in certain films, strange behavior and weird creatures. In 1995, he signed a first-look deal with Disney to produce and direct features through The Sonnenfeld Company. It was later replaced by a partnership with former Sony Pictures executive Barry Josephson to launch Sonnenfeld/Josephson Worldwide Entertainment at Disney, which was dissolved in 2000.

In 1996, Steven Spielberg asked him to direct Men in Black (1997). Starring Tommy Lee Jones and Will Smith, the film was a critical and financial success. In 1998, Jon Peters asked him to direct Wild Wild West (1999). Starring Smith and Kevin Kline, the film was a critical and financial flop. He also directed the comedy Big Trouble (2002), after which he made his most successful film sequel to that point, Men in Black II (2002). He is also a contributing editor for Esquire. He also co-produced (alongside his partner Barry Josephson) the 2007 film Enchanted for Walt Disney Pictures that starred Amy Adams. In 2008, Sonnenfeld earned an Emmy for directing Pushing Daisies. Sonnenfeld returned for Men in Black 3; released in 2012, the third installment received positive reviews and became the highest-grossing film in the series worldwide. In 2007, his Right Coast production company has been signed with Sony.

His memoir, Barry Sonnenfeld, Call Your Mother: Memoirs of a Neurotic Filmmaker, was published by Hachette Books in 2020. In 2024, his second book, Best Possible Place, Worst Possible Time: True Stories from a Career in Hollywood, was published by Hachette.

== Personal life ==
In 1999, Sonnenfeld was the sole passenger on a plane that crashed upon landing at Van Nuys Airport. He was unhurt.

As of 2022, Sonnenfeld lives in Pemberton, British Columbia, with his wife Susan.

In 2020 memoir Barry Sonnenfeld, Call Your Mother: Memoirs of a Neurotic Filmmaker, Sonnenfeld stated that he was sexually abused by his elder cousin Mike, who was his mother's cousin and who also lived with him and his parents, starting when he was five years old. According to Sonnenfeld, his parents, who let Mike live with them to help keep their difficult marriage together, knew about the sex abuse. In the 2026 documentary The Narcissist's Playbook, Sonnenfeld would again detail the alleged sex abuse he suffered through his cousin Mike.

== Filmography ==
=== Cinematographer ===
Documentary film

Year	Title	Director	Note
1982	In Our Water	Meg Switzgable	With Dick Blofson, Robert Chappell and Ken Kelsch

Feature film

Year	Title	Director
1984	Blood Simple	Joel Coen
1985	Compromising Positions	Frank Perry
1987	Raising Arizona	Joel Coen
1987	Three O'Clock High	Phil Joanou
1987	Throw Momma from the Train	Danny DeVito
1988	Big	Penny Marshall
1989	When Harry Met Sally...	Rob Reiner
1990	Miller's Crossing	Joel Coen
1990	Misery	Rob Reiner

TV series

Year	Title	Director	Notes
1984	ABC Afterschool Specials	Jeffrey Hornaday; Claude Kerven	Episodes "Out of Step" and "The Almost Royal Family"
1985	Doubletake	Jud Taylor	Miniseries

TV movies

Year	Title	Director
1984	How to Be a Perfect Person in Just Three Days	Joan Micklin Silver
1986	Welcome Home, Bobby	Herbert Wise
1986	Classified love	Don Taylor

=== Director/Producer ===
==== Film ====
Director

Year	Title	Director	Producer
1991	The Addams Family	Yes	No
1993	For Love or Money	Yes	No
1993	Addams Family Values	Yes	No
1995	Get Shorty	Yes	Executive
1997	Men in Black	Yes	No
1999	Wild Wild West	Yes	Yes
2002	Big Trouble	Yes	Yes
2002	Men in Black II	Yes	No
2006	RV	Yes	No
2012	Men in Black 3	Yes	No
2016	Nine Lives	Yes	No

Executive producer

- Out of Sight (1998)
- Lemony Snicket's A Series of Unfortunate Events (2004)
- Men in Black: International (2019)

Producer

- The Crew (2000)
- The Ladykillers (2004)
- Enchanted (2007)
- Space Chimps (2008)
- Disenchanted (2022)

==== Television ====
Year	Title	Director	Executive producer	Notes
1998	Maximum Bob	Yes	Yes	Directed "Pilot"
1998–1999	Fantasy Island	No	Yes	13 episodes
2000	Secret Agent Man	No	Yes	Also co-creator; 12 episodes
2001–2002	The Tick	Yes	Yes	Directed "Pilot"
2007–2009	Pushing Daisies	Yes	Yes	Directed 2 episodes
2007–2010	Notes from the Underbelly	Yes	Yes	Directed 6 episodes
2008	Suburban Shootout	Yes	No	Unaired pilot
2010	Funny in Farsi	Yes	No	Unaired pilot
2013	Beverly Hills Cop	Yes	No	Unaired pilot
2014	Storyline	No	Yes	1 episode
2016	Independent Lens	No	Yes	Segment An Honest Liar
2016–2019	The Tick	No	Yes	12 episodes
2017–2019	A Series of Unfortunate Events	Yes	Yes	Directed 10 episodes
2021	Schmigadoon!	Yes	Yes	Directed 6 episodes

Producer

- Karen Sisco (2004) (1 episode)

TV movies

Year	Title	Director	Executive producer
1999	Partners	No	Yes
2008	Hackett	Yes	No
2008	Play or Be Played	Yes	Yes
2009	The Bridget Show	Yes	No
2014	Dead Boss	Yes	No

=== Actor ===
==== Film roles ====
Year	Title	Role
1991	The Addams Family	Passenger on Gomez's train (uncredited)
1993	Addams Family Values	Mr. Glicker
1995	Get Shorty	Doorman (Uncredited)
1997	Men in Black	Alien on Monitor
2002	Big Trouble	Florida Gators fan on radio (voice) (uncredited)
2002	Men in Black II	Neuralyzed Father
2006	RV	Irv
2012	Men in Black 3	Husband Watching Launch
2016	Nine Lives	Additional cat voices
2026	The Narcissist's Playbook	Self, documentary

==== Television roles ====
Year	Title	Role	Notes
2001	The Tick	Guy in Couch, Cab Driver (uncredited)	Episode "Pilot"
2017–2019	A Series of Unfortunate Events	Mr. Tammerlane (voice); Isaac "Ike" Anwhistle	4 episodes
2025	The Simpsons	Mr. Ho-Hum (voice)	Episode "Guess Who's Coming to Skinner"

== Awards and nominations ==
Year	Award	Category	Title	Result
1997	Saturn Awards	Best Director	Men in Black	Nominated
1999	Golden Raspberry Awards	Worst Picture	Wild Wild West	Won
1999	Golden Raspberry Awards	Worst Director	Wild Wild West	Won
2008	Primetime Emmy Awards	Outstanding Directing for a Comedy Series	Pushing Daisies	Won
2018	Primetime Emmy Awards	Outstanding Children's Program	A Series of Unfortunate Events	Nominated
2019	Primetime Emmy Awards	Outstanding Children's Program	A Series of Unfortunate Events	Nominated
