= Theresa Spickler-Bowe =

American rapist

- Born: Theresa Spickler-Bowe
- Convictions: Rape in the first-degree; Assault in the second-degree
- Penalty: 25 years in prison
- Accomplice: Eunice Eickhoff

Details
- Victims: One (Ron Varga)
- Date: 1997
- Country: United States
- State: Washington (state)

Theresa Spickler-Bowe is a woman who was convicted of first-degree rape and second-degree assault of a 42-year-old man in Spokane County District Court in August 1997. She was sentenced to a total of 20 years and five months in prison.

Prosecutors said Spickler-Bowe, aged 36 at the time of trial, tortured her victim and raped him with a broomstick. Spickler-Bowe, together with accomplice Eunice Eickhoff who was the victim's girlfriend at the time, gave their victim frostbite by forcing him to shovel snow while barefoot, wearing a diaper and a dogchain. They broke his nose, cheek, and ribs and burned him with heated metal implements. On January 17, 1997, they raped him and threw him out of their apartment.

In her defense, Spickler-Bowe denied all the charges. She testified that her victim was a lying, abusive alcoholic who became "ugly" when he drank, that he had badly beaten her up, and that her accomplice Eickhoff was the one who had raped and burned him.

Eickhoff pleaded guilty and testified against Spickler-Bowe, naming Spickler-Bowe as the instigator. A jury of seven women and five men found Spickler-Bowe guilty.

Spickler-Bowe's sentence of more than 20 years far exceeded the usual maximum for her crimes, which was then 12 years.
