= John Kusiak =

American composer

- Born: July 20, 1948 (age 78)
- Occupation: Composer

John Kusiak (born July 20, 1948) is an American composer best known for his work with documentary filmmaker Errol Morris. He won the 2012 Cinema Eye Honors Award for Outstanding Achievement in Original Music Score for Morris' Tabloid. Kusiak has composed music for live performance, commercials, and museum installations as well as film and television. He began scoring films for Boston-based Northern Light Productions in the 1980s while he was a touring rock and roll guitarist, and founded the studio Kusiak Music in 1992. He lives in Arlington, Massachusetts.

== Work Process ==
Although his first instrument is guitar, he primarily composes film scores on piano. In an essay about scoring The Singing Revolution (a documentary about Estonian resistance during World War II), Kusiak writes that his "empathetic response to the events depicted" provided the foundation for his work process. Kusiak had minimal knowledge of Estonia's history before this project. Immersing himself in the footage and story, he developed a deep respect for the Estonian people's non-violent struggle for freedom from the Soviet Union. In order to convey chaos during the coup attempt, he utilized unconventional metrical units . The next theme, "The Hope theme" is supposed to mirror the emotional release of the Estonian people after the attempt.

== Selected credits ==
- The American Experience (TV Series) (16 episodes, 2003–2019)
- Team Foxcatcher (2016)
- The Jinx: The Life and Deaths of Robert Durst (miniseries) (2 episodes, 2015)
- After the Wall: A World United (2011)
- Independent Lens (2 episodes) (2009–2011)
- Tabloid (2010)
- The Wall: A World Divided (2010)
- Yellowstone: Land to Life (2009)
- Secrecy (2008)
- Have You Seen Andy? (2007)
- Aquarium (2007)
- The Singing Revolution (2006)
- The Fog of War: Eleven Lessons from the Life of Robert S. McNamara (2003) Additional music (primary composer Philip Glass)
- First Person (12 episodes, 2000)
- WW III: World War III (1998)

== Discography ==
- Monhegan Suite and Other Musical Journeys (2013)
- Tabloid (2011)
- Errol Morris' First Person (Music from Season Two) (2005)
- Errol Morris' First Person (Music from Season One) (2005)
- Apokalypsis (2003)
