= Karen Schmeer =

American film editor

- Born: February 20, 1970; Portland, Oregon, U.S.
- Died: January 29, 2010 (aged 39); Manhattan, New York, U.S.
- Occupation: film editor

Karen Schmeer (February 20, 1970 – January 29, 2010) was a film editor who frequently collaborated with filmmaker Errol Morris.

== Early life and education ==
Schmeer was born in Portland, Oregon. She was the daughter of Michael Schmeer and Eleanor DuBois, as well as the granddaughter of photographer Ray Atkeson.

In 1988, Schmeer graduated from Portland's Lincoln High School. In 1992 she graduated from Boston University with a degree in anthropology.

== Career ==
The year she graduated from college she was hired for an unpaid internship with Errol Morris. Schmeer edited a number of his films, including The Fog of War, a 2004 portrait of Robert S. McNamara that was nominated for an Eddie award and Fast, Cheap and Out of Control. She also edited Sergio, a 2009 film by Greg Barker about Sergio Vieira de Mello. Schmeer won the award for best documentary film editing at the 2009 Sundance Film Festival for Sergio. Other work included editing Sydney Pollack's 2005 documentary, Sketches of Frank Gehry.

== Death ==
Schmeer was killed on the evening of January 29, 2010, in a hit-and-run as she was crossing New York City's Broadway Street at 90th Street. The driver that struck her was the getaway driver for the robbery of a nearby pharmacy.

== Posthumous tributes ==
The Karen Schmeer Award for Excellence in Documentary Editing is awarded by the Independent Film Festival Boston.

The Karen Schmeer Film Editing Fellowship, created in 2010, is awarded annually.

== Awards ==
- 2002: Slamdance Film Festival, Excellence in Editing Award for My Father, the Genius
- 2004: American Cinema Editors, Eddie Award, Best Edited Documentary Film (nominee) for The Fog of War: Eleven Lessons from the Life of Robert S. McNamara with Doug Abel and Chyld King
- 2009: Sundance Film Festival, Editing Award, Documentary for Sergio

== Filmography ==
- 1997: Fast, Cheap & Out of Control
- 1999: Mr. Death: The Rise and Fall of Fred A. Leuchter, Jr.
- 1999: Theme: Murder
- 2000: Well-Founded Fear
- 2000: First Person (TV Series documentary) – episode: "The Killer Inside Me"
- 2002: My Father, the Genius
- 2002: American Experience (TV Series documentary) – episode: "A Brilliant Madness"
- 2003: The Same River Twice
- 2003: The Fog of War: Eleven Lessons from the Life of Robert S. McNamara
- 2005: American Masters (TV Series documentary) – episode: "Sketches of Frank Gehry"
- 2006: Independent Lens (TV Series documentary) – episode: "Revolution: Five Visions"
- 2008: American Son
- 2008: Standard Operating Procedure – as co-editor
- 2009: Sergio
- 2011: Bobby Fischer Against the World
- 2012: Futures Past
