= Rape by gender =

Overview of rape classified with regard to gender

Rape by gender classifies types of rape by the sex and gender of both the rapist and the victim. This scope includes both rape and sexual assault more generally. Most research indicates that rape affects women disproportionately, with the majority of people convicted being men. Since the broadening of the definition of rape in 2012 in the US by the FBI, more recognition has been given to both male rape victims and female rapists, though men continue to comprise the majority of those convicted of sexual abuse.

Since only a small percentage of acts of sexual violence are brought to the attention of the authorities, it is difficult to compile accurate rape statistics. Conviction rates differ by the gender of both the perpetrator and victim. Various studies argue that male-male and female-female prison rape are quite common and may be the least reported form of rape. (Note: Robert W. Dumond, "Ignominious Victims: Effective Treatment of Male Sexual Assault in Prison," August 15, 1995, p. 2; states that "evidence suggests that [male-male sexual assault in prison] may a staggering problem"). Quoted in Mariner, Joanne; (Organization), Human Rights Watch (2001-04-17). No escape: male rape in U.S. prisons. Human Rights Watch. p. 370. ISBN 978-1-56432-258-6.) (Note: Struckman-Johnson, Cindy; Struckman-Johnson, David (2006). "A Comparison of Sexual Coercion Experiences Reported by Men and Women in Prison". Journal of Interpersonal Violence. 21 (12): 1591–1615. doi:10.1177/0886260506294240. ISSN 0886-2605. PMID 17065656. S2CID 27639359.; reports that "Greater percentages of men (70%) than women (29%) reported that their incident resulted in oral, vaginal, or anal sex. More men (54%) than women (28%) reported an incident that was classified as rape.") Furthermore, many rape cases take place when the victims are below the age of consent, bringing in the issue of child sexual abuse or statutory rape.

== Gender differences ==
In the US, in the 2001 national Youth Risk Behavior Survey, 10.2% of girls and 5.1% of boys reported "[having] ever been physically forced to have sexual intercourse when [they] did not want to". In a 2010 study of heterosexual couples where sexual coercion existed, 45% reported female victimization, 30% reported male victimization and 20% reported reciprocal victimization. In 2011, a study supported by a research grant from the Department of Education and Science of Spain found based on a "convenience sample of 13,877 students in 32 nations" that 2.4% of males and 1.8% of females admitted to having physically forced someone into having sex in the last year. In 2010, the CDC's National Intimate Partner and Sexual Violence Survey found that 18.3% of adult women and 1.4% of adult men reported having experienced attempted or completed forced penetration in their lifetime, and 4.8% of adult men reported having been forced to penetrate someone else in their lifetime. In the same survey, 13% of adult women and 6% of adult men reported having experienced sexual coercion in their lifetime. In a 2014 study of 18,030 high school students, found no statistically significant difference between males and females for the reported rate of having been physically forced, or threatened by physical force, into unwanted sex. Males were 2.5 times as likely to report having threatened or used physical force compared to females.

== Rape of females ==
In a 2000 research article from the Home Office, in England and Wales, around 1 in 20 women (5%) said that they had been raped at some point in their life from the age of 16 beyond.

In 2011, the US Centers for Disease Control and Prevention (CDC) found that "nearly 20% of all women" in the United States suffered attempted rape or rape sometime in their lives. More than a third of the victims were raped before the age of 18.

According to a 2013 report by the CDC, 28% of victimized heterosexual women and 48% of victimized bisexual women experienced their first rape between the ages of 11 and 17.

=== Rape of females by males ===
Many rapes by males against females are unreported because of "fear of reprisal from the assailant" and because of "shame ... and deep-seated cultural notions that the woman is somehow to blame".

Pregnancy may result from rape; the rate varies between settings and depends particularly on the extent to which non-barrier contraceptives are being used. A study of adolescents in Ethiopia found that among those who reported being raped, 17% became pregnant after the rape, a figure which is similar to the 15–18% reported by rape crisis centres in Mexico. A longitudinal study in the United States of over 4000 women followed for three years found that the national rape related pregnancy rate was 5.0% per rape among victims aged 12–45 years, producing over 32,000 pregnancies nationally among women from rape each year. Experience of coerced sex at an early age reduces a woman's ability to see her sexuality as something over which she has control.

The rape of women by men has been documented as a weapon of terror in warfare (see Wartime sexual violence).

=== Rape of females by females ===
Assault/rape by forcible stimulation of female genitalia by a female perpetrator is possible by sexual penetration (e.g., digital manipulation, oral sex, strap-ons, other dildos or other foreign objects) or non-penetrative sex (e.g., tribadism). A telephone survey conducted in 2010 for the U.S. Centers for Disease Control and Prevention found that 43.8% of lesbians reported having been raped, physically abused or stalked at some point by an intimate partner; of these, 67.4% reported the perpetrator or perpetrators as being exclusively female. In the same survey, approximately 1 in 8 lesbians (13.1%) reported having been raped in their lifetime, but the sex of their rapists was not reported.

A 2005 survey by the California Coalition Against Sexual Assault (CALCASA) concluded that one in three lesbian-identified participants had been sexually assaulted by a woman. Fear of coming out, distrust of and/or indifference and hostility by the police, unwillingness to turn in members of the LGBT community, and a sense that female on female rape is not taken as seriously as rape by men causes some victims to be reluctant to report rapes by other women. In one publicized case involving students at Smith College in 2005, two women were charged with the rape of another, but the victim ultimately refused to testify, and charges were dropped.

== Rape of males ==
A CDC study found that, in the US, 1 in 71 men had been raped or suffered an attempt within their lifetime. The same study found that approximately 1 in 21 or 4.8% men in a survey had been made to penetrate someone else, usually an intimate partner or acquaintance. A NVAW Survey found that 0.1 percent of men surveyed had been raped in the previous 12 months, compared to 0.3 percent of women. Using these statistics it was estimated that, in the US, 92,748 men had been raped in the previous year. In another study by the School of Public Health at Boston University, 30 percent of gay and bisexual men reported having experienced at least one form of sexual assault during their lifetimes.

=== Rape of males by males ===
Rape by males against males has been heavily stigmatized. According to psychologist Sarah Crome, fewer than 1 in 10 male-male rapes are reported. As a group, male rape victims reported a lack of services and support, and legal systems are often ill-equipped to deal with this type of crime.

Several studies argue that male-male prisoner rape, as well as female-female prisoner rape, are common types of rape which go unreported even more frequently than rape in the general population. (Note: Human Rights Watch No Escape: Male Rape In U.S. Prisons. Part VII. Anomaly or Epidemic: The Incidence of Prisoner-on-Prisoner Rape.; estimates that 100,000–140,000 violent male-male rapes occur in U.S. prisons annually; compare with FBI statistics that estimated 90,000 violent male-female rapes occur annually.) The rape of men by men has been documented as a weapon of terror in warfare (see Wartime sexual violence). Seventy-six percent of male political prisoners in El Salvador surveyed in the 1980s described at least one incidence of sexual torture, and a study of 6,000 concentration-camp inmates in Sarajevo found that 80% of men reported having been raped. In the case of the Syrian Civil War (2011–2024), the male detainees experienced sexual abuse such as being forced to sit on a broken glass bottle, having their genitals tied to a heavy bag of water, or being forced to watch the rape of another detainee by the officials.

=== Rape of males by females ===
Male victims of sexual abuse by females often face social, political, and legal double standards. Some cases in the United States have received increased attention and sparked awareness within the population. Sometimes referred to as "made to penetrate" cases (by the CDC and the NISVS), male rape victims are forced to engage in penetration of the female without proper consent. In many cases, the male victims are under the influence of drugs or being held in life-threatening positions. The case of Cierra Ross' sexual assault of a man in Chicago gained national headlines and Ross was convicted of aggravated criminal sexual abuse and armed robbery with a bail set at $75,000. A similar case includes James Landrith, who was raped by being made to penetrate a female acquaintance in a hotel room while incapacitated from drinking, along with his rapist citing the fact that she was pregnant to advise him not to struggle, as this might hurt the baby.

In the UK, the 1970s Mormon sex in chains case brought increased awareness of the possibility of female-on-male rape. A Mormon missionary named Kirk Anderson went missing in 1977, in Ewell, Surrey, after being abducted from the steps of a church meetinghouse. A few days later, Anderson made a report to the police that he had been abducted and imprisoned against his will. He said that while he was chained to a bed, Joyce Bernann McKinney attempted to seduce him, and then raped him. News coverage was extensive, in part because the case was considered so anomalous, having involved the rape of a man by a woman. McKinney fled to the US, extradition was not pursued by Britain, and the English court sentenced McKinney in absentia to a year in jail for skipping bail. Under the then-Sexual Offences Act 1956, due to the victim's gender, technically no crime of rape was committed, though indecent assault of a man applied.

Some male victims, including underage children, have been forced to pay child-support to their attacker when their statutory rapist conceives a baby as a result of the attack.

Several widely publicized cases of female-on-male statutory rape in the United States involved school teachers engaging in sexual intercourse with their underage students. Each of the 50 states have laws regarding the age of consent, but all have it set at 16, 17 or 18. These laws make sexual encounters between adults and minors under the age of consent sexual assault.
