= The Singing Revolution =

2006 film directed by James Tusty and Maureen Castle Tusty

- Directed by: James Tusty; Maureen Castle Tusty
- Written by: Maureen Castle Tusty; James Tusty; Mike Majoros
- Produced by: Bestor Cram; Artur Talvik; Piret Tibbo-Hudgins
- Narrated by: Linda Hunt
- Cinematography: Miguelangel Aponte-Rios
- Edited by: Mike Majoros
- Music by: John Kusiak
- Production companies: Sky Films Incorporated with Northern Light Productions; Allfilm
- Distributed by: Abramorama
- Release dates: December 1, 2006 (Tallinn Black Nights Film Festival); December 2007 (United States)
- Running time: 94 minutes
- Country: United States
- Language: English
- Box office: $327,420 (US)

The Singing Revolution is a 2006 documentary film created by Americans James Tusty and Maureen Castle Tusty about the nonviolent Singing Revolution in Estonia in which hundreds of thousands of Estonians gathered publicly between 1986 and 1991, in an effort to end decades of Soviet occupation. The revolutionary songs they created anchored Estonia's non-violent struggle for freedom.

== Purpose ==
Drawn by James' Estonian heritage, filmmakers James and Maureen Tusty traveled to Estonia in 1999 to teach filmmaking courses. During their stay, they became increasingly interested in the stories they heard about the Estonian Singing Revolution; they found the story of how Estonia was able to break free from one of the most oppressive regimes the world has ever known by way of nonviolent resistance alone, to be "one of the most amazing stories" they had ever heard, and were astounded by the fact that "virtually no one outside the Baltics" knew of it. Film Critic Jessica Reaves says that in terms of the film's sheer entertainment value, that for the viewer, this general "lack of familiarity with Estonia's recent history actually works in the film's favor", in that "suspense born of ignorance lends the unfolding drama the urgency of a political thriller."

== Film content ==
=== Historical background ===
Caught in the middle between two aggressively expansionist superpowers, Nazi Germany and the USSR under Stalin, and pledged to the Soviet Union by the secret clauses in the Molotov–Ribbentrop Pact between the Nazis and the Soviets, Russian forces invaded and annexed the three Baltic countries, Estonia, Latvia and Lithuania in 1940, after the beginning of World War II. As was the case in Latvia and Lithuania, by the end of the war more than a quarter of the Estonian population had been deported, executed, or had fled the country. During the turbulent decades that followed, music became a powerful unifying force in the occupied Baltic states - a means of preserving each country's national identity, as well as a tool for political resistance in the face of cultural genocide.

=== The power of a peaceful resistance ===
Between 1986 and 1991, while there was violent turmoil and struggle for independence from the Soviet Union in the other Baltic states, Estonians courageously and peacefully demanded that the Soviets recognize their nation's right to self-determination and independent statehood. The revolutionary songs they created anchored Estonia's struggle for freedom, which was ultimately accomplished in 1991 without the loss of a single life. The Estonian activist Heinz Valk, who first dubbed Estonia's resistance the "Singing Revolution", said proudly of his countrymen, "Until now, revolutions have been filled with destruction, burning, killing, and hate, but we started our revolution with a smile and a song." Singing fueled the non-violent revolution that defeated a very violent occupation.

Combining interviews of movement leaders and Estonian citizens with rare archival footage from the period of Soviet occupation, The Singing Revolution accounts one small nation's dramatic rebirth alongside its neighbors Latvia and Lithuania where similar events took place.

== Reception ==
The film received largely positive critical acclaim, winning several awards at the film festivals at which it was shown, including "Best Documentary" (co-winner) and the "Diane Passage Jury Prize" at the 2007 Savannah Film Festival, and "Most Inspirational Film" at the Boulder International Film Festival in 2008. Film critic Robert W. Butler said of the film, "If The Singing Revolution were a fictional film, it would be dismissed as a pie-in-the-sky fantasy. But it's all true."
