= They Were There =

- Directed by: Errol Morris
- Music by: Philip Glass
- Release date: January 20, 2011
- Running time: 30 minutes
- Country: United States
- Language: English

They Were There (also known as IBM Centennial Film: They Were There - People who changed the way the world works) is a 2011 documentary short film directed by Oscar winner Errol Morris. It is a centennial film about the company IBM.
