= Team Foxcatcher =

- Directed by: Jon Greenhalgh
- Produced by: David Bennett; Jeff Callard
- Music by: John Kusiak
- Distributed by: Netflix
- Release dates: April 18, 2016 (Tribeca Film Festival); April 29, 2016
- Running time: 90 minutes
- Country: United States
- Language: English

Team Foxcatcher is a 2016 documentary film directed by Jon Greenhalgh, telling the story of billionaire John du Pont's involvement in the shaping of the US Olympic Wrestling Team by building expensive training facilities on his home property called 'Foxcatcher'. For Dave Schultz, the United States' most successful wrestler at the time, loyalty to John du Pont would eventually cost him his life.

== Cast ==
- Dan Chaid
- John du Pont
- Dave Schultz
- Nancy Schultz
- Valentin Yordanov
