= The Ashtray (Or the Man Who Denied Reality) =

Book by Errol Morris

- Author: Errol Morris
- Subject: Philosophy of science, epistemology
- Published: 2018 (University of Chicago Press)
- ISBN: 9780226922683

The Ashtray (Or the Man Who Denied Reality) is a book by Errol Morris in which he criticizes the philosophy of Thomas Kuhn.

== Title ==
In 1972, Morris met with Kuhn at the Institute for Advanced Study at Princeton, where Morris was a graduate student and Kuhn was his academic adviser, to discuss a paper Morris had written. The conversation grew increasingly heated as they disagreed regarding some fundamental ideas – specifically regarding James Clerk Maxwell's theory of displacement current, and the concept of incommensurability. Morris has claimed that Kuhn eventually threw a cut glass ashtray full of cigarette butts at Morris. Following the incident Morris left Princeton. Morris uses the ashtray as a metaphor for the material reality that Morris believes Kuhn denied, as well what Morris views as Kuhn's intolerance of dissent from his theories.

== Content ==
In the book, Morris argues that Kuhn was a relativist and a philosophical idealist, contrasting his interpretation of Kuhn's views with his own epistemology, drawing on Hilary Putnam and Saul Kripke, which he describes as "investigative realism", based on the belief that there is an objective reality whilst rejecting naïve realism. Morris accepts that investigation of truth involves considerable effort, with no guarantee of reaching the absolute truth, and that knowledge can be attained "through reason, through observation, through investigation, through thought, through science".

The book is written in a style that utilizes images that correspond with many of the arguments in the text. There is artwork on nearly every page that is gathered from all over the world. From discussing Kuhn and Paradigm shift, to interviewing Noam Chomsky, Morris utilizes these varying types of images (what he calls "illustrations") to supplement the information presented.

== Reception ==
In a piece for the Los Angeles Review of Books, Philip Kitcher compared Morris' critique to Samuel Johnson's appeal to the stone regarding George Berkeley's belief in subjective idealism, stating that "Morris has no interest in considering what Kuhn might have had in mind", and rejecting his characterisation of Kuhn as a relativist and an irrealist.
