= In Our Water =

1982 film

- Film poster
- Directed by: Meg Switzgable
- Produced by: Meg Switzgable
- Starring: Frank Kaler; Rita Kaler
- Cinematography: Barry Sonnenfeld; Robert Chappell
- Edited by: Mona Davis
- Production company: Foresight Films
- Distributed by: New Day Films
- Release date: January 6, 1982
- Running time: 60 minutes
- Country: United States
- Language: English

In Our Water is a 1982 American documentary film directed by Meg Switzgable, about a family in South Brunswick, New Jersey, who discover their drinking water is contaminated by a nearby landfill.

== Overview ==
The film focuses on the Frank Kaler family of South Brunswick, New Jersey. Kaler is a housepainter and the family gets their water from their own well, as do their neighbors. The Kalers realize that their water is being contaminated from a nearby landfill and seek to get government to acknowledge and fix the problem. Their attempts to contact local and then the state Department of Environmental Protection are rebuffed. Mr. Kaler eventually goes to Washington DC to testify at Congressional hearings. The film follows the five-year radicalization of Kaler as he realizes what is happening to groundwater and why.

== Reception ==
In a positive review for The Nation, Greg Mitchell wrote "In Our Water is instructive, and it is depressing, but it is also inspiring". Janet Maslin of The New York Times wrote: "Miss Switzgable's film, in addition to providing a swift and distressing lesson about environmental pollution, ably chronicles the ways in which Mr. Kaler's crusade have strengthened his resolve."

== Accolades ==
It was nominated for an Academy Award for Best Documentary Feature. After airing on PBS' Frontline, it was nominated for an Emmy Award.
