= If I Had Known Boys Could Be Sexually Assaulted Too =

2012 educational film

If I Had Known Boys Could Be Sexually Assaulted Too (Chinese: 如果早知道男生也會被性侵) is an educational film about gender equality and male-on-male rape produced in 2012 by the National Academy for Educational Research of Taiwan. It was based on a real-life case. The story follows a male high school student, A-Wei (阿瑋; played by Huang Yao-Wei, 黃耀緯), who is sexually assaulted by Jie-ge (杰哥, lit. 'Brother Jie'; played by Wu Jia-Wei, 伍嘉緯). The film sparked significant online discussion, with many of its lines becoming internet memes.

== Plot ==
Raised by his grandmother, teenager A-Wei (阿瑋) argues with her while playing video games on his laptop and runs away from home. He and his friend Bin-Bin (彬彬) go to an internet café to play Crazy Arcade. At the café, they catch the attention of Jie-ge (杰哥), who waits outside and approaches them. Pretending to be kind, Jie-ge gives them a piece of bread, claiming he "often helps runaways" and purchases food for "hungry, penniless boys", luring them to his home. A-Wei agrees to spend the night at Jie-ge's place with Bin-Bin. Jie-ge thus brings them to a convenience store to buy them snacks, while stealing two 6-packs of beer.

At Jie-ge's home, while Bin-Bin is passed out drunk in the living room, Jie-ge takes A-Wei to his bedroom to watch pornography and forces A-Wei to undress. When A-Wei refuses, Jie-ge beats, sexually assaults, and threatens him. Afterward, Jie-ge continues to harass A-Wei with explicit text messages, causing A-Wei severe emotional and psychological trauma, leading him to skip school for a long time. Later, at a park, A-Wei encounters Shu-Hui (淑惠), a life education volunteer at his school. Hearing her mention terms related to sexual assault triggers an emotional breakdown, catching her attention. Under her guidance, A-Wei opens up about his experience and follows her advice to report the incident to the police, undergo medical examination, initiate legal proceedings, and notify the school for psychological counseling.

== Cast ==
- Huang Yao-Wei (黃耀緯) as A-Wei (阿瑋)
- Wu Jia-Wei (伍嘉緯) as Jie-ge (杰哥)
- Huang Shao-Qi (黃韶麒) as Bin-Bin (彬彬)
- Zhang Chang-Mian (張昌緬) as Teacher Shu-Hui (淑惠老師)
- Chen Wan-Ting (陳婉婷) as Mei-Qi (美琪)
- Zhao Li-Hua (趙莉華) as A-Wei's Grandma
- Pan Yong-Yu (潘永裕) as Little Boy
- Luo Zi-Qing (羅子晴) as Little Girl

== Production ==
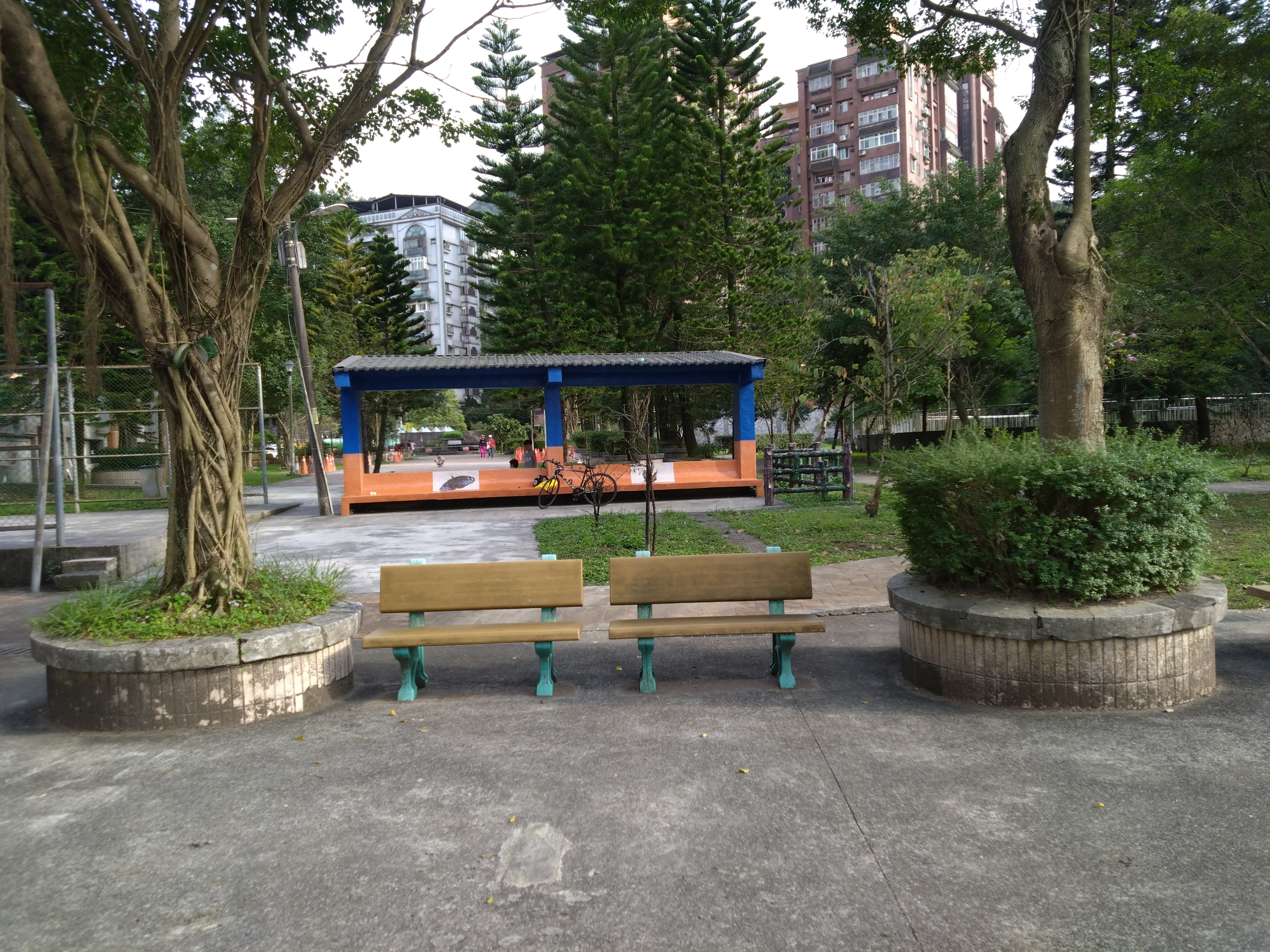
Dingnei No. 15 Park

If I Had Known Boys Could Be Sexually Assaulted Too was commissioned by the Ministry of Education, Taiwan and produced by the National Academy for Educational Research, with Love Transmission Family Media Culture Co., Ltd. (傳愛家族傳播文化事業有限公司) as the production company and Chen Bei-Chuan (陳北川) as the director. Filming took place in Keelung City, including locations such as Nuannuan High School (暖暖高中), Xinfeng Street (新豐街), and Dingnei No. 15 Park (碇內十五號公園). The theme song was written by the Love Transmission Creative Team (傳愛創意小組) and composed by Maluda Yisu (馬路大·以夙), a member of the Love Transmission Family Media Company (傳愛家族傳播公司).

== Reception ==
Uploaded online in 2013 (or 2012), the video sparked heated discussions among netizens due to the realistic acting of Jie-ge and A-Wei. In 2017, it gained popularity on Bilibili, triggering a new wave of attention.

=== Popularity ===
By July 2013, the film had garnered nearly 800,000 views, setting a record for promotional videos by Taiwan government agencies. As of June 2023, it had accumulated over 3 million views on YouTube and was featured in nearly half a page of United Evening News. It is frequently referenced in articles discussing male-on-male sexual assault. Netizens have created various adapted versions of the film. In 2019, it sparked another wave of popularity in mainland China, with phrases like "Let me take a look (讓我看看)", "I’m super brave (我超勇的)", "Deng dua lang (tńg-tuā-lâng)", and "Jie-ge, don't (杰哥不要)" becoming viral internet slang.

=== The development of actors ===
Wu Jia-Wei, who played Jie-ge, and Huang Yao-Wei, who played A-Wei, gained fame from the film. Some people called the phone number from Jie-ge's threatening texts to A-Wei to reach Wu Jia-Wei, and others even visited him to invite him to reprise the role. Huang Yao-Wei noted that his friends often teased him with the film, nearly driving him to anger.

Wu Jia-Wei, later known as Iron Bull (鐵牛), began creating YouTube content and co-founded the group WanGAME (頑GAME) with YouTuber Hua Sen (華森). After WanGAME disbanded,Wu Jia-Wei continued running the YouTube channel IronbullTingTing (鐵牛婷婷) with his wife Tingting (婷婷), and He also has a Bilibili channel .

Huang Yao-Wei, who played A-Wei, became a theater actor, participated in short film productions, and appeared in PTS Original Film – No Anger (公視新創電影－不發火) by the Public Television Service Foundation (公共電視文化事業基金會).

In late 2023, Wu Jia-Wei (Iron Bull), Huang Yao-Wei, and Zhang Chang-Mian (Shu-Hui) reunited to perform in Taiwan's first meme-based musical, Oh!~ Jie-Ge, Don't!! (吼呦～杰哥不要啦！！).

=== Criticism ===
Some criticized If I Had Known Boys Could Be Sexually Assaulted Too for lacking its intended gender equality education. In 2013, Li Jia-Lin (李佳霖), a PhD student at the Institute of Social and Cultural Studies, National Chiao Tung University, and member of "Love, Peace, and Fuck" (愛與和平與幹), wrote a critique arguing that the film fails to serve an educational purpose and reinforces stereotypes of middle-aged men as predators who abduct and assault boys. The critique also suggested the film links AIDS patients with sexual assault victims, suppressing adolescents' sexual expression.
