= Sketches of Frank Gehry =

- Promotional film poster
- Directed by: Sydney Pollack
- Produced by: Ultan Guilfoyle
- Starring: Frank Gehry; Dennis Hopper; Philip Johnson; Edward Ruscha
- Cinematography: George Tiffin
- Edited by: Karen Schmeer
- Music by: Sorman & Nystrom
- Distributed by: Sony Pictures Classics
- Release date: May 12, 2006
- Running time: 86 minutes
- Country: United States
- Language: English

Sketches of Frank Gehry is a 2006 American documentary film directed by Sydney Pollack and produced by Ultan Guilfoyle, about the life and work of the Canadian-American architect Frank Gehry. The film was screened out of competition at the 2006 Cannes Film Festival. Pollack and Gehry had been friends and mutual admirers for years. The film features footage of various Gehry-designed buildings, including Anaheim Ice (the training rink of the Mighty Ducks of Anaheim), the Guggenheim Museum Bilbao, and the Walt Disney Concert Hall. It was the final film to be directed by Sydney Pollack before his death in 2008.

The film includes interviews with other noted figures, including:

- Charles Arnoldi
- Barry Diller
- Michael Eisner
- Hal Foster
- Bob Geldof
- Dennis Hopper
- Charles Jencks
- Philip Johnson
- Thomas Krens (former director of the Solomon R. Guggenheim Museum)
- Herbert Muschamp
- Michael Ovitz
- Robert Rauschenberg
- Edward Ruscha
- Esa-Pekka Salonen
- Julian Schnabel
- Dr Milton Wexler (Gehry's therapist)

The film also discusses work on Gehry's own residence, which was one of the first works that brought him to notoriety.
