= Vernon, Florida (film) =

1981 film by Errol Morris

- DVD release cover
- Directed by: Errol Morris
- Produced by: Errol Morris
- Cinematography: Ned Burgess
- Edited by: Brad Fuller
- Music by: Claude Register
- Distributed by: New Yorker Films
- Release dates: October 8, 1981 (New York Film Festival); January 15, 1982 (New York City)
- Running time: 55 minutes
- Country: United States
- Language: English

Vernon, Florida is a 1981 American documentary film produced and directed by Errol Morris profiling various residents living within the town of Vernon, Florida. Originally titled Nub City, this follow-up to Gates of Heaven initially focused on residents of the Southern town who cut off their own limbs as a way to collect insurance money. After Morris's life was threatened by the subjects of the film, he re-worked Nub City into Vernon, Florida.

== Background and "Nub City" controversy ==
After reading an article about the citizens of Vernon, Florida's propensity for collecting insurance money after losing limbs in accidents, Errol Morris, with financial help from filmmaker Werner Herzog, spent most of a year living in the town. During this time, he tried to interview the residents about these accidents and was met with hostility, even receiving a death threat.

In 1980, following the release of his first film Gates of Heaven, Morris secured funding from WNET and ZDF and returned to Vernon with the intention to make the "Nub City" documentary. After receiving further threats from the residents, including an incident in which someone tried to hit his cinematographer with a truck, Morris decided to abandon the "Nub City" angle, electing instead to produce a documentary about the eccentricities of the town.

== Reception and legacy ==
The film was met with critical acclaim, earning 100% from Rotten Tomatoes.

A review in the January 16, 1982, issue of The New York Times said of Morris' approach to the film

"He lets it all go on a bit too long, but his film is humorous, idiosyncratic and fond. The fancifulness of his subjects is something he appears to appreciate and enjoy."

Various clips of the film would later be included as intro/outro segments for The Heart, She Holler.

== Home media ==
It was released on DVD by MGM in 2005. It is available on Criterion Collection alongside Morris' 1978 film Gates of Heaven.
