= Gates of Heaven =

1978 film by Errol Morris

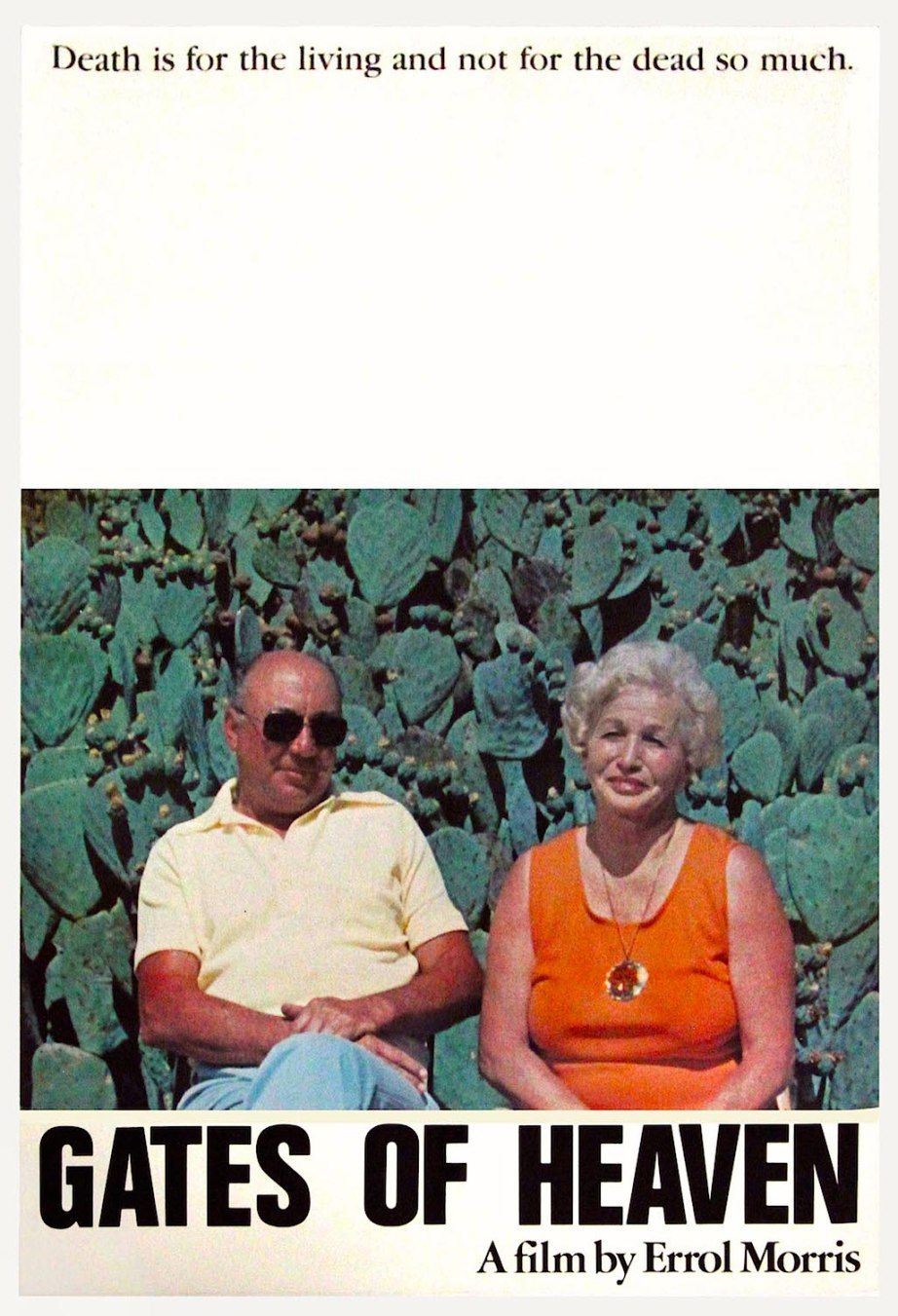
- Theatrical release poster
- Directed by: Errol Morris
- Produced by: Errol Morris
- Starring: Floyd McClure; Cal Harberts; Florence Rasmussen
- Cinematography: Ned Burgess
- Edited by: Errol Morris
- Distributed by: New Yorker Films
- Release date: October 1978 (US)
- Running time: 83 minutes
- Country: United States
- Language: English

Gates of Heaven is a 1978 American independent documentary film produced, directed, and edited by Errol Morris about the pet cemetery business. It was made when Morris was unknown and did much to launch his career.

== Production ==
After a trip to Florida where he tried and failed to make a film about the residents of the town of Vernon, Errol Morris read a San Francisco Chronicle article with the headline: "450 Dead Pets Going to Napa Valley." This story about dead pets being exhumed from one pet cemetery and reburied in another became the basis for Gates of Heaven. For financing Morris borrowed money from family and friends, and the film was shot throughout the spring and summer of 1977, with the total budget estimated at $125,000. Production was difficult at times, with Morris frequently clashing with his cinematographer over the film's visual style. Morris ultimately ended up firing three cinematographers before finally settling on Ned Burgess, with whom he would work again on his second film Vernon, Florida. Morris had a falling out with his sound-woman when one of his subjects, Florence Rasmussen, said "Here today, gone tomorrow, right?" and she said "Wrong." Morris couldn't decide which had offended him more, that his sound-woman had interrupted Rasmussen or that she had said she was "Wrong."

== Release ==
Gates of Heaven had its premiere at the 1978 New York Film Festival, and would play at various other festivals around the world before being picked up for a limited theatrical run by New Yorker Films in 1981.

== Synopsis ==
The film, like Morris's other works, is unnarrated and the stories are told purely through interviews. It is divided into two main sections. The first concerns Floyd "Mac" McClure and his lifelong quest to allow pets to have a graceful burial. McClure's business associates and his competitor, a manager of a rendering plant, are interviewed. Morris reveals that McClure's business has failed. Dividing the two sections is an interview with Florence Rasmussen, an elderly woman whose home overlooked the cemetery. After this, Morris follows the 450 dead pets to the Bubbling Well Pet Memorial Park. This operation is run by John "Cal" Harberts and his two sons, Dan and Phil. This business is far more successful, and continues to operate today, run by Cal's son Dan Harberts. Throughout the film, the speakers touch on philosophical themes, as when McClure says "Death is for the living and not for the dead so much" or a grieving pet owner says "There's your dog, your dog's dead. But where's the thing that made it move? It had to be something, didn't it?"

== Reception and legacy ==
Noted director Werner Herzog pledged that he would eat the shoe he was wearing if Morris's film on this improbable subject was completed and shown in a public theater. When the film was released, Herzog lived up to his wager and the consumption of his footwear was made into the short film Werner Herzog Eats His Shoe. At a seminar at the Telluride Film Festival, Herzog praised Gates of Heaven as "a very, very fine film, and it was made with no money, only guts." Morris recalls showing a rough cut of the movie to Wim Wenders, who called it a masterpiece. It also aired as an episode of P.O.V.

In an interview on the Criterion DVD, Morris recalls that he showed Gates of Heaven to Douglas Sirk at the Berlin Film Festival. Sirk warned Morris that "There's a danger that somebody might find this movie to be ironic." People are often unsure of the film's tone: is it sincere or satirical? Morris says he "loves the absurd" and that "to love the absurdity of people is not to ridicule them, it's to embrace, on some level, how desperate life is for each and every one of us, including me."

Gates of Heaven launched Morris's career and is now considered a classic. In 1991, film critic Roger Ebert named it one of the ten best films ever made in his list for the Sight & Sound poll. Ebert's television partner Gene Siskel shared his enthusiasm for the film. Ebert wrote that the film is an "underground legend," and in 1997 put it in his list of The Great Movies. Ebert wrote that Gates of Heaven "is surrounded by layer upon layer of comedy, pathos, irony, and human nature. I have seen this film perhaps 30 times, and am still not anywhere near the bottom of it: All I know is, it's about a lot more than pet cemeteries."

== Home media ==
The film was initially released on DVD by MGM in 2005. In 2015 The Criterion Collection made it available as part of a new special edition DVD and Blu-Ray that also included Morris's second film Vernon, Florida.
