= Errol Morris =

American film director (born 1948)

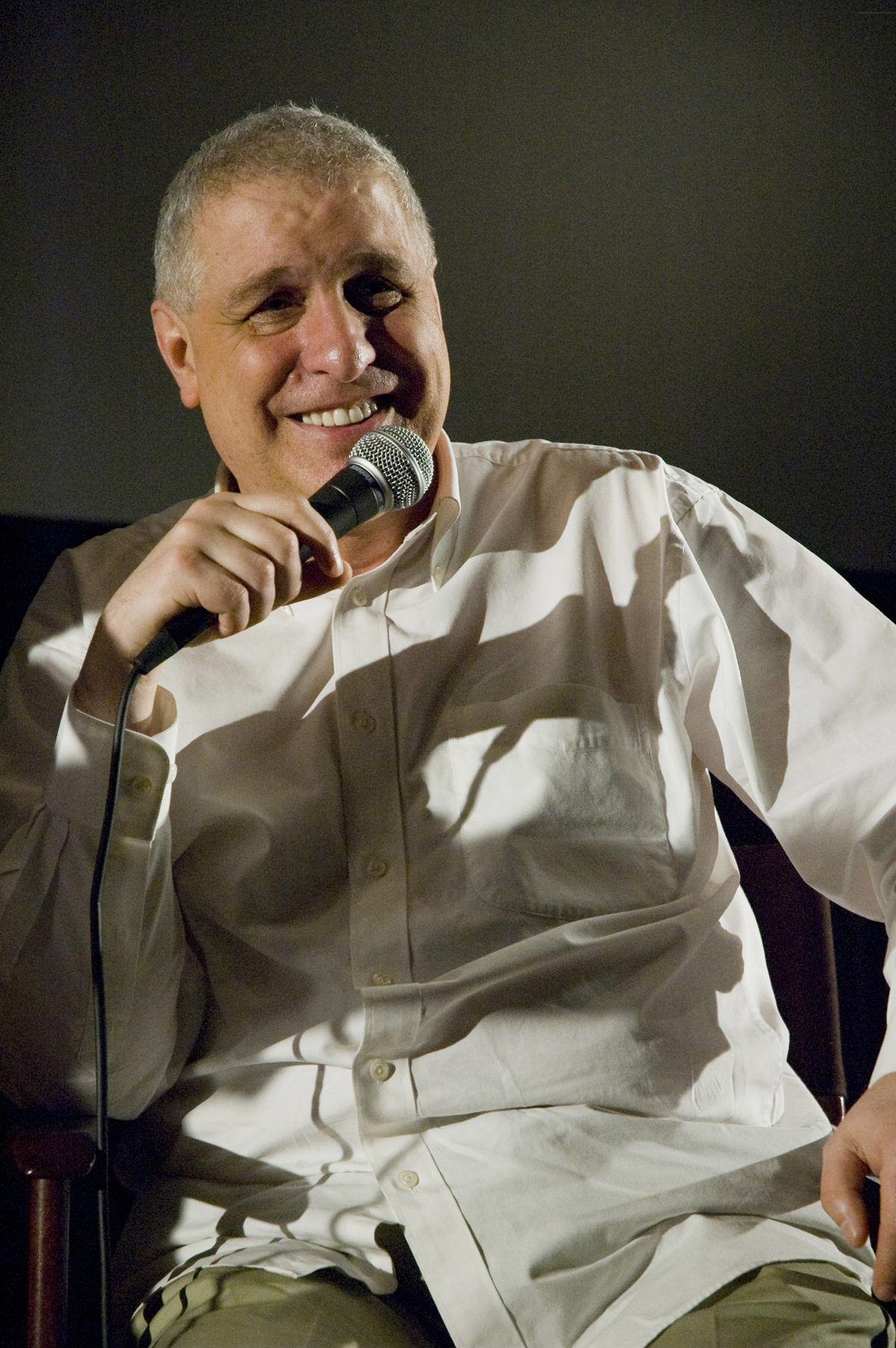
- Morris in Morristown, New Jersey in 2008
- Born: Errol Mark Morris; February 5, 1948 (age 78); Hewlett, New York, U.S.
- Education: University of Wisconsin–Madison (BA)
- Occupation: Film director
- Years active: 1978–present
- Notable work: Gates of Heaven (1978); The Thin Blue Line (1988); Fast, Cheap & Out of Control (1997); The Fog of War (2003)
- Spouse: Julia Sheehan (m. 1984)
- Children: Hamilton Morris
- Website: ErrolMorris.com

Errol Mark Morris (born February 5, 1948) is an American film director known for documentaries that interrogate the epistemology of their subjects. In 2003, his The Fog of War: Eleven Lessons from the Life of Robert S. McNamara won the Academy Award for Best Documentary Feature. His film The Thin Blue Line placed fifth on a Sight & Sound poll of the greatest documentaries ever made. Morris is known for making films about unusual subjects; Fast, Cheap & Out of Control interweaves the stories of an animal trainer, a topiary gardener, a robot scientist, and a naked mole-rat specialist. Morris invented the Interrotron, an idiosyncratic camera set up that allows an interview subject to look directly at the interviewer’s face while also looking straight at the camera.

== Early life and education ==
Errol Mark Morris was born on February 5, 1948, into a Jewish family in Hewlett, New York. His father died when he was two and he was raised by his mother, a piano teacher. He had one older brother, Noel, who was a computer programmer. After being treated for strabismus in childhood, Morris refused to wear an eye patch. As a consequence, he has limited sight in one eye and lacks normal stereoscopic vision.

In the 10th grade, Morris attended The Putney School, a boarding school in Vermont. He began playing the cello, spending a summer in France studying music under the acclaimed Nadia Boulanger, who also taught Morris's future collaborator Philip Glass. Describing Morris as a teenager, Mark Singer wrote that he "read with a passion the 14-odd Oz books, watched a lot of television, and on a regular basis went with a doting but not quite right maiden aunt ('I guess you'd have to say that Aunt Roz was somewhat demented') to Saturday matinées, where he saw such films as This Island Earth and Creature from the Black Lagoon—horror movies that, viewed again 30 years later, still seem scary to him."

=== College ===
Morris attended the University of Wisconsin–Madison, graduating in 1969 with a Bachelor of Arts in history. For a brief time, Morris held small jobs, first as a cable-television salesman, and then as a term-paper writer. His unorthodox approach to applying for graduate school included "trying to get accepted at different graduate schools just by showing up on their doorstep." Having unsuccessfully approached both the University of Oxford and Harvard University, Morris was able to talk his way into Princeton University, where he began studying the history of science, a topic in which he had "absolutely no background." His concentration was in the history of physics, and he was bored and unsuccessful in the prerequisite physics classes he had to take. This, together with his antagonistic relationship with his advisor Thomas Kuhn ('You won't even look through my telescope.' And his response was 'Errol, it's not a telescope, it's a kaleidoscope.') ensured that his stay at Princeton would be short.

Morris left Princeton in 1972, enrolling at Berkeley as a doctoral student in philosophy. At Berkeley, he once again found that he was not well-suited to his subject. "Berkeley was just a world of pedants. It was truly shocking. I spent two or three years in the philosophy program. I have very bad feelings about it", he later said.

== Career ==
After leaving UC Berkeley, he became a regular at the Pacific Film Archive. As Tom Luddy, the director of the archive at the time, later remembered: "He was a film noir nut. He claimed we weren't showing the real film noir. So I challenged him to write the program notes. Then, there was his habit of sneaking into the films and denying that he was sneaking in. I told him if he was sneaking in he should at least admit he was doing it."

=== Unfinished project on Ed Gein ===
Inspired by Hitchcock's Psycho, Morris visited Plainfield, Wisconsin in 1975, where he conducted multiple interviews with Ed Gein, the infamous body snatcher who resided at Mendota State Hospital in Madison. He later made plans with German film director Werner Herzog, whom Tom Luddy had introduced to Morris, to return in the summer of 1975 to secretly open the grave of Gein's mother to test their theory that Gein himself had already dug her up. Herzog arrived on schedule, but Morris had second thoughts and was not there. Herzog did not open the grave. Morris later returned to Plainfield, this time staying for almost a year, conducting hundreds of hours of interviews. Despite this, his plans to either write a book or make a film (which he would call Digging up the Past) were left unfinished at the time. In an October 2023 interview with Letterboxd, Morris mentioned that he has since returned to the project, saying "I started rewatching Psycho, because I'm making a movie about Ed Gein."

In the fall of 1976, Herzog visited Plainfield again, this time to shoot part of his film Stroszek.

=== First films ===
Morris accepted $2,000 from Herzog and used it to take a trip to Vernon, Florida. Vernon was nicknamed "Nub City" because its residents supposedly participated in a particularly gruesome form of insurance fraud in which they deliberately amputated a limb to collect the insurance money. Morris's second documentary was about the town and bore its name, although it made no mention of Vernon as "Nub City", but instead explored other idiosyncrasies of the town's residents. Morris made this omission because he received death threats while doing research; the town's residents were afraid that Morris would reveal their secret.

After spending two weeks in Vernon, Morris returned to Berkeley and began working on a script for a work of fiction that he called Nub City. After a few unproductive months, he happened upon a headline in the San Francisco Chronicle that read, "450 Dead Pets Going to Napa Valley." Morris left for Napa Valley and began working on the film that would become his first feature, Gates of Heaven, which premiered in 1978. Herzog had said he would eat his shoe if Morris completed the documentary. After the film premiered, Herzog publicly followed through on the bet by cooking and eating his shoe, which was documented in the short film Werner Herzog Eats His Shoe by Les Blank.

Gates of Heaven was given a limited release in the spring of 1981. Roger Ebert was a champion of the film, including it on his ballot in the 1992 Sight & Sound critics' poll. Morris returned to Vernon in 1979 and again in 1980, renting a house in town and conducting interviews with the town's citizens. Vernon, Florida premiered at the 1981 New York Film Festival. Newsweek called it, "a film as odd and mysterious as its subjects, and quite unforgettable." The film, like Gates of Heaven, suffered from poor distribution. It was released on video in 1987, and DVD in 2005.

After finishing Vernon, Florida, Morris tried to get funding for a variety of projects. The Road story was about an interstate highway in Minnesota; one project was about Robert Golka, the creator of laser-induced fireballs in Utah; and another story was about Centralia, Pennsylvania, the coal town in which an inextinguishable subterranean fire ignited in 1962. He eventually got funding in 1983 to write a script about John and Jim Pardue, Missouri bank robbers who had killed their father and grandmother and robbed five banks. Morris's pitch went, "The great bank-robbery sprees always take place at a time when something is going wrong in the country. Bonnie and Clyde were apolitical, but it's impossible to imagine them without the Depression as a backdrop. The Pardue brothers were apolitical, but it's impossible to imagine them without Vietnam." Morris wanted Tom Waits and Mickey Rourke to play the brothers, and he wrote the script, but the project eventually failed. Morris worked on writing scripts for various other projects, including a pair of ill-fated Stephen King adaptations.

In 1984, Morris married Julia Sheehan, whom he had met in Wisconsin while researching Ed Gein and other serial killers. He would later recall an early conversation with Julia: "I was talking to a mass murderer but I was thinking of you," he said, and instantly regretted it, afraid that it might not have sounded as affectionate as he had wished. But Julia was actually flattered: "I thought, really, that was one of the nicest things anyone ever said to me. It was hard to go out with other guys after that."

=== The Thin Blue Line ===
In 1985, Morris became interested in Dr. James Grigson, a psychiatrist in Dallas. Under Texas law, the death penalty can only be issued if the jury is convinced that the defendant is not only guilty, but will commit further violent crimes in the future if he is not put to death. Grigson had spent 15 years testifying for such cases, and he almost invariably gave the same damning testimony, often saying that it is "one hundred per cent certain" that the defendant would kill again. This led to Grigson being nicknamed "Dr. Death." Through Grigson, Morris met the subject of his next film, 36-year-old Randall Dale Adams.

Adams was serving a life sentence that had been commuted from a death sentence on a legal technicality for the 1976 murder of Robert Wood, a Dallas police officer. Adams told Morris that he had been framed, and that David Harris, who was present at the time of the murder and was the principal witness for the prosecution, had in fact killed Wood. Morris began researching the case because it related to Dr. Grigson. He was at first unconvinced of Adams's innocence. After reading the transcripts of the trial and meeting David Harris at a bar, however, Morris was no longer so sure.

At the time, Morris had been making a living as a private investigator for a well-known private detective agency that specialized in Wall Street cases. Bringing together his talents as an investigator and his obsessions with murder, narration, and epistemology, Morris went to work on the case in earnest. Unedited interviews in which the prosecution's witnesses systematically contradicted themselves were used as testimony in Adams's 1986 habeas corpus hearing to determine if he would receive a new trial. David Harris famously confessed, in a roundabout manner, to killing Wood.

Although Adams was finally found innocent after years of being processed by the legal system, the judge in the habeas corpus hearing officially stated that, "much could be said about those videotape interviews, but nothing that would have any bearing on the matter before this court." Regardless, The Thin Blue Line, as Morris's film would be called, was popularly accepted as the main force behind getting its subject, Randall Adams, out of prison. As Morris said of the film, "The Thin Blue Line is two movies grafted together. On one simple level is the question, Did he do it, or didn't he? And on another level, The Thin Blue Line, properly considered, is an essay on false history. A whole group of people, literally everyone, believed a version of the world that was entirely wrong, and my accidental investigation of the story provided a different version of what happened."

The Thin Blue Line ranks among the most critically acclaimed documentaries ever made. According to a survey by The Washington Post, the film made dozens of critics' top ten lists for 1988, more than any other film that year. It won the documentary of the year award from both the New York Film Critics Circle and the National Society of Film Critics. Despite its widespread acclaim, it was not nominated for an Oscar, which created a small scandal regarding the nomination practices of the academy. The academy cited the film's genre of "non-fiction", arguing that it was not actually a documentary. It was the first of Morris's films to be scored by Philip Glass.

=== A Brief History of Time and Fast, Cheap & Out of Control ===
Morris wanted to make a film about Albert Einstein's brain and approached Amblin Entertainment about it. Gordon Freedman had acquired the rights to Stephen Hawking's bestseller A Brief History of Time and Steven Spielberg suggested Morris direct it. After reading Hawking's book, Morris agreed to direct a documentary adaptation of it, having studied the philosophy of science at Princeton. Morris's film A Brief History of Time is less an adaptation of Hawking's book than a portrait of the scientist. It combines interviews with Hawking, his colleagues and his family with computer animations and clips from movies like Disney's The Black Hole. Morris said he was "very moved by Hawking as a man", calling him "immensely likable, perverse, funny...and yes, he's a genius."

Morris's Fast, Cheap & Out of Control interweaves interviews with a wild animal trainer, a topiary gardener, a robot scientist and a naked mole rat specialist with stock footage, cartoons and clips from film serials. Roger Ebert said of it, "If I had to describe it, I'd say it's about people who are trying to control things - to take upon themselves the mantle of God." Morris agreed there was a "Frankenstein element", adding "They're all involved in some very odd inquiry about life. It sounds horribly pretentious laid out that way, but there's something mysterious in each of the stories, something melancholy as well as funny. And there's an edge of mortality. For the end of the movie I showed the gardener clipping the top of his camel, clipping in a heavenly light, and then walking away in the rain. You know that this garden is not going to last much longer than the gardener's lifetime." The film was scored by Caleb Sampson of the Alloy Orchestra and photographed by Robert Richardson. Morris dedicated the film to his mother and stepfather, who had recently died. It was named by several critics as one of the best films of 1997.

In 2002, Morris was commissioned to make a short film for the 75th Academy Awards. He was hired based on his advertising resume, not his career as a director of feature-length documentaries. Those interviewed ranged from Laura Bush to Iggy Pop to Kenneth Arrow to Morris's 15-year-old son Hamilton. Morris was nominated for an Emmy for this short film. He considered editing this footage into a feature-length film, focusing on Donald Trump discussing Citizen Kane (this segment was later released on the second issue of Wholphin). Morris went on to make a second short for the 79th Academy Awards in 2007, this time interviewing the various nominees and asking them about their Oscar experiences.

=== The Fog of War and later films ===
In 2003, Morris won the Oscar for Best Documentary for The Fog of War, a film about the career of Robert S. McNamara, the Secretary of Defense during the Vietnam War under Presidents John F. Kennedy and Lyndon B. Johnson. In the haunting opening about McNamara's relationship with U.S. General Curtis LeMay during World War II, Morris brings out complexities in the character of McNamara, which shaped McNamara's positions in the Cuban Missile Crisis and the Vietnam War. Like his earlier documentary, The Thin Blue Line, The Fog of War included extensive use of re-enactments, a technique which many had believed was inappropriate for documentaries prior to his Oscar win.

In early 2010, a new Morris documentary was submitted to several film festivals, including Toronto International Film Festival, Cannes Film Festival, and Telluride Film Festival. The film, Tabloid, features interviews with Joyce McKinney, a former Miss Wyoming, who was convicted in absentia for the kidnap and indecent assault of a Mormon missionary in England during 1977.

Subsequently, Morris has made documentaries such as The Unknown Known (2013), American Dharma (2018), and The Pigeon Tunnel (2023), revolving around interviews conducted with Donald Rumsfeld, Steve Bannon, and John le Carré, respectively.

=== Commercials ===
Although Morris has achieved fame as a documentary filmmaker, he is also an accomplished director of television commercials. In 2002, Morris directed a series of television ads for Apple Computer as part of a popular "Switch" campaign. The commercials featured ex-Windows users discussing their various bad experiences that motivated their own personal switches to Macintosh. One commercial in the series, starring Ellen Feiss, a high-schooler friend of his son Hamilton Morris, became an Internet meme. Morris has directed hundreds of commercials for various companies and products, including Adidas, AIG, Cisco Systems, Citibank, Kimberly-Clark's Depend brand, Levi's, Miller High Life, Nike, PBS, The Quaker Oats Company, Southern Comfort, EA Sports, Toyota and Volkswagen. Many of these commercials are available on his website.

In July 2004, Morris directed another series of commercials in the style of the "Switch" ads. This campaign featured Republicans who voted for Bush in the 2000 election giving their personal reasons for voting for Kerry in 2004. Upon completing more than 50 commercials, Morris had difficulty getting them on the air. Eventually, the liberal advocacy group MoveOn PAC paid to air a few of the commercials. Morris also wrote an editorial for The New York Times discussing the commercials and Kerry's losing campaign.

In late 2004, Morris directed a series of noteworthy commercials for Sharp Electronics. The commercials enigmatically depicted various scenes from what appeared to be a short narrative that climaxed with a car crashing into a swimming pool. Each commercial showed a slightly different perspective on the events, and each ended with a cryptic weblink. The weblink was to a fake webpage advertising a prize offered to anyone who could discover the secret location of some valuable urns. It was in fact an alternate reality game. The original commercials can be found on Morris's website.

Morris directed a series of commercials for Reebok that featured six prominent National Football League (NFL) players. The 30-second promotional videos were aired during the 2006 NFL season.

In 2013, Morris stated that he has made around 1,000 commercials during his career. Since then he has continued in the field, including a 2019 campaign for Chipotle.

In 2015, Morris made commercials for medical technology firm Theranos, and interviewed its founder, Elizabeth Holmes. After the company fell in disgrace, Morris was criticized by The Telegraph for seeming "captivated" by Holmes, and for contributing to Holmes' mythical persona as a visionary. In a 2019 New Yorker interview, Morris reflected, "To me, what really is interesting about Elizabeth [Holmes] ... did she really see herself as a fraud? Was it calculation? I have a hard time squaring that with my own experience. Could I have been self-deceived, delusional? You betcha. I'm no different than the next guy. I'd like to think I'm a little different. But I'm still fascinated by her." After the release of the documentary You Can See Everything in 2026, Morris expressed an interest in releasing an interview he had previously shot with Holmes.

=== Writings and documentary shorts ===
Morris has also written long-form journalism, exploring different areas of interest and published on The New York Times website. A collection of these essays, titled Believing is Seeing: Observations on the Mysteries of Photography, was published by Penguin Press on September 1, 2011. In November 2011, Morris premiered a documentary short titled "The Umbrella Man"—featuring Josiah "Tink" Thompson—about the Kennedy assassination on The New York Times website.

In 2012, Morris published his second book, A Wilderness of Error: The Trials of Jeffrey MacDonald, about Jeffrey MacDonald, the Green Beret physician convicted of killing his wife and two daughters on February 17, 1970. Morris first became interested in the case in the early 1990s and believes that MacDonald is not guilty after undertaking extensive research. Morris explained in a July 2013 interview, prior to the reopening of the case: "What happened here is wrong. It's wrong to convict a man under these circumstances. And if I can help correct that, I will be a happy camper." He now states that he does not believe that Macdonald is guilty, but thinks it possible that Macdonald is guilty.

== Style and legacy ==
To conduct interviews, Morris invented a machine, called the Interrotron, which allows the interviewer and his subject to make eye-contact with each other while both staring through the camera lens itself. He explains the device as follows:

Teleprompters are used to project an image on a two-way mirror. Politicians and newscasters use them so that they can read text and look into the lens of the camera at the same time. What interests me is that nobody thought of using them for anything other than to display text: read a speech or read the news and look into the lens of the camera. I changed that. I put my face on the Teleprompter or, strictly speaking, my live video image. For the first time, I could be talking to someone, and they could be talking to me and at the same time looking directly into the lens of the camera. Now, there was no looking off slightly to the side. No more faux first person. This was the true first person.

Author Marsha McCreadie, in her book Documentary Superstars: How Today's Filmmakers Are Reinventing the Form, had paired Morris with Werner Herzog as practitioners and visionaries in their approach in documentary filmmaking.

Morris uses narrative elements within his films. These include but are not limited to: stylized lighting, musical score, and re-enactment. The use of these elements is rejected by many documentary filmmakers who followed the cinema vérité style of the previous generations. Cinema vérité is characterized by its rejection of artistic additions to documentary film. While Morris faced backlash from many of the older-era filmmakers, his style has been embraced by the younger generations of filmmakers, as the use of re-enactment is present in many contemporary documentary films.

Morris advocates the reflexive style of documentary filmmaking. In Bill Nichols's book Introduction to Documentary he states that reflexive documentary "[speaks] not only about the historical world but about the problems and issues of representing it as well." Morris uses his films not only to portray social issues and non-fiction events but also to comment on the reliability of documentary making itself.

His style has been spoofed in the mockumentary series Documentary Now.

Even when interviewing controversial figures, Morris does not generally believe in adversarial interviews:

I don't really believe in adversarial interviews. I don't think you learn very much. You create a theater, a gladiatorial theater, which may be satisfying to an audience, but if the goal is to learn something that you don't know, that's not the way to go about doing it. In fact, it's the way to destroy the possibility of ever hearing anything interesting or new. .... the most interesting and most revealing comments have come not as a result of a question at all, but having set up a situation where people actually want to talk to you, and want to reveal something to you.

== Filmography ==
=== Feature films ===
- Gates of Heaven (1978)
- Vernon, Florida (1981)
- The Thin Blue Line (1988)
- The Dark Wind (1991), fiction movie
- A Brief History of Time (1991)
- Fast, Cheap & Out of Control (1997)
- Mr. Death: The Rise and Fall of Fred A. Leuchter, Jr. (1999)
- The Fog of War: Eleven Lessons from the Life of Robert S. McNamara (2003)
- Standard Operating Procedure (2008)
- Tabloid (2010)
- The Act of Killing (executive producer) (2012)
- The Unknown Known (2013)
- The Look of Silence (executive producer) (2014)
- Happy Father's Day (video) (2015)
- Uncle Nick (executive producer) (2015)
- The B-Side: Elsa Dorfman's Portrait Photography (2016)
- National Bird (executive producer) (2016)
- American Dharma (2018)
- Enemies of the State (executive producer) (2020)
- My Psychedelic Love Story (2020)
- The Pigeon Tunnel (2023)
- Tune Out the Noise (2024)
- Separated (2024)
- CHAOS: The Manson Murders (2025)

=== Short films ===
- Survivors (2008)
- They Were There (Documentary short) (2011)
- El Wingador (Documentary short) (2012)
- Three Short Films About Peace (2014)
- Leymah Gbowee: The Dream (Documentary short) (2014)

=== Television ===
- Errol Morris Interrotron Stories: Digging Up the Past (TV miniseries documentary) (1995)
- First Person (TV series documentary) (17 episodes) (2000)
- Op-Docs (TV series documentary trilogy)
  - The Umbrella Man about Umbrella man (JFK assassination) (2011)
  - November 22, 1963 (2013)
  - A Demon in the Freezer (2016)
- P.O.V. (executive producer) (2014–2016)
- It's Not Crazy, It's Sports (TV documentary series) (2015)
  - The Subterranean Stadium (TV movie) (2015)
  - The Streaker (TV movie) (2015)
  - The Heist (TV movie) (2015)
  - Most Valuable Whatever (TV movie) (2015)
  - Chrome (TV movie) (2015)
  - Being Mr. Met (TV movie) (2015)
- Zillow Hiram's Home (TV movie) (2016)
- Wormwood (miniseries) (2017)
- A Wilderness of Error (docuseries on FX) (2020)

== Accolades ==
- Gates of Heaven (1978) was long featured on Roger Ebert's list of the ten greatest films ever made.
- Golden Horse for Best Foreign Film at the Taiwan International Film Festival for The Thin Blue Line (1988)
- New York Film Critics Circle and the National Society of Film Critics Best Documentary for The Thin Blue Line (1988)
- Washington Post Best Film of the Year for The Thin Blue Line (1988)
- Edgar Award for Best Motion Picture, from the Mystery Writers of America, for The Thin Blue Line (1989)
- Guggenheim Fellowship (1989)
- MacArthur Fellowship (1989)
- Emmy for Best Commercial for PBS commercial "Photobooth" (2001)
- In December 2001, the United States' National Film Preservation Foundation announced that Morris's The Thin Blue Line would be one of the 25 films selected that year for preservation in the National Film Registry at the Library of Congress, bringing the total at the time to 325.
- 2002 International Documentary Association list of the 20 all-time best documentaries: The Thin Blue Line (#2), Fast, Cheap & Out of Control (#14)
- Best Documentary of the Year awards for The Fog of War (2003): the National Board of Review, the Los Angeles Film Critics Association, the Chicago Film Critics, and the Washington D.C. Area Film Critics.
- In 2003, The Guardian put him seventh in its list of the world's 40 best active directors.
- Academy Award for Documentary Feature The Fog of War (2004)
- Fellow of the American Academy of Arts and Sciences (2007)
- Jury Grand Prix Silver Bear at the 2008 Berlin International Film Festival for Standard Operating Procedure
- Columbia Journalism Award (2013)
- In 2019, The Fog of War was selected by the Library of Congress for preservation in the National Film Registry for being "culturally, historically, or aesthetically significant".

=== Honorary degrees ===
- Middlebury College, Hon. D.F.A. (2010)
- Brandeis University, Hon. D.H.L. (2011)
- University of Wisconsin–Madison, Hon. D.H.L. (2013)

== Bibliography ==
=== Books ===
- Morris, Errol (2011). Believing Is Seeing: Observations on the Mysteries of Photography. New York: Penguin Press. ISBN 978-0143124252.
- A Wilderness of Error: The Trials of Jeffrey MacDonald (Penguin Press, September 4, 2012)
- The Ashtray (Or the Man Who Denied Reality) (University of Chicago Press, 2018)

=== Articles ===
- Morris, Errol (April 20, 2015). "What photography can't prove". United States. Crime. Time. Vol. 185, no. 14 (South Pacific ed.). p. 23.
