= Robert Chappell =

American cinematographer, writer, and director

Robert Chappell (born 1952) is an American cinematographer, writer, and director. His cinematography credits include The Thin Blue Line, The Fog of War, In Our Water, and Standard Operating Procedure.
