= Rape of males =

Rape committed against men and boys

Some victims of rape or other sexual violence incidents are male. Historically, rape was thought to be, and defined as, a crime committed solely against females. This belief is still held in some parts of the world, but rape of males is now commonly criminalized and has been subject to more discussion than in the past.

Males are far less likely to report sexual abuse than females. Rape of males is still considered a taboo subject in society and male victims tend to deny their victimization. Community and service providers often react differently to male victims based on their sexual orientation and the gender of their perpetrators.

It may be difficult for male victims to report a sexual assault they experienced, especially in a society with a strong masculine custom. They might be afraid that people will doubt their sexual orientation and label them homosexual, especially if raped by a male, or that they may be seen as un-masculine because they were a victim, and therefore many statistics underestimate how many males are raped due to their unwillingness to report sexual assault and rape. Most of the time, male victims try to hide and deny their victimization, similar to female victims, unless they have serious physical injuries. Eventually, the male victims may be very vague in explaining their injuries when they are seeking medical or mental health services.

== Research and statistics ==
=== General ===
Research about male-victim rape had only just begun to appear by 1980, focusing mostly on male children. The studies of sexual assault in correctional facilities focusing specifically on the consequences of this kind of rape were available in the early 1980s, but nothing was available during the previous years. Most of the literature regarding rape and sexual assault focuses on female victims.

Only recently have some other forms of sexual violence against men been considered. In the 2010–2012 National Intimate Partner and Sexual Violence Survey in Atlanta, Georgia (and a prior edition of this study completed in 2010), the Centers for Disease Control (CDC) measured a category of sexual violence called "being made to penetrate" which captures instances in which victims were forced to or attempt to sexually penetrate someone (of either sex), either by physical force or coercion, or when the victim was intoxicated or otherwise unable to consent. The CDC found in the 2012 data that 1.715 million (up from 1.267 million in 2010) reported being "made to penetrate" another person in the preceding 12 months, similar to the 1.473 million (2010: 1.270 million) women who reported being raped in the same time period. The definitions of rape and "made to penetrate" in the CDC study were worded with extremely similar language.

=== Male-on-male rape ===
Male-on-male rape has been heavily stigmatized. According to psychologist Sarah Crome, fewer than 1 in 10 male-on-male rapes are reported. As a group, male rape victims reported a lack of services and support, and legal systems are often ill-equipped to deal with this type of crime. In the United Kingdom, epidemiological studies have suggested that the rate of male rape is higher in gay and college communities.

Several studies argue that male-on-male prisoner rape, as well as female-on-female prisoner rape, are common types of rape which go unreported even more frequently than rape in the general population. (Note: Human Rights Watch No Escape: Male Rape In U.S. Prisons. Part VII. Anomaly or Epidemic: The Incidence of Prisoner-on-Prisoner Rape.; estimates that 100,000–140,000 violent male-male rapes occur in U.S. prisons annually; compare with FBI statistics that estimated 90,000 violent male-female rapes occur annually.) (Note: Robert W. Dumond, "Ignominious Victims: Effective Treatment of Male Sexual Assault in Prison," August 15, 1995, p. 2; states that "evidence suggests that [male-male sexual assault in prison] may a staggering problem"). Quoted in Mariner J (17 April 2001). No escape: male rape in U.S. prisons. Human Rights Watch. p. 370. ISBN 978-1-56432-258-6.) (Note: Struckman-Johnson C, Struckman-Johnson D (2006). "A Comparison of Sexual Coercion Experiences Reported by Men and Women in Prison". Journal of Interpersonal Violence. 21 (12): 1591–1615. doi:10.1177/0886260506294240. ISSN 0886-2605. PMID 17065656. S2CID 27639359.; reports that "Greater percentages of men (70%) than women (29%) reported that their incident resulted in oral, vaginal, or anal sex. More men (54%) than women (28%) reported an incident that was classified as rape.") The rape of men by men has been documented as a weapon of terror in warfare (see also War rape). In the case of the Syrian Civil War (2011–2024), the male detainees experienced sexual abuse such as being forced to sit on a broken glass bottle, getting their genitals tied to a heavy bag of water, or being forced to watch the rape of another detainee by the officials.

=== Female-on-male rape ===
Female-on-male rape is under-researched compared to other forms of sexual violence. Statistics on the prevalence of female-on-male sexual violence, and its psychological effects are inconsistent across studies. One study (Hannon et al.) found 23.4% of women and 10.5% of men reported they were raped, while 6.6% of women and 10.5% of men reported they were victims of attempted rape. A 2016/2017 study by the Centers for Disease Control and Prevention (CDC) found that 1 in 9 men (10.7%) reported being made to penetrate at some point in their lives (up from 4.8% in 2010). The surveys also found that male victims often reported only female perpetrators in instances of being made to penetrate (2016/17: 69.6%, 2010: 79.2%), sexual coercion (2016/17: 71.7%, 2010: 83.6%), and unwanted sexual contact (2016/17: 47.5%, 2010: 53.1%). Among male victims who were raped by being penetrated, 76.8% reported only male perpetrators (down from 93.3% in the previous study published in 2010). A 2008 study of 98 men interviewed on the United States National Crime Victimization Survey found that nearly half of the men (46%) who reported some form of sexual victimization were victimized by women.

Regarding female-on-male sexual misconduct, the US Dept. of Justice reports in its opening statement (page 5): "An estimated 4.4% of prison inmates and 3.1% of jail inmates reported experiencing one or more incidents of sexual victimization by another inmate or facility staff in the past 12 months or since admission to the facility, if less than 12 months." Regarding female-on-male sexual misconduct (page 25) it states: "Among the 39,121 male prison inmates who had been victims of staff sexual misconduct, 69% reported sexual activity with female staff; an additional 16% reported sexual activity with both female and male staff (table 18)." and "Nearly two-thirds of the male jail inmates who had been victimized said the staff perpetrator was female (64%)."

Male victims of sexual abuse by females often face social, political, and legal double standards. One case involved James Landrith, who was raped by being forced to penetrate a female acquaintance in a hotel room while incapacitated from drinking, while his rapist cited the fact that she was pregnant to advise him not to struggle, as it might hurt the baby.

Several widely publicized cases of female-on-male statutory rape in the United States involved school teachers having illegal sex with their underage students (see Mary Kay Letourneau and Debra Lafave). There have also been cases where an underage male who was a victim of statutory rape, was ordered by a judge to pay child support after the woman became pregnant (see Hermesmann v. Seyer).

== Myths regarding male victims of rape ==
=== Males are not vulnerable ===
By masculine gender socialization, it is thought that males, even younger males, cannot be victims of rape, nor even that they are vulnerable. In some societies, it is considered shameful and unmanly if a male child cries, because the male stereotype depicts males as being able to protect themselves, which may not always be the case. Young boys may be weaker and vulnerable to perpetrators, who are usually stronger. The perpetrators can use whatever they have to abuse the child, including money or other bribes. An adult male may also be helpless to fight back, or fearful of doing so.

=== Males always want sex ===
A common societal belief is that a male must be aroused if he gets an erection or has an orgasm, therefore that means that he is willing to have sex. Roy J. Levin and Willy Van Berlo wrote in an article in the Journal of Clinical Forensic Medicine that slight genital stimulation or stress can create erections "even though no specific sexual stimulation is present". An erection does not mean that the male consents to sex. Males can get erections even in traumatic or painful sexual situations, and this does not indicate consent.

Much like female erectile response, male erectile response is involuntary, meaning that a man does not need to be aroused for his penis to become erect; mechanical stimulation is all that is necessary. Arousal and stimulation are distinct things. Stimulation is a physical response to a stimulus. Men can be physically stimulated without feeling aroused and thus causing an erection. Men can be scared and intimidated into an erection, especially if the person is older or has an authority.

=== Traumatization ===
One notion is that males are less traumatized by the abuse experience than females are; this includes the belief that males are less negatively affected. Studies show that the long-term effects are damaging for either sex and males may especially be more damaged by social stigma and disbelief of their victimization. It is noted by Eogan and Richardson that male victims tend to feel more intense anger than female victims, while both go through similar feelings of distress after the rape. Frazier (1993) studied 74 male and 1,380 female rape victims. She found that the depression and hostility are more profound on male victims immediately post-rape than on female victims.

Trauma recovery counselor Stephanie Baird says men who experience sexual attention as children often explain it to themselves as "I'm a stud, I got laid by ...". Baird explains that they do this in order to feel as if they had some power and say. Carpenter (2009, citing Mezey, 1987) finds that the "male coping strategy characterized by denial and control renders them more prone to later psychiatric problems and reduces the likelihood of seeking help".

=== Sexual orientation ===
Henry Leak, the chairman of the Survivors organization, stated that rape of males, as with females, has more to do with power than sexuality, and does not only happen inside the homosexual community. Sexual orientation is a complex issue, and the majority of male perpetrators who seek out boys are not homosexual.

Male sexual assault victims often fear being seen as weak or gay, or believe that their assault may be due to their appearance being effeminate so as to attract other males. They may also begin to question their own sexuality. Experts do not believe that premature sexual experiences play a significant role in later sexual orientation. Research by Jane Gilgun, Judith Becker and John Hunter states that while many perpetrators may have experienced sexual abuse of their own, most sexual assault victims will not go on to become adolescent perpetrators. However, gay and bisexual men can be victims of rape with "13.2% of bisexual men and 11.6% of gay men reporting a history of rape in adulthood".

== During armed conflict ==
Rape of males during wartime has been reported as prevalent in some parts of the world, such as the Republic of the Congo, which suffered a civil war in 1997.

Across Africa, men who are raped often face social stigmatization and being ridiculed for being "weak" and failing to prevent the rape. They may also be accused of homosexuality (which is illegal in many countries of the region). For example, when some male refugees from the Congo sought treatment in Uganda, they were prosecuted for homosexuality, The Economist reported in 2012.

In northern Uganda, there have been ongoing attacks by rebel groups against the government forces. During these conflicts, civilian men have often been attacked, kidnapped, raped and forced to fight for the rebel groups. Victims of rape often face serious physical, emotional, and psychological trauma as a result of their experience.

== Effects ==
=== Physical effects ===
Sexual abuse results in severe emotional and often physical trauma. Among sexual assault victims over 18, 31.5% of females and 16.1% of males said that they incurred non-genital injuries from the assault.

Male victims received more ancillary injuries and were more likely to be threatened with a weapon by the perpetrator. The symptoms and injuries most frequently noted are tension headaches, ulcers, nausea, colitis, abrasions to the throat, black eyes and broken bones. The study by Stermac and colleagues (2004) noted that 45% of male victims who went to a hospital sexual assault centre had some type of physical injury (25% soft tissue injury, 20% lacerations).

The data from hospital emergency rooms show that male rape victims are more likely to have non-genital injuries than females, and that they are more likely to neglect seeking medical attention if the injuries are not significant. Hodge and Canter (1998) report that homosexual male victims are more likely to sustain serious injuries than heterosexual male victims. Sometimes victims become infected by a sexually transmitted disease as the result of rape, but it is infrequent and includes only a small portion of male victims.

=== Psychological effects ===
Rape victims, males and females, may find it difficult to report the sexual assault against them. There is a myth that a male sexual assault victim will become a perpetrator themselves. This myth is very damaging to victims, both to their mental states and to how people treat them. Elizabeth Donovan, a psychotherapist, stated that males have the added burden of facing a society that does not believe that rape can happen to them at all. The social stigmatization of male victims is also damaging and has been described as 'secondary victimization'. It has been linked to the under-reporting of rape and post-rape trauma; male victims are also susceptible to post-traumatic stress disorder. Some studies have found that some victims chose not to report their assaults as they fear being labelled as a 'closet homosexual', bisexual, or as promiscuous.

Regarding the blaming of victims of rape, researchers, in 1993, conducted an experiment and found that a statistically significant proportion of males tend to blame the victim, even when the rape victim was a male.

==== Long-term effects ====
Compared to men who have not been sexually assaulted, men who were sexually assaulted before age 18 have a greater risk of having mental health problems, including symptoms of post-traumatic stress disorder and depression; alcoholism and drug abuse; suicidal thoughts and suicide attempts; problems in intimate relationships; and underachievement at school and at work.

Because of gender expectations, being a male child victim of sexual abuse can lead to:

1. Pressure to prove his manhood physically and sexually (becoming stronger and engaging in dangerous or violent behavior; having multiple female sexual partners).
2. Confusion over gender and sexual identity.
3. Sense of being an inadequate man.
4. Sense of lost power, control, and confidence to his manhood.
5. Problems with closeness and intimacy.
6. Sexual problems. (Note: Masters (1986) discusses sexual dysfunction and disorder in men who have been raped by women. According to the study, men who have been raped by women lose their "sense of personal dignity and confidence in [their] masculinity" and are unable to respond physically to a female partner, even two years after the rape.)
7. Fear of becoming 'homosexual' or 'gay'.
8. Homophobia.

==== Suicide possibility ====
The suicide rate for sexually abused males is 14 to 15 times higher than for other males. McDonald and Tijerino found in their research that some participants state that there were occasions on which they felt so bad that they engaged in self-harming behaviors, including suicide attempts, and/or had suicidal thoughts. There is also a study that shows that rape victims are 4.1 times more likely to contemplate suicide and 13 times more likely to attempt suicide than non-crime victims.

Males have a much higher rate of suicide than females. One common explanation relies on the social constructions of hegemonic masculinity and femininity. In a review of the literature on gender and suicide, male suicide rates were explained in terms of traditional gender roles. Male gender roles tend to emphasize greater levels of strength, independence, and risk-taking behavior. Reinforcement of this gender role often prevents males from seeking help for suicidal feelings and depression.

=== Healing therapy ===
Sexual assault victims need extensive emotional and psychological healing after the rape, but male survivors are not likely to speak out their cases. Elizabeth Donovan, a psychotherapist, said; "Males have the added burden of facing a society that doesn't believe rape can happen to them ... at all."

== Prevalence ==
=== United States ===
In 1995, the American Medical Association described male rape as a 'silent-violent epidemic'. The 2016/2017 NISVS report by the CDC stated that over 1 in 4 women and 1 in 26 men in the U.S. have been raped via penetration or have had an experience of attempted rape via penetration, while 1 in 9 men reported they were made to penetrate someone else in their lifetime. Furthermore, the CDC extrapolated that around 2.9 million women were raped and around 1.94 million men were raped (0.34 million) or forced to penetrate someone else (1.6 million) in the 12 months leading up to the report. Incidents of sexual violence in US are severely underreported, especially among male victims, leading to an assumption that the actual numbers are likely higher.

Stephanie Baird, a trauma recovery counselor, cited the "hot-for-teacher or babysitter complex" that is a popular motif in modern American culture. The culture makes it more difficult for a male adolescent to even recognize that he is being abused. She explained that consent means "being of age, mind, sound body to make an informed decision about whether one would like to become sexually intimate with the other person", while children cannot consent.

Various studies estimate that at least 1 in 6 men have experienced sexual assault or abuse in their lifetime in the United States.

=== United Kingdom ===
In 2014, UK government statistics estimated that each year about 78,000 people in the UK become rape or attempted rape victims, and about 9,000 of these are men. Research suggests that the notoriously low report rate is particularly true among male victims. About 1,250 incidents of male-victim rape were reported to the police in 2011–2012. In February 2014, the ministry of justice set aside £500,000 to provide counseling and support for sexually abused males.

=== China ===
No official statistics are collected. However, the United Nations' 2013 Multi-Country Study on Men and Violence in Asia and the Pacific found that 3% of Chinese men surveyed acknowledged having been raped by another man during their lifetime (suggesting that the proportion of male rapes as a percentage of all rapes was 14.4%).

=== Taiwan ===
Taiwan counted 12,066 victims of reported sexual assault in 2012 of which 1,335 victims were men. The Ministry of Interior showed that 7,608 minors were rape or sexual assault victims, with 1,063 of them being boys. To prevent the increasing number of these crimes, Taiwan's Ministry of Education had released a short film on sexual education. However, many internet users and students in Taiwan treated it as a subject of jokes. However, the National Academy of Educational Research Secretary-General Kuo Kung-pin stated that the video has achieved its purpose in gaining attention from the youth to remind them that men can be raped as well.

=== India ===
The rape of males in India is commonly underreported. For this reason, some activists and research organizations, including Jai Vipra at the New Delhi think-tank Centre for Civil Society, argue that the phrasing of rape laws should be gender-neutral. This view is opposed by some human rights advocates and women's rights activists. Mumbai-based human rights lawyer Flavia Agnes told the India Times, "I oppose proposal [sic] to make rape laws gender-neutral. We had opposed it when the government made child rape laws gender-neutral ... If made gender-neutral, rape laws will not have the deterrence value and it will make it more complicated for judges in court." International human rights lawyer and activist Vrinda Grover was quoted in the same article: "There are no instances of women raping men. I don't think men are facing serious sexual violence as [sic] women. Consider the brutality and intensity of sexual violence against women."

=== Indonesia ===
The Indonesian Child Protection Commission (Komisi Perlindungan Anak Indonesia, KPAI) reports that around 400 Indonesian children become victims of sexual assault per year, both by their families and other adults. According to KPAI Secretary General Erlinda, "the majority of children who are victims of sexual violence are males, because boys are vulnerable to becoming victims of sexual offenders as they are easily persuaded by perpetrators who are pedophiles."

Emayartini (2013) became the first Indonesian woman to be sentenced to prison for raping six teenage boys. She almost escaped the law after she was deemed to have a mental disorder. Unlike male rapists, she was subject to the Child Protection Law No. 23 of 2002, rather than the laws against rape.

== National laws ==
=== China ===
Before 2015, article 236 of the revised Criminal Law of China specifies that the crime of rape may be committed only against women. It protects women's right to sexual autonomy but not men's. In 2011, the first-ever conviction for sexual assault on a man occurred with a Beijing security guard as the perpetrator, but he was convicted of intentional injury rather than rape, sentenced to one year in prison and to pay 20,000 yuan ($3,026) as compensation. A convicted rapist will get at least three years in prison.

The guidelines of China on child protection strengthen the punishments for sexual offenses against underage girls, but don't offer equal protection to underage boys. Molestation of both sexes is treated equally at present, but the rapists of boys can only be charged with child molestation with 5 years in prison as a maximum sentence. In September 2013, 27 NGOs called for the law to give equal protection to boys below 18 years old in cases of sexual offences.

Until November 1, 2015, sexual offences against males above the age of 14 could not be prosecuted unless they also included a physical assault, in which case only the physical component was punishable. However, a revision of Article 237, which criminalises "forcible indecency," made that section of the law gender-neutral. Offences that constitute rape of males may be tried under this article, with offenders facing a maximum of five years in prison.

=== India ===
The Indian Penal Code, Section 377, is the only section that criminalizes all acts of nonconsensual carnal intercourse, including male-on-male rape.

Unnatural offences: Whoever voluntarily has carnal intercourse against the order of nature with any man, woman or animal, shall be punished with imprisonment for life, or with imprisonment of either description for term which may extend to ten years, and shall also be liable to fine. Explanation: Penetration is sufficient to constitute the carnal intercourse necessary to the offense described in this section.

This section penalizes both consensual and forced sodomy with 10 years minimum to life imprisonment. The Delhi HC stated that Section 377 of Indian Penal Code will continue to govern non-consensual penile, non-vaginal sex and penile non-vaginal sex involving minors. The section can be evoked to punish sodomites, pedophiles and zoophiles.

The rape definition in Section 375 of Indian Penal Code does not include rape in which males are the victims. The Indian government (2012) decided to change the definition of "rape" as forcible penetration to include male victims, but was criticized on the grounds that this would further harm the interests of female rape victims.

In the 2013 Criminal Law (Amendment) Ordinance, rape and sexual harassment crimes were gender neutral. The term "rape" was removed and substituted with "sexual assault". But strong objections were raised by feminist groups that made the Indian government decided to restore the term "rape" and state that only men can be the rapists of women.

=== Indonesia ===
Based on Kitab Undang-undang Hukum Pidana (Indonesian's Penal Code), males cannot be the victims of rape. In paragraph 285, rape is defined as a sexual violence against a female having a sentence of imprisonment for a maximum of 12 years, while in paragraph 289, the victim of "vulgar actions" is not defined as male or female and the punishment is a maximum of 9 years imprisonment. The commentary on paragraph 285 by R. Soesilo stated that the law makers didn't need to determine the punishment for a female perpetrator that forced males to have intercourse with her. This is not because such action is not possible, but the act is deemed to not do harm or result in something bad to male victims, such as pregnancy in females.

=== New Zealand ===
In New Zealand, the word "rape" can only be used in the instance where females are penetrated by a male. Females can be punished to the same degree as male-on-female rape, however.

=== Philippines ===
Prior to the 1997 amendment of Revised Penal Code of 1930, male victims of rape were not acknowledged under Philippine law. Article 266-A of the law defines rape by "an act of sexual assault" by any person either by "inserting his penis into another person's mouth or anal orifice" or inserting "any instrument or object, into the genital or anal orifice of another person". The 1997 amendment allowed the legal recognition of rape of males, both by other males and by females.

However there are different penalties for the offense of raping of boys compared to doing the same act to girls. Rape against boys is considered by law as rape by sexual assault, which carries a lesser penalty of six to 12 years of imprisonment while rape against girls are penalized by life imprisonment.

=== Singapore ===
Male victims of rape are not acknowledged in Singapore law. A male rape victim is not considered a rape victim under S375(1) of Penal Code, which defines rape as the act of a man penetrating a woman's vagina with his penis without her consent. Penetration of other body orifices is not rape but an unlawful sexual penetration (S376(1), Penal Code). Both crimes carry the same penalty: imprisonment for a term of up to 20 years plus fine or caning. (S375(2) and S376(4), Penal Code).

=== United Kingdom ===
Previously, English law did not include rape of males as a criminal offense and it was recorded as non-consensual buggery. A convicted rapist (of a female) could be imprisoned for life, stated Henry Leak, the chairman of Survivors organization, while buggery only carried 10 years maximum as a sentence. This is however no longer the case; the Criminal Justice and Public Order Act 1994 s. 142 was the first to lead this development and recognize male-victim rape; and the Sexual Offences Act 2003 states that penetration of the "mouth, anus or vagina with [the defendant's] penis" is sufficient for rape at s. 1(1)(a). R v Ismail [2005] All ER 216 further prevented distinction between "mouth, anus or vagina" when sentencing.

Under the Sexual Offences (Scotland) Act 2009 and the Sexual Offences (Northern Ireland) Order 2008 men can be both perpetrators and victims. However, in all parts of the United Kingdom a female cannot be legally charged with 'rape' (she must be instead charged with other offenses such as sexual assault, assault by penetration, or causing sexual activity without consent, of which the latter two carry the same maximum sentence).

=== United States ===
The FBI's Uniform Crime Report in 2012 redefined rape as: "The penetration, no matter how slight, of the vagina or anus with any body part or object, or oral penetration by a sex organ of another person, without the consent of the victim." The prior definition had not changed since 1927 and gained the attention of sexual assault awareness groups because it had alienated the victims who did not fit the definition – "the carnal knowledge of a female, forcibly and against her will". The former definition of "forcible rape" focused on vaginal penetration, but the newer definition includes forcible anal or oral penetration. The old definition, "the carnal knowledge of a female, forcibly and against her will", did not include forcible oral or anal penetration, the rape of women with other objects, or the rape of a man.

This new definition encourages male rape victims to seek the help they need and also includes sexual assaults that previously were not covered by the definition of rape. The basis for changing this definition lies in the statistics provided by governmental institutions such as the U.S. Department of Justice and the CDC. A study done by the CDC found that 1 in 71 men had been raped or had been the target of attempted rape. This study included oral and anal penetration in its definition but did not include men in prison or men made to penetrate. Gender-neutral laws have combated the perception that rape rarely occurs to men, and other laws have eliminated the term rape altogether. (Note: See, for example, Michigan Statutes for the first degree felony, section 520b: "(1) A person is guilty of criminal sexual conduct in the first degree if he or she engages in sexual penetration of another person.")

== See also ==
- Corrective rape
- Rape culture
- Domestic violence against men
- Rape by gender
- Masculism
- Men's liberation movement
- Men's rights movement
- If I Had Known Boys Could Be Sexually Assaulted Too
