= 1940s in organized crime =

This is a list of organized crime in the 1940s, arranged chronologically.

== 1940 ==
=== Events ===
- James J. Hines, the leader of Tammany Hall, the New York City Democratic organization, goes to prison for arranging political protection for Dutch Schultz's policy and numbers rackets in Harlem, New York.
- Brooklyn mobster Seymour "Blue Jaw" Magoon agrees to become a government informant and provides information on the Murder, Inc. organization.
- After a failed attempt on his life, New Jersey racketeer Max Rubin agrees to cooperate with law enforcement.
- Brooklyn racketeer James "Dizzy" Feraco is murdered by rival gunmen.
- February 2 – Abe "Kid Twist" Reles, a member of Murder, Inc., is arrested. District Attorney William O'Dwyer charges Reles with robbery, assault, possession of narcotics, burglary, disorderly conduct, and eight charges of murder. In exchange for a reduced sentence, Reles would agree to testify against the members of Murder, Inc., and provides information on the National Crime Syndicate. Phil and Martin Goldstein, Emmanuel Weiss, and Murder Inc. leader Louis "Lepke" Buchalter are some of the mobsters who would be convicted by Reles' testimony.
- April – George Scalise, New York labor racketeer and president of the Building Service and Employee's International Union of New York, is indicted for extortion.
- May 23 – Murder, Inc. members Harry Maione and Frank Abbandando, based on the testimony of Abe Reles, are convicted of the 1937 murder of Brooklyn loan shark George "Whitey" Rudnick. While the decision would be overturned on appeal, a second trial would find them guilty and result in death sentences for both men.
- July 31 – Whitey Krakower, a government informant, is murdered by New York mobster Benjamin "Bugsy" Siegel.

=== Arts and literature ===
- Black Friday (film) starring Boris Karloff and Bela Lugosi.
- Brother Orchid (film) starring Edward G. Robinson, Humphrey Bogart and Ralph Bellamy.
- Castle on the Hudson (film) starring John Garfield and Pat O'Brien.
- It All Came True (film) starring Humphrey Bogart.
- Johnny Apollo (film) starring Tyrone Power, Edward Arnold, Lloyd Nolan and Lionel Atwill.
- Queen of the Mob (film) starring Ralph Bellamy and Jack Carson.

=== Births ===
- March 23 – Thomas Bilotti "The Rug", Gambino crime family underboss
- May – Alphonso Sgroia "The Butcher", New York mobster
- October 27 – John Gotti "The Dapper Don"/"The Teflon Don", Gambino crime family leader
- December 29 – Charles Majuri "Big Ears", DeCavalcante crime family member

=== Deaths ===
- James Feraco "Dizzy", New York (Brooklyn) racketeer
- July 10 – Fred Burke aka Frederick Dane "Killer", Member of Egan's Rats and freelance syndicate hitman
- July 31 – Whitey Krakower, government informant

== 1941 ==
=== Events ===
- Syndicate hitman Charles "The Bug" Workman, a suspect in the murder of Dutch Schultz, is imprisoned.
- February – Emil Nizich, a minor organized crime figure involved in labor racketeering, is shot three times from behind and left in a gutter while on his way to a basketball game in Manhattan.
- February 6 – Benjamin "Benny the Boss" Tannenbaum, an associate of Louis "Lepke" Buchalter and Jacob "Gurrah" Shapiro, is murdered while babysitting at a friends house.
- June 12 – Murder Inc. members Harry Strauss and Martin Goldstein are executed by electrocution for the murder of gambler "Puggy" Feinstein.
- November 12 – Abe Reles, co-boss of Murder, Inc. turned informant, mysteriously plummets to his death from his guarded hotel room after Albert Anastasia promises a $100,000 reward for his demise.

=== Births ===
- Leoluca Bagarella "The Brother-In-Law", Sicilian mafioso
- John F. Castagna "Sonny", Patriarca crime family associate
- Salvatore D'Aquilla "Butch", Patriarca crime family associate
- Tino Fiumara, Genovese crime family member
- Antonio L. Spagnolo, Patriarca crime family soldier
- 11 September – Marcello Dell'Utri, Italian politician and mafia associate

=== Deaths ===
- February – Emil Nizich, New York mobster
- February 6 – Benjamin Tannenbaum "Benny the Boss", associate of Louis Buchalter and Jacob Shapiro
- June 12 – Martin Goldstein, Murder, Inc. hitman
- June 12 – Harry Strauss, Murder, Inc. hitman
- November 12 – Abe Reles "Kid Twist", Murder, Inc. hitman and government informant

== 1942 ==
=== Events ===
- Following his release from prison, Salvatore "Sam," "Mooney" Giancana becomes a high-ranking member of the Chicago Outfit and a personal advisor and primary enforcer for Antonino "Tony," "Joe Batters" Accardo.
- Eugenio "Gene" Giannini, a soldier for the Lucchese crime family, is apprehended by federal agents on heroin conspiracy charges. While serving fifteen months imprisonment, Giannini agrees to become a government informant for the Bureau of Narcotics and later the FBI.
- February 19 – Murder, Inc. members Harry Maione and Frank Abbandando are executed by the state of New York following their murder trial the previous year.
- May 12 – New York mobster Charles Luciano is transferred from Clinton State Prison in Dannemora, New York, to Great Meadow State Prison in Fort Ann, New York. Luciano meets with US military intelligence in prison to negotiate his early parole. Intelligence wants him to contact Sicilian mafiosi to aid the Sicily Invasion and to prevent sabotage on the waterfronts of the East Coast of the United States by Nazi sympathizers.
- August 3 - Morris "Moey" Wolenski, a lieutenant of Louis "Lepke" Buchalter, is murdered. Many suspect that Wolenski (or Wolinsky) mislead Buchalter about a deal to reduce Buchalter's prison sentence during his 1939 trial.
- December 5 – Vincenzo Capizzi, former leader of the Pittsburgh, Pennsylvania crime syndicate (reportedly succeeded by John Sebastian LaRocca in 1937), is arrested by FBI agents for conspiracy to violate the National Bankruptcy Act.

=== Births ===
- January 25 – Kenichi Shinoda, the founding head of the Kodo-kai and the sixth head of the Yamaguchi-gumi, the largest known yakuza syndicate in Japan
- August 6 – George Jung, Medellín Cartel drug trafficker
- September 7 – Roy DeMeo, Gambino crime family hitman and Capo
- September 16 – Tadamasa Goto, the founding head of the Goto-gumi, a secondary Yamaguchi-gumi affiliate
- Francesco Bonura, Sicilian mafia member
- Stephen Caracappa, NYPD officer and mob hitman
- Richard V. Gotti, member of the Gambino crime family
- Gennaro Langella (Jerry Lang), member of the Colombo crime family

=== Deaths ===
- February 19 – Harry Maione "Happy", Murder, Inc. hitman
- February 19 – Frank Abbandando "The Dasher", Murder, Inc. hitman
- July 20 - Moses Annenberg "Moe", newspaper publisher and Al Capone associate
- August 3 - Moey Wolinsky, a lieutenant of Louis Buchalter

== 1943 ==
=== Events ===
- January 11 – Carlo Tresca, editor of the Socialist Italian-language newspaper Il Martello, is murdered in Manhattan after seeking political asylum in the United States. Tresca's assassination, supposedly carried out by mobster Carmine Galante, was said to have been arranged by Italian dictator Benito Mussolini's fascist government.
- January 25 – New York mobster Gaetano "Tommy" Lucchese becomes a naturalized US citizen despite efforts of the U.S. government to thwart it.
- February 2 – Chicago's "Queen of the Dice Girls" and Outfit-associate girlfriend, Estelle Carey, is found brutally murdered and burned, possibly in connection to The Outfit – Hollywood extortion scandal then under federal investigation.
- March 18 – Several high-ranking members of the Chicago Outfit including Francesco "Frank 'The Enforcer' Nitti" Nitto, Felice "Paul 'The Waiter' Ricca" DeLucia, Phil D'Andrea, Charles "Cherry Nose" Gioe, Lou Kaufman, Louis "Little New York" Campagna and Filippo "John 'Handsome Johnny' Roselli" Sacco are indicted by a federal grand jury in connection to extortion operations against Hollywood movie studios by Outfit turncoat William Morris "Willie" Bioff.
- March 19 – Shortly after being indicted for extortion, Outfit boss Francesco "Frank 'The Enforcer' Nitti" Nitto commits suicide near a Riverside, Illinois railroad yard. Nitti kills himself because underboss Paul Ricca insists that Nitti take responsibility for the Hollywood extortion operation and serve the prison term, because Nitti brought the likes of Outfit turncoat William Morris "Willie" Bioff into the Hollywood scheme. However, Nitti suffers from severe claustrophobia. Antonino "Tony," "Joe Batters" Accardo succeeds Nitti as the day-to-day boss of the organization, while Ricca gets a prison sentence.
- July 9–10 – The Allied invasion of Sicily (Operation Husky) ends August 17 in an Allied victory. Sicilian Mafia boss Calogero Vizzini allegedly helps the American army during the invasion. In the US, the Office of Naval Intelligence (ONI) had recruited Mafia support to protect the New York waterfront from Axis powers sabotage since the US had entered the war in December 1941. The ONI collaborated with Charles "Lucky" Luciano and his partner Meyer Lansky, a Jewish mobster, in what was called Operation Underworld. The resulting Mafia contacts were also used by the US Office of Strategic Services (OSS) – the wartime predecessor of the Central Intelligence Agency (CIA) – during the invasion of Sicily. Popular myth has it that a US Army airplane had flown over Vizzini’s home town Villalba on the day of the invasion and dropped a yellow silk handkerchief marked with a black L (indicating Luciano). Two days later, three American tanks rolled into Villalba after driving thirty miles through enemy territory. Vizzini climbed aboard and spent the next six days traveling through western Sicily organizing support for the advancing American troops. As General Patton's Third Division moved onward the signs of its dependence on Mafia support were obvious to the local population. The Mafia protected the roads from snipers, arranged enthusiastic welcomes for the advancing troops, and provided guides through the confusing mountain terrain. Many historians are inclined to dismiss this legend nowadays. The American Military Government of Occupied Territories (AMGOT) looking for anti-fascist notables to replace fascist authorities made Don Calogero Vizzini mayor of Villalba, as well as an Honorary Colonel of the US Army. Because of his excellent connections, Vizzini also became the ‘king’ of the rampant post-war black market. AMGOT relied on mafiosi who were considered staunch anti-fascists because of the repression under Benito Mussolini. Many other mafiosi, such as Calogero Vizzini and Giuseppe Genco Russo, were appointed as mayors of their own home towns. Coordinating the AMGOT effort was the former lieutenant-governor of New York, Colonel Charles Poletti, whom Luciano once described as "one of our good friends." The US Military grants Michele Navarra, the Mafia boss of Corleone, permission to collect abandoned military vehicles left by the Italian army during the allied invasion of Sicily.
- October 28 – Former leader of the New Orleans crime family Carlo Matranga dies in Los Angeles, California of natural causes.
- December 22 – Paul Ricca, Louis Campagna, John Roselli and four other defendants are convicted of extortion with each fined $10,000 and received prison sentences ranging from seven-to-10 years. They "walk" after three years, because of some dubious, behind-the-scenes mischief between The Outfit and the U.S. Justice Department, during the Truman Administration.

=== Births ===
- September 8 – Marat Balagula, Russian mob in the US
- June 11 – Henry Hill, Lucchese crime family associate

=== Deaths ===
- March 19 – Frank Nitti, Chicago Outfit leader
- October 28 – Carlo Matranga, New Orleans crime family leader

== 1944 ==
=== Events ===
- New York mobster Joe Adonis leaves Brooklyn eventually moving to Palisades Park, New Jersey.
- January 14 - Benjamin "Zookie the Bookie" Zuckerman, a member of the Chicago syndicate involved in illegal gambling, is killed.
- March 4 - Emmanuel "Mendy" Weiss, a syndicate hitman and a suspected gunman in the murder of Dutch Schultz, is executed.
- March 4 – Murder, Inc. leader Louis Buchalter is sent to the electric chair and executed by the state of New York. He is the last member of Murder, Inc. to be executed.
- April 22 – Frank Abatte, a major racketeer of Calumet City, Illinois who has been missing since Feb. 24, is found murdered near Hot Springs, Arkansas.
- April 23 – Rocco Perri disappeared, and his body never found
- August 6 - Chicago Outfit enforcer William Daddano, Sr. arrested for attempted robbery of three million war ration stamps.
- August 7 – Vito Genovese, eluding U.S. authorities for over a decade following his indictment for the 1934 murder of Ferdinand Boccia, is finally apprehended in Italy and deported back to the United States to stand trial. However, shortly after his arrival on June 1, 1945, the governments star witness dies of an "overdose of sedatives" while in protective custody. Genovese was eventually acquitted of charges on June 10, 1946.
- September 16 – Leaders of the Blocco del popolo (The Popular Front) in Sicily, the communist Girolamo Li Causi and socialist Michele Pantaleone, went to speak to the landless labourers at an election rally in Villalba, challenging Mafia boss Calogero Vizzini in his own personal fiefdom. Li Causi denounced the unjust exploitation of the peasantry by the Mafia. The rally ended in a shoot-out which left 18 people wounded including Li Causi and Pantaleone. In the following years, left-wing leaders in Sicily were killed or otherwise attacked, culminating in the killing of 11 people and the wounding of over thirty at the May 1, 1947, labour parade in "Portella di Ginestra", the vale between three villages. The attack was attributed to the bandit and separatist leader Salvatore Giuliano. However, the Mafia was suspected of involvement in many of the attacks on left wing labour leaders.
- October 19 – Cleveland crime syndicate Alfred "Big Al" Polizzi pleads guilty for failing to pay federal liquor taxes and, following his release from prison in 1945, retires to Coral Gables, Florida. John Scalish assumes Polizzi's role as head of the Cleaveland family, shortly after Polizzi's imprisonment.

=== Births ===
- March 22 – Anthony Pellicano, Los Angeles private investigator
- December 9 – Tadashi Irie, a prominent yakuza related to the Takumi-gumi and its parent syndicate, the Yamaguchi-gumi
- Salvatore Inzerillo, Palermo mafioso, captain of the Passo di Rigano family
- Paul Schiro "Paulie", Chicago Outfit gambling racketeer
- Michael Spilotro, Chicago Outfit associate and brother of Anthony and Victor Spilotro

=== Deaths ===
- January 14 – Benjamin Zuckerman "Zookie the Bookie", a.k.a. "Little Zukie", Chicago syndicate mobster involved in illegal gambling
- March 4 – Louis Buchalter, Murder, Inc. leader
- March 4 – Louis Capone, Murder, Inc. hitman
- March 4 – Emanuel Weiss, Murder, Inc. hitman and member of the Luciano crime family
- April 22 – Frank Abatte, Illinois mobster (body discovered)
- November 28 – Frank Todaro, New Orleans crime family leader

== 1945 ==
=== Events ===
- Vito Genovese, after living in Sicily for several years, returns to the United States. He is finally tried for the 1937 murder of Ferdinand Boccia and is acquitted. Soon after the trial, Genovese establishes himself in the Luciano crime family where he would compete for dominance against Frank Costello.
- February 24 – Cleveland racketeer Nathan Weisenberg, the "Slots King of Ohio", whose monopoly on vending and slot machines stretches as far as Arizona and Colorado, is murdered by members of the Cleveland crime syndicate.

=== Births ===
- Antonino Cina, Sicilian mafia regional boss and commission member
- Biagio DiGiacomo, Patriarca crime family caporegime
- Gerard Pappa, Genovese crime family soldier
- Lawrence Ricci, Genovese crime family caporegime

=== Deaths ===
- February 24 – Nathan Weisenberg, Cleveland gambling racketeer
- August 23 – James Belcastro, Chicago Outfit extortionist

== 1946 ==
=== Events ===
- Vincent Gigante retires from boxing and becomes involved in organized crime.
- Joseph Ida succeeds G.Dovi as leader of the Philadelphia crime family.
- January – Lucky Luciano is pardoned and released from jail by New York Governor Thomas Dewey, as part of an arrangement for Luciano providing intelligence during World War II, and deported to Sicily.
- February 2–9 – Shortly before his deportation, federal authorities transfer Luciano from Great Meadow Prison to Ellis Island where he remains until boarding the Laura Keene for Sicily.
- June 24 – James M. Ragen is ambushed while stopped at Pershing Road and seriously wounded in the arms and legs by a shotgun blast from syndicate gunman, including William Block. Although beginning to recover from his wounds, he died from mercury poisoning on August 14. Although David "Yiddles" Miller, a West Side illegal gambling racketeer and former member of Ragen's Colts along with Ragen, is indicted for his murder, the case is nol prossed.
- July – A conference is held by the National Crime Syndicate in Atlantic City, New Jersey.
- October – A conference is held in Havana, Cuba which is attended by syndicate leaders including Meyer Lansky and Luciano.
- December 22 – The Havana Conference is held by the National Crime Syndicate, where the rivalry between Luciano and Vito Genovese is discussed (resulting in Luciano being elected Capo Di Tutti Cappi), as well discussions on the matter of Benjamin Siegel following the losses of the Las Vegas casino The Flamingo.

=== Births ===
- James Eppolito, Gambino crime family member
- Gene Gotti, member of the Gambino crime family
- January 3 – Antonio Rotolo, future boss of the Pagliarelli clan
- January 8 – Miguel Ángel Félix Gallardo, Mexican drug lord and head of the Guadalajara Cartel
- February 23 – Louis Daidone "Louis Bagels", Lucchese crime family, acting boss
- June 24 – William D'Elia, current leader of the Bufalino crime family
- December 21 – Jimmy Coonan, co-leader of the Westies

=== Deaths ===
- June 24 – James M. Ragen, Chicago mobster and co-founder of the Ragen's Colts street gang
- April 13 – Tommy Vescetti, Los Angeles mobster, assassinated in cafe.

== 1947 ==
=== Events ===
- New York gangster Albert Anastasia moves to Palisades Park, New Jersey, where he becomes an associate of Joe Adonis and meets regularly with other New Jersey organized crime figures such as Anthony "Tony Bender" Strollo and the Moretti brothers.
- Jacob "Gurrah" Shapiro dies in prison while serving a life sentence. Shapiro had been a leader of the Murder Inc. organization in New York.
- Carl Shelton, co-founder of the Prohibition-era Shelton Gang, is murdered by former gang member Frank "Buster" Wortman.
- Edwin Rogers Lowenstein, supported by Cleveland mobsters Moe Dalitz and Morris Kleinman, establishes bookmaking operations under E.R. Lowe & Co. with Harold Fischer and Fred Kreisler in Tucson, Arizona and Albuquerque, New Mexico This becomes one of the earliest syndicate criminal activities in the Southwestern United States and is eventually known as the "Tucson Front". The Tucson Front would later include front businesses such as the hotel chain run by George Gordon.
- January 8 – Andy Hintz, a New York stevedore and local waterfront hiring boss, is shot six times and severely wounded by three unidentified men while leaving his Greenwich Village apartment. Hintz survives the shooting and identifies his assailants as longshoreman John M. "Cockeye" Dunn, Andrew "Squint" Sheridan and Danny Gentile. On January 29, Hintz would finally die from his wounds.
- January 25 – Al Capone dies of a cerebral hemorrhage in his Miami, Florida estate as a result of advanced syphilis.
- February 22 – U.S. mob boss Charles "Lucky" Luciano is arrested by Cuban authorities under pressure from the United States Government. Deported to Italy after World War II, Luciano had become a Cuban resident in October 1946. While in Cuba, Luciano was reportedly in contact with high ranking U.S. organized crime figures including Vito Genovese, Frank Costello, Albert Anastasia, Tony Accardo, Carlos Marcello and Meyer Lansky. On March 20, Cuba would deport Luciano back to Italy.
- March 27 - Thomas Buffa, a drug trafficker and associate of Tony Lopiparo, is killed in Lodi, California.
- May 1 – At the labour parade in Portella della Ginestra, Sicily, 11 people are killed and over thirty are wounded. The attack would later be attributed to Salvatore Giuliano, the Sicilian bandit and separatist leader. Mafia leaders like Calogero Vizzini had initially supported Guiliano and his separatist movement. However, when it became clear that Sicily would never achieve independence, Vizzini changed sides and joined the Italian Christian Democrat (DC – Democrazia Cristiana) party. Bernardo Mattarella, one of the party’s leaders, had welcomed Vizzini in a 1945 article in the Catholic newspaper Il Popolo. Vizzini’s support for the DC would never be a secret. During the crucial 1948 elections that would decide Italy’s post-war future, Vizzini and Mafia boss Giuseppe Genco Russo would share a table with leading DC politicians attending an electoral lunch. In 1950, Vizzini would allegedly help Italian police capture and kill Giuliano.
- May 5 – The "Black Diamond Meeting" is held in New Orleans to name a successor to "Silver Dollar" Sam Carolla, who would soon be deported from the United States. Attendees include Carolla underboss Frank Todaro; capos Thomas Rizzuto, Nick Grifazzi, Joseph Capro and Frank Lombardino; Carolla's son Anthony Carolla, and Carlos Marcello. During this meeting, Carolla passes his leadership role to Todaro. However, by 1950 underboss Carlos Marcello would control organized crime in New Orleans.
- May 7/9 – Nicholas DeJohn, a Chicago mobster and San Francisco crime leader, is found strangled to death in the trunk of a car in San Francisco. Leonard Calamia, a syndicate gunman and known drug trafficker, is charged with his murder, but is later acquitted.
- June 20 – Mobster Benjamin Siegel is killed by an unidentified gunman at the Beverly Hills, California home of girlfriend Virginia Hill. Siegal had built The Flamingo hotel and casino in Las Vegas using millions of dollars in Mafia money.
- September 20 – New York Mayor Fiorello La Guardia, a major opponent of organized crime, dies of cancer.

=== Arts and literature ===
- The Gangster (film) starring Barry Sullivan.

=== Births ===
- Domenico Cefalu "Italian Dom", Gambino crime family underboss
- September 5 – Kiyoshi Takayama, a prominent yakuza related to the Kodo-kai and its parent syndicate, the Yamaguchi-gumi
- September 22 – Salvatore Vitale "Good Looking Sal", Bonanno crime family member
- October 4 – Roy Francis Adkins, English gangster and drug trafficker

=== Deaths ===
- Jacob Shapiro "Gurrah", New York mobster and labor racketeer
- 25 January – Al Capone "Scarface", Chicago Outfit leader
- March 27 - Thomas Buffa, drug trafficker and associate of Tony Lopiparo
- May 9 – Nicholas DeJohn, San Francisco crime leader and Chicago Outfit member
- 20 June – Benjamin "Bugsy Siegel, New York mobster, Las Vegas casino manager, and member of the National Crime Syndicate
- September 20 – Fiorello La Guardia, Mayor of New York

== 1948 ==
=== Events ===
- Tommaso Buscetta becomes a made member of the Porta Nuovo Mafia family in Palermo, Sicily.
- July 16 – Charles Yarnowsky, a syndicate mobster in Jersey City, New Jersey is found stabbed to death in Clifton.
- August 10 – John DiBiaso, a lieutenant of Charles Yarnowski, is murdered, shot dead in front of his home in Elizabeth, New Jersey, only 25 days after Yarnowski's death.

=== Deaths ===
- July 16 – Charles Yarnowsky, Jersey City, New Jersey syndicate mobster
- August 10 – John DiBiaso, Charles Yarnowski lieutenant

== 1949 ==
=== Events ===
- September 16 – Philip "Little Farfel" Kavolick, a member of Meyer Lansky's syndicate organization, is murdered in Valley Stream, New York.
- November 25 – Robert "Tinman" Sneddon, notorious Irish gangster, evades police in Boston, Massachusetts after a warrant is issued for his arrest.

=== Arts and literature ===
- Raoul Walsh's White Heat is released starring James Cagney, Edmond O'Brien and Virginia Mayo.

=== Births ===
- Louis Eppolito, NYPD officer and mob hitman
- Frank P. Frassetto, Rochester mobster
- Mahmood Ozdemir, UK Turkish crime boss
- Leonidas Vargas, Colombian drug lord
- 24 October – Francisco Rafael Arellano Félix, Mexican drug lord and Tijuana Cartel member.

=== Deaths ===
- September 16 – Philip Kavolick "Little Farfel", Meyer Lansky associate and National Crime Syndicate member
