= List of Jewish American mobsters =

This is a list of Jewish American mobsters and organized crime figures, ranging from the late 19th century to the present day.

Name	Portrait	Life	Years active	Notes	References
Hyman Abrams	No image available		1920s–1960s	Lieutenant of Boston Mobster Charles Solomon during Prohibition. Later financed syndicate Las Vegas casinos with Meyer Lansky, Carl Cohen and Jack Entratter during the 1950s and 1960s.	
Hyman Amberg	No image available	1902–1926	1919–1926	New York mobster and chief enforcer for his brothers Joseph and Louis "Pretty" Amberg. Hyman and another convict committed suicide following an unsuccessful escape attempt from Tombs Prison.	
Joseph Amberg	No image available	1892–1935	1919–1935	New York mobster who led one of the top gangs in Brooklyn during the 1920s and 1930s with brothers Hyman and Louis Amberg. Amberg and an associate, Morris Kessler, were executed by Murder, Inc. in his Brownsville auto garage.	
Louis "Pretty" Amberg	No image available	1897–1935	1919–1935	He and brothers Hyman and Joseph Amberg led one of the top criminal gangs in Brooklyn during the 1920s and 1930s. The last surviving brother, he was murdered a month after his brother Joseph by members of Murder, Inc.	
Moses Annenberg	No image available	1877–1942	1904–1936	Newspaperman and organized crime figure. Hired and directed criminal gangs on behalf of the Hearst Corporation during Chicago's "circulation wars" of 1910–1911, and later became owner of the National Racing Wire during the 1920s and 1930s. Later used his wealth to purchase The Philadelphia Inquirer and found the Annenberg Foundation. Jailed for tax evasion in 1939.	
David Berman	No image available	1903–1957	1916–1957	Associate member of the Genovese crime family who ran syndicate operations in Iowa and Minnesota from the 1920s to the 1940s. Involved in syndicate casinos in Las Vegas during the 1940s and 1950s, he and Moe Sedway took over The Flamingo after Bugsy Siegel's murder in 1947.	
Otto "Abbadabba" Berman	No image available	1889–1935	1920s–1930s	Mob accountant and financial advisor for New York mobster Dutch Schultz.	
Abe Bernstein	No image available	1892–1968	1910s–1960s	Detroit mobster and leader of The Purple Gang. After the end of Prohibition, he ran syndicate gambling operations in Miami up until his death in 1968.	
William Morris Bioff	No image available	1900–1955	1920s–1930s	Chicago labor racketeer who extorted millions of dollars from Hollywood studios on behalf of the Chicago Outfit during the 1930s.	
Charles Birger	No image available	1881–1928	1919–1928	Illinois bootlegger who feuded with the Shelton Brothers Gang throughout Prohibition.	
Alex "Shondor" Birns	No image available	1907–1975		A major gangland figure in Cleveland throughout the 20th century. At one time considered Public Enemy No. 1, he controlled the city's underworld until his murder by Danny Greene in 1975.	
Herbert Blitzstein	No image available	1934–1997		Loanshark and bookmaker for the Chicago Outfit during the 1950s and 1960s. He was the top lieutenant of Anthony Spilotro when he and his crew were sent to Las Vegas.	
Ike Bloom		1865–1930		An early organized crime figure in Chicago associated with "Big Jim" Colosimo. Owned some of the city's most popular nightclubs, such as Midnight Frolics and Kreiberg's, during Prohibition.	
Isadore "Kid Cann" Blumenfeld	No image available	1900–1981	1900s–1980s	Minneapolis mobster who ran the city's underworld from the 1920s until his conviction for violating the Mann Act in 1957. Later retired to Miami Beach where he and Meyer Lansky operated a real estate empire and were involved in syndicate operations in Miami and Havana up until his death in 1981.	
Louis "Lepke" Buchalter		1897–1944	1910s–1940s	New York labor racketeer who dominated the Lower East Side with Jacob Shapiro during the 1920s and 1930s. Later headed Murder, Inc. and was eventually sent to the electric chair at Sing Sing for his role in the organization. He is the only major mobster to be executed by the state.	
Mickey Cohen		1914–1976	1923–1961	Major underworld figure in Los Angeles during the 1930s and 1940s. Later helped Bugsy Siegel set up The Flamingo in Las Vegas and ran its sports book operation.	
Louis Cohen		1904–1939	1910s–1930s	New York mobster who killed Nathan Kaplan on behalf of rival labor racketeers Jacob Orgen and Louis Buchalter in 1923.	
Moe Dalitz	No image available	1899–1989	1920s–1960s	Leader of the Mayfield Road Gang during Prohibition. He was later involved in the development of syndicate gaming in Las Vegas during the 1940s and 1950s.	
Mendel Epstein	No image available	b. 1940s	1980s –2013	New York gangster who until his arrest in 2013 led a divorce-gang that kidnapped, tortured and extorted Jewish men into religiously divorcing their wives.	
John Factor	No image available	1892–1984	1920s–1960s	British-born Chicago gangster and con artist associated with the Chicago Outfit whose staged 1933 kidnapping resulted in the wrongful conviction of Roger Touhy. He later became a prominent businessman and casino owner in Las Vegas 1950s and 1960s.	
Benjamin "Dopey Benny" Fein		1889–1977?	1900–1941	New York mobster who dominated labor racketeering with Joseph Rosenzweig on the Lower East Side during the 1910s.	
Abraham Friedman	No image available	1897–1939	1920s–1930s	New York mobster and enforcer for labor racketeer Nathan Kaplan, and later Louis Buchalter and Jacob Shapiro during the 1920s and 1930s.	
Martin Goldstein		1905–1941	1920s–1930s	Hitman and member of Murder, Inc. Involved in the 1939 murder of Irving Feinstein and later executed with other members of Murder, Inc. in 1941.	
Waxey Gordon	No image available	1889–1952	1900s–1950s	New York mobster who oversaw bootlegging operations for Arnold Rothstein during Prohibition. He was eventually imprisoned for tax evasion in 1933 and, again in 1951, for selling heroin.	
Gus Greenbaum	No image available	1894–1958	1910s–1950s	Member of the Chicago Outfit and ran syndicate casinos in Las Vegas during the 1940s and 1950s.	
Max "Big Maxie" Greenberg	No image available	1883–1933		Detroit mobster and a member of Egan's Rats.	
Jake "Greasy Thumb" Guzik	No image available	1886–1956	1910s–1950s	Financial and legal advisor to the Chicago Outfit.	
Hyman Holtz	No image available	1896–1939	1920s–1930s	New York labor racketeer associated with Jacob Orgen and a later protege of Louis Buchalter.	
Harry Horowitz aka Gyp the Blood		1889–1914	1900s–1910s	Leader of the Lenox Avenue Gang.	
"Kid Dropper" Nathan Kaplan	No image available	1895–1923	1910s–1920s	A former member of the Five Points Gang, he and Johnny Spanish fought over control of labor racketeering during the Labor Slugger Wars.	
Phillip Kastel	No image available	1893–1962	1900s–1950s	New York gambler associated with Arnold Rothstein and Frank Costello. He later ran gambling operations for the Genovese crime family in New Orleans.	
Harry Keywell	No image available	1910–1997	1920s–1930s	Detroit mobster and member of The Purple Gang. A suspect in the St. Valentine's Day Massacre and later convicted of Collingwood Manor Massacre in 1931.	
Lou Kravitz	No image available	fl. 1933–1939	1930s	New York labor racketeer and drug trafficker involved in a major heroin operation with Jack Lvovsky and Yasha Katzenberg during the early 1930s. Later testified against Lepke Buchalter at his trial.	
Abe Landau	No image available	1898–1935	1920s–1930s	Lieutenant of New York mobster Dutch Schultz.	
Meyer Lansky		1902–1983	1910s–1970s	One of the major underworld figures of the 20th century. He was involved in the formation of the National Crime Syndicate and helped organize syndicate gambling operations in Cuba and Las Vegas.	
Samuel "Red" Levine		1903–1972	1920s–1930s	Hitman and member of Murder, Inc. Involved in the 1931 murders of Abraham "Bo" Weinberg, Joe Masseria and Salvatore Maranzano.	
Vach "Cyclone Louie" Lewis	No image available	d. 1908	1900s	A former circus strongman and bodyguard of New York gang leader Max "Kid Twist" Zwerbach. He and Zwerbach were gunned down by Louie the Lump at Coney Island in 1908.	
Seymour Magoon	No image available	d. 1940	1920s–1930s	Hitman and member of Murder, Inc. Later became a state witness and corroborated Reles' testimony.	
Harry Maione	No image available	1908–1942	1920s–1930s	Hitman and member of Murder, Inc. Participated in the murders of the Shapiro Brothers and George Rudnick.	
Hyman "Pittsburgh Hymie" Martin	No image available	1903–1987	1920s–1930s	Pittsburgh mobster associated with Moe Davis and Lou Rothkopf. Acquitted of the 1931 murder of Cleveland city councilman William E. Potter.	
Samuel "Nails" Morton	No image available	1894–1923	1910s–1920s	A former World War I war hero, Weiss was among Dion O'Bannion's top enforcers in the North Side Gang during the early 1920s.	
Jacob "Little Augie" Orgen		1901–1927	1900s–1920s	New York gangster involved in bootlegging and labor racketeering during Prohibition. He took control of the garment district from Nathan Kaplan at the end of the end of the third labor sluggers war. Killed by his former associates Lepke Buchalter and Jacob Shapiro in 1927.	
Abe "Kid Twist" Reles		1906–1941	1921–1940	One of the most feared hitmen of Murder, Inc. during the 1930s, he later became a government witness and was responsible for sending many of his former partners to the electric chair. Died under suspicious circumstances while in protective custody in 1941.	
Harry Rosen	No image available		1920s–1950s	Major bootlegger in Philadelphia during Prohibition. He was a member of the Big Seven and later involved in drug trafficking with Meyer Lansky during the 1930s.	
Chris Rosenberg		1950–1979	1970s	A member of the Gambino crime family's DeMeo crew during the 1970s. He was later killed by DeMeo to cover up the murder of Colombian drug cartel members.	
Bernard Rosencrantz	No image available	1902–1935	1920s–1930s	Bodyguard and chauffeur of New York mobster Dutch Schultz.	
Frank "Lefty" Rosenthal	No image available	1929–2008	1960s–1980s	One of the top sports handicappers in the United States during his lifetime. Secretly ran several syndicate casinos for the Chicago Outfit, most notably the Stardust, throughout the 1960s and 1970s.	
Joseph "Joe the Greaser" Rosenzweig	No image available	1891–?	1910s	New York labor racketeer allied with "Dopey" Benny Fein during the first labor slugger war.	
Lou Rothkopf	No image available		1920s–1930s	Longtime associate of Meyer Lansky, he was a member of the Bug and Meyer Mob during Prohibition. Later ran syndicate gambling operations in Cleveland with Moe Dalitz, Jack Licavoli, Maurice Kleinman and Thomas Joseph McGinty (aka T. J. McGinty).	
Arnold "The Brain" Rothstein		1882–1928	1900s–1920s	One of the first major underworld figures in New York during the early 20th century. Widely reputed to have been behind the Black Sox scandal of 1919.	
Arthur "Dutch Schultz" Flegenheimer		1902–1935	1910s–1930s	Headed bootlegging and policy rackets in New York during the 1920s and 1930s.	
Moe Sedway	No image available	1894–1952	1920s–1950s	Lieutenant of New York mobster Meyer Lansky. Later involved in running syndicate casinos in Las Vegas during the 1940s and 1950s.	
Irving, Meyer and William Shapiro	No image available	1904–1931 (Irving); 1908–1931 (Meyer); 1911–1934 (William)	1920s–1930s	Rivals of Louis Buchalter and Jacob Shapiro during the late 1920s and 1930s. Irving and Meyer Shapiro were killed after initiating a gang war with Buchalter and Shapiro in 1931. William Shapiro was eventually murdered by Murder, Inc. in 1934.	
Jacob "Gurrah" Shapiro		1899–1947	1910s–1940s	He and Louis Buchalter controlled industrial labor racketeering in New York during the 1920s and 1930s. Shapiro also helped establish Murder, Inc. Died in prison in 1947.	
Benjamin "Bugsy" Siegel		1906–1947	1910s–1940s	New York mobster associated with Meyer Lansky, Frank Costello and Charles "Lucky" Luciano during Prohibition. Credited with the creation of syndicate casinos in Las Vegas during the 1940s.	
Charles "King" Solomon	No image available	1884–1933	1900s–1930s	He and Irish gangster Dan Carroll controlled bootlegging, narcotics and illegal gambling in Boston during Prohibition. Killed at the Cotton Club by rival mobsters in 1933.	
John "Johnny Spanish" Wheiler	No image available	1891–1919	1900s–1910s	A former member of the Five Points Gang, he and "Kid Dropper" Nathan Kaplan battled over New York's garment district during the Second Labor Sluggers War.	
Joseph "Doc" Stacher	No image available	1902–1977	1920s–1960s	An associate of Abner Zwillman and Meyer Lansky. Assisted Lansky in organizing the Atlantic City Conference and later in financing syndicate casinos in Las Vegas. Deported from the U.S. in 1964 and later emigrated to Israel where he died years later.	
Harry "Pittsburgh Phil" Strauss		1909–1941	1927–1941	Hitman and member of Murder, Inc. credited with the murder of Irving Feinstein and at least five other gangland slayings. Sent to the electric chair at Sing Sing in 1941.	
Albert "Tick–tock" Tannenbaum	No image available	1906–1976	1920s–1950s	Enforcer and hitman for Lepke Buchalter during the 1920s and 1930s. A member of Murder, Inc., he was responsible for the 1939 murder of Harry Greenberg.	
Benjamin Tannenbaum	No image available	1906–1941	1920s–1930s	Mob accountant for New York labor racketeers Louis Buchalter and Jacob Shapiro during the 1920s and 1930s. Murdered by members of Murder, Inc. in 1941 while babysitting for a friend.	
Abraham Weinberg		1897–1935?	1920s–1930s	Hitman and chief lieutenant for New York mobster Dutch Schultz during Prohibition. Disappeared in 1935 and long presumed to have been killed by the mob.	
George Weinberg	No image available	1901–1939	1920s–1930s	Younger brother of Schultz' gunman Abraham Weinberg. After his brother's disappearance in 1935, he agreed to become a government witness but committed suicide while in police custody in 1939.	
Emanuel Weiss		1906–1944	1920s–1930s	An enforcer for New York labor racketeer Louis "Lepke" Buchalter during the 1920s. He was also a member of Murder, Inc. up until his arrest in 1940.	
Jack "Big Jack" Zelig		1882–1912	1890s–1910s	Start of the 20th century gangster and one-time leader of the Eastman Gang. Killed by Phil Davidson shortly before his testimony in the Charles Becker murder trial in 1912.	
Max "Kid Twist" Zwerbach		d. 1908	1890s–1900s	New York gangster and head of the Eastman Gang after the arrest of Monk Eastman in 1904. Engaging in a feud with the Five Points Gang, he and his bodyguard were gunned down by Louie the Lump at Coney Island in 1908.	
Abner "Longy" Zwillman	No image available	1891–1959	1910s–1950s	Prohibition gangster. Popularly known as the "Al Capone of New Jersey", he was a founding member of the "Big Seven" Ruling Commission. He was also associated with Murder, Inc.	

== See also ==
- List of mobsters by city
