= Harry Maione =

American mobster (1908–1942)

- Mug shot taken on March 7, 1940
- Born: October 7, 1908; New York City, U.S.
- Died: February 19, 1942 (aged 33); Sing Sing Prison, New York, U.S.
- Other name: Happy
- Occupation: Hitman
- Children: 1
- Status: Executed by electrocution
- Allegiance: Murder, Inc.
- Conviction: First degree murder
- Penalty: Death

Harry "Happy" Maione (October 7, 1908 – February 19, 1942) was a New York mobster who served as a hitman for Murder, Inc., the enforcement arm of the National Crime Syndicate, during the 1930s. Maione was called "Happy" because his face displayed an eternal scowl.

== Early years ==
Maione was born in 1908 in New York City, Both his parents Albert and Jennie Maione were born in Italy, He had 8 siblings, Louis, Michael, Carl, Mary, Albert, Margaret, Anna and Lawrence. As a young man, Maione led the Ocean Hill Hooligans, an Italian street gang in the Ocean Hill, Brooklyn section of New York. His protégé in this gang was Frank "The Dasher" Abbandando. Maione had a son, Albert Maione, who eventually became an associate with the Gambino crime family. Maione's older brother was Louis "The Duke" Maione.

In 1931, Maione and Abbandando helped Abe "Kid Twist" Reles and Martin "Bugsy" Goldstein eliminate their gangster rivals, the Shapiro Brothers, Meyer, Irving, and William. Previously that year, the Shapiros had unsuccessfully tried to murder Reles and Goldstein. Meyer Shapiro then abducted Reles' girlfriend and raped her.

Reles and Goldstein wanted revenge and the two wanted to take over the Shapiro operations. On July 11, 1931, Irving Shapiro was gunned down near his apartment. On September 17, 1931, Meyer was found shot to death in the basement of a tenement building on Manhattan's Lower East Side.

== Murder, Inc. ==
Maione, Abbandando, Reles, and Goldstein then banded together. They were soon joined by Harry "Pittsburgh Phil" Strauss, Albert "Tick Tock" Tannenbaum, Seymour "Blue Jaw" Magoon, Louis Capone, Charles "The Bug" Workman and Vito "Chicken Head" Gurino.

The gang started picking up murder contracts from the National Crime Syndicate with the help of Syndicate Board Member Joe Adonis. The gang soon became the official murder-for-hire squad of the Syndicate, and was dubbed "Murder, Inc." by the press. Maione acted as the Italian liaison to the Jewish members of Murder, Inc.. Reles was his counterpart on the Jewish side.

Murder, Inc. was directed by the brutal Louis "Lepke" Buchalter (another member of the Syndicate board) and the nefarious Albert "The Executioner" Anastasia. Maione reportedly killed at least 12 men while working for Murder, Inc.

== Eliminating potential witnesses ==
In the mid-1930s, New York District Attorney Thomas E. Dewey targeted Buchalter for prosecution. In response, Buchalter started eliminating all potential witnesses. Murder, Inc. killed anyone that Buchalter even suspected of being an informant. Loan shark George "Whitey" Rudnick was one such victim. He was killed by Maione, Abbandando, and Strauss on May 11, 1937.

In 1940, Reles became an informant for the State of New York. He then implicated Maione and Abbandando in the horrific slaying of Rudnick. According to Reles, the men supposedly killed Rudnick and started stuffing him back in their car. Suddenly, the "corpse" started coughing. To finish him off, Strauss stabbed Rudnick 63 times with an ice pick and Maione buried a meat cleaver in his skull.

In May 1940, Maione was convicted of first degree murder, but the verdict was overturned on appeal. After a second trial, Maione was convicted again. This time, the conviction was not overturned by an appeals court. On February 19, 1942, Maione and Frank Abbandando were executed in the electric chair at Sing Sing Prison in Ossining, New York.

== See also ==
- List of people executed in New York
