= Frank Abbandando =

American contract killer and gangster (1910–1942)

- Mug shot taken on March 7, 1940
- Born: July 11, 1910; New York City, U.S.
- Died: February 19, 1942 (aged 31); Sing Sing Prison, New York, U.S.
- Resting place: St. John Cemetery (Queens)
- Other name: The Dasher
- Spouse: Jennie DeLuca (m. 1927)
- Children: 2
- Status: Executed by electrocution
- Allegiance: Murder, Inc.
- Conviction: First degree murder
- Penalty: Death

Frank Abbandando (July 11, 1910 – February 19, 1942), nicknamed "The Dasher", was a New York City contract killer and mobster who committed many murders as part of the infamous Murder, Inc. enforcement arm of the National Crime Syndicate. His preferred killing method was to stab his victims through the heart with an ice pick. After a trial and conviction for murdering a Brooklyn loan shark, he was executed in the electric chair at Sing Sing on February 19, 1942.

== Early years ==
Abbandando's parents, Lorenzo Abbondandolo and Rosaria Famighetti, emigrated from Avellino, Italy, to New York City. He was born in New York on July 11, 1910. Abbandando was one of twelve children (of whom six did not survive childhood).

== Criminal career ==
Abbandando began as a teenager extorting money from shop owners by threatening to torch their shops. By his twenties, he had joined a street gang in the Ocean Hill section of Brooklyn where he quickly became a lieutenant of Harry "Happy" Maione. Abbandando organized gambling, loan sharking, and extortion rackets for the gang, as well as committing murders. In 1928, Abbandando was convicted of beating a New York police officer and was sent to reform school in Elmira, New York, where he demonstrated skill at baseball and received the nickname "The Dasher".

While Abbandando was said to be a connoisseur of fine clothes and fancy cars, he was also a habitual sexual predator who would drive around his neighborhoods of Brownsville and Ocean Hill looking for young women to rape. The prosecutor at his murder trial said that Abbandando had all but admitted one rape, to which Abbandando replied, "Well, that one doesn't count really—I married the girl later."

=== Contract killer ===
In the early 1930s, New York's Five Families began using gangs to commit their murders. This was because they had reformed their operating structures following the vicious, high-profile Castellammarese War which had made front-page news for its brutality. With the new peace, the mobs now wanted to keep a low public profile. By using contract killers, the Five Families were better protected from public and law enforcement scrutiny. These killers were led by Louis "Lepke" Buchalter, the young leader of the Jewish gang known as the "Gorilla Boys".

With the growth in racketeering, Buchalter's small informal network of killers grew into a group of 250 criminals who were also involved in narcotics, labor unions, and other rackets such as gambling and prostitution. Buchalter called his group "The Combination" but the New York Press labeled it "Murder, Inc." Unlike the Five Families, which required members to be of Sicilian or Southern Italian ancestry, Murder Inc. was a diverse ethnic gang that included Jews and Italians.

In the 1920s, Abbandando became associated with Murder Inc. By the early 1930s, he was reputed to have killed at least 30 people, mostly in Brooklyn, for a payment of about $500 per murder. In September 1931, Abbandando helped Buchalter and gang member Abe Reles eliminate the Shapiro Brothers, a rival outfit from the Lower East Side of Manhattan who controlled the garment industry in Brooklyn.

In 1937, Abbandando assisted in the murder of George Rudnick, a loan shark in Brooklyn. Reles had ordered Rudnick's murder because he had received information that Rudnick was a police informant. Using an ice pick and a meat cleaver, Abbandando and several other gang members strangled Rudnick, stabbed him 63 times, and crushed his head inside a garage. No one was arrested for the crime. In February 1939, Abbandando and others killed mobster Felice Esposito. The contract was issued because he had been a prosecution witness in a mob murder trial 17 years earlier.

=== Trial and execution ===
The downfall of Murder, Inc. began in 1940 when Abe Reles turned state witness after being indicted for murder. His testimony against fellow Murder, Inc. members soon led to the arrest of Abbandando for the murder of George Rudnick in 1937. By the early 1940s, Murder, Inc. was severely weakened after the arrests and convictions of its leaders, such as Buchalter and Jacob Shapiro, and top hitmen, such as Charles "The Bug" Workman and Emanuel "Mendy" Weiss.

In May 1940, Abbandando was put on trial for murder along with co-defendants Harry "Happy" Maione and Harry "Pittsburgh Phil" Strauss. Abbandando was so confident that his allies would succeed in fixing the verdict, he even whispered a threat into the judge's ear while he was on the witness stand. To his surprise, they were all convicted of Rudnick's murder, but the verdicts were overturned on appeal.

In April 1941, Abbandando, along with Maione (Strauss had been convicted in September 1940 of killing Jewish mobster Irving Feinstein in 1939), went on trial a second time. This time he was convicted of first-degree murder and sentenced to death. Abbandando spent the next nine months in Sing Sing Prison in Ossining, New York. On February 19, 1942, he was executed using "Old Sparky," the electric chair at Sing Sing. In the moments up to his execution, Abbandando continued to mock and curse his guards. It was reported he displayed no fear and seemed to find a morbid humor in the proceedings.

A mass was said for him at Our Lady of Loretto Church in New York, where his brother Rocco assaulted a news photographer. He was buried in the family plot in St John's Cemetery in Queens, New York City.

== Aftermath ==
After Abbandando's conviction, six other members of Murder, Inc., including Buchalter and Maione, were convicted of murder and executed, based on Reles' testimony. On November 12, 1941, while under police protection, Reles fell out a hotel window in Coney Island. The official ruling was that Reles died trying to climb down bedsheets to the street below. However, it was rumored that the Cosa Nostra raised $100,000 to bribe Reles's guards to shove him out the window.

With Buchalter's death, Albert "Lord High Executioner" Anastasia, a made man in the Cosa Nostra, took over Murder, Inc. As a reaction to government informants in Murder, Inc., the New York crime families started using their own members and associates, who were more easily controlled, to carry out murders. Murder, Inc. soon faded away.

== Personal life ==
Abbandando married Jennie DeLuca, a hairdresser from Ocean Hill, at his parents' urging, in September 1927. He had two sons, Lawrence and Frank Jr. Both became involved in organized crime.

Lawrence was born shortly after his parents' marriage on December 20, 1927. He became a mob associate. He died of cancer in North Miami Beach, Florida on March 25, 1995.

Lawrence's younger brother, Frank Abbandando Jr., was born on October 17, 1935. He was a Gambino crime family associate. He was murdered in Florida on December 22, 1995. The 60-year old mobster was run over as he crossed Biscayne Boulevard in front of Party Girls, a run down strip club he frequented in North Miami Beach, by Rocco Napolitano, the brother of Aniello Napolitano, a small time drug dealer who might have been executed on the orders of Abbandando Jr.

After running him down, Napolitano fired several shots into Abbandando as he lay on the ground. Napolitano told police that he had shot him out of revenge for his brother. He was sentenced to life in prison. Abbandando Jr. was buried in Ocean Hill, Brooklyn.

== See also ==
- Capital punishment in New York
- List of people executed in New York
- List of people executed in the United States in 1942

== Cited works ==
- Flowers, R. Barri; Flowers, H. Loraine (2005). "Male Murderers". Murders in the United States: Crimes, Killers and Victims of the Twentieth Century. McFarland. ISBN 0-7864-2075-8.
- Nash, Jay Robert (1993). World Encyclopedia of Organized Crime. Da Capo Press. ISBN 0-306-80535-9.
- Turkus, Burton B.; Feder, Sid (2003). Murder, Inc.: The Story of "The Syndicate". Da Capo Press. ISBN 0-306-81288-6.
