= Irving Feinstein =

American mobster (1909–1939)

Irving "Puggy" Feinstein (October 6, 1909 – September 5, 1939) was a Jewish-American mobster involved in illegal gambling and labor racketeering with Louis "Lepke" Buchalter. Puggy had made the mistake of attempting to move into turf which was not his own. He was later murdered by several members of Murder, Inc. including Abe Reles, Martin Goldstein, and Harry Strauss.

The murder occurred in the living room of Reles' own house on E. 91 St. in Brooklyn. While Harry Strauss was icepicking Puggy Feinstein to death, Puggy fought back and took a few bites out of Strauss's finger. Irate over the turn of events, Strauss and a few of his coworkers decided to make Feinstein's demise more painful and lengthened. They did so by a process which incorporates a rope being looped around the victim's neck and feet, so that as he struggled, he would slowly strangle himself. Still aggravated over the wound on his finger, Strauss and his associates took the body to a vacant lot and set it on fire.

Strauss was eventually indicted for his murder, due in part to the testimony of Reles, and sentenced to death on May 10, 1939. In his court testimony, Reles explained that the hit was carried out by Murder, Inc. for New York mobster Albert Anastasia. He also said that Puggy had doublecrossed Vincent Mangano, the boss of the Mangano family, which Anastasia belonged to.
