= Whitey Krakow =

American mobster (??–1941)

Whitey Krakow (died July 30, 1941) Born Walter Krakower he was a New York mobster who served as a hitman for Murder, Inc. during the 1930s. Because he had the same surname as Esta Krakower, the wife of fellow Murder, Inc. member Benjamin "Bugsy" Siegel, Whitey was sometimes misidentified as her brother and Bugsy's brother-in-law when, in fact, he was not related to either of them.

Together with Siegel and Frankie Carbo, Whitey was suspected of the 1939 gangland slaying of Harry "Big Greenie" Greenberg. Later implicated by fellow Murder, Inc. members Abe "Kid Twist" Reles and Allie "Tick Tock" Tannenbaum, he was found shot to death on Manhattan's Delancey Street on July 30, 1941, one of the first members of Murder, Inc. to himself be murdered, although he was not the only one. In the months around his death, Benjamin Tannenbaum, Sidney "Shimmy" Salles, Anthony "Tony Romero" Romanello, and possibly James "Dizzy" Ferraco, were also murdered. After this spate of killings, members of Murder, Inc. began surrendering to authorities.
