= Abbandando =

Abbandando is a surname. Notable people with the surname include:

- Frank Abbandando (1910–1942), American contract killer

== Fictional characters ==
- Genco Abbandando, a character in the novel The Godfather
