= Magoon =

Magoon is a surname of Scottish origin, derived from the Scottish Gaelic name Mac Ghobhainn, which means "son of the smith". Notable people with the surname include:

- Charles Edward Magoon (1861–1920), American lawyer, judge, diplomat, and administrator
- Seymour Magoon (1908–?), American hitman in New York's Murder Inc. gang
- George Magoon (1875–1943), American baseball player
- Henry S. Magoon (1832–1889) American politician

== See also ==
- Meet the Magoons, six part comedy television series in the United Kingdom aired on Channel 4 in 2005
- McGowan
