= Benjamin Tannenbaum =

American mobster

- Born: c. 1906
- Died: February 6, 1941 (aged 34–35)
- Cause of death: Assassination by gunshot
- Other name: Benny the Boss
- Allegiance: Louis "Lepke" Buchalter and Jacob "Gurrah" Shapiro

Benjamin "Benny the Boss" Tannenbaum (c. 1906 – February 6, 1941) was a New York mobster involved in narcotics and the fur rackets as well as a mob accountant for labor racketeer Louis "Lepke" Buchalter and Jacob "Gurrah" Shapiro.

== Biography ==
A friend of Bronx real estate agent Max Heitner, whom he had met at a New York summer resort, Tannenbaum was shot twice in the chest and killed while babysitting Heitner's four-month-old baby. Seymour "Blue Jaw" Magoon, a member of Murder, Inc., was later brought into custody for Tannenbaum's murder. It has been speculated, as he had knowledge of Charles "The Bug" Workman's role in the 1935 gangland slaying of Dutch Schultz, that Tannenbaum may have been targeted as a potential informant during District Attorney Thomas E. Dewey's prosecution against Louis Buchalter.
