= Half Moon Hotel =

Former hotel in Brooklyn, New York

Coordinates: 40.5755°N 73.9951°W

The Half Moon Hotel, in Coney Island, Brooklyn, New York, United States, was a 225-foot-tall, 14-story hotel that opened on May 5, 1927, on the Riegelmann Boardwalk at West 29th Street. The Half Moon was built to help Coney Island compete with the beach resort Atlantic City, New Jersey. The hotel was designed by the architectural firm of George B. Post and Sons and built by the Cauldwell-Wingate Co.

It is known as the location where Abe Reles, informant for the FBI who brought down numerous members of Murder, Inc., either jumped, fell or was pushed to his death on November 12, 1941, from room 623, where he was in protective custody of the New York City Police Department, a few hours before he was scheduled to testify against Albert Anastasia. Reles's death signified the reach that organized crime had into the police department – he was guarded by six police detectives.

The name "Half Moon" refers to the name of explorer Henry Hudson's ship, which anchored off Gravesend Bay in Brooklyn, while searching for a short cut to Asia.

During World War II, the hotel was operated by the U.S. Navy and became known as the U. S. Naval Special Hospital Sea Gate, NY, a convalescent hospital.

In the 1950s, it became a senior-citizens' home called the Metropolitan Jewish Geriatric Center. The center moved to another building and the building was demolished in 1995. Today, the Seagate Rehabilitation and Nursing Center is on the site.
