= Murder, Inc. =

American organized crime groups in the 1930s and 1940s

- Founding location: New York City, New York
- Years active: 1929–1941
- Territory: United States
- Ethnicity: Italian Americans; Jewish Americans
- Criminal activities: Murder, illegal gambling, prostitution, theft, money laundering, arms trafficking, fraud, fencing, kidnapping, robbery

Murder, Inc. (Murder, Incorporated), also known as the Combination, was an organized crime group active from 1929 to 1941 that acted as the enforcement arm of the National Crime Syndicate – a closely connected criminal organization that included the Italian-American Mafia, the Jewish Mob, and other criminal organizations in New York City and elsewhere. Murder, Inc. was composed of both Jewish-American and Italian-American gangsters, and members were mainly recruited from poor and working-class Jewish and Italian neighborhoods in Manhattan and Brooklyn. It was initially headed by Louis "Lepke" Buchalter and later by Albert "Mad Hatter" Anastasia.

Murder, Inc. was believed to be responsible for between 400 and 1,000 contract killings, until the group was exposed in 1941 by former member Abe "Kid Twist" Reles. In the trials that followed, many members were convicted and executed, and Reles himself died after suspiciously falling from a window. Thomas E. Dewey first came to prominence as a prosecutor of Murder, Inc. and other organized crime cases, before being elected the 47th governor of New York.

== Origins ==
The Bugs and Meyer Mob was the predecessor to Murder, Incorporated. The gang was founded by New York Jewish mobsters Meyer Lansky and Bugsy Siegel in the early 1920s. Sicilian mafioso Charles "Lucky" Luciano created The Commission and began to closely cooperate with his friend Lansky and the Jewish Mob in general, establishing a multi-ethnic alliance that eventually was deemed the "National Crime Syndicate". Soon after, Siegel and Lansky disbanded the Bugs and Meyer gang and helped form Murder, Incorporated.

== Methods ==
Members of Murder, Inc. were Italian and Jewish gangsters from the gangs of the Lower East Side and the Brooklyn neighborhoods of Brownsville, East New York, and Ocean Hill. They committed crimes in New York City, acting as enforcers for New York Jewish mobster Louis "Lepke" Buchalter, and they accepted murder contracts from mob bosses all around the United States.

Murder, Inc. was based in Rosie Gold's candy store at the corner of Saratoga and Livonia Ave in Brooklyn. The group had a number of members, although Harry Strauss was the most prolific killer, committing over 100 murders—and some historians put the number as high as 500.

The killers were paid a regular salary as retainer as well as an average fee of $1,000 to $5,000 per killing. Their families also received monetary benefits.

== Founding and early activities ==
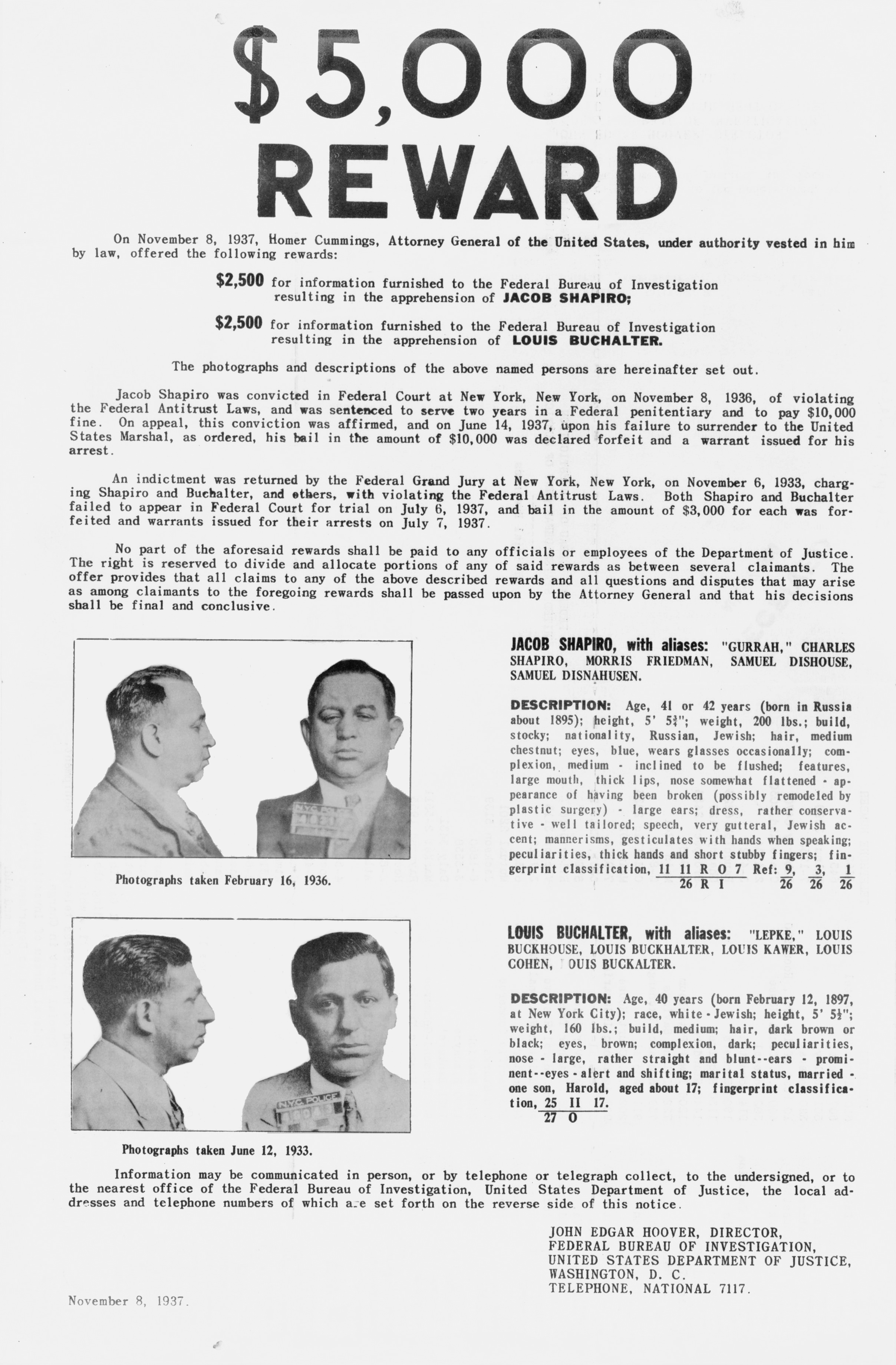
An FBI wanted poster for Jacob Shapiro and Louis Buchalter (1937)

Murder, Inc. was established after the formation of the commission of the National Crime Syndicate, to which it ultimately answered. It was largely headed by mob boss Louis "Lepke" Buchalter and Mangano Family underboss Albert Anastasia, but also had members from Buchalter's labor-slugging gang (in partnership with Tommy "Three-Fingered Brown" Lucchese) as well as from another group of enforcers from Brownsville, Brooklyn, New York led by Martin "Buggsy" Goldstein and Abe "Kid Twist" Reles. Buchalter, in particular, and Joe Adonis occasionally, gave the outfit its orders from the board of directors of the syndicate. Albert "The Mad Hatter" Anastasia was the troupe's operating head, or "Lord High Executioner", assisted by Lepke's longtime associate Jacob "Gurrah" Shapiro.

In 1932, Abe Wagner informed on the crime syndicate to the police. He fled to Saint Paul, Minnesota, and adopted a disguise to evade possible pursuit. Two killers, George Young and Joseph Schafer, found and shot him but were later apprehended. Bugsy Siegel failed to get them released.

In the 1930s, Buchalter used Murder, Inc. to murder witnesses and suspected informants when he was being investigated by crusading prosecutor Thomas Dewey. In one case on May 25, 1937, four killers garroted George Rudnick with a sash cord and stabbed him multiple times with an ice pick on the mere suspicion he was an informant. On October 1, 1937, they shot and seriously wounded Buchalter's ex-associate Max Rubin. Rubin had disobeyed Buchalter's orders to leave town and "disappear" in order to avoid being summoned as a witness against Buchalter. Three alleged victims of Murder, Inc. in 1935 were Morris Kessler and brothers Louis and Joseph Amberg.

=== Murder of Dutch Schultz ===
Murder, Inc's best known victim was most likely Dutch Schultz, who had openly defied the syndicate. In October 1935, Schultz insisted on putting a contract on Thomas E. Dewey, who was leading an all-out effort to put the mob out of business, but the syndicate board overruled him, as non-mafia members were considered off limits. They also feared that Dewey's assassination would incite public outrage and result in an even greater campaign to shut down the rackets. Schultz vowed that he would ignore the board's decision and kill Dewey himself.

Hitmen Mendy Weiss and Charles Workman were given the assignment to kill Schultz. On October 24, 1935, they tracked down Schultz and his associates Otto Berman, Abe Landau, and Lulu Rosenkrantz and shot them at the Palace Chop House in Newark, New Jersey. Berman, Landau, and Rosenkrantz died almost immediately, while Schultz clung to life until the following day. Workman stayed behind while Weiss escaped with their driver Seymour Schechter. In 1944, Weiss was executed by electric chair for another murder. Workman was eventually tried by the State of New Jersey for the Schultz murder and served 23 years in prison.

== Demise ==
In January 1940, professional criminal and police informer Harry Rudolph was held as a material witness in the murder of 19-year-old minor gangster Alex Alpert. Alpert was shot in the back on a street corner in the Brownsville section of Brooklyn on November 25, 1933. While in custody, Rudolph talked with Brooklyn District Attorney William O'Dwyer. With Rudolph's testimony, O'Dwyer secured first-degree murder indictments against Abe Reles, Martin Goldstein, and Anthony Maffetore.

After the three were indicted, O'Dwyer learned from Special Prosecutor John Harlan Amen that Rudolph was reportedly offered a $5,000 bribe by another prisoner, on behalf of the syndicate, to "put Reles and Goldstein on the street". O'Dwyer stated that when Maffetore learned of the bribe offer to help clear Reles and Goldstein and after several talks with New York City Detective John Osnato, he decided to turn state's evidence. Detective Osnato talked with Maffetore even though he had worked with Rudolph previously and did not put much credibility in his story since Rudolph was paid for information in other cases that turned out to be false.

Eventually, Maffetore decided to cooperate, stating that he was not involved in the Alpert murder, but was the driver in six gangland murders. Maffetore then convinced Abraham Levine to talk. Reles was next to cooperate with the District Attorney's office. After Reles agreed to cooperate, numerous first-degree murder indictments were issued in Brooklyn, the Bronx, and in upstate Sullivan County (Catskills). Additional members of the "Combination" then were added to the list of cooperating witnesses, including Albert Tannenbaum, Seymour Magoon, and Sholem Bernstein. Harry Rudolph's testimony was never used in any of the trials, as he died of natural causes in the infirmary at Rikers Island in June 1940. Abe Reles fell to his death from a room at the Half Moon Hotel in Coney Island on November 12, 1941, even though he was under police guard. The official verdict was accidental death.

== Trials ==
=== Harry Maione and Frank Abbandando ===
Harry Maione and Frank Abbandando were the first members of the Brooklyn "Combination" to be put on trial for murder. In May 1940, the trial started for the May 25, 1937 ice-pick murder of George "Whitey" Rudnick in a Brooklyn parking garage. Harry Strauss was also indicted for the murder, and, after initially agreeing to cooperate with the District Attorney's office, he was severed from the trial. On May 15, 1940, Abe Reles testified that Rudnick was marked for death after Strauss claimed he had obtained information that Rudnick was a "stool pigeon for the police." Reles also testified that he waited outside the garage while Maione, Abbandando and Strauss were inside with Rudnick. After Rudnick was believed to have been murdered, Abbandando called for Reles and summoned Angelo "Julie" Catalano to the garage to assist with moving the body. Since Rudnick was still alive, Strauss resumed his assault with an ice pick, and Maione used a meat cleaver to complete the murder. The next day, Catalano, who drove the automobile with Rudnick's body, corroborated Reles' account of the murder. "Dukey" Maffetore and Abe "Pretty" Levine testified that they stole the automobile that was used to dispose of the body. Maione and 14 witnesses testified that he was at his grandmother's wake when Rudnick was murdered. The funeral home undertaker and embalmer testified that Maione was not at the wake. Also, one of Maione's chief witnesses admitted that he committed perjury as ordered by Maione's brother, whom he feared.

On May 23, 1940, Maione and Abbandando were convicted of first-degree murder, which meant a mandatory sentence of death in the electric chair. New York's highest court, the Court of Appeals, overturned the conviction on a 4–3 vote in December 1940. The second trial started on March 10, 1941. At one point during the trial, Maione lost his temper and threw a glass of water at Reles. Maione and Abbandando were convicted of first-degree murder for a second time on April 3, 1941. Maione and Abbandando were formally sentenced to death for a second time on April 14, 1941. The Court of Appeals upheld the second conviction on January 8, 1942. Maione and Abbandando were executed at Sing Sing prison on February 19, 1942.

=== Harry Strauss and Martin Goldstein ===
Harry Strauss and Martin Goldstein were put on trial for the September 4, 1939, strangulation murder of bookmaker Irving Feinstein, whose body was set on fire and left in a vacant lot after Feinstein had been strangled. The trial started in September 1940 with Strauss feigning insanity. Abe Reles, the chief prosecution witness, testified that Feinstein was murdered on orders of Albert Anastasia, since he supposedly "crossed" Vincent Mangano. Reles testified that he, Goldstein and Strauss murdered Feinstein in his house. Reles's mother-in-law also testified that Reles and Strauss had asked her for an ice pick and clothesline earlier in the day and, while at the house, heard loud music masking a commotion in the living room. She also testified hearing Strauss say that he had been bitten. Goldstein's former bodyguard/driver Seymour Magoon corroborated the story, as he testified that on the night of the murder, Goldstein told him that he along with Reles and Strauss had murdered Puggy Feinstein and that shortly after the crime was committed, Goldstein and "Duke" Maffetore burned the body. Goldstein's attorney decided not to put up a defense. Strauss's attorney claimed his client was insane. Strauss was briefly allowed on the witness stand but refused to take his oath and was "babbling incoherently" as he was led back to the defense table. Strauss then began chewing on a leather strap of a briefcase. On September 19, 1940, Strauss and Goldstein were convicted of first-degree murder and a week later sentenced to death in the electric chair. On April 24, 1941, Strauss and Goldstein's convictions were affirmed by New York's Court of Appeals on a 4–3 decision. Strauss and Goldstein were executed in the electric chair on June 12, 1941.

=== Charles Workman ===
Charles Workman was indicted in New Jersey on March 27, 1940, for the October 23, 1935, murder of Dutch Schultz and three members of his gang. Workman was extradited to New Jersey in April 1941. The trial, which opened in June 1941, featured testimony from Abe Reles and Albert Tannenbaum as the primary underworld witnesses against Workman. The trial opened with two state witnesses, the restaurant bartender and a woman who was outside the restaurant, failing to identify Workman. The next day, Reles and Tannenbaum provided their testimony implicating Workman. Next, a female friend of slain gangster Danny Fields, who was described as a "collector for the payroll" of Lepke, testified that Workman showed up at her apartment the day after Schultz's murder and asked Fields to burn his clothes. The woman, who used a pseudonym on the witness stand, testified that Workman openly talked about the Schultz killing and how he was left behind in the restaurant. Workman's defense opened with testimony from Marty Krompier, a close associate of Dutch Schultz who was shot in Manhattan the same night Schultz was murdered in New Jersey. Krompier testified that Tannenbaum told him that he did not shoot him as he was in New Jersey and killed Schultz. Workman, in the middle of his defense, changed his plea from 'not guilty' to 'no contest' after one of his chief defense witnesses, a Manhattan funeral director who testified that Workman was employed by him during the time of the Schultz murder and who was the brother-in-law of the late Lepke associate Danny Fields, recanted his testimony that had provided Workman with an alibi. The same day Workman changed his plea, he was sentenced to life in prison. Workman was paroled on March 10, 1964, after serving 23 years in prison.

=== Irving Nitzberg ===
Irving Nitzberg, who was "imported" by the Brooklyn "Combination" from the Bronx, was put on trial for the January 9, 1939, murder of Albert Shuman in Brooklyn based on the testimony of three accomplices, Abe Reles, Albert Tannenbaum and Seymour Magoon. Reles testified that Shuman was killed since he cooperated with the authorities who were conducting an inquiry of Lepke's involvement in labor racketeering. Reles also testified that he helped plan the murder of Shuman with Lepke, who was a fugitive at the time, and Mendy Weiss and that Lepke received approval from Albert Anastasia to use a person who lived outside Brooklyn to help with completing the assignment. Seymour Magoon testified that he stole the car used in the murder on Reles's orders. Albert Tannenbaum testified that he was the driver that picked up Nitzberg and Shuman under the pretense of performing a robbery. Nitzberg, who was in the back seat, shot Shuman twice in the back of the head when Tannenbaum gave a predetermined signal. Tannenbaum and Nitzberg then exited the murder car to join Reles and another gangster in the getaway car and departed from the crime scene. Nitzberg was convicted of first-degree murder on May 23, 1941, and sentenced to death in the electric chair. However, on December 10, 1941, the conviction was overturned on a 4–3 vote by New York's Court of Appeals, which questioned the use of testimony of non-accomplice witnesses who were promised leniency to support the testimony of Reles, Tannenbaum and Magoon. Nitzberg was tried a second time in 1942 with the now-deceased Reles's testimony read to the jury. Nitzberg was convicted for a second time on March 12, 1942. The conviction was overturned again by the Court of Appeals on a 4–3 vote, but, this time, the court also dismissed the indictment as faulty since the only testimony presented to the grand jury was from accomplices without corroboration.

=== Louis Buchalter, Emanuel Weiss, Louis Capone, Harry Strauss, James Feraco and Philip Cohen ===
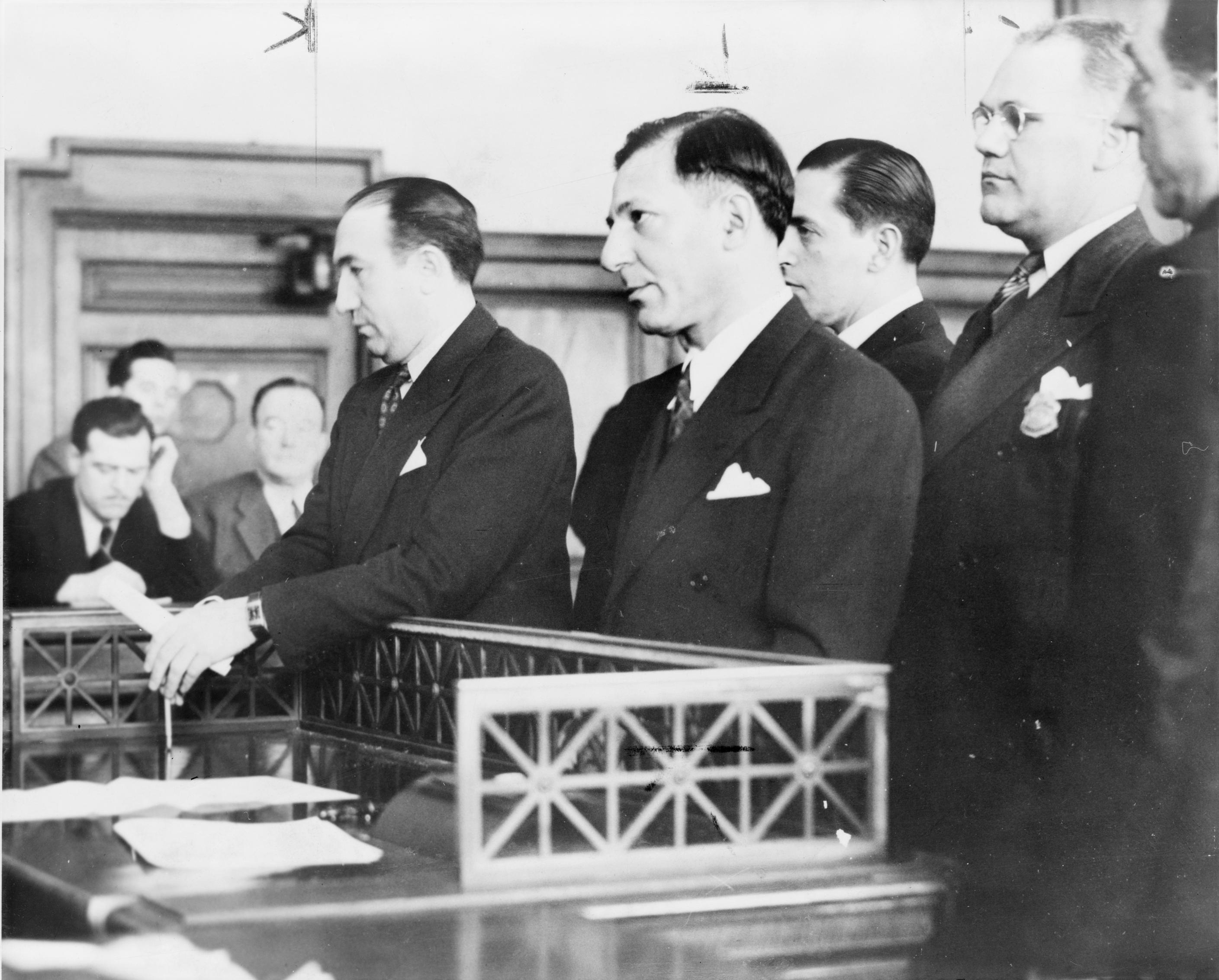
Louis "Lepke" Buchalter, standing in court during sentencing, December 2, 1941

Louis Buchalter, Emanuel Weiss, Louis Capone, Harry Strauss, Philip Cohen, and James Feraco went on trial August 5, 1941. Cohen had his murder indictment dropped prior to the start of the trial after his conviction on a federal narcotics charge and received a 10-year sentence. James Feraco had vanished without a trace and was presumably killed in 1940 or 1941, and Harry Strauss had already been executed for the murder of Irving Feinstein. Jury selection for the trial began in August 1941. However, securing a jury for Lepke proved difficult. After enough jurors were finally selected, the trial actually started in October 1941. The trial featured the testimony of Rosen's wife and son, a teacher, and underworld turncoat Sholem Bernstein, who was marked for death after refusing to carry out a murder contract on Irving Cohen, who fled to California after the murder of Walter Sage in 1937 in Swan Lake, New York. Lepke, Weiss and Capone were convicted on November 30, 1941. The Court of Appeals upheld the murder convictions of Lepke, Weiss and Capone in October 1942 on a 4–3 vote. The U.S. Supreme Court refused to hear Lepke's appeal in February 1943. In March 1943, the Supreme Court reversed its earlier decision and granted a review to Lepke, Weiss and Capone. The Supreme Court upheld the conviction in June 1943. Before Lepke could be executed, New York State needed the federal government to turn Lepke over, as he was currently serving a 14-year sentence in federal prison. Lepke continued to appeal his death sentence vigorously in New York and transfer from federal custody. Lepke, Weiss and Capone were executed in Sing-Sing prison on March 4, 1944.

=== Vito Gurino ===
Vito "Socko" Gurino was sought for questioning in the Brooklyn murder investigation as the member assigned to eliminate witnesses against the "Combination". First, Gurino attempted to silence a small-time gangster and eyewitness to the George Rudnick murder. Police picked up Angelo "Julie" Catalano on the streets of Brooklyn shortly after he was bailed out by the syndicate, as Gurino tried to convince him to "hide out" on Long Island. Several days later, Gurino used a contact, corrupt Queens County Deputy Sheriff William Cassele, to enter the county's civil prison on the night of March 29, 1940. Cassele then forced Joseph "Joe the Baker" Liberto, who was being held as a material witness in the George Rudnick murder, to meet with Gurino. According to Liberto, he was pushed up against a wall in his cell and threatened with death if he cooperated with the District Attorney. Liberto was taken into custody shortly after an acquaintance drove him to a farmhouse on Long Island. Liberto quickly exited through a window, convinced he was going to be killed. Gurino, who was hiding out in New Jersey for much of 1940, was arrested on September 12, 1940, at the Church of the Guardian Angel in Manhattan, screaming hysterically in fear for his life. Shortly after being arrested, Gurino confessed to three syndicate murders and implicated himself in four others. In March 1942, Gurino pleaded guilty to three murders. In April 1942, Gurino was sentenced to 80 years to life in prison. He died of a heart ailment on April 22, 1957, at Dannemora Hospital for the Criminally Insane.

=== Jacob Drucker and Irving Cohen ===
Jacob Drucker and Irving Cohen were put on trial separately for the murder of racketeer Walter Sage in the Catskills. Sage was killed with an ice pick and had the frame of a slot machine and a 30 pound rock tied to his body. He floated to the surface and was found in Swan Lake, New York on July 31, 1937 by tourists. After the Sage murder, believing he was also going to be killed, Cohen fled to California and managed to secure small roles in films. He was identified two years later by the chief prosecution witness, Abraham Levine, who spotted Cohen in one of the ringside crowd scenes in the 1939 film Golden Boy. According to Levine, Sage was riding in a car with Cohen and Drucker when he was stabbed 32 times with an icepick as Levine and Harry Strauss were following in another car. During the assault and struggle, Drucker stabbed Cohen once in the arm as Sage had grabbed the steering wheel and wrecked the car. Levine also testified that he observed Drucker wiping the icepick clean before helping dispose of the body. Cohen testified in his own defense, stating that Levine had stabbed him with an icepick as he was walking home from a casino. Cohen stated that he was assaulted by Levine and another man on Drucker's orders since he refused to pay 25% profit on a game of chance that he operated. Cohen was acquitted on June 21, 1940. Drucker, who was a suspect in four murders in the Catskills, was a fugitive for over three years, until the FBI located him in Delaware. Drucker was convicted of second-degree murder on May 5, 1944, and received a sentence of 25 years to life. Drucker died in Attica prison in January 1962.

=== Jack Parisi ===
Jack "the Dandy" Parisi was acquitted of two murders, Teamsters official Morris Diamond in Brooklyn and music-publishing executive Irving Penn in the Bronx. Penn was killed by mistaken identity, as the intended target, Philip Orlofsky, a Cutters Union official, left his home early to get a shave the day his killers waited for him. Parisi was a fugitive for 10 years, until he was captured in Pennsylvania in 1949. Albert Tannenbaum was brought in from Atlanta, where he was reportedly living, to testify for the prosecution. One accomplice in the Penn murder, Jacob "Kuppy" Migden, who provided the erroneous identification of Penn and who was also a fugitive for several years, pleaded guilty to attempted first-degree assault in the middle of his murder trial and was sentenced to a term of 5–10 years. Each of Parisi's murder trials ended with an acquittal, as the judges directed a verdict of not-guilty due to the lack of corroborating evidence, since the chief witnesses for the prosecution were accomplices. He died at home of natural causes on December 27, 1982, at the age of 83.

=== Others ===
Max "the Jerk" Golob was indicted with Frank Abbandando for first-degree murder in the slaying of gangster John "Spider" Murtha on March 3, 1935. With little evidence other than the eyewitness testimony of Murtha's female companion, Golob was permitted to plead guilty to second-degree assault and received a maximum term of five years.

Sidney "Fats" Brown was the subject of a sealed first-degree murder indictment in Sullivan County, New York. The indictment was dismissed after the death of Abe Reles, the sole witness. Brown was never arrested, and the identity of the murder victim was never revealed.

== After the trials ==
With many of its members executed or imprisoned, Murder, Inc., vanished within a few years.

- In 1942, Duke Maffetore and Pretty Levine received suspended sentences after pleading guilty to petty larceny in the theft of an automobile used in a gangland murder.
- In June 1944, NYPD Lieutenant John Osnato, who convinced Duke Maffetore to cooperate with the Brooklyn District Attorney's office, retired after 28 years on the police force. On November 25, 1945, he died of a heart ailment at age 55.
- In 1949, Philip Cohen was murdered, several months after being released from federal prison. He had served seven years of a 10-year sentence for narcotics trafficking.
- In October 1950, 37-year-old Anthony Maffetore was arrested for grand larceny as a member of a nationwide auto-theft ring. On March 7, 1951, he disappeared, missed a scheduled appearance in Queens County Court, and was presumed murdered.
- On October 25, 1957, Albert Anastasia, dubbed in the media the "Lord High Executioner of Murder Inc.", was shot and killed in a barber shop at the Park Sheraton Hotel, in Manhattan. Shortly after Anastasia's murder, East Coast organized criminals held a meeting in Apalachin, New York, to distribute Anastasia's rackets, according to law enforcement.

== Known members ==
- Lepke Buchalter – original head of Murder, Inc.
- Bugsy Siegel – a founder and leading member
- Albert Anastasia – Succeeded Buchalter until he became boss of the Gambino crime family
- Frank Abbandando
- Louis Capone
- Frankie Carbo
- Louis Cohen
- Philip "Little Farvel" Cohen
- Aniello Dellacroce
- Isadore Friedman
- Martin Goldstein
- Hyman Holtz
- Whitey Krakow
- Lou Kravitz
- Philip Kovolick
- Samuel Levine
- Seymour Magoon
- Harry Maione
- Abe Reles
- Jacob Shapiro
- Harry Strauss
- Albert Tannenbaum
- Benjamin Tannenbaum
- Emanuel Weiss

== In popular culture ==
Fashion

- Murder, Inc.'s name featured on the leather jacket of a crew member of a USAAF B-17 that was shot down over Nazi Germany on 26 November 1943. The jacket's artwork was photographed and circulated around the world by German Propaganda Minister Joseph Goebbels and Adolf Hitler, who condemned the use of "gangster language" on the uniform of a soldier.

Films

- In the Merrie Melodies cartoon infamous for its darky iconography, Coal Black and de Sebben Dwarfs (1943), the Queen orders Murder, Inc. to "blackout So White" (a pun on "Snow White"). When Murder, Inc. arrives, their van reads: "We rub out anybody $1.00. Midgets—1/2 price. Japs—FREE."
- The Twentieth Century Fox film Murder, Inc. (1960) was written for the screen by Irve Tunick and Mel Barr from the book by Burton Turkus and Sid Feder, starred Stuart Whitman, Henry Morgan, and Peter Falk, and was directed by Stuart Rosenberg.
- The film The Enforcer (1951), starring Humphrey Bogart and based on the Murder, Inc. trials with advice from Burton Turkus.
- Some characters from the film The Godfather (1972) are revealed to have been members of Murder Inc., which is revealed to be the execution armed wing of the Roth Syndicate, a powerful Jewish-American crime syndicate whose leader, Hyman Roth is a former head of Murder. Inc. Other important members of Murder Inc. in the Godfather universe include:
  - Sam Roth (Hyman Roth's brother and one of his right-hand men)
  - Johnny Ola (a Sicilian mobster and one of Hyman Roth's right-hand men)
  - Moe Greene (Las Vegas-born racketeer, casino hotel owner and former lieutenant of the Roth Syndicate).

Music

- "Murder Incorporated" is a Bruce Springsteen song from his Greatest Hits album (1995). The song was originally recorded in 1982 for the Born in the U.S.A. sessions but was unused on that album.
- Murder Inc. Records, founded by Irv Gotti, is named after the criminal collective.
- Hip-hop and rap artists Jay-Z, DMX, and Ja Rule formed the Murder Inc. rap group, active between 1995 and 2000, with the name inspired by the original Murder Inc. The deadly feud between the Murder Inc. rap group, The Source magazine owner Benzino, 50 Cent, and hip-hop artist Eminem comprised the core subject of the latter's single, "Like Toy Soldiers"

Television

- In the 2017 television series S.W.A.T., Tre (played by Amin Joseph), a professional hitman for hire, names his modern-day service Murder LLC in honor of Murder, Inc.
- In The Simpsons episode, "In the Name of the Grandfather" (2010), Grampa calls out the family for forgetting to visit him, saying: "I was as lonely as Estes Kefauver at a meeting of Murder Incorporated." The family stares at him blankly, and he replies: "That actually makes sense! Look it up!"
- In the 2020 television series Penny Dreadful: City of Angels Murder, Inc. is referred to as the organization to which the recurring character Benny Berman belongs. Meyer Lansky is referred to by name.
- In the TV show The West Wing, Toby Ziegler's father is portrayed as a former member of Murder, Inc.
- In the television series The Sopranos, Murder, Inc. is referenced in the episode "The Legend of Tennessee Moltisanti".

Books

- Murder Inc – The Story of the Syndicate (1951), Burton Turkus and Sid Feder

Poetry

- In his poem Memories of West Street and Lepke (1976), Robert Lowell discusses his experience of having been jailed as a conscientious observer and having encountered Lepke of Murder, Incorporated in prison.
