= Seymour Magoon =

American mobster

Sigmund "Seymour" Magoon (April 21, 1908, New York City – September 25, 1971), known as "Blue Jaw", was an American hitman in New York's Murder, Inc. gang, one of many members who were implicated by the testimony of former member and government informant Abe "Kid Twist" Reles.

A longtime member of Murder, Inc., Magoon was heavily involved in the painters' unions with Martin "Buggsy" Goldstein during the 1920s and 1930s. Magoon helped testify against the other members of Murder, Inc., along with Albert "Tick Tock" Tannenbaum and Sholem Bernstein.

Magoon had been born to a middle-class Jewish family, son to Phillip Magoon and Annie Levinson Magoon, both of whom reported on their 1905 New York City marriage certificate that they were born in "Russia". His uncle Bernard, a physician, reported their family had immigrated to the US from Vilna (now Vilnius, Lithuania) around 1892, and both his parents and his uncle and aunt are buried in a Vilna landsmanschaften section (United Wilner Benevolent Association) of a Jewish cemetery in New York. His paternal grandfather Berman (Bearman) Benjamin Magoon had also been a barber (then an unofficial sort of physician or surgeon) in London.

He married Lillian Smolensky in 1933. He was a fish wholesaler in Chicago in 1950. He died on September 25, 1971, in Cook County, Illinois and Lillian died on September 29, 1988, also in Cook County, Illinois. However, it is unclear when and where he and his wife were buried. At least one of their children eventually changed the spelling of their surname to Magon, as per their tombstone.

== Cultural reference ==
- The U.S. TV series Las Vegas season 3 episode 4, is titled "Whatever Happened to Seymour Magoon?"
