= Martin Goldstein =

American hitman

- Mugshot on February 2, 1940
- Born: 1905; Brooklyn, New York, U.S.
- Died: June 12, 1941 (aged 35–36); Sing Sing Prison, New York, U.S.
- Other name: Buggsy
- Occupation: Hitman
- Status: Executed by electrocution
- Allegiance: Murder, Inc.
- Conviction: First degree murder
- Penalty: Death

Martin "Buggsy" Goldstein (February 12, 1905 – June 12, 1941) was a member of a gang of hitmen, operating out of Brooklyn, New York in the 1930s, known as Murder, Inc.

Born Meyer Goldstein, Goldstein grew up in East New York, Brooklyn, New York, and initially led the crime syndicate Murder, Inc. together with Abe "Kid Twist" Reles. Goldstein later committed murders under the orders of Lepke Buchalter and Albert "Mad Hatter" Anastasia.

Around midnight on June 12, 1941, Goldstein and Harry Strauss were executed by electric chair at Sing Sing prison.

== See also ==
- Capital punishment in New York
- List of people executed in New York
- List of people executed in the United States in 1941
