= Albert Tannenbaum =

Jewish-American hitman (1906–1976)

- Born: January 17, 1906; Nanticoke, Pennsylvania, United States
- Died: November 1976 (aged 69–70); United States
- Occupation: Hitman
- Known for: Mob activity

Albert Tannenbaum (January 17, 1906 – November 1976), nicknamed Allie or Tick-Tock, was a Jewish-American hitman for Murder, Inc., the enforcement arm of the National Crime Syndicate, during the 1930s.

Tannenbaum was born in Nanticoke, Pennsylvania, to Sam and Anna Tannenbaum (née Schwartz), and moved to the Lower East Side of Manhattan at the age of three; his family later relocated to Brooklyn. He quit school at the age of 17 to work as a stock boy in the garment district. After a stint as a salesman, he began work at the Loch Sheldrake Country Club, which was owned by his father. When Tannenbaum was 25, he met a guest at the club by the name of Jacob "Gurrah" Shapiro, a close associate of Jewish gangster Lepke Buchalter. Shapiro felt that Tannenbaum had what it took to become a mob hitman, and introduced him to the underworld.

Tannenbaum progressed rapidly through the ranks of organized criminal violence. He began as an enforcer and strikebreaker being paid $50 a week; his salary was raised to $75 and then later to $100. When he became a full-fledged contract killer in Murder, Inc., he was paid $125 a week for his services.

Perhaps the most famous murder committed by Tannenbaum as a member of Murder, Inc. was that of Harry Greenberg, nicknamed "Big Greenie", in Los Angeles on November 22, 1939. Tannenbaum had been assigned to the hit by Buchalter, who at the time was on the lam from New York District Attorney Thomas E. Dewey and was trying to eliminate potential witnesses that Dewey could use. Tannenbaum followed Greenberg first to Montreal and then to Detroit before finally catching up to him in Los Angeles and killing him under the supervision of (and with the assistance of) the Syndicate's West Coast representative, Bugsy Siegel. Tannenbaum's slaying of Greenberg is generally regarded as the first-ever mob assassination in Southern California.

However, in 1940, under pressure from Brooklyn authorities, Tannenbaum became a "stool pigeon" himself, testifying in Buchalter's trial about the involvement of Lepke and Charles Workman in the murder of Dutch Schultz, among others.

In 1950, Tannenbaum testified in the murder trial of Jack Parisi. He lived in Atlanta.
