= Abe Reles =

American mobster and informant (1906-1941)

Abraham Reles
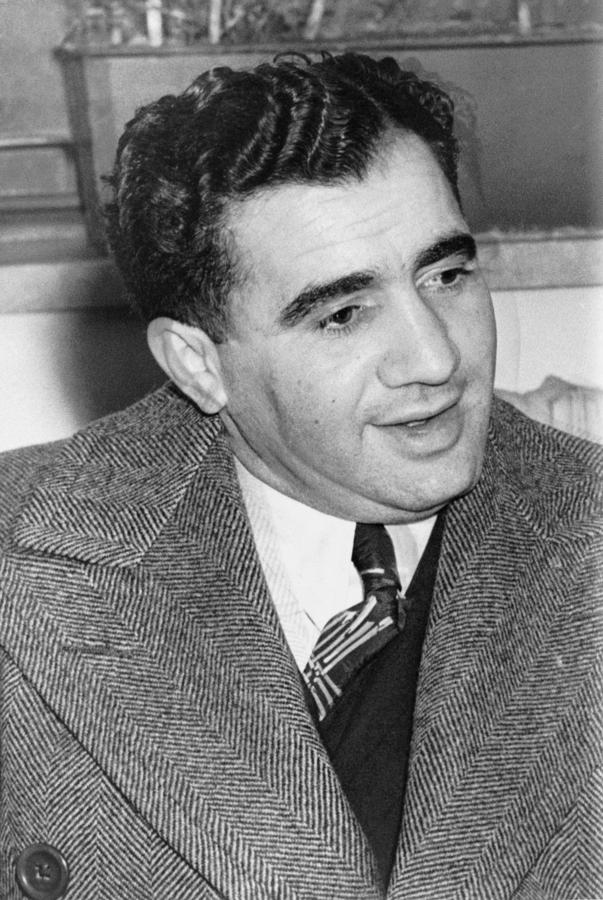
- Reles c. 1935
- Born: Abraham Reles; May 10, 1906; Brooklyn, New York, U.S.
- Died: November 12, 1941 (aged 35); Brooklyn, New York, U.S.
- Cause of death: Fall
- Resting place: Mount Carmel Cemetery
- Other name: Kid Twist
- Occupations: Mobster, Hitman
- Spouse: Rosie Kirsch
- Children: 2
- Parent(s): Samuel and Rose Reles
- Relatives: Max Reles (brother); Bessie Reles (sister); Esther Reles (sister)

Abraham "Kid Twist" Reles (/ˈrɛlɪs/; May 10, 1906 – November 12, 1941) was a New York Jewish mobster who was a hitman for Murder, Inc., the enforcement contractor for the Mafia's National Crime Syndicate.

Reles later turned government witness and sent several members of Murder, Inc. to the electric chair. Reles's death from falling through a window while in police custody might have been a hit placed by the American Mafia, as he was set to testify against Gambino crime family underboss and future boss Albert Anastasia.

== Early years ==
Abraham Reles, the son of Jewish immigrants from Galicia, was born in the Brownsville neighborhood of Brooklyn, New York, on May 10, 1906. His father, Sam, worked in one of the garment trades until sometime during the Great Depression. His father's last known occupation was peddling knishes on the streets of Brownsville. His full formal Hebrew name was Elkanah ben Shimon.

Reles attended school through the eighth grade. After leaving school, he began hanging out at pool rooms and candy stores in and around Brownsville. He soon teamed up with two of his childhood friends, Martin "Buggsy" Goldstein and Harry "Pittsburgh Phil" Strauss, who eventually rose to power with him in the group conventionally known as Murder, Inc. His first arrest came in 1921 for stealing $2 worth of gum from a vending machine, and he was sent to the Children's Village at Dobbs Ferry, New York, for four months.

Reles's small physical size did not deter him from committing ruthless acts of violence. When carrying out murders, his weapon of choice was an ice pick, which he would ram through his victim's ear into the brain. On one occasion, in broad daylight, he attacked a worker at a car wash for failing to clean a smudge from the fender of his car. Another time, Reles killed a parking lot attendant for failing to fetch his car fast enough. One night, according to journalist Rich Cohen, he and Harry Strauss with the help of Buggsy and Dukey murdered "Puggy" Feinstein in Kid Twist's house. Before the murder, they dismissed his wife and Buggsy's wife, giving them fifty dollars each. His mother-in-law was still sleeping in the back of the house, which he believed would be no problem, but before the victim arrived, he had to wake her up to ask where there was a rope and where the ice pick was.

== Prohibition and Murder, Inc. ==
During the Prohibition days of the 1920s, while still teenagers, Reles and Goldstein went to work for the Shapiro brothers, who ran the Brooklyn rackets. Soon Reles and Goldstein were committing petty crimes for the brothers. On one such occasion, Reles was caught and sentenced to two years in an upstate New York juvenile institution. The Shapiro brothers failed to help Reles, prompting Reles to plan revenge.

After his release, Reles, Goldstein, and George Defeo entered the slot machine business, the province of the Shapiro brothers. Through Defeo's connections, Reles and Goldstein were able to make a deal with the influential crime lord Meyer Lansky, who wanted access to the poorer neighborhoods of Brooklyn and thus agreed. Both parties prospered: Lansky was able to get sizable footholds in Brownsville, East New York, and Ocean Hill, while Reles gained the backing he needed to keep both his business and himself alive.

Reles, Goldstein, and Strauss were partners in all of their criminal activities, which had primarily been the slot machine business and quickly expanded to include loan sharking, crap games, and labor slugging in connection with union activities, especially the restaurant union.

In 1934, Reles and Harry Strauss were charged with first degree murder and second degree assault for attacking two black garage men. After one man, Charles Battles, berated Reles for causing a disturbance, he and Strauss had attacked him. Later that morning, the two allegedly returned and stabbed another man, Alvin Snyder, to death. The police said that Snyder was mistaken for Battles. The murder charge against Strauss was dropped due to insufficient evidence, albeit Reles was convicted of a lesser charge of second degree murder for stabbing Battles. The judge criticized the jury for the verdict, describing Reles as an extremely dangerous man who was "more vicious than Dillinger, but lacks the courage." Reles was sentenced to three years in prison for assault, but acquitted of the murder.

The slot machine business thrived and soon Reles and Goldstein were on the Shapiros' hit list. One night, the two men received a phone call from a "friend" saying that the Shapiros had left their East New York headquarters. Hopping into a car with Defeo, they headed to East New York. However, when they reached the Shapiros' building, the three men were ambushed. Reles and Goldstein were wounded, but all three managed to escape. In the meantime, Meyer Shapiro abducted Reles' girlfriend and dragged her to an open field, where he beat and raped her.

== Revenge against Shapiro Brothers ==
To avenge the ambush and his girlfriend's rape, Reles enlisted the help of fellow Murder, Inc. killers Frank "Dasher" Abbandando and Harry "Happy" Maione. The two killers were glad to help: they hoped to kill the Shapiro brothers and take over some of their operations. After several futile attempts by each side to eradicate the other, the Murder, Inc. group finally caught up with Irving Shapiro.

On that occasion, Reles dragged Irving from the hallway of his home out into the street. Reles beat, kicked, and then shot Irving numerous times, killing him. Two months later, Reles met Meyer Shapiro on the street and killed him by shooting him in the face. Another three years elapsed before Reles finally got the last Shapiro brother, William. William was abducted off the street and taken to a gang hideout. Once there, he was beaten nearly to death, stuffed into a sack, and driven out to the Canarsie section of Brooklyn and buried. Before the gang could finish burying William, a passerby spotted them and they had to flee the scene. William Shapiro's body was exhumed shortly thereafter, and after being autopsied it was determined that he had been buried alive.

== Government informant ==
In 1940, Reles was implicated in a number of killings. Realizing that he faced execution if convicted, Reles became a government witness. Reles implicated his boss Lepke Buchalter in the murder of Brooklyn candy store owner Joseph Rosen; Buchalter was eventually convicted and executed for this crime. Reles's information also implicated Louis Capone, Mendy Weiss, Harry Maione, Harry Strauss, Frank Abbandando, Irving ("Knadles" and "the Plug") Nitzberg, and even his own childhood friend "Buggsy" Goldstein. All except Nitzberg were eventually convicted and executed. Reles' next target was Albert Anastasia, who had been co-chief of operations of Murder, Inc.

Reles was to implicate Anastasia in the murder of union longshoreman Pete Panto. However, unlike other members of Murder, Inc., Anastasia was a high-ranking member of the Cosa Nostra. The trial, based solely on Reles' testimony, was set for November 12, 1941. Until then, Reles was under constant guard by police detectives at the Half Moon Hotel in Coney Island.

== Death ==
In the early morning of November 12, 1941, with police guarding the door, Reles fell to his death from a window in room 623 at the Half Moon Hotel.

It appeared he may have been trying to lower himself to the fifth floor window underneath using two bedsheets tied together and then to a four-foot length of wire that had been attached to a valve in his room. However, the wire knot to the valve came undone, and he fell to a second floor outdoor landing, and newspapers dubbed him "The Canary Who Could Sing, But Couldn't Fly".

The following day, five police officers who had been guarding him were demoted.

There was widespread speculation that he had been thrown or pushed out of the window and the room had been arranged to look like he was trying to escape. Reles had shown no inclination to escape from protective custody and indeed had demonstrated a fear of even being out of earshot of the police. However, in 1951 a grand jury concluded Reles died accidentally during an attempted escape.

Frank Costello reportedly raised $100,000 to bribe these guards to kill Reles. In 2005 evidence was reported that NYPD Detective Charles Burns, one of Reles's police bodyguards, was involved in the disappearance and probable murder of NYC anti-corruption judge Joseph Force Crater in 1930.

Reles is buried in Old Mount Carmel Cemetery in Glendale, Queens.

== In popular culture ==
In the 1960 film Murder, Inc., Reles was portrayed by Peter Falk in his Oscar-nominated breakout role. That same year, Falk played Reles again in "Kid Twist", an episode of the CBS series Witness.

== See also ==
- List of unsolved murders
