= Harry Strauss =

American contract killer (1909–1941)

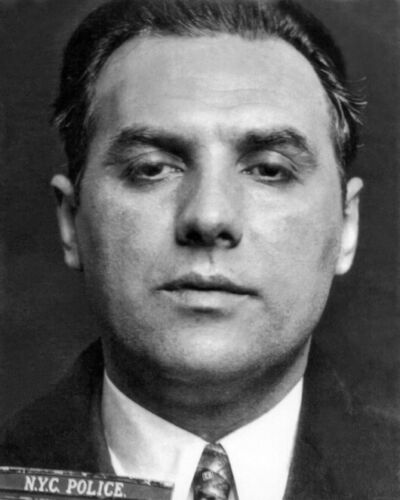
- Born: Harry Ostrovsky; July 28, 1909; Russian Empire
- Died: June 12, 1941 (aged 31); Sing Sing Prison, New York, U.S.
- Resting place: Beth David Cemetery
- Other name: Pittsburgh Phil
- Occupation: Hitman
- Status: Executed by electrocution
- Allegiance: Murder, Inc.
- Conviction: First degree murder
- Penalty: Death

Harry "Pittsburgh Phil" Strauss (born Harry Ostrovsky; July 28, 1909 – June 12, 1941) was an American contract killer for Murder, Inc. in the 1930s. He reportedly killed over one hundred men (some historians put the number as high as 500) using a variety of methods, including shooting, stabbing with ice picks, drowning, live burial, and strangulation. Strauss never carried a weapon in case the local police picked him up on suspicion. He would scout his murder spot for any tool that would do the job.

Most of his associates called him "Pep". In the 1930s, he was committing assaults, larcenies, and drug dealing. He was arrested 18 times but was never convicted, until he was found guilty of the homicide that sent him and fellow Murder, Inc. hitman Martin "Buggsy" Goldstein to the electric chair. After hitman Abe "Kid Twist" Reles turned informant, Strauss was arrested for the murder of Irving "Puggy" Feinstein, and at least five other known murders. Strauss tried to avoid conviction by feigning insanity in the courtroom and on death row. Strauss and Goldstein were convicted on September 19, 1940, and executed by electrocution using Sing Sing's Old Sparky on June 12, 1941.

== Early life ==
He was born in July 1909 to a Jewish family in the Russian Empire. His parents were Jacob and Yetta Ostrovsky. The family immigrated to the U.S. in 1914 and changed their surname to Strauss. Like many other Jewish immigrants, the Strauss family settled on the Lower East Side, Manhattan, New York City. Harry had one sister, Fannie, and three brothers, Hyman, Alex, and Sam.

His father, Jacob Strauss, worked for the city's Department of Street Cleaning. The family later moved to the Bronx. In 1917 or 1918, his father was killed in an industrial accident. His widowed mother later remarried. He dropped out of school at age 15. In his youth Strauss started committing crimes and became more involved in the streets as the years passed.

In 1934, Harry Strauss and Abe Reles were charged with first degree murder and second degree assault for attacking two Black garage attendants. After one man, Charles Battles, berated Reles for causing a disturbance, he and Harry Strauss attacked him. Later that morning, the two allegedly returned and stabbed another man, Alvin Snyder, to death. The police said that Snyder was mistaken for Battles. The murder charge against Strauss was dropped due to insufficient evidence. Reles was convicted of a lesser charge of second degree assault for stabbing Battle, and sentenced to three years in prison.

== See also ==
- Capital punishment in New York
- List of people executed in New York
- List of people executed in the United States in 1941
