= Albert Anastasia =

Italian-American mob boss (1902–1957)

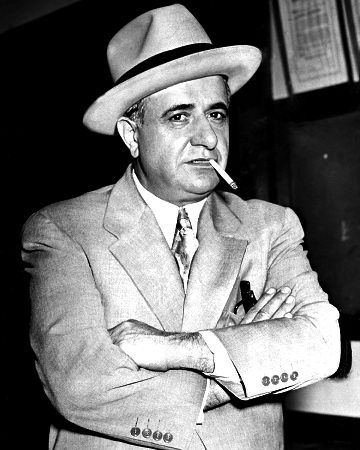
- Anastasia in the 1950s
- Born: Umberto Anastasio; September 26, 1902; Tropea, Calabria, Italy
- Died: October 25, 1957 (aged 55); New York City, New York, U.S.
- Cause of death: Gunshot wound
- Resting place: Green-Wood Cemetery, New York City, New York, U.S.
- Other names: The One-Man Army; Mad Hatter; Lord High Executioner; Don Umberto
- Citizenship: American
- Occupation: Crime boss
- Predecessor: Vincent Mangano
- Successor: Carlo Gambino
- Spouse: Elsa Bargnesi (m. 1937)
- Children: 4
- Relatives: Anthony Anastasio (brother); Anthony Scotto (nephew-in-law)
- Status: Deceased
- Allegiance: Anastasia crime family Murder, Inc.
- Convictions: Murder (1921); Illegal possession of a firearm (1923); Tax evasion (1955)
- Criminal charge: First degree murder (1928, later dropped)
- Penalty: Death (1921, but released in 1922 during retrial) 2 years' imprisonment (1923); 1 year imprisonment (1955)
- Military career
- Allegiance: U.S.
- Branch: U.S. Army
- Service years: 1942–1944

Umberto "Albert" Anastasia (/ˌænəˈsteɪʒə/, Italian: [umˈbɛrto anastaˈziːa]; né Anastasio [anaˈstaːzjo]; September 26, 1902 – October 25, 1957) was an Italian-American mobster who was one of the founders of the modern American Mafia, and a co-founder and later boss of the Murder, Inc. organization, and would eventually rise to the position of boss in what became the modern Gambino crime family. He also controlled New York City's waterfront for most of his criminal career, mainly through dockworker unions. Anastasia was murdered on October 25, 1957, on the orders of Vito Genovese and Carlo Gambino; Gambino subsequently became the boss of the family.

Anastasia was one of the most ruthless and feared organized crime figures in American history; his reputation earned him the nicknames The Earthquake, The One-Man Army, The Mad Hatter and The Lord High Executioner.

== Early life ==
Albert Anastasia was born Umberto Anastasio on September 26, 1902, in Parghelia, Calabria, Italy, to Bartolomeo Anastasio and Marianna Polistena. Anastasia's father was a railway worker who died after World War I, leaving behind nine children. Anastasia had seven brothers: Raffaele; Frank; Anthony; Joseph; Gerardo; Luigi (who later moved to Australia), Salvatore Anastasio; and a sister, Maria.

In 1919, Anastasia, with his brothers Joseph, Anthony and Gerardo, illegally entered the United States after they deserted a freighter they were working aboard in New York City. They soon started working as longshoremen on the Brooklyn waterfront.

On March 17, 1921, Anastasia was convicted of murdering longshoreman George Turino as the result of a quarrel. He was sentenced to death and sent to Sing Sing State Prison in Ossining, New York, to await execution. Due to a legal technicality, however, Anastasia won a retrial in 1922, four of the original prosecution witnesses had since disappeared, and Anastasia was released from custody. During that time, he legally changed his surname from "Anastasio" to "Anastasia." On June 6, 1923, Anastasia was convicted of illegal possession of a firearm and sentenced to two years in prison. In 1928, he was charged with a murder in Brooklyn, but the witnesses either disappeared or refused to testify in court.

In 1937, Anastasia married Elsa Bargnesi and they had two sons, Umberto and Richard; and two daughters, Joyana and Gloriana.

== Rise to power ==
By the late 1920s, Anastasia had become a top leader of the International Longshoremen's Association (ILA), controlling six local chapters of the labor union in Brooklyn. He allied himself with Giuseppe "Joe the Boss" Masseria, a powerful Sicilian-born crime boss in Brooklyn. He soon became close associates with future Cosa Nostra bosses Joe Adonis, Charles "Lucky" Luciano, Vito Genovese and Frank Costello.

In May 1929 he attended the historic Atlantic City Conference, believed to be the first ever national summit of the American mafia.

== Castellammarese War ==
In early 1931, the Castellammarese War broke out between Masseria and Salvatore Maranzano. In a secret deal with Maranzano, Luciano agreed to engineer the death of his boss, Masseria, in exchange for receiving Masseria's rackets and becoming Maranzano's second-in-command. On April 15, Luciano lured Masseria to a meeting at the Nuova Villa Tammaro restaurant on Coney Island, where he was murdered. While the two men played cards, Luciano allegedly excused himself to the bathroom. Anastasia and other gunmen—reportedly Adonis, Genovese and Benjamin "Bugsy" Siegel—then shot Masseria to death. Ciro "The Artichoke King" Terranova drove the getaway car; legend has it that he was too shaken up to drive away and Siegel had to shove him out of the driver's seat. Luciano took over Masseria's family, with Genovese as his underboss.

In 1932, Anastasia was indicted on charges of murdering another man with an ice pick, but the case was dropped due to lack of witnesses. The following year, he was charged with killing a man who worked in a laundry; again, there were no witnesses willing to testify.

== Murder, Inc. ==
To reward Anastasia's loyalty, Luciano placed him and Louis "Lepke" Buchalter, the leading labor racketeer in the country, in control of the National Crime Syndicate's enforcement arm, Murder, Inc. The troop, also known as "The Brownsville Boys", was a group of Jewish and Italian contract killers that operated out of the back room of Midnight Rose's, a candy store owned by mobster Louis Capone in the Brownsville neighborhood of Brooklyn. During its ten years of operation, it is estimated that Murder Inc. committed thousands of murders, many of which were never solved. For his leadership in Murder, Inc., Anastasia was nicknamed the "Mad Hatter" and the "Lord High Executioner".

In 1935 the Commission, the governing body established by Luciano following Maranzano's murder in 1931, ordered Dutch Schultz to drop his plans to murder Special Prosecutor Thomas E. Dewey out of fear for the law enforcement crackdown that would inevitably follow. An enraged Schultz refused and walked out of the meeting. Anastasia approached Luciano with information that Schultz had asked him to stake out Dewey's apartment building on Fifth Avenue. Upon hearing the news, the Commission held a discreet meeting to discuss the matter. After six hours of deliberations the Commission ordered Buchalter to eliminate Schultz. On October 23, 1935, before he could kill Dewey, Schultz was shot in a tavern in Newark, New Jersey, and succumbed to his injuries the following day.

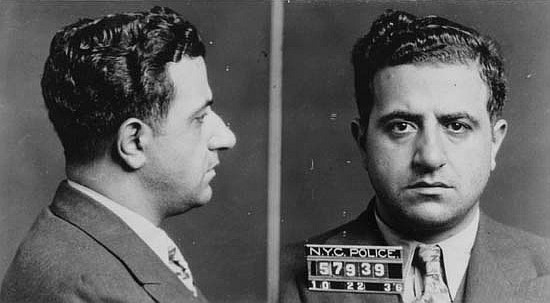
Mugshot of Anastasia in 1936

On June 7, 1936, following a prosecution by Dewey's office masterminded by Eunice Carter, Luciano was convicted on 62 counts of forced prostitution. On July 18, he received a 30 to 50-year sentence in state prison. Genovese became acting boss, but he fled to Italy in 1937 after being indicted on a 1934 murder. Costello then became acting boss of the Luciano crime family.

In May 1939, Anastasia allegedly ordered the murder of Morris Diamond, a Teamsters Union official in Brooklyn who had opposed Buchalter's attempts to maintain control of the Garment District in Manhattan. In the summer of 1939, he allegedly organized the murder of Peter Panto, an International Longshoremen's Association activist who had been leading a movement for democratic reforms in the union's local chapters, and refused to be intimidated by ILA officials. On July 14, 1939, Panto disappeared; his body was later recovered on a farm in New Jersey.

In 1941, Abe Reles, a gang leader from Brownsville, Brooklyn, who had been supplying Anastasia and Murder Inc. with hitmen for the previous decade, was arrested by law enforcement, effectively ending Murder Inc. Reles decided to testify for the government to save himself from the death penalty, leading to the conviction of seven members of Murder Inc. Reles also had information that could implicate Anastasia in the Diamond and Panto murders. Fearful of prosecution, Anastasia offered a $100,000 reward for Reles's murder. On November 12, 1941, Reles was found dead on a restaurant roof outside the Half Moon Hotel on Coney Island. Reles was being guarded in a sixth-floor room during an ongoing trial. In 1951, a grand jury ruled that Reles accidentally died while climbing down to the fifth floor using sheets tied to a heating radiator. However, many officials still suspected that Reles had been murdered.

In the spring of 1942, Anastasia allegedly ordered the murder of an associate, Anthony Romeo, who had been arrested and questioned in the Panto killing. At the end of June, Romeo's body was discovered near Guyencourt, Delaware; he had been beaten and shot a number of times.

== World War II ==
During World War II, Anastasia reportedly conceived the plan to win a pardon for the imprisoned Luciano by contributing to the war effort. With the United States needing allies in Sicily to advance the invasion of Italy and the desire of the U.S. Navy to dedicate its resources to the war, Anastasia orchestrated a deal to obtain lighter treatment and eventual parole for Luciano in exchange for the Mafia's protection of the waterfront and Luciano's assistance with his associates in Sicily.

In 1942, Anastasia joined the U.S. Army, possibly motivated by a desire to escape the criminal investigations that were dismantling Murder Inc. Attaining the rank of technical sergeant, he trained soldiers to be longshoremen at Fort Indiantown Gap in Pennsylvania. In 1943, as a reward for his military service, he received U.S. citizenship. The following year, Anastasia was honorably discharged and moved his family to a ranch house on Bluff Road in Fort Lee, New Jersey.

In 1945, U.S. military authorities in Sicily returned Genovese to the U.S. to be tried for the murder of Ferdinand Boccia in 1934. However, after the death of the main prosecution witness, all charges against Genovese were dropped. In 1946, New York Governor Thomas E. Dewey commuted Luciano's sentence, and the federal government immediately deported him to Italy.

In 1946 he attended the Havana Conference in Cuba. In 1948, Anastasia bought a dressmaking factory in Hazleton, Pennsylvania, and left his waterfront activities in the control of his brother Anthony.

== Boss ==
In 1951, the U.S. Senate summoned Anastasia to answer questions about organized crime at the Kefauver Hearings. Anastasia refused to answer any questions.

Despite being a mob power in his own right, Anastasia was nominally the underboss of the Mangano crime family, under boss Vincent Mangano. During his 20-year rule, Mangano had resented Anastasia's close ties to Luciano and Costello, particularly the fact that they had obtained Anastasia's services without first seeking Mangano's permission. This and other business disputes led to heated, almost physical fights between the two mobsters. On April 19, 1951, Mangano went missing and his body was never found. The same day, the body of Mangano's brother Philip was discovered in Jamaica Bay. No one was ever arrested in the Mangano murders, but it was widely assumed that Anastasia had them killed.

After the deaths of the Manganos, Anastasia, who had been serving as acting boss of their family, met with the Commission, claiming that the brothers wanted to kill him, but did not admit to killing them. With Costello's prodding, the Commission confirmed Anastasia's ascension as boss of the renamed Anastasia family; Costello wanted Anastasia as an ally against the ambitious and resentful Genovese. Anastasia also was supported by Joseph Bonanno, who simply wanted to avoid a gang war.

In March 1952, Anastasia allegedly ordered the murder of Arnold Schuster, a New York man who successfully identified fugitive bank robber Willie Sutton, resulting in Sutton's arrest. When Anastasia saw Schuster being interviewed on television, he allegedly said: "I can't stand squealers! Hit that guy!" On March 8, 1952, a gunman shot Schuster to death on a street in Borough Park, Brooklyn. In 1963, government witness Joseph Valachi accused Anastasia of ordering the murder, but many people in law enforcement were skeptical. No one was ever arrested in the Schuster murder.

On December 9, 1952, the federal government filed suit to denaturalize Anastasia and deport him because he lied on his citizenship application.

== Conviction ==
To take control of the Luciano family, Genovese needed to kill Costello. Unable to do so without also eliminating Anastasia, Genovese looked for allies. He used Anastasia's brutal behavior against him in an effort to win supporters, portraying Anastasia as an unstable killer who threatened to bring law enforcement pressure on the Cosa Nostra. In addition, Genovese pointed out that Anastasia had been selling memberships to his crime family for $50,000, a clear violation of Commission rules that infuriated many high-level mobsters. According to Valachi, Anastasia had been losing large amounts of money betting on horse races, making him even more surly and unpredictable.

Over the next few years, Genovese secretly won the support of Anastasia caporegime Carlo Gambino, offering him the leadership of Anastasia's family in return for his cooperation.

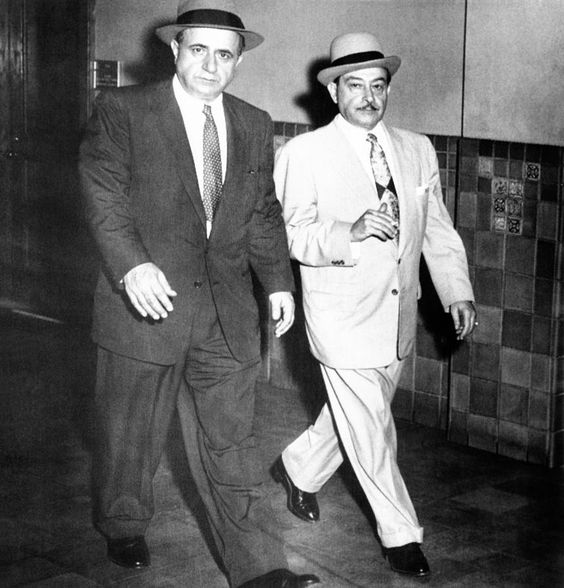
Albert Anastasia (left) leaves Federal District Court with his attorney, Anthony Colendra. May 23, 1955.

On May 23, 1955, Anastasia pleaded guilty to tax evasion for underreporting his income during the late 1940s. On June 3, 1955, Anastasia was sentenced to one year in federal prison and a $20,000 fine. After his conviction, the federal government successfully petitioned to revoke Anastasia's citizenship so he could be deported. However, on September 19, 1955, a higher court overturned the revocation.

In early 1957, Genovese decided to move on Costello. On May 2, 1957, gunman Vincent Gigante shot and wounded Costello outside his apartment building. Although the wound was superficial, it persuaded Costello to relinquish power to Genovese and retire. Genovese then controlled what became known as the Genovese crime family. Bonanno later credited himself with arranging a sitdown, where he kept Anastasia from immediately taking Genovese to war in response.

On June 17 of that year, Frank Scalice, Anastasia's underboss and the man identified as directly responsible for selling family memberships, was murdered. According to Valachi, Anastasia approved the hit, and the subsequent murder of Scalice's brother Joseph, after offering to forgive his threats to avenge Frank.

== Murder ==
On the morning of October 25, 1957, Anastasia entered the barber shop of the Park Sheraton Hotel, at 56th Street and 7th Avenue in Midtown Manhattan. Anastasia's driver parked the car in an underground garage and then took a walk outside, leaving him unprotected. As Anastasia relaxed in the barber's chair, two men with scarves covering their faces rushed in, shoved the barber out of the way, and fired at Anastasia. After the first volley of bullets, Anastasia reportedly got up from his chair but fell into the mirror as the gunmen fired. The gunmen continued firing until Anastasia finally fell dead on the floor.

The Anastasia homicide generated a tremendous amount of public interest and sparked a high-profile police investigation. According to The New York Times journalist and Five Families author Selwyn Raab, "The vivid image of a helpless victim swathed in white towels was stamped in the public memory". However, no one was charged in the case. Speculation on who killed Anastasia has centered on Profaci crime family mobster Joe Gallo, the Patriarca crime family of Providence, Rhode Island, and certain drug dealers within the Gambino family. Initially, the NYPD concluded that Anastasia's homicide had been arranged by Genovese and Gambino and that it was carried out by a crew led by Gallo. At one point, Gallo boasted to an associate of his part in the hit, "You can just call the five of us the barbershop quintet". It was rumored that one of the reasons Anastasia was killed was because he had tried to move into Cuba, where Santo Trafficante Jr. had already established himself.

Anastasia's funeral service was conducted at a Brooklyn funeral home; the Diocese of Brooklyn had refused to sanction a church burial. Anastasia was interred in Green-Wood Cemetery in Greenwood Heights, Brooklyn, attended by a handful of friends and relatives. The grave is marked "Anastasio". In 1958, his family emigrated to Canada, and changed the name to "Anisio".

=== Aftermath ===
Gambino was expected to be proclaimed boss of Anastasia's family at the November 14, 1957, Apalachin Meeting, called by Genovese to discuss the future of Cosa Nostra in light of his takeover. When the meeting was raided by police, to the detriment of Genovese's reputation, Gambino's appointment was postponed to a later meeting in New York City. Under Gambino, Anthony Anastasio saw his power curtailed, and in frustration, he began passing information to the FBI shortly before his 1963 death.

Genovese enjoyed a short reign as family boss. In 1957, after the disastrous Apalachin Meeting, Luciano, Costello, and Gambino conspired to entrap Genovese with a narcotics conviction, bribing a drug dealer to testify he had personally worked with Genovese. On July 7, 1958, Genovese was indicted on narcotics trafficking charges. On April 17, 1959, he was sentenced to 15 years in state prison.

Anastasia lived in a 25-room, 6,529-square-foot, hilltop mansion located in Fort Lee, New Jersey, from 1947 until his murder. In 1958, less than a year after his death, comedian Buddy Hackett and his wife purchased the mansion, and after renovations, lived there through most of the 1960s. The mansion sold for $6.9 million in late December 2017. The house was last sold in December 2018, for $3.6 million, and demolished in March 2019.

Actor and former heavyweight boxing contender Jack O'Halloran claims to be Anastasia's illegitimate son.

== In popular culture ==
After the Anastasia murder, the barber chairs at the Park Sheraton Hotel were repositioned to face away from the mirror. The Anastasia chair was later auctioned off for $7,000. In February 2012, the chair became an exhibit at the Mob Museum in Las Vegas.

=== Movies ===
- The fictional character Johnny Friendly (played by Lee J. Cobb) in the classic 1954 American film On the Waterfront was partially based on Anastasia.
- The 1959 film Inside the Mafia opens with the scene of Anastasia's murder.
- Anastasia's murder, as well as the 1957 Apalachin Meeting, were referenced in the 1999 film Analyze This, starring Robert De Niro and Billy Crystal.
- Anastasia is portrayed by Fausto Tozzi in the 1972 film The Valachi Papers.
- He is portrayed by Richard Conte in Italian movie of 1973 with Alberto Sordi: My Brother Anastasia.
- He is portrayed by Gianni Russo in the 1975 film Lepke, starring Tony Curtis.
- He is portrayed by Garry Pastore in the 2019 movies The Irishman and Mob Town.
- He is portrayed by Michael Rispoli in the 2025 film The Alto Knights.

=== Television ===
- The TV series M*A*S*H makes a reference to Anastasia's death, anachronistically, as the Korean War had already been over for four years when Anastasia was killed.
  - Season 4, Episode 12 "Soldier of the Month", Hawkeye Pierce sarcastically refers to a sleeping soldier as "Albert Anastasia's doorman".
- In the TV series The West Wing Season 4, Episode 11 "Holy Night", White House Communications Director Toby Ziegler and his father Jules discuss the Anastasia murder.
- In an episode of The Sopranos, mob boss Junior Soprano and his nephew Tony Soprano discuss the Mafia in Anastasia's time.
- He is portrayed by Gus Zucco in the AMC series The Making of the Mob: New York, a docudrama focusing on the history of the mob.
- The brutal title character of the Netflix series Dirty John claims to be a descendant of Anastasia.

=== Literature ===
- In The Day of The Jackal, a 1973 fictional novel by Frederick Forsyth, a detective considers "Marco Vitellino", a bodyguard who was absent during Anastasia's murder as one of several suspects who could be contracted to kill French President Charles de Gaulle.
- A fictional payback hit for Anastasia's murder is described in "Before the Play", the prologue of The Shining.
- Anastasia's murder in the Harold Robbins book The Raiders (1995) is carried out by a contract killer known only by the pseudonym Malditesta (Italian for headache).
- Mayra Montero's novel Son de Almendra (English title: Dancing to "Almendra") is based on Anastasia's murder.

=== Videogames ===
- In Mafia II, Don Alberto Clemente is partially based on Anastasia, particularly his known violations of Mafia code by trying to "sell" made men. Clemente's death was based on a combination of Anastasia's assassination and the attempted murder of Adolf Hitler at the Wolf's Den.

=== Music ===
- Rapper Rick Ross entitled his 2010 mixtape The Albert Anastasia EP.

== See also ==
- List of unsolved murders (1900–1979)

American Mafia
Preceded by Steve Ferrigno	Gambino crime family Underboss; 1931–1951	Succeeded by Frank Scalice
Preceded by Vincent Mangano	Gambino crime family Boss; 1951–1957	Succeeded by Carlo Gambino
