= National Crime Syndicate =

Term describing informal cooperation among U.S. organized crime figures

- Founded: Late 1920s–1930s (as a term in media and law enforcement)
- Founded by: Lucky Luciano, Meyer Lansky, Johnny Torrio
- Founding location: United States
- Years active: Prohibition era–mid-20th century (as a descriptive concept)
- Territory: United States
- Ethnicity: Italian-American, Jewish-American
- Membership (est.): Varying independent regional syndicates and street gangs
- Criminal activities: Bootlegging, gambling, labor racketeering, extortion, bribery, fraud
- Allies: The Commission, Murder, Inc., various independent multi-ethnic bootlegging operations
- Rivals: Maranzano crime family and old-guard "Mustache Pete" traditionalists (prior to 1931)

The National Crime Syndicate is a term used by journalists, law-enforcement officials, and some historians to describe informal cooperation among organized crime figures in the United States during the Prohibition era and the mid-20th century. Rather than a single, centralized organization, the term generally refers to loose, pragmatic alliances among Italian-American and Jewish-American criminal organizations and other criminal groups engaged in bootlegging, gambling, and related illicit activities.

While mid-20th-century media accounts and congressional investigations—most notably those conducted by the Kefauver Committee—often portrayed the Syndicate as a national confederation with leadership and enforcement mechanisms, later scholarship has questioned whether such an organization ever existed in a formal sense. Many historians argue that the concept reflects contemporaneous efforts to explain inter-ethnic criminal cooperation rather than evidence of a durable, structured criminal body.

== History ==
The concept of a National Crime Syndicate emerged during the late 1920s and 1930s, as organized crime groups across the United States expanded beyond local and ethnic boundaries, particularly during Prohibition. Journalists and law-enforcement officials used the term to describe increased coordination among criminal figures involved in bootlegging, gambling, labor racketeering, and other illicit enterprises.

Popular accounts often trace the origins of the Syndicate to a reported meeting of underworld figures in Atlantic City in 1929. While several writers have described this gathering as a founding conference, historians note that contemporary evidence is limited and that, if such a meeting occurred, it likely functioned as a coordination or networking event among bootleggers rather than the establishment of a formal organization.

During the 1930s and 1940s, newspapers and prosecutors used the term Murder, Inc. to describe a series of killings carried out by loosely connected criminal figures, many of them based in Brooklyn’s Brownsville neighborhood. Contemporary media accounts portrayed these murders as the work of a centralized, nationwide enforcement arm serving organized crime leadership. Subsequent historical research, however, has challenged this interpretation, concluding that “Murder, Inc.” was a journalistic and prosecutorial label rather than a formal organization. Scholars argue that the violence attributed to Murder, Inc. reflected episodic, situational killings tied to local rackets and personal alliances—particularly those involving figures such as Louis Buchalter and Albert Anastasia—rather than the activities of a standing corps of salaried contract killers.

In his biography of Meyer Lansky, journalist Robert Lacey argued that no National Crime Syndicate existed as a cohesive entity, describing the term as a journalistic and prosecutorial construct that overstated the degree of coordination among criminal groups. According to this interpretation, cooperation among mob figures was episodic and transactional, lacking the permanence, hierarchy, or governance implied by the Syndicate label.

== See also ==
- American Mafia
  - The Commission (American Mafia)
- Jewish-American organized crime
