= Lepke Buchalter =

American mob boss (1897–1944)

Louis Buchalter
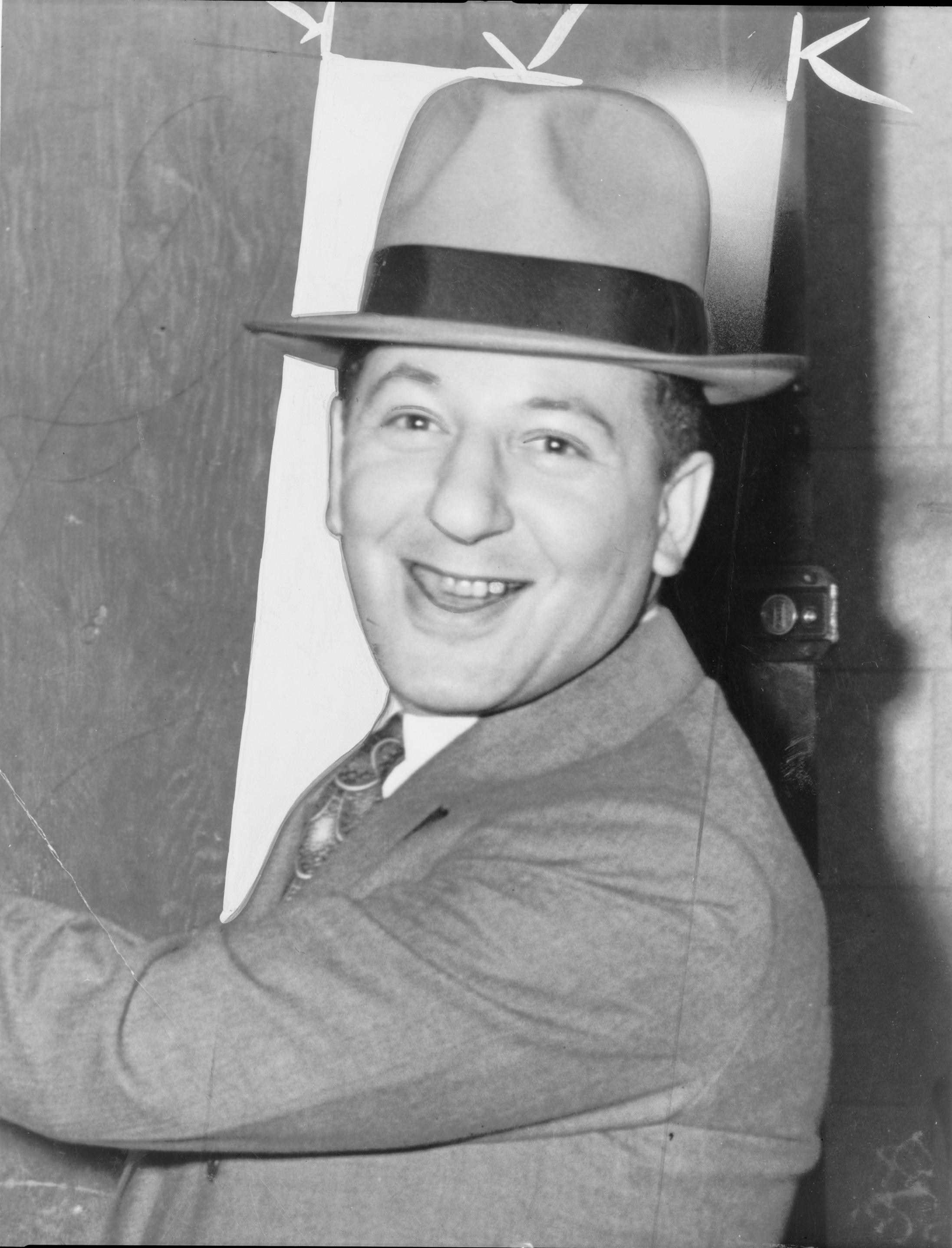
- Buchalter in 1939
- Born: February 6, 1897; New York City, U.S.
- Died: March 4, 1944 (aged 47); Sing Sing Prison, New York, U.S.
- Other name: Lepke
- Occupations: Gangster; hitman; smuggler; racketeer; bootlegger; extortionist
- Known for: Member of Jewish-American organized crime
- Spouse: Betty Buchalter (m. 1931)
- Children: 1 (adopted)
- Status: Executed by electrocution
- Conviction: First degree murder
- Penalty: Death

Louis Buchalter, known as Louis Lepke, Lepke Buchalter or Judge Louie, (February 6, 1897 – March 4, 1944), was a Jewish-American organized crime figure and head of the Mafia hit squad Murder, Inc., during the 1930s. Buchalter was one of the premier labor union racketeers in New York City during that era.

Charles Birger, Dominic Benigno, and Buchalter are the only National Crime Syndicate bosses to be executed after being convicted of murder. Buchalter was executed using the infamous "Old Sparky" electric chair after being sent "up the river" to Sing Sing Correctional Facility.

== Background ==
Buchalter was born on February 6, 1897, into a large Ashkenazi Jewish family on the Lower East Side of Manhattan. His parents emigrated separately from the Russian Empire and married in 1893 in New York, where they had three sons together. His mother called Louis, their second son, "Lepkeleh" ("little Louis" in Yiddish), which later became "Lepke".

His father, Barnett (Berl) Buchalter, had been a widower from Pruzhany (now Belarus) who immigrated to the United States in 1890 with three daughters. He was a machinist who operated a hardware store on the Lower East Side. His mother, Rose (Reisel) Kauvar Buchalter (née Devaltov or De Waltoff), was from Vilnius and had three sons and two daughters by her first husband. His half-brother was Rabbi Charles Kauvar, while his brother Emanuel became a dentist and brother Isadore a pharmacist.

In 1909, when Buchalter was 12, his father died. In 1910, Buchalter finished elementary school and started a job selling theatrical goods. Reportedly, on the Lower East Side, he attended the Rabbi Jacob Joseph School, where he was an "honor roll" student. Soon after, his mother moved to Arizona for health reasons, leaving Buchalter in the care of his sister, Sarah. However, Buchalter was beyond her control.

On September 2, 1915, Buchalter was arrested in New York for the first time for burglary and assault, but the case was dismissed. In late 1915 or early 1916, Buchalter went to live with his uncle in Bridgeport, Connecticut. On February 29, 1916, Buchalter was arrested in Bridgeport on burglary charges and was sent to the Cheshire Reformatory for juvenile offenders in Cheshire, Connecticut, until July 12, 1917. After a dispute with his uncle over wages, Buchalter moved back to New York City.

On September 28, 1917, Buchalter was sentenced in New York to 18 months in state prison at Sing Sing in Ossining, New York, on a grand larceny conviction. After a transfer to Auburn Prison in Auburn, New York, Buchalter was released on January 27, 1919. On January 22, 1920, Buchalter returned to Sing Sing on a 30-month sentence for attempted burglary. He was released on March 16, 1922.

== Rise to power ==
Upon Buchalter's 1922 release from prison, he started working with his childhood friend, mobster Jacob "Gurrah" Shapiro. Through force and fear, they began gaining control of the garment industry unions. Buchalter then used the unions to threaten strikes and demand weekly payments from factory owners while dipping into union bank accounts. Buchalter's control of the unions evolved into a protection racket, extending into areas such as bakery trucking. The unions were profitable for him and he kept a hold over them even after becoming an important figure in organized crime. Buchalter later formed an alliance with Tommy Lucchese, a leader of the Lucchese crime family, and together they controlled the garment district.

Buchalter and Shapiro moved into new and fashionable luxury buildings on Eastern Parkway with family who were active synagogue goers (Union Temple and Kol Israel Synagogue of Brooklyn). In later years, Buchalter and his family lived in a penthouse in the exclusive Central Park West section of Manhattan.

In 1927, Buchalter and Shapiro were arrested for the murder of Jacob Orgen (Little Augie) and the attempted murder of Irish-American bootlegger Jack Diamond, a criminal rival. However, the charges were later dropped due to a lack of evidence.

Buchalter was described as a quiet man who for years managed to avoid the public spotlight. In conversations with his criminal associates, Buchalter preferred listening over talking. Buchalter generously compensated his gang members and took them to hockey games, boxing matches, and even winter cruises.

In May 1929 he attended the historic Atlantic City Conference, believed to be the first ever national summit of the American mafia. On August 20, 1931, Buchalter married Betty Wasserman, a British-born widow of Russian descent, at New York City Hall. Buchalter adopted Betty's child from her previous marriage.

== Murder, Inc. ==
In the early 1930s, Buchalter created an effective process for performing contract killings for Cosa Nostra mobsters; it had no name, but the press ten years later called it Murder, Inc. The Cosa Nostra mobsters wanted to insulate themselves from any connection to these murders. Buchalter's partner, mobster Albert Anastasia, would relay a contract request from the Cosa Nostra to Buchalter. In turn, Buchalter would assign the job to Jewish and Italian street gang members from Brooklyn.

None of these contract killers had any connections with the major crime families. If they were caught, they could not implicate their Cosa Nostra employers in the crimes. Buchalter used the same killers for his own murder contracts. The Murder, Inc., killers were soon completing jobs all over the country for their mobster bosses.

In 1935, Buchalter arranged his most significant murder: the powerful New York gangster Dutch Schultz. Schultz had proposed to the National Crime Syndicate, a confederation of mobsters, that New York District Attorney Thomas Dewey be murdered. Co-founder of the Syndicate and leading mafioso Charles "Lucky" Luciano argued that a Dewey assassination would precipitate a massive law enforcement crackdown. An enraged Schultz said he would kill Dewey anyway and walked out of the meeting. After six hours of deliberations the Commission ordered Buchalter to eliminate Schultz. On October 23, 1935, Schultz was shot in a Newark, New Jersey tavern, and succumbed to his injuries the following day. In 1941, one of Buchalter's stable of killers, Charles "The Bug" Workman, was charged in the Schultz murder.

In 1935, law enforcement estimated that Buchalter and Shapiro had 250 men working for them, and that Buchalter was grossing over $1 million ($23,000,000 in current dollar terms) per year. They controlled rackets in the trucking, baking, and garment industries throughout New York. Buchalter also owned the Riobamba, a posh nightclub in Manhattan.

== Downfall ==
On September 13, 1936, Murder, Inc. killers, acting on Buchalter's orders, gunned down Joseph Rosen, a Brooklyn candy store owner. Rosen was a former garment industry trucker whose union Buchalter took over. Rosen had angered Buchalter by refusing to leave town as Buchalter demanded when, despite the absence of proof, Buchalter believed Rosen was cooperating with District Attorney Thomas Dewey. At the time, no one was indicted in the Rosen murder.

On November 8, 1936, Buchalter and Shapiro were convicted of violating federal anti-trust laws in the rabbit fur industry in New York. While out on bail, both Buchalter and Shapiro disappeared. On November 13, both men were sentenced in absentia to two years in federal prison. The two men later appealed the verdict, but in June 1937 both convictions were upheld.

== Manhunt ==
Before they could be taken into custody, both Buchalter and Shapiro disappeared. On November 9, 1937, the federal government offered a $5,000 reward for information leading to Buchalter's capture.

On December 1, 1937, the fugitive Buchalter was indicted in federal court on conspiracy to smuggle heroin into the United States. The scheme involved heroin hidden in the trunks of young women and couples traveling by ocean liner from China to France, then to New York City. Lepke bribed U.S. customs agents not to inspect the trunks.

On April 14, 1938, Shapiro surrendered to authorities in New York. However, Buchalter remained a fugitive.

Over the next two years, an extensive manhunt was conducted in both the United States and Europe, with reports of Buchalter hiding in Poland and Israel. On July 29, 1939, Thomas Dewey requested that the City of New York offer a $25,000 reward for Buchalter's capture, citing a string of unsolved gangland murders. On August 24, 1939, Buchalter surrendered to FBI chief J. Edgar Hoover in front of a Manhattan hotel. The surrender deal was allegedly negotiated by the columnist and radio broadcaster Walter Winchell. It was later revealed that Buchalter had been hiding in New York City during his entire time as a fugitive.

After Buchalter was convicted on the federal narcotics trafficking charges, federal authorities turned him over to New York State for trial on labor extortion charges. On April 5, 1940, Buchalter was sentenced to 30 years to life in state prison on those charges. However, Buchalter was sent to Leavenworth Federal Penitentiary in Kansas to serve his federal sentence of 14 years for narcotics trafficking.

On August 20, 1940, Buchalter was indicted on murder charges in Los Angeles for the killing of Harry Greenberg, a mob associate of casino owner Meyer Lansky and mobster Bugsy Siegel. However, Buchalter never went to trial on this killing.

== Murder trial ==
On May 9, 1941, Buchalter was arraigned in New York state court on the 1936 Rosen murder along with three other murders. Buchalter's order for the Rosen hit had been overheard by mobster Abe Reles, who turned state's evidence in 1940 and implicated Buchalter in four murders. Returned from Leavenworth to Brooklyn to stand trial for the Rosen slaying, Buchalter's position was worsened by the testimony of Albert "Tick-Tock" Tannenbaum. Four hours into deliberation, at 2 am on November 30, 1941, the jury found Buchalter guilty of first degree murder.

On December 2, 1941, Lepke was sentenced to death along with his lieutenants Emanuel "Mendy" Weiss and Louis Capone. Buchalter's lawyers immediately filed an appeal.

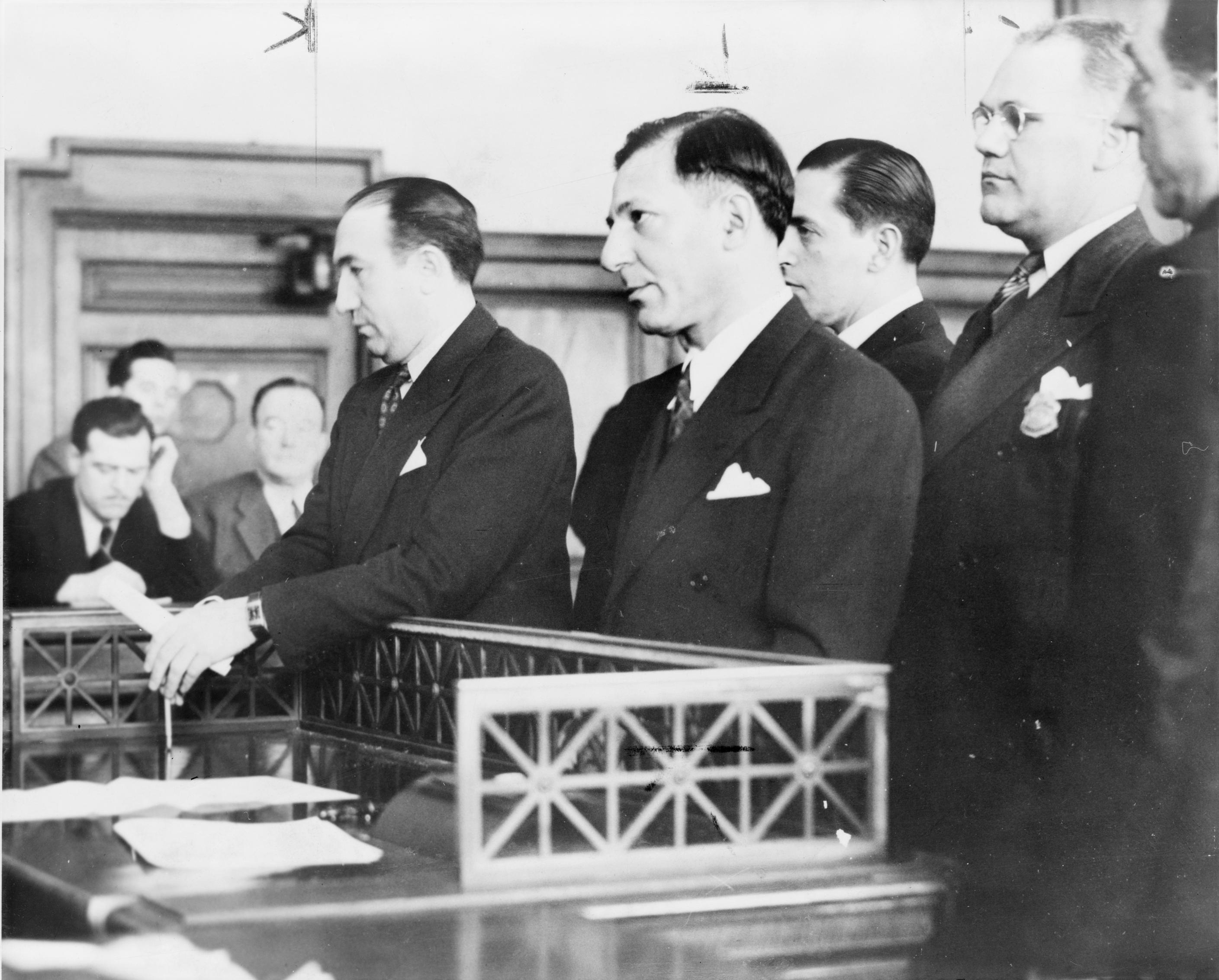
Buchalter during his 1941 sentencing in New York for murder

In October 1942, the New York Court of Appeals voted four to three to uphold Buchalter's conviction and death sentence. Two dissenting judges thought the evidence was so weak that errors in the jury instructions as to how to evaluate certain testimony were harmful enough to require a new trial. The third dissenter agreed, but added that, in his opinion, there was insufficient evidence to sustain a guilty verdict, so the indictment should be dismissed altogether, since the failure to prove the elements of the case required Buchalter's acquittal.

Buchalter's lawyers then petitioned for review by the United States Supreme Court. The Court voted to review the case, but then affirmed Buchalter's conviction seven to zero, with two justices abstaining. His appeals were now exhausted.

== Execution ==
When the U.S. Supreme Court confirmed Buchalter's conviction, he was serving his racketeering sentence at Leavenworth Federal Prison. New York State authorities demanded that the federal government turn Buchalter over to them for execution. On January 21, 1944, after many delays and much controversy, federal agents finally turned Buchalter over to state authorities, who immediately transported him to Sing Sing prison. Buchalter made several pleas for mercy, but they were rejected.

On March 4, 1944, Louis Buchalter was executed in the electric chair in Sing Sing. He had no final words. A few minutes before Buchalter's execution, his lieutenants Weiss and Capone were also executed.

Louis Buchalter was buried at the Mount Hebron Cemetery in Flushing, Queens.

== In popular culture ==
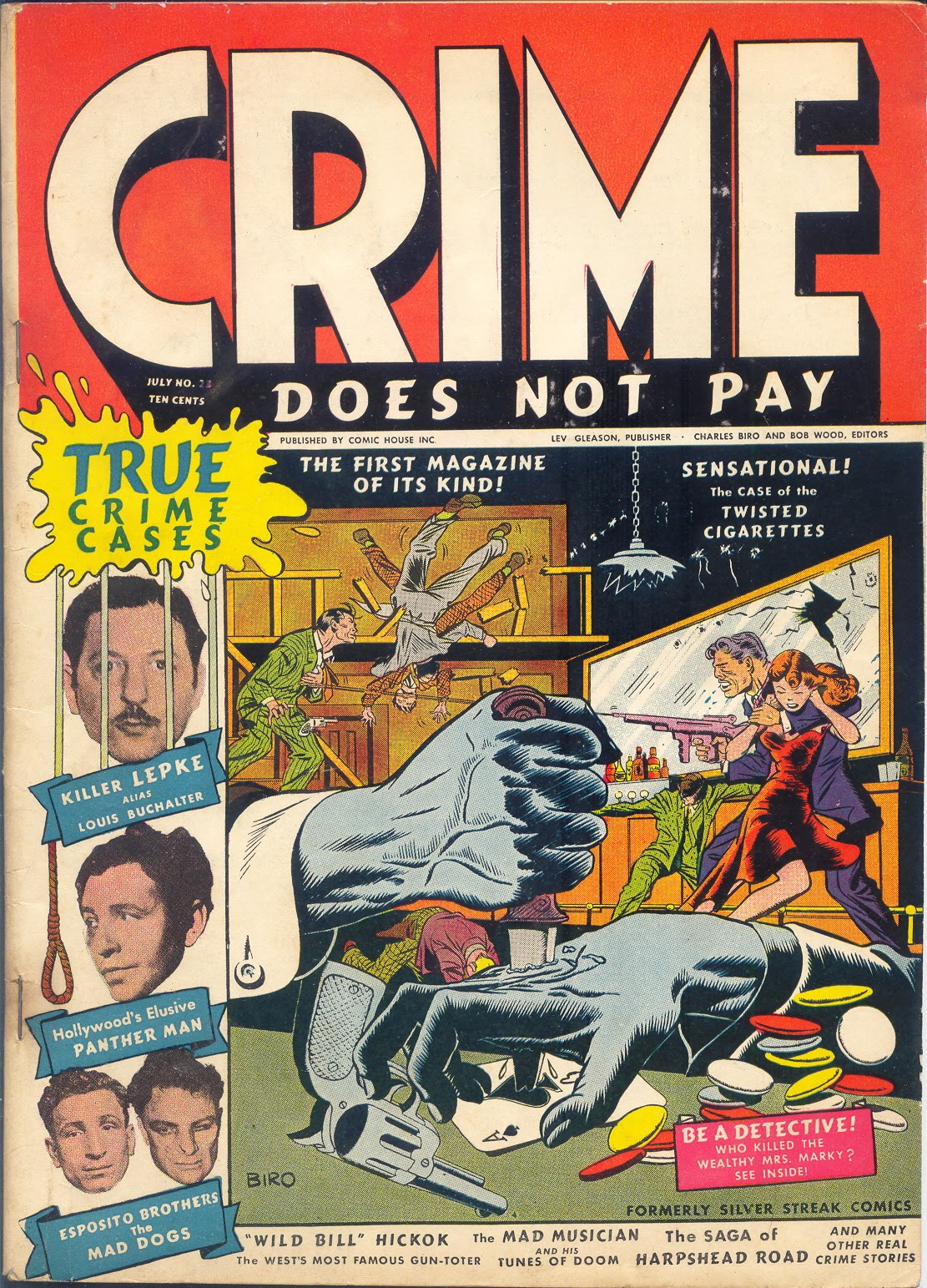
Cover of the first issue of Crime Does Not Pay (Lev Gleason Publications, July 1942), featuring the story of "Killer Lepke - alias Louis Buchalter"

During the late 1950s and early 1960s, Buchalter was portrayed by David J. Stewart in the 1960 film Murder, Inc.; by Gene Roth, Robert Carricart, and Joseph Ruskin in The Untouchables television series of 1959; as well as by John Vivyan and Shepherd Sanders in The Lawless Years television series.

The 1975 film Lepke, starring Tony Curtis, was based on Buchalter's life. Other portrayals include the 1981 film Gangster Wars by Ron Max.

Buchalter is also mentioned in "The Legend of Tennessee Moltisanti," the eighth episode of the first season of the HBO television series The Sopranos.

The poet Robert Lowell encountered Buchalter in prison during the 1940s, when Lowell was incarcerated for being a conscientious objector. Lowell described Buchalter (whom he calls "Czar Lepke") in his poem "Memories of West Street and Lepke", published in his book Life Studies (1959). Lowell's poem claims that prior to execution, Lepke had been lobotomized. Their meeting is discussed in the 1993 film Romeo Is Bleeding, where Lepke says he is in prison because he killed someone and Lowell says he is in prison because he did not kill someone.

The Making of the Mob: New York (2015) – Buchalter was portrayed by Evan Boymel.

== See also ==
- Capital punishment in New York (state)
- Capital punishment in the United States
- List of people executed in New York
- List of people executed in the United States in 1944
