= 1910s in organized crime =

This is a list of organized crime in the 1910s, arranged chronologically.

== 1910 ==
=== Events ===
- Rival newspapers William Randolph Hearst's Chicago American and the Chicago Tribune extend contracts through Moses Annenberg to street gangs such as Ragen's Colts, under the guise of "athletic clubs", in which newsdealers and vendors are intimidated into selling a specific newspaper. During the three-year period known as the "Circulation Wars", 27 street vendors are stabbed, beaten or shot as many of the future Prohibition gangsters and other criminals of Chicago's underworld become involved, including Dean O'Banion.
- New York police arrest over 200 known Italian gangsters and known Black Hand members in a raid in Little Italy, including Morello crime family leader Lupo the Wolf. However, none are convicted as many of the notes of extortion threats cannot be traced to them.
- Chicago racketeer James "Big Jim" Colosimo brings his nephew Johnny Torrio, then with New York City's Five Points Gang, to eliminate the Black Hand from the city in response to their extortion demands. Within a month, ten Black Hand extortionists had been killed.
- Jim Cosmano, a major Chicago Black Hand leader, is severely wounded in an ambush by Johnny Torrio on a South Side bridge. Cosmano had previously demanded $10,000 threatening to destroy Colosimo's café.
- Gas House Gang member William Jones is imprisoned.
- Eastman Gang leader Chick Tricker's Park Row dive bar is closed by the New York City Committee of Fourteen. However he moves his operations, purchasing Dan the Dude's Stag Cafe on West 28th Street, later renaming it the Cafe Maryland.
- January 1 – March 26, 1911 – Thirty-eight Black Hand victims are killed by Black Hand assassins, many by the unidentified assassin known only as Shotgun Man, between Oak Street and Milton Street in Chicago's Little Italy.
- April 1 – Spanish Louie, a lieutenant of Humpty Jackson, is killed while walking on East 11th Street by an unknown gunman (although other sources have incorrectly claimed 1900 and 1911).

=== Births ===
- Frank Abbandando "The Dasher", Murder, Inc. "hitman"
- Albert Facchiano, "Chinky" Genovese crime family member
- February 6 – Carlos Marcello [Calagero Menacore], New Orleans Mafia Don
- February 21 – Carmine Galante "Lilo"/"The Cigar", Bonanno crime family Don
- May 11 – Angelo Bruno "The Gentle Don"/"The Docile Don", Philadelphia Mafia leader
- October 1 – Bonnie Parker, sidekick and lover of Clyde Barrow

=== Deaths ===
- April 1 – John "Spanish Louie" Lewis, New York gangster and member of the Humpty Jackson Gang.

== 1911 ==
=== Events ===
- Five Points Gang member James T. "Biff" Ellison is sentenced to Sing Sing Prison for the attempted murder of gang leader Paul Kelly. He dies several years later in an insane asylum.
- Jack Zelig is arrested for robbing a bordello. The charges are later dropped. However, in an attempt to gain leadership of the Eastman Gang, lieutenants Jack Sirocco and Chick Tricker refuse to post bail, beginning a gang war between the two factions.
- Nathan Kaplan severely injures Johnny Spanish in a knife fight before police arrive to break up the fight. Kaplan also fights Jacob Orgen later that year giving a scar across Orgen's face before the fight is stopped.
- Filippo "John 'Handsome Johnny' Roselli" Sacco arrives with his family in the United States, from Sicily.
- Frank Tieri emigrates to the United States from Castel Gandolfo, Italy.
- Salvatore Sabella lands in the US and soon takes control of the Philadelphia Mafia.
- December 1 – "Big" Jim O'Leary sells off his gambling operations and other business interests and goes into retirement.
- December 2 – Julie Morrell, an assassin hired by Sirocco and Tricker to murder Zelig, is lured to a Second Avenue nightclub and killed.

=== Births ===
- Philip Lombardo, (Miami) Genovese crime family leader
- May 1 – Anthony Salerno "Fat Tony", Genovese crime family Don
- November 4 – James Napoli "Jimmy Nap", Genovese crime family member involved in illegal gambling and loansharking

=== Deaths ===
- December 2 – Julie Morrell, Eastman Gang member

== 1912 ==
=== Events ===
- Timothy "Big Tim" Sullivan, longtime political boss of Tammany Hall, is committed to a sanitarium.
- June 7 - Mock Duck is convicted of running a policy game and sentenced to imprisonment at Sing Sing Prison.
- July 15 – Members of the Lenox Avenue Gang including leader Harry Horowitz, known as "Gyp the Blood", and top lieutenants Jacob Seidenschner, Louis Rosenberg, and Francesco Cirofici, kill prominent New York gambler and police informant Herman "Beansie" Rosenthal. They are convicted of Rosenthal's murder later the same year, and executed in April 1914.
- September – Republican State's Attorney John E.W. Wayman, shortly before his term of office is to expire, officially closes down Chicago's South Side "Levee District". The long-time vice district had been a hotbed of criminal activity for Chicago's underworld, as well as a major source of political power for Chicago's First Ward aldermen, such as Michael "Hinky Dink" Kenna and "Bathhouse" John Coughlin, since the 1890s.
- October 5 – Eastman Gang leader Jack Zelig is killed by "Red" Phil Davidson on a Second Avenue street car trolley.
- October 19 – Frank Costello is again arrested for assault and robbery and is later released.
- October 24 - New York Police Lt. Charles Becker is found guilty of first degree murder in the Rosenthal case. He is sentenced to death, going to New York's electric chair in July 1915.
- November 6 – Owney Madden is shot by several thugs while at a 52nd Street dance in New York City.

=== Arts and literature ===
- D.W. Griffith's The Musketeers of Pig Alley is released starring Elmer Booth, Lillian Gish, Clara T. Bracy and Walter Miller.

=== Births ===
- January 8 – Joseph N. Gallo, alleged consigliere of Gambino crime family bosses Carlo Gambino, Paul Castellano and John Gotti
- March 19 – Nicholas Civella, Kansas City crime family boss
- April 12 – Jack "Spot" Comer, Jewish-English gangster
- September 18 – John T. Scalish, Cleveland crime family boss and National Crime Syndicate labor racketeer
- December 28 – William Daddano Sr., Chicago Outfit enforcer

=== Deaths ===
- July 15 – Herman "Beansie" Rosenthal, New York gambler and police informant
- October 5 – Jack Zelig, Eastman Gang leader

== 1913 ==
=== Events ===
- The White Hand Society disbands after police inaction and vigilantism in other Italian neighborhoods ends public support for the organization.
- Timothy Sullivan escapes from the sanitarium and is later found dead near a Westchester County freight yard.
- George Washington "Chuck" Connors, one of the last of the Tammany Hall associates, dies of heart failure in New York City's Hudson Street Hospital at the age of 61. Within several months, Frank "Mike the Dago" Salvatore succeeds Connors as the political boss of Chinatown.
- Cleveland gangster Thomas Joseph McGinty (aka T.J. McGinty) organizes a gang of labor sluggers competing against rival Cleveland News sluggers Arthur McBride's Mayfield Road Mob during Cleveland's "Circulation Wars".
- May 28 – A peace agreement is signed, with the exception of the Four Brothers, ending the tong war between the On Leong, Hip Sing, and the Kim Lan Wui Saw tongs.
- November 28 – Preparing to assault workers who had refused to strike, rival labor sluggers led by "Dopey" Benny Fein are met by a combined number of smaller gangs as street fighting breaks out in front of a Greenwich Street hat shop. This is the first of many skirmishes which will eventually lead up to the First Labor Slugger War.

=== Arts and literature ===
- The Gangster (1913) starring Lionel Adams, Ferdinand Tidmarsh and Edna Luby is released.

=== Births ===
- February 8 – Carmine Lombardozzi "The Doctor", New York labor racketeer, illegal gambling and drug trafficker as a Capodecina of the Gambino crime family and former associate of Meyer Lansky
- February 12 – Anthony Corallo "Tony Ducks", Lucchese crime family Don and Mafia Commission member
- March 26 – Victor Riesel, New York organized crime journalist
- April 30 – Sam DeCavalcante "The Plumber", New Jersey mobster
- October 6 – Leonard Patrick, Chicago Outfit member and informant

=== Deaths ===
- Timothy Sullivan, New York City gambling syndicate leader, Tammany Hall politician and associate of the Whyos and Monk Eastman street gangs.

== 1914 ==
=== Events ===
- During his first year in office, NYPD Police Commissioner Arthur Woods arrests more than 200 gangsters.
- Gas House Gang leader Thomas Lynch is killed during a gunfight with members of the Jimmy Curley Gang led by "Gold Mine" Jimmy Cariggio. The Gas House Gang breaks up soon after Lynch's death.
- Within two years of the closing of Chicago's infamous vice district The Levee, long-time vice lord Saffo the Greek is forced to flee the area. It is during this time that Chicago police captain Michael Ryan, district commander of The Levee, is dismissed from the force for corruption.
- Frank Costello, with his brother Edward, join Owney Madden's Gopher Gang.
- January 9 - A gunfight breaks out between members of Jack Sirocco's and Benjamin "Dopey Benny" Fein's gangs outside of a dance in St. Mark's Place in Manhattan. An elderly court clerk named Frederick Strauss is killed in the crossfire. (Two members of Fein's gang - Irving "Waxey Gordon" Wexler and Isidore "Jew Murphy" Cohen - are eventually charged for the murder and tried in 1916, but are acquitted for lack of evidence.)
- March 3 - New York gang leader James "Gold Mine Jimmy" Cariggio is shot dead by unknown gunmen near a bookstore on East 13th Street.
- March 13 - Former New York gang leader Thomas "Humpty" Jackson is arrested for selling opium near his home on Third Avenue. On March 27, Jackson is convicted and is later sentenced to six months in prison.
- April 13 - The four convicted gunmen in the 1912 murder of gambler Herman Rosenthal - Harry "Gyp the Blood" Horowitz, Francesco "Dago Frank" Cirofici, Louis "Lefty Louie" Rosenberg, and Jacob "Whitey Lewis" Seidenshner - are executed in the electric chair at Sing Sing prison. About two hours prior to the execution, Cirofici makes a statement to the warden suggesting that NYPD Lt. Charles Becker was not involved in the murder plot, and that Cirofici himself was not present at the slaying, though he admitted knowing about it. (Despite Cirofici's efforts to clear Becker, the policeman would be executed the following year.)
- April 17 – Five New York City gangsters are killed in a gunfight between Joe Morello and Joe Baker on 113th Street and Third Avenue.
- May – Following his arrest for assault earlier that year, New York labor racketeer "Dopey" Benny Fein agrees to testify against several gangsters and union leaders. In exchange for a reduced sentence, Fein reveals details of labor slugging operations from over five-year period resulting in the indictment of eleven gangsters and twenty two union officials.
- May 11 - Philip "Pinchy" Paul, a New York City labor racketeer, and rival to established labor gangsters such as Benjamin "Dopey Benny" Fein and Joseph "Joe the Greaser" Rosenzweig is shot and killed on Norfolk Street in Manhattan. Rosenzweig gunman Benjamin Snyder eventually confesses and informs against his boss, who is indicted for the murder in December.
- May 23 - Future Los Angeles crime family boss Joseph "Iron Man" Ardizzone is arrested for allegedly assaulting his future wife, the 15-year-old Elsa Marie Ellenberger, and as a suspect in the 1906 murder of mobster George Maisano.
- July – Shortly after being brought to Chicago by his cousin John Torrio, New York gunman Rocco "Roxie" Vanilli is arrested for the murder of a Chicago police officer in Chicago's infamous vice district, The Levee, on July 16.
- November – Patsy Doyle is killed by Owney Madden after Doyle attempts to take leadership of the Gopher Gang.
- November 11 - Lorito Monastero, the brother of future Pittsburgh crime family boss Stefano Monastero, is indicted for the murder of Stefano's estranged mother-in-law in August.
- November 24 - Hired by members of the West Washington Market poultry trust, two Italian gunmen shoot New York City poultry dealer Barnet Baff dead on Thirteenth Avenue in Manhattan, and flee in a waiting auto.

=== Births ===
- Dominic Brooklier, Los Angeles crime family don
- March 15 – Aniello Dellacroce "Mr O'Neil"/"Polack", Gambino crime family underboss
- April 29 – Johnny Dio, Lucchese crime family capo and Murder, Inc. member
- June 2 – Anthony Giordano, St. Louis crime syndicate leader and New Orleans crime family associate
- July 29 – Mickey Cohen, Los Angeles mobster and New York representative
- November 14 – Jimmy Fratianno, Los Angeles Mafia member
- November 20 – Jackie Cerone "The Lackey", Chicago Outfit leader
- December 14 – Joe Colombo, Colombo crime family don and Italian-American Civil Rights League founder.
- December 15 – Samuel Carlisi "Wings", Chicago Outfit boss
- December 18 – Joseph Dippolito, underboss of the Los Angeles crime family

=== Deaths ===
- March 3 - James "Gold Mine Jimmy" Cariggio, New York City gang leader
- April 13 - Harry "Gyp the Blood" Horowitz, leader of the Lenox Avenue Gang
- April 13 - Francesco "Dago Frank" Cirofici, member of the Lenox Avenue Gang
- April 13 - Louis "Lefty Louie" Rosenberg, member of the Lenox Avenue Gang
- April 13 - Jacob "Whitey Lewis" Seidenshner, member of the Lenox Avenue Gang
- May 11 - Philip "Pinchy" Paul, New York City labor racketeer

== 1915 ==
=== Events ===
- United States
  - A Black Hand gang in Chicago led by Sam Cardinelli begins years of setting off over eight hundred bombs, killing over twenty people and wounding hundreds more until 1920, when they are convicted of murder, and hanged the following year.
  - Benjamin Snyder, an associate of New York labor racketeer Joseph "Joe the Greaser" Rosenzweig, is convicted of murder and sentenced to twenty years' imprisonment
  - Peter H. Matthews is arrested, tried, and jailed for operating policy games throughout New York City.
  - Steve Wallace, with his brothers Frank and Jimmy Wallace of the Gustin Gang, begin hijacking and looting trucks in Southie often stripping cargo from the rear of the truck while stopped at intersections. The brothers are soon known by the press as the "Tailboard Thieves".
  - Al Capone joins the James Street Gang under Johnny Torrio, a satellite of the Five Points Gang.
  - March 12 – Frank Costello is arrested for carrying a concealed weapons after detectives receive information from an informant. Costello is sentenced to one year in Welfare Island prison by Judge Edward Swann and is released after ten months.
  - May 17 – Giosue Gallucci, also known as the undisputed King of Little Italy, who controlled the policy game in Italian Harlem (New York City) is shot together with his son. He died four days later.
  - July 30 – Former New York Police Lt. Charles Becker, twice convicted of murder in planning the killing of gambler and police informant Herman "Beansie" Rosenthal by members of the Lenox Avenue Gang in 1912, is executed in the electric chair at Sing Sing prison.
  - November 19 - Vincenzo "Vinent" Moreci, a "leading" member of the Italian community in New Orleans, as well as an apparent member of the city's Mafia family, is shot and killed near his home, reportedly in retaliation for having colluded with the Italian Vigilance Committee against the Black Hand kidnappers and murderers of eight-year-old Walter Lamana in 1907, but more likely as part of an internal Mafia feud.
- Japan
  - The Yamaguchi-gumi organization begins operating in Japan.

=== Arts and literature ===
- Sidney M. Goldin's The Last of the Mafia is released starring Jack J. Clark, William Conrad and Katherine Lee.

=== Births ===
- Salvatore Santoro "Tom Mix", Lucchese crime family mobster
- March 15 – Mario Anthony DeStefano, Chicago Outfit member
- June 20 – Paul Castellano "Big Paul", Gambino crime family Don
- November 15 – Santo Trafficante Jr., Tampa Mafia Don

=== Deaths ===
- May 21 - Giosue Gallucci, Camorra boss of Italian Harlem in New York City
- July 30 - Charles Becker, corrupt New York Police Lt. who planned the 1912 murder of gambler Herman Rosenthal
- November 19 - Vincenzo "Vincent" Moreci, Underboss of the New Orleans crime family

== 1916 ==
=== Events ===
- January 15 - William "Brother Mac" McNamara, a member of the Hudson Dusters gang, and an accomplice viciously assault an Italian gardener named Gregorio George near Dobbs Ferry, New York, leaving him for dead. George, whose wife hired the gangsters to kill her husband, dies of his injuries the following morning. Arrested in Hoboken on January 26, McNamara confesses to the crime and goes on trial in White Plains in June. Quickly convicted and sentenced to death, McNamara has his sentence commuted to life imprisonment the following year.
- March 26 - Three labor racketeers shoot film operator Hugh Coogan dead in Justine Street in Chicago. Irish-American gangster and corrupt union representative Edward "Spike" O'Donnell, leader of the Southside O'Donnell gang, is soon charged with the crime, but is acquitted by late spring.
- April 18 - Future Kansas City Mob boss John Lazia, who is currently a member of a robbery gang headed by John J. "Black Mike" McGovern, is arrested for attempting to rob the safe of a produce dealer on the Kansas side of the city.
- Summer – New York Police break up the last of the Manhattan street gangs, including the Hudson Dusters, from The Battery to Spuyten Duyvil. Many of these former gang members would become employed as labor sluggers. Street gangs would become non-existent in New York until the release of "Kid Dropper" Nathan Kaplan and Johnny Spanish the following year.
- July 20 - Aspiring Camorra boss Joseph Di Marco is found shot to death along with his bodyguard, Charles "Nine Fingered Charley" Lombardi, in a vacant flat on James Street in Manhattan.
- The Mafia-Camorra War begins in New York City between the Manhattan Sicilian and Neapolitan Brooklyn Mafia.
- September 7 – Nicholas Morello, leader of the Morello crime family, is killed with bodyguard Charles Ubriaco outside a Navy Street restaurant while arriving at peace negotiations with rival Pellegrino Morano.
- November 7 - Future Detroit Purple Gang boss Abe Bernstein is arrested in a police gambling raid on a poolroom and charged with running an illegal crap game.

=== Arts and literature ===
- Poor Little Peppina (film)

=== Births ===
- April 1 – Gus Alex, Chicago Outfit member
- June 10 – Peter Joseph LoCascio "Mr. Bread", New York City (Lower East Side) syndicate mobster involved in narcotics

=== Deaths ===
- July 20 - Joseph Di Marco, member of the Camorra in New York City
- July 20 - Charles "Nine Fingered Charley" Lombardi, member of the Camorra in New York City
- September 7 – Nicholas Morello, Morello crime family leader
- September 7 – Charles Ubriaco, Morello crime family member

== 1917 ==
=== Events ===
- Former Five Points Gang members Nathan Kaplan and Johnny Spanish, are released from prison. They form a criminal gang together, made up mostly of ex-Five Pointers, to take the place of now imprisoned labor racketeers Benjamin "Dopey Benny" Fein and Joseph "Joe the Greaser" Rosenzweig.
- February 14 - After saloonkeeper Vincent Butera is found murdered in his bar, police question Dominick Giambrone, boss of the St. Louis crime family, about the murder.
- June 7 - Fueled by the ongoing race riots in East St. Louis, a riot breaks out in the quarry of a prison workhouse between the white and black inmates. The violence escalates when Henry Griesser, a member of Egan's Rats, steals a gun from one of the guards, and begins firing at the black prisoners. The riot is finally quelled when local firemen train their firehose on the rioters. Ten black prisoners and two white prisoners are hospitalized as a result of the riot.
- September 21 - Giovanni "Johnny Spanish" Mistretta and one of his men are convicted in federal court of attempting to sell heroin to a soldier, and are sentenced to fifteen months in prison. (In the New York City papers of the time, Johnny Spanish is reported as having a real name of "Harry Weinberg," a possible alias.)
- November 5 - Rosario "Sam" Matranga, boss of the Matranga Mafia faction in Los Angeles, is shot at close range with a shotgun while sitting in his parked car in front of his home.
- November 30 - Based on the testimony of informant Ralph "the Barber" Daniello, the New York County grand jury issues seventeen indictments for murder against members of the local Camorra.
- December 18 - A little over a month after the murder of Los Angeles Mafioso and faction boss Sam Matranga, his cousin and successor, Pietro "Peter" Matranga, is also shot dead at the intersection of Eastlake Avenue and Henry Street. Shortly afterwards, police begin searching for Mike Marino, who is suspected of killing both Matrangas as well as Tony Pariese in November 1916.
- December 23 - Having stopped three Italians on suspicion of carrying concealed weapons, Akron Patrolman Guy Norris begins searching one of the suspects when one of the man's companions pulls out a revolver and shoots the policeman in the chest point blank, damaging his spinal cord and causing instant paralysis. Although the gravely injured policeman is quickly taken to the hospital and manages to live through the day and into the night, he dies early in the morning on Christmas Eve. (Unbeknownst to the authorities at the time, Patrolman Norris's murder is just the first in a personal vendetta against the Akron police by Black Hand gang leader Rosario Borgio in retaliation for their frequent harassment of him, and Borgio has even offered a cash bounty for every cop that is killed in this campaign of revenge.)

==== Al Capone ====
It was through the Five Points gang that Al Capone came to the attention of brutal New York mobster Frankie Yale. In 1917, 18-year-old Al Capone went to work for Yale at the Harvard Inn as a bartender and as a waiter and bouncer when needed. Capone watched and learned as Yale used violence to maintain control over his empire.

One day while working at the Harvard Inn, Capone saw a man and woman sitting at a table. After his initial advances were ignored, Capone went up to the good-looking woman and whispered in her ear, "Honey, you have a nice ass and I mean that as a compliment." The man with her was her brother, Frank Gallucio. Defending his sister's honor, Gallucio punched Capone. However, Capone didn't let it end there; he decided to fight back. Gallucio then took out a knife and slashed at Capone's face, managing to cut Capone's left cheek three times (one of which cut Capone from ear to mouth). The scars left from this attack led to Capone's nickname of "Scarface," a name he personally hated.

=== Births ===
- May 24 – Anthony Provenzano "Tony Pro", Genovese Crime Family Caporegime and New Jersey labor union racketeer

=== Deaths ===
- November 5 - Rosario "Sam" Matranga, leader of the Matranga faction of the Los Angeles crime family
- December 18 - Pietro "Peter" Matranga, leader of the Matranga faction of the Los Angeles crime family

== 1918 ==
=== Events ===
- Frankie Yale takes leadership of the Unione Siciliane after founder Ignazio "the Wolf" Lupo is convicted of numerous charges ranging from extortion to murder.
- Tong leader Mock Duck, upon his release from Sing Sing prison, retires from crime.
- Jan. 10 - Just over two weeks following the murder of Akron Patrolman Guy Norris in December, two more patrolmen, Edward Costigan and Joseph Hunt, are ambushed and shot from behind with automatic revolvers while on their way home from work. Costigan is instantly killed, while Hunt dies in the hospital two nights later. Following the shooting, three "gangsters" - likely members of Rosario Borgio's gang - are observed fleeing from the scene.
- March 4 - Chicago Black Hand gang leader Sam Cardinelli fires a gun at Chicago Detective Charles Eitz, missing the policeman and hitting a young mother out with her baby in the knee. Although the woman drops her baby, the baby is not hurt, and Eitz is able to capture Cardinelli later the same day. Charged with assault with intent to kill, Cardinelli is acquitted of the crime in September.
- March 12 - A fourth Akron policeman, Patrolman Gethin Richards, is fatally shot in a shootout with members of Rosario Borgio's gang, and dies in the hospital that afternoon. Unlike with the previous murders, however, several of the gang are quickly apprehended, and Borgio himself is arrested the following day at a hotel.
- April 1 - In a case similar to that of Herman Rosenthal, New York gambler Harry Cohen is shot dead in his apartment building shortly after he had contacted the assistant district attorney to arrange a meeting with him to provide information about other gamblers. Morris "Big Morris" Rothenberg, another gambler, is arrested as a suspect soon after, but is acquitted at trial in October.
- May 17 - Black Hand gang leader Rosario Borgio is convicted of first degree murder in the killing of Akron police officer Gethin Richards in March. Eight days later, on May 25, Borgio is sentenced to death in the electric chair.
- June 6 – Ciro Terranova is charged with ordering the deaths of Charles Lombardi, Joe DiMarco and Michael Hayes. However, the case is later dropped.
- July 20 - In Swoyersville, Pennsylvania, mobster Ignatz Cosmano is shot dead on Oliver St. following an argument with another unidentified man, who escapes into the night after fatally shooting another man who attempts to pursue him. The following Monday, July 22, the local newspapers mistakenly identify Cosmano as Santo Volpe, the boss of the Mafia in Northwestern Pennsylvania. The following day, the papers correct their mistake, explaining that the body of Cosmano, who was apparently a Volpe henchman, was found with Volpe's business card in his pocket.

=== Births ===
- Michael James Genovese, Pittsburgh crime family Boss and possible cousin of Vito Genovese
- January 31 – Philip Rastelli "Rusty", Bonanno crime family Don

=== Deaths ===
- April 1 - Harry Cohen, New York City gambler
- July 20 - Ignatz Cosmano, member of the Bufalino crime family

== 1919 ==
=== Events ===
- Al Capone leaves New York, after an altercation with a member of the White Hand Gang, going to Chicago, where he becomes a top lieutenant to Johnny Torrio.
- Recently imprisoned criminal Joe Valachi encounters inmate and future mentor New York mobster Alessandro Vollero.
- Salvatore Sabella becomes leader of the Philadelphia crime syndicate.
- Frank Costello forms a novelty company which makes Kewpie dolls in punchboard games. By the following year Costello had made $80,000 ($1.5 million today), which he used to become a bootlegger at the start of Prohibition.
- January 3 - Detroit Mafia boss Antonio "Tony" Giannola is shot dead as he walks from his car toward a house on Rivard Street.
- January 19 - During a police raid on a crap game on West Fifty-Seventh St. in New York City, gambler and crime boss Arnold Rothstein draws his revolver and fires through the doors, wounding two police detectives and piercing the coat of another. Rothstein, who had previously been the victim of armed robberies in the past, believed the police raiders were more robbers attempting to holdup his latest high-stakes game. In late July, the charges against Rothstein are dropped.
- February 14 - During a raid on a gambling den on Eleventh St., Buffalo police arrest fourteen men, including the owner, Benedetto Angelo "Buffalo Bill" Palmeri, underboss of the Buffalo crime family. The following day, Palmeri and another man are fined for having unlicensed revolvers.
- February 21 - Cleveland Black Hand leader Rosario Borgio and Frank Mazzanno are executed in the electric chair for the murder of Akron police officer Gethin Richards in March 1918.
- February 27 - Around midnight, Frank Costello and a friend are arrested in Buffalo for carrying concealed weapons. In March, both men are convicted and sent to prison.
- April 20 - Thomas Egan, founder of Egan's Rats as well as a Democratic ward politician, dies of Bright's Disease at the age of 44 at his home in St. Louis.
- May 19 - Around midnight at the Arrowhead Inn, a saloon in the village of Burnham near Chicago, Vincenzo "Big Jim" Colosimo, the owner of the saloon, confronts Chicago Tribune reporter Morrow Krum and physically assaults him with the help of another unidentified man. The reporter had been overheard on the telephone reporting back to his employer about the Arrowhead Inn and other local saloons. Later that day, Colosimo is arrested in Chicago for assault and battery, but quickly bonds out.
- July 26 - While he is playing poker at the Marginal Club on Eighth Avenue, Thomas "Tanner" Smith, former leader of the Marginals gang, is shot from behind and killed. Later witnesses identify rival gangsters Robert "Rubber" Shaw, George "Chick" Lewis, and a third man as Smith's killers.
- July 29 – New York labor slugger Johnny Spanish is killed by three unidentified gunman possibly including rival gangster Nathan Kaplan.
- July 31 - Hudson Dusters leader Robert "Rubber" Shaw is killed and George "Chick" Lewis is wounded in a shooting in Hoboken, New Jersey, likely in retaliation for the murder of Tanner Smith on the 26th.
- August 5 - Two days after the end of the Chicago race riot, ten members of the Ragen's Colts gang are arrested after threatening to steal the weapons of militiamen protecting the black neighborhoods and use them to reignite the racial violence there. The suspects are soon released, however.
- September 1 - Claiming self-defense, gambler Marty Guilfoyle shoots and kills Chicago gangster and labor racketeer Peter Gentleman at a cigar store that Guilfoyle owns, apparently in a dispute over gambling interests.
- September 9 - Following a car chase, Chicago detectives capture a gang of six suspected safe burglars, including Earl "Hymie" Weiss (identified in the paper as "Harold Werss"). The detectives also find burglar's tools and half a bottle of nitro glycerin in the thieves' automobile.
- October 1 - The first game of the 1919 World Series takes place in Cincinnati between the Chicago White Sox and the Cincinnati Reds, with the heavily favored White Sox losing to the Reds 9 to 1. The Reds would go on to win the Series, 5 games to 3, largely as a result of a conspiracy between eight members of the White Sox and a syndicate of professional gamblers, alleged to have been planned by New York City gambler and gang leader Arnold Rothstein in what would come to be known as the Black Sox Scandal.
- October 2 - Salvatore "Sam" Giannola, the boss of the Detroit Mafia ever since the murder of his cousin, Tony Giannola, back in January, is shot multiple times as he is leaving a bank at the intersection of Russell St. and Monroe Ave. He is able to walk back inside before collapsing and dying.

=== Births ===
- James "Jimmy Brown" Failla, senior caporegime for the Gambino crime family and labor union racketeer
- Gennaro Jay "Jerry" Angiulo, former Patriarca crime family underboss
- January 14 – Giulio Andreotti, Italian Prime Minister and mafia associate
- April 21 – Licio Gelli, Italian mason and mafia associate

=== Deaths ===
- January 3 - Antonio "Tony" Giannola, leader of the Giannola faction of the Detroit Mafia
- February 21 – Rosario Borgio, Cleveland Black Hand leader
- February 21 - Frank Mazzanno, member of Rosario Borgio's Black Hand gang
- April 20 - Thomas Egan, St. Louis politician and founder of Egan's Rats
- July 26 - Thomas "Tanner" Smith, leader of the Marginals
- July 29 – Johnny Spanish, Five Points Gang member and labor racketeer
- July 31 - Robert "Rubber" Shaw, leader of the Hudson Dusters
- September 1 - Peter Gentleman, Chicago gangster and labor racketeer
- October 2 - Salvatore "Sam" Giannola, leader of the Giannola faction of the Detroit Mafia
