= Peter Madden (gang leader) =

American gang leader

- Disappeared: 1914; New York
- Other names: Punk Madden; Slippery Madden
- Known for: New York gang leader and labor racketeer; ally of Philip "Pinchy" Paul during the "Labor Slugger War".

Peter "Punk" Madden (fl. 1910–1914) was an American thief, gang leader and labor racketeer allied with Philip "Pinchy" Paul during the first "Labor Slugger War" against Joseph "Joe the Greaser" Rosenzweig and Benjamin "Dopey Benny" Fein.

== Arrest ==
In June 1914, Madden was arrested for his suspected involvement in a street mugging. His arrest taking place shortly after midnight, he successfully escaped custody twice before finally being returned in the prison attached to the Yorkville Court at the end of the day. It was during one of these escapes that he visited the office of District Attorney Charles S. Whitman in which he claimed he was not being given a "square deal" by police and asked for protection. He made another, and this time successful, escape attempt from The Tombs three months later.

== First escape ==
On June 17, 1914, Madden was arrested for complicity in the mugging of a Mrs. Artha Ingram, a collector for the Phips Model Tenements, near her office at East 31st Street. He was taken in by police, matching the description given by the victim, and identified by Ingram as one of the three attackers. He was taken to Yorkville Court by the arresting detective for trial where he pleaded not guilty. The detective then left Madden in a temporary detention room while he left to fill out paperwork for the prisoner's pedigree and when he returned two minutes later Madden had disappeared. There were two exits in the room, one past the complaint room where the detective was and the other through the courtroom. However no one saw Madden use either of these exits. Although several theories were later suggested, Madden himself refused to say.

He remained missing for over two hours before arriving at the District Attorney's office where he approached Lloyd Willis, a secretary for District Attorney Charles S. Whitman, explaining he had walked from the courthouse and asked for protection from the police who were trying to "frame him up". He admitted he had been in the area where the mugging took place and had heard from bystanders that a woman had lost her purse, but denied his involvement. Madden was given assurances by Assistant District Attorney Aaron J. Conlon that he would receive a fair trial and sent for police to escort him back Yorkville for trial.

Madden was apparently angered believing his confidence was betrayed and that he was imprisoned despite his innocence. Once back at the courthouse, he was allowed to use the washroom. The only other exit was a high window guarded by a heavy iron grating and spikes which covered six or eight inches from the top of the window and nearly ten feet from the floor. Madden was able to escape the room by opening up the window slightly, shinnying up a water pipe and sliding over the top of the sash and the points of the spikes. Once outside, he found himself on the roof of the women's detention center and climbed over the heavy wire screening where he dropped 15 feet to the ground. This was the private corridor where the magistrate entered the court building. He then left the corridor, down a winding staircase, and escaped through a side door where he proceeded down 57th Street towards Third Avenue.

In the meantime, the alarm had been raised when court officials had found Madden had disappeared. It was at that moment that Morris W. Reedy, an officer for the Department of Corrections and captain of its steamship the Josephine Whitney, had spotted Madden leaving the building. He immediately alerted police and detectives, then frantically searching the courthouse, and began chasing Madden. They pursued Madden all the way down to Third Avenue, where Madden managed to dodge a speeding car, before being caught by two detectives as he ran towards 56th Street. Madden was taken back once again, arraigned and held on a $5,000 bail.

== Second escape ==
Sent to The Tombs, he was tried in another mugging with John Ryan. They were both charged with stealing the wallet of a William Beard in Madison Square on June 25. The wallet contained only $1, yet he and Ryan were charged with grand larceny. On September 10, he and Ryan were handcuffed together and marched with ten other prisoners from The Tombs and across the Bridge of Sighs to the nearby Criminal Courts Building. Under the charge of two deputy sheriffs, the party were met by the two arresting detectives, who discovered that Madden was missing. Finding Ryan alone, he explained that Madden had escaped while crossing the bridge. However, authorities believed Madden had slipped away down one of the two unguarded stairways while the prisoners were marched through the second floor of the Criminal Courts Building. A request had been made by one of the officials earlier that year for gates to be placed at the stairways in order to prevent escape.

Madden was never seen again and what became of him is unknown.

== See also ==
- List of fugitives from justice who disappeared
