= Billy Lustig =

American gangster

- Born: William Lustig
- Died: August 16, 1913; Manhattan, New York City, U.S.
- Cause of death: Murdered
- Known for: New York gang leader and labor racketeer; ally of Philip "Pinchy" Paul during the first Labor Slugger War.

William Lustig (died 1913) was an American gang leader and labor racketeer. He was one of several independent gang leaders operating in Manhattan's Lower East Side and, along with Abe "Little Rhody" Roch and Philip "Pinchy" Paul, led a small coalition of gangs to break the monopoly held by Joseph "Joe the Greaser" Rosenzweig and Benjamin "Dopey Benny" Fein during the first "Labor Slugger War". Lustig was also employed as a clerk and whose brother was a detective attached to the office of District Attorney Charles S. Whitman.

== Biography ==
On the night of August 4, 1913, Lustig was followed by four unidentified men in a car while walking down Third Avenue. Lustig did not notice his pursuers and, upon reaching 14th Street, he walked into a coffee house owned by Humpty Jackson. Two of the gunmen followed Lustig into the establishment where, seeing Lustig at a table, they fired five times at him. Only two of their shots hit Lustig who fell to the ground with a bullet in his shoulder and stomach. The gunmen then returned outside and ran to 12th Street where their accomplices were already waiting, with the motor running, and sped off towards the North River. A crowd had already gathered in front of Jackson's place as soon as the first shots were heard and a few bystanders managed to chase the car all the way to Cooper Street before losing sight of them. One man was able to copy the license plate but police were unable to find a match in the state motor car records.

Upon questioning witnesses at the scene, one man claimed that Lustig and the other two men had been quarreling over a girl. Another version told to police was that Lustig had been lured to the coffee house by a telephone message from a young woman. Three pistols were found on the sidewalk outside. Police officials at the time suspected that the shooting was linked the murder of gambler Rosenthal murder case the previous year due to the similarities of both the method and escape as well as the car's description, a Shapiro's grey auto, with the noted exception of the license plates.

Lustig was found unconscious by officers arriving on the scene and was brought to Bellevue Hospital where he underwent surgery. Doctors initially stated that there was little hope of recovery, however Lustig was able to pull through and it was announced he was out of danger a day later. Lustig was questioned by Deputy Police Commissioner George Samuel Dougherty and his team of detectives, who were investigating the rising violence in the East Side, but Lustig refused to identify his attackers responding only that he would settle it on his own.

Of the two bullets, the one lodged near his spine was removed from his stomach upon his arrival at the hospital. The other bullet under the collarbone was to have been taken out later that week. On August 14, he left the hospital where he stayed at his mother's house.

Following the initial shooting, police concentrated their efforts in tracking down the woman who supposedly lured Lustig to the restaurant. The body of an unidentified woman found in Inwood days later was thought to have been that person. It was speculated that she had been killed when those behind Lustig's killing feared she might inform police under interrogation. On August 22, police detectives Emile Klinger and Paul Kaiser arrested a woman in Scranton, Pennsylvania believed to know the whereabouts of a key witness, Rose Harris, who was able to identify the four gunmen. After this shooting, not much is known about his whereabouts for several years. On July 30, 1919 he is arrested for murder of known gangster John Mestrett also known as "Johnny Spanish".
