= Shapiro Brothers =

American mobsters

NYPD mugshot of Meyer Shapiro

NYPD mugshot of Irving Shapiro

Meyer (1908–1931), Irving (1904–1931) and Willie Shapiro (1911–1934), collectively known as the Shapiro Brothers, were the leaders of a group of Jewish-American mobsters from New York City and based in Williamsburg. Well established in the local garment industry, long dominated by Jacob "Gurrah" Shapiro and Louis "Lepke" Buchalter since the 1927 death of Jacob "Little Augie" Orgen, the two began to move against them in the summer of 1931.

As the two sides battled for the garment industry in Brooklyn, Irving and Meyer were killed by Joseph and Louis Amberg; Irving was gunned down near his apartment on July 11, and Meyer was found shot to death in the basement of a tenement building on Manhattan's Lower East Side on September 17, 1931. On orders from Buchalter, Willie was killed by Murder, Inc. members Martin "Bugsy" Goldstein and Abe "Kid Twist" Reles, supposedly buried alive in a sandpit in the marshland of Canarsie by Reles, the Amberg brothers, Frank Abbandando and Harry Maione, on the night of July 20, 1934.

Reles implicated Buchalter in the murders during talks with District Attorney William O'Dwyer after agreeing to become a government informant in 1941. His later testimony resulted in the convictions of Buchalter and the rest of Murder, Inc., who were all sentenced to death.
