= Dropper (disambiguation) =

A dropper or Pasteur pipette is an instrument used to transfer small quantities of liquid.

Dropper may also refer to:

- Dropper (malware), a program that tries to install malware
- The Dropper, a 2000 album by experimental jazz fusion trio Medeski Martin & Wood
- a participant in the drop swindle
- an inhabitant of the "hippie commune" Drop City
- a reproductive structure used by the flowering plant Erythronium americanum

== See also ==
- Dropping (disambiguation)
- Nathan Kaplan (1891–1923), also known as "Kid Dropper" or "Jack the Dropper", American gangster
- Garrett Droppers (1860–1927), American academic and diplomat
