= Cornelius Willemse =

New York City policeman and detective

- Born: Cornelis Wilhelmus Joannes Maria Willemse; 30 September 1871; Rotterdam, Netherlands
- Died: 11 July 1942 (aged 70); Manhattan, New York City, U.S.
- Known for: Author of Behind the Green Lights and A Cop Remembers
- Police career
- Country: New York City Police Department
- Service years: 1900–1925
- Rank: Detective

Cornelis Wilhelmus Joannes Maria "Cornelius" Willemse (30 September 1871, Rotterdam - 11 July 1942, Manhattan) was a New York City policeman and detective from 1900 to 1925.

He was the author of two memoirs, Behind the Green Lights (1931) and A Cop Remembers (1933). His books are among the few reliable first-hand accounts of the criminal gangs and police methods of that time.

== Early life ==
Willemse emigrated from the Netherlands in 1888. After working as a bouncer at a Bowery saloon he joined the police department in February 1900 as a patrolman. He witnessed, and described in his books, the evolution of the New York City Police Department from a corruption-ridden, antiquated institution into a considerably more modern police department.

== Police career and memoirs ==
"Behind the Green Lights," published in 1931, describes Willemse's rise from patrolman in the mainly Irish-American NYPD, to acting Captain in the homicide squad. It describes his service in some of the roughest neighborhoods of the city at the time, including Chinatown, the Lower East Side and Tenderloin.

In that memoir and "A Cop Remembers," published in 1933, Willemse makes candid revelations of the often brutal police methods used at the time, as well as a rare law enforcement perspective on the gangs of New York during the Prohibition and pre-Prohibition era.

His books, which were well received at the time and are now frequently quoted in historical literature, Willemse discusses at length his use of "third degree" interrogation methods on prisoners.

Willemse also describes his confrontations with major gang members of the early 20th Century, including Kid Dropper, Little Augie Orgen and Tom Flanagan.

A highly fictionalized version of "Behind the Green Lights" was produced as a motion picture by a small production company in 1935.

== Quotes ==
"Detectives and policemen, as a class, are athletic men. They like games and sports and their minds and inclinations are healthy. They make mistakes, of course, but they seldom beat a man who doesn't deserve it. I'll admit that when a hold-up mob is brought into court with faces bandaged, it can be assumed that all of them didn't fall down stairs or roll off a cell bunk, accidentally. But neither does the hold-up man or the gun pull his trigger accidentally."

"The 'Third Degree' is not without its humorous moments."

"I was no saint. But I was told that I was a good cop."—Cornelius Willemse in "Behind the Green Lights."
