= Morris Kessler =

American mobster and member of Joseph Amberg's gang in Brooklyn during the early 1930s

- Born: January 6, 1912; New York City, New York, United States
- Died: September 30, 1935 (aged 23); Brownsville, Brooklyn, New York, United States
- Cause of death: Murdered
- Body discovered: Blake-Christopher Garage, 385 Blake Avenue, Brownsville, Brooklyn, New York, U.S.
- Resting place: Mount Hebron Cemetery, Flushing, Queens, New York, U.S.
- Known for: chauffeur and bodyguard of New York mobster Joseph Amberg.

Morris L. Kessler (January 6, 1912 – September 30, 1935) was an American mobster and member of Joseph Amberg's gang in Brooklyn during the early 1930s. As Amberg's personal chauffeur and bodyguard, Kessler was a close associate in his organization until he was killed alongside his boss at a Brownsville auto garage by members of Murder, Inc. in 1935. The gangland slayings of Kessler and Amberg were among the first major contract killings committed by Murder, Inc. and was one of the most publicized of the era.

== Biography ==
Morris L. Kessler was born in New York City on January 6, 1912. Although he had no known criminal record during his life, he had become a member of Brooklyn mobsters Joseph and Louis "Pretty" Amberg criminal organization in Brownsville by the early 1930s. Kessler became Joe Amberg's personal chauffeur and bodyguard.

On the afternoon of September 30, 1935, at 12:45 pm, Kessler and Amberg stopped at the Blake-Christopher auto garage at Blake and Christopher Avenues prior to collecting "protection money" from neighborhood barber shops and restaurants. As they prepared to leave in their limousine, however, three unidentified gunmen believed to be members of Murder, Inc. entered the garage. Armed with pistols, they forced the two men against the wall at gunpoint. According to the owner Henry Kutnetz and mechanics Nat Horowitz and August Mattern, all of whom witnessed the incident, the gunmen taunted the two men before gunning them down. They shot Amberg first and then Kessler; police later found Kessler had been shot once in the forehead and three times in the back. The two men were buried at Mount Hebron Cemetery in Flushing, Queens, two days later.

Louis Amberg had been killed only three weeks before, the Ambergs being involved in a gang war with rivals Louis "Lepke" Buchalter and Jacob "Gurrah" Shapiro, though authorities believed the murders of Kessler and Amberg were linked to the then-recent deaths of small-time racketeers Abe Meer and Irving Amron. Although the getaway car used in the murder was later found by authorities, the crime remained unsolved.
