= Facchiano =

Facchiano is an Italian surname. Notable people with the surname include:

- Albert Facchiano (1910–2011), American mobster
- Ferdinando Facchiano (1927–2022), Italian lawyer and politician
