= Al Rooney =

A.J. Rooney
- Born: 1892
- Occupation: Unemployed
- Status: Paroled on June 27, 1919
- Convictions: kidnapping and attempted murder
- Criminal charges: kidnapping and attempted murder
- Penalty: Two and a half years

Albert "Al" Rooney (1892-?) was an American gang leader and founder of the Fourteenth Street Gang. One of the independent gangs allied with Monk Eastman, most of them former members of the Humpty Jackson gang, Rooney led the group from the mid-to late 1900s (decade) until the New York City Police Department launched a four-year citywide campaign to break up the countless street gangs operating in the city between 1910 and 1914. Rooney was one of the first gang leaders to be imprisoned and, with his conviction of second degree murder in 1911, is considered one of the last generation gang captains of the "Gangs of New York" period.

In June 1911, he was tried for the murder of a Dominick Martello with whom he had gotten into an altercation with at a dance at the Stuyvessant Casino held by the Harry J. Callahan Association three months earlier. Martello was alleged to have assaulted him and Rooney left to get a revolver. He returned a short time later and ambushed him in the hallway of the casino shooting him three times in the back. One of the bullets severed Martello's spinal cord, however he later died from his wounds. Rooney was one of several criminals to be prosecuted by District Attorney's Frank Moss and Edward R. O'Malley with William Jones, Biff Ellison and Johnny Spanish being tried that same week. He was convicted of second degree murder and sentenced to serve between twenty years and life imprisonment in Sing Sing. His sentence was later commuted to eight years by Governor Al Smith due to the recommendation of District Attorney Charles D. Newton on account of Rooney's age at the time of his conviction. He was officially released on parole on June 27, 1919.
