= Harold Hopkins =

Harold Hopkins may refer to:

- Harold Hopkins (physicist) (1918–1994), British physicist
- Harold Hopkins (actor) (1944–2011), Australian actor
- Harold A. Hopkins Jr. (1930–2019), bishop of the Episcopal Diocese of North Dakota
- Harold Hopkins, English politician, successful candidate in North Devon District Council election, 1999

== See also ==
- Harold Hopkins Miranda (born 1971), Puerto Rican musician
- Harry Hopkins (disambiguation)
