= William Jones (gangster) =

American criminal and member of the Gas House Gang

- Other names: Willie Jones; Scotty Jones
- Occupation: Criminal
- Years active: fl. 1911
- Known for: New York criminal and member of the Gas House Gang

William Jones (fl. 1911) was an American criminal and member of the Gas House Gang. He was one of the New York City's more notorious career criminals to be arrested and convicted during the New York Police Department's four-year campaign against Manhattan's street gangs and other underworld figures between 1910 and 1914.

In June 1911, he was tried and convicted for second-degree murder of two fellow Gas Housers during a gunfight at one of their hangouts at a saloon between Twenty-Second Street and Third Avenue. He had arrived at Pickett's saloon bringing a young woman with him, this having been generally prohibited in case of members being identified, and was quickly confronted by fellow members William Lysaght, John Tivnan and John Stephenson. He denied having a weapon when asked, the three men not finding one on him when searched, and began arguing over his violation of the gang's orders. All four went outside when asked by the bartender and, once out of the bar, the three men apparently attacked Jones. Falling to the ground, Jones pulled out a revolver he had concealed under his arm and fired at his attackers. Lysaght was shot and died at the scene while Tivnan was shot in the shoulder. Jones was arrested soon after, Lysaght identifying him as the man who shot before dying of his wounds at a nearby hospital. This was a rare occurrence for a gang member, even underworld rivals, to name the men responsible to authorities. After making his statement, Lysaght reportedly turned to a nurse and said "Just watch that bum suffer. He deserves it."

Jones immediately became one of several gang members and underworld figures to be prosecuted by Frank Moss and Edward R. O'Malley of the District Attorney's office. In the same week Jones was sentenced, high-profile criminals such as Albert Rooney, Biff Ellison, and Johnny Spanish were also on trial. While Jones was awaiting trial at The Tombs, he composed two letters which he sent to another gang member whose name was withheld. The first said simply, "You know I did the shooting. Rosa was there and saw me when the gang beat me up. I am only sorry I did not drop a few more of them."

The second was a love letter apparently written to the unidentified Rosa. It was the last letter that resulted in his conviction, particularly the line "I am getting along fine. There is nothing like a vacation to brace you up." While on the stand, angrily swore that he would kill the man responsible for turning the letters over to the District Attorney's office if he ever got out of prison. Among the witnesses he threatened during the trial, he also called out to John Tivnan when he appeared in court and said "If I had gotten you, I would have been better satisfied." Jones was reprimanded by Judge Warren W. Foster and sentenced to serve between 20 years to life imprisonment.
