= Harry Hopkins (disambiguation) =

Harry Hopkins was an American political adviser.

Harry Hopkins may also refer to:

- Harry Hopkins (engineer) (1912–1986), New Zealand civil engineer and professor
- Harry Hopkins (tank), the tank named for politician
- Commander Harry Hopkins who commissioned HMS Satellite (1806)
- Harry Hopkins (organised criminal), associate of Saffo the Greek

== See also ==
- Henry Hopkins (disambiguation)
- Harold Hopkins (disambiguation)
