= Mersher Miller =

American saloon keeper

- Other names: Mersher the Strong Arm
- Occupation: Saloon keeper
- Known for: Saloon keeper and underworld figure on the Lower East Side at the start of the 20th century; his Norfolk Street beer house was one of Johnny Spanish's most famous robberies.

Mersher Miller, commonly known as Mersher The Strong Arm, (fl. 1900–1912) was an American saloon keeper and underworld figure on Manhattan's Lower East Side at the start of the 20th century. Owner of a popular Norfolk Street beer house, his bar was later the scene of a gun battle when Johnny Spanish attempted to rob the bar and its patrons.

In April 1912, Spanish entered the bar and approached Miller's brother who was acting as bartender for the night. Spanish asked where Miller was, his brother said he had left for the day and Spanish demanded $10 from the till. When Miller's brother refused, Spanish left saying he would return later that night. Believing like most of the city that Spanish had fled New York and was in hiding from the police and Kid Dropper, Miller's brother was unaware of his identity and was informed by a patron who suggested he arm himself before the gangster's return. Indeed, as promised, Spanish returned with another man and proceeded to shoot up the place, shattering a large mirror over the bar and robbing the till as well as the remaining customers. Not only did Spanish receive the $10 he originally demanded but took the rest of the night's taking as well amounting to $80. He then turned to Mersher's brother supposedly saying: "Now I might as well cook you. I've no use for barkeeps anyway, 'an besides you're built like a pig and I don't like your looks."

He then began firing, Mersher's brother ducking and dodging as he ran all the way to the end bar, and then Spanish left the bar with his partner. Mersher's brother emerged unscathed from under the bar after Spanish had left, police later finding two bullet holes in the ice box, two through the mirror and five in the top of the bar. This feat greatly enhanced Spanish's reputation in the underworld although he was identified by a bystander and eventually arrested for the robbery.
