= Joseph C. Amberg =

New York mobster

- Born: 1893; Russian Empire
- Died: September 30, 1935 (aged 41–42); Brownsville, Brooklyn, New York City, U.S.
- Burial place: Montefiore Cemetery, Queens, New York City
- Occupation: mobster
- Relatives: Hyman Amberg, Louis "Pretty" Amberg

Joseph Amberg (1892 – September 30, 1935), a.k.a. "Joey", was a Russian-born American New York mobster who, with his brothers Hyman and Louis "Pretty" Amberg, was involved in labor racketeering and other criminal activities. During the 1920s and 1930s the brothers competed with rivals such as Jacob "Gurrah" Shapiro, Louis "Lepke" Buchalter, Abe "Kid Twist" Reles and the Shapiro Brothers. On September 30, 1935, Amberg was murdered alongside associate Morris Kessler. The pair were ambushed in a Brownsville, Brooklyn auto repair garage and, after being ordered to line up against the wall, were gunned down by members of Murder, Inc.

== Criminal career ==
During his life, "Joey" Amberg amassed a lengthy criminal record. On January 11, 1914, Amberg was arrested by Detective Capone in Brownsville, Brooklyn. The police had searched for him in connection with a shooting. On October 7, 1913, Amberg had shot two men, Joseph Schaefer and David Goldstein, both of Brooklyn, New York City. Goldstein had been shot in the hand when he attempted to come to the rescue of Schaefer, who was the first to get shot. It took months for the police to arrest Amberg, but it finally happened on January 11, 1914. The next day, Amberg, who was described as being "dreaded generally throughout Brownsville", was held without bail by Magistrate Steers on two charges of felonious assault. Amberg later pleaded guilty to assault in the first degree and illegally carrying a revolver. On February 9, 1914, County Judge Tiernan sentenced him to eight years imprisonment.
