= Louis Amberg =

American mobster

- Born: Leib Amberg; September 18, 1898; Kishinev, Moldova, Russian Empire
- Died: October 23, 1935 (aged 37); Brooklyn, New York, U.S.
- Cause of death: Homicide
- Body discovered: October 1935
- Occupation: Mobster
- Known for: Victim of an unsolved murder
- Parents: Charles Amberg (father); Rose Amberg (mother)
- Relatives: Joseph Amberg, Hyman Amberg

Louis "Pretty" Amberg (September 18, 1898 – October 23, 1935) was a Jewish American mobster. Along with his brothers Joseph and Hyman Amberg, he competed against Jacob "Gurrah" Shapiro, Louis "Lepke" Buchalter and the Shapiro Brothers for control of Brooklyn's racketeering activities during the 1920s and early 1930s.

== Early life ==
Amberg was born in Kishinev, Moldova, Russian Empire into a Jewish family, the fifth of eight children born to Charles (Zabel)) and Rose (née Rivka Mindelwitz) Amberg. The family immigrated to New York in 1903. In 1910, his father's occupation was listed as a peddler. Louis Amberg was one of five brothers. In addition to Joseph and Hyman, his brother Oscar was tried but acquitted for murder and other crimes. William, who owned a furniture store, was the only brother apparently not in the crime business. Their mother changed her name to Rose Mandell because the Amberg name became so notorious.

Amberg had a tendency to stab a fork in the face of anyone who annoyed or offended him. He once stabbed Milton Berle in the face after Berle insulted him from the stage of the Vanity Fair Club.

== Murder ==
Joseph Amberg was murdered on September 30, 1935. Less than a month later, Pretty Amberg's body was found on the back seat of a flaming car early in the morning of October 23 across from 131 North Elliot Place, Brooklyn. He had been stripped of his clothes, a sack placed over his head with his hands tied with wire. A witness who first spotted the flames saw several men running away from the scene.

Amberg's body was claimed by an undertaker and he was buried without any ceremony. An individual named Al Stern or Stein, 21, was considered a suspect in the killing of both Amberg brothers and at least seven others since that August. The deaths of the Amberg brothers were part of a violent gangland murder spree. The day after Pretty Amberg's death, Dutch Schultz and five others were killed in what the media initially speculated could have been retaliation for the deaths of the Amberg brothers.

For the 10 months prior to his death, Pretty Amberg had been staying in a hotel in midtown Manhattan under an assumed name. Police searched the room and discovered more than $1,000 cash (equivalent to $23,000 in 2025), jewelry (including a gold watch with initials not matching Amberg) and extensive records. The records, which appeared to include names, addresses and other data were written in some kind of code.

== Aftermath ==
The case remains officially unsolved, though he was alleged to have been killed by Murder, Inc. When asked if there were any suspects, a police detective reportedly answered, "Yeah, Brooklyn."

== See also ==
- List of unsolved murders (1900–1979)
