= Hyman Amberg =

American mobster

- Born: Herman Amberg; Circa 1902
- Died: November 3, 1926; Tombs Prison, Manhattan, New York City, U.S.
- Burial place: Montefiore Cemetery, Queens, New York, U.S.
- Occupation: Mobster
- Relatives: Joseph Amberg, Louis Amberg

Herman "Hyman" Amberg (c. 1902 – November 3, 1926) was an American mobster in New York who, with his brothers, Joseph and Louis, formed one of the prominent criminal gangs during Prohibition.

== Death ==
Often acting as an enforcer, he was arrested for the murder of a local jeweler in 1926. While awaiting trial in the Tombs, he and another prisoner attempted to escape after acquiring guns on November 3, 1926. However, they made it only as far as the prison wall before being trapped by prison guards. Rather than surrender to prison authorities, Amberg and the other prisoner committed suicide. He is buried in Montefiore Cemetery.
