= Chicago circulation wars =

Violent newspaper competition in 1900s Chicago

The Chicago circulation wars were a period of competition between William Randolph Hearst's Chicago Evening American and both Robert R. McCormick's Chicago Tribune and Victor Lawson's Chicago Daily News in the early 1900s that devolved into violence and resulted in more than 20 deaths.

== Background ==
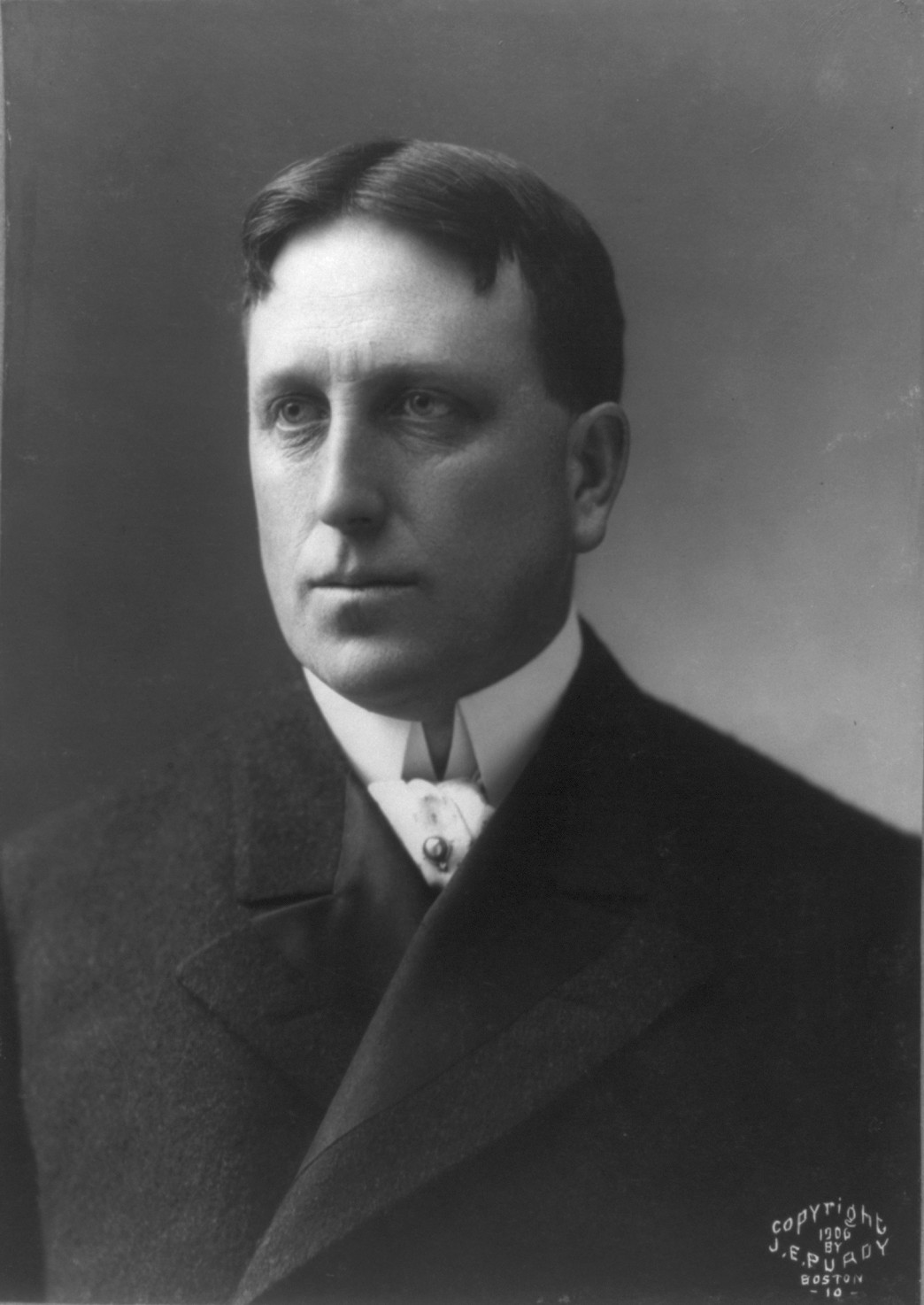
Hearst, 1906

The nine established English-language newspapers in Chicago enjoyed a friendly rivalry, competing for readers and advertisers through sensational headlines, lurid photos, and scoops. Chicago had thousands of privately owned newsstands licensed by the city. Newsstand operators purchased bales of the major newspapers to resell.

In 1900, the National Association of Democratic Clubs had elected Hearst its president, a boost to his ambition to become the president of the United States, with the agreement that Hearst begin a Democratic newspaper in Chicago to compete with the Tribune which was Republican. Hearst, fresh from the circulation war in New York, started the Evening American.

== The wars begin ==
In an attempt to quickly win readers from the other newspapers, Hearst set the price for the American at a penny, half the price of the others. Other newspaper publishers blocked Hearst's evening paper from newsstands and conspired to block businesses from advertising in the American.

Hearst hired Max Annenberg away from McCormick's Tribune to manage circulation for the American. Annenberg recruited fighters, muggers, and bouncers to join his crew. They were armed with blackjacks, brass knuckles, and guns, and instructed to make sure news dealers sold the American. Hearst began publishing a morning version of the American, and hired Moe Annenberg, Max's younger brother, to manage its circulation. Morning American was renamed the Examiner.

The price of the Record-Herald was reduced to a penny to compete with the Examiner. Price wars ensued, with the other papers cutting their price to a penny to compete with Hearst's papers. With all of the papers selling for the same price, violence and intimidation became the preferred methods for achieving dominance at the newsstands.

Annenberg's tactics resulted in daily battles throughout the Chicago Loop. News dealers reduced their orders of other newspapers to make room for the American. Newsboys were threatened into taking delivery of more newspapers than they could sell, and some were taken off the street and beaten. One newsboy was beaten in public until he was unconscious.

The circulation gangs of the American ordered news dealers to hide all rival papers out of sight, using violence to get their way. Streetcar riders reading papers other than the American had the papers ripped from their hands by the gangs. The political might of the newspapers encouraged the police to look the other way.

Annenberg led his thugs in terrorizing shoppers at Marshall Field's until that leading department store took ads in the American. In 1907, the circulation gang for the Evening American hijacked a Tribune delivery truck, tossing all of its newspapers into the Chicago River.

In 1910, both the Tribune and Examiner budgeted approximately one million dollars to finance the circulation wars. The Tribune fought back by hiring both Annenberg brothers away from Hearst. Annenberg was sued by the Examiner and American for breach of contract, but the contract was ruled void because "it was a contract to commit illegal acts". Now working for the Tribune, the Annenberg gang would park near a newsstand. When the Examiner delivery truck arrived, it would be met with gunfire. Hearst recruited a new gang of fighters which would use decoy delivery trucks to counterambush the Annenberg gang. About sixty armed men were involved in one such battle. Multiple fighters, news dealers, and passers-by were shot.

== Public response ==
Despite daily battles in the streets, no newspapers in the city reported on them, bewildering the public. During an earlier Daily News–American phase of the circulation war, the city's Commissioner of Public Works, Joe Patterson, warned the two papers to stop the fighting or lose their sidewalk stands, then sent Department of Public Works wagons to haul newsstands to the city dump, after which the two papers desisted. Only the Chicago Socialist reported the resumption of the circulation war in October, 1910. When the attacks finally began to be mentioned in the newspapers in response to the public questioning the lack of coverage, they were attributed to a fictitious union dispute.

Little action was taken by the police or the prosecuting attorney due to the influence of the newspapers' owners. The Tribune had a hold on the State's Attorney and Hearst controlled the chief of police. Max Annenberg was even deputized by the sheriff.

== Aftermath ==
The start of the World War I brought an end to the circulation wars as the newspapers were able to rely on daily violent headlines to attract readers. The circulation gangs were disbanded. Some of the circulation gang members, such as Mossy Enright and Dean O'Banion, went on to engage in the 1920s bootleg wars, and O'Banion formed the notorious North Side Gang. One compromise resulting from the circulation wars was an agreement that the Tribune be displayed exclusively on the top shelf of newsstands.

The Chicago circulation wars have been described by historians as the industry's most violent period. McCormick testified in 1921 that about 27 men and newsboys had been killed between 1910 and 1912. McCormick would deny any involvement in the violence, but said that Max Annenberg "proved to be much the best circulation manager in town".

On November 4, 1938, Harold L. Ickes entered a statement by Joseph F. Guffey in the Senate record:

The rise of Chicago gangsterism and racketeering may be traced back to the bitter struggle for circulation between certain Chicago newspapers shortly before the World War.

What I am about to tell you is chiefly a matter of course record-- the pleadings of [Moe] Annenberg's own lawyers.

Annenberg assembled a gang of plug-uglies, including Dion O'Bannion [sic], later a Chicago gang leader himself. Annenberg hired out the gang to Hearst to "sell" the Chicago Hearst papers. The "salesmanship consisted of sweeping competing papers off the newsstands and pulling drivers from the seats of circulation trucks. Newsboys were beaten up for refusing to take more papers than they could sell. A trolley car was shot up by these newspaper "salesmen". During this prelude to Capone, several men were killed. The reign of physical terror instituted by these advocates of "freedom of the press" did not end until Chicago was ridden and ruled by racketeers. The hiring of "Moe" Annenberg by Hearst was the beginning of the subsequent flood of lawlessness that almost engulfed law enforcement in the United States.

Bertie McCormick's Chicago Tribune soon got the idea. Bertie is a direct person. He did not bother finding a man who could match Annenberg. He got Annenberg himself. "Moe's" older brother was employed on contract by Hearst as a circulation manager of the Chicago American. For $20,000 a year McCormick induced him to break the contract. The Annenberg brothers and their men began to prey upon Hearst circulation workers as they had earlier preyed upon McCormick's. Hearst sued for violation of his agreement. Hearst lost. Why?

Because the courts held, as Annenberg's lawyers urged, that Hearst's contract with Annenberg was invalid because it was an agreement to commit unlawful acts.

Later "Moe" parted company with his brother and Bertie McCormick. The bloody newspaper circulation war broke out anew in Chicago. Annenberg men were overpowering the Hearst thugs under O'Bannion [sic]. Hearst bought "insurance". He hired "Moe" Annenberg as circulation manager of all the Hearst papers on the theory that his brother would soften his methods. Hearst was right. The brothers kept the peace, relatively speaking. But the evil they had done lived after their "reform". By the time O'Bannion [sic] was shot dead in 1925 [sic] the Chicago gang wars were shocking the world."

== See also ==
- 1910 in organized crime
