= Tenderloin, Manhattan =

Area of New York City during the late 19th and early 20th centuries

Coordinates: 40.749°N 73.988°W

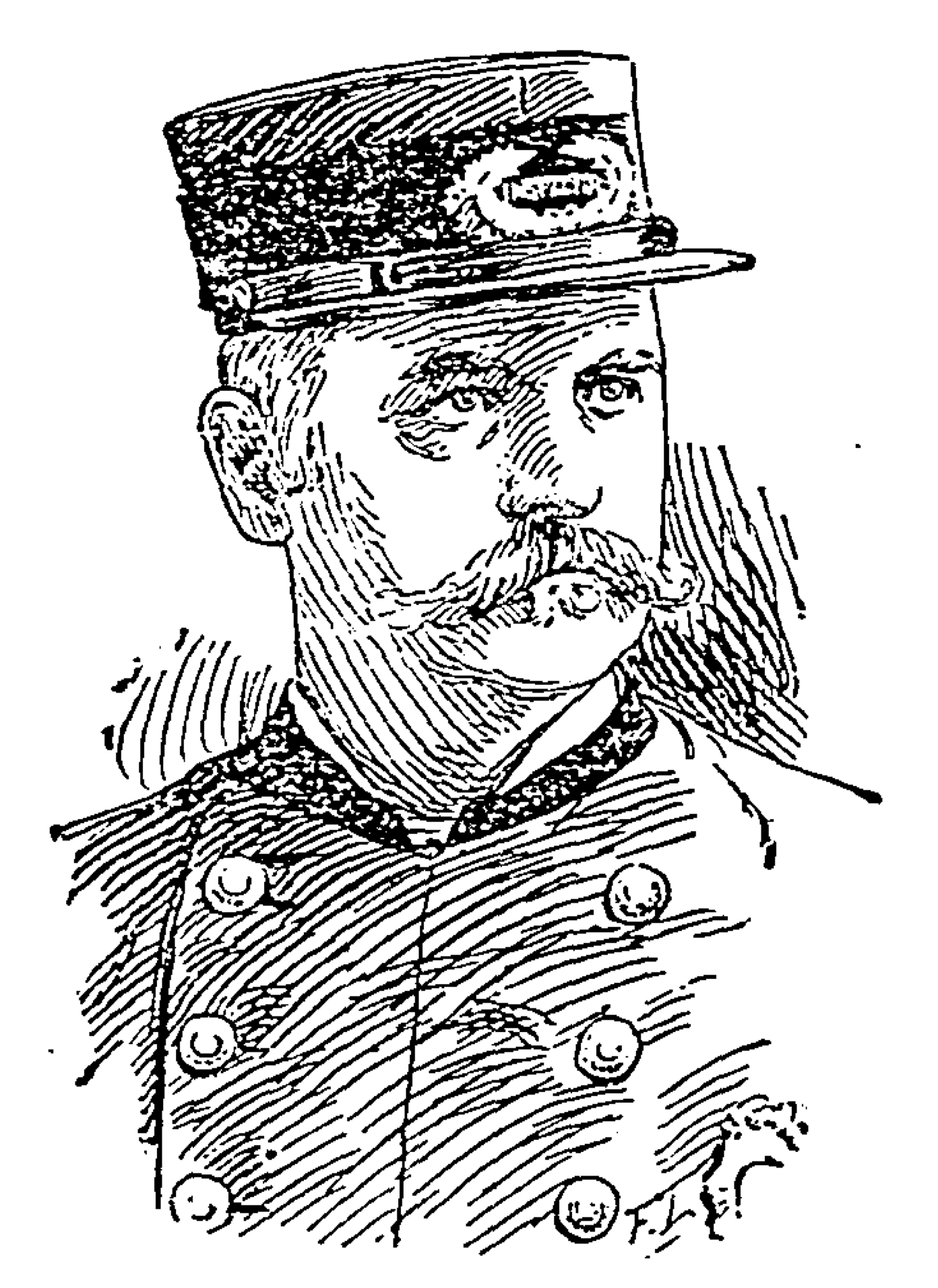
"Clubber" Williams, who coined "the Tenderloin"

The Tenderloin was an entertainment and red-light district in the heart of the New York City borough of Manhattan during the late 19th and early 20th centuries.

The area originally ran from 24th Street to 42nd Street and from Fifth Avenue to Seventh Avenue. By the turn of the 20th century, it had expanded northward to 57th or 62nd Street and west to Eighth Avenue, encompassing parts of what is now NoMad, Chelsea, Hell's Kitchen, the Garment District and the Theater District.

== Etymology ==
New York Police Department Captain Alexander S. "Clubber" Williams gave the area its nickname in 1876, when he was transferred to a police precinct in the heart of this district. Referring to the increased number of bribes he would receive for police protection of both legitimate and illegitimate businesses there – especially the many brothels – Williams said, "I've been having chuck steak ever since I've been on the force, and now I'm going to have a bit of tenderloin."

The name became a generic term for a red-light district in an American city; San Francisco is among the other cities with a well-known "Tenderloin District".

== History ==
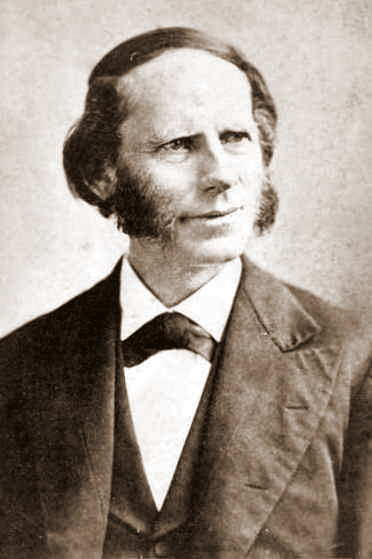
The Rev. Thomas De Witt Talmage called New York City the "modern Gomorrah" for allowing the Tenderloin to exist.

Early in the 19th century, the major vice district had been located in what is now SoHo, called at the time "Hells' Hundred Acres", but as the city grew steadily northward, the theater district along Broadway and the Bowery moved uptown as well, as did the legitimate and illegitimate businesses that were usually connected with show business. For some time, the city's "Rialto" theater district centered on Union Square and 14th Street, but the Fifth Avenue Hotel broke new ground when it opened at 23rd Street and Fifth Avenue in 1859, beginning the expansion of the Union Square Rialto to 23rd Street and Madison Square. By the 1870s, the Fifth Avenue Hotel had many competitors in the area, and where the hotels were, the prostitutes followed.

By the 1880s, the Tenderloin encompassed the largest number of nightclubs, saloons, bordellos, gambling casinos, dance halls, and "clip joints" in New York City, to the extent that one estimate made in 1885 was that half of the buildings in the district were connected with vice. Reformers referred to the area as "Satan's Circus", and one anti-vice crusading minister, the Rev. Thomas De Witt Talmage, denounced the entire city of New York as "the modern Gomorrah" for allowing it to exist.

The clientele of these establishments was not necessarily working-class: one set of seven sisters ran side-by-side brothels in a residential neighborhood on West 25th Street, inviting their upper class customers with engraved invitations. On some nights only gentlemen in formal evening dress were allowed to attend, and the girls of these houses were as socially adept as they were sexually; on Christmas Eve profits were given to charity.

Other well-known venues in the Tenderloin included Koster and Bial's Music Hall at Sixth Avenue and 23rd Street, a concert saloon where inebriated customers could watch the can-can being performed; the Haymarket, a dance hall on Sixth below 30th Street, where rich clients could dance with prostitutes, but not too closely, although they could take them into curtained-off galleries to have discreet sex, and sex exhibitions were on display in the balconies; West 29th Street, which featured an almost uninterrupted row of brothels; and the many gambling dens run by John Daly or the Madison Square Club of Richard A. Canfield on West 26th Street.

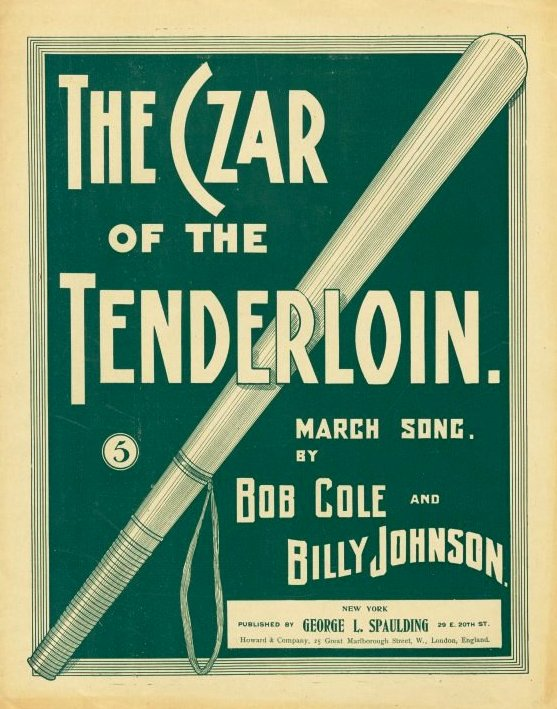
The cover of the sheet music for a popular 1897 song shows a police billy club and uses "Clubber" Williams' nickname: "The Czar of the Tenderloin"

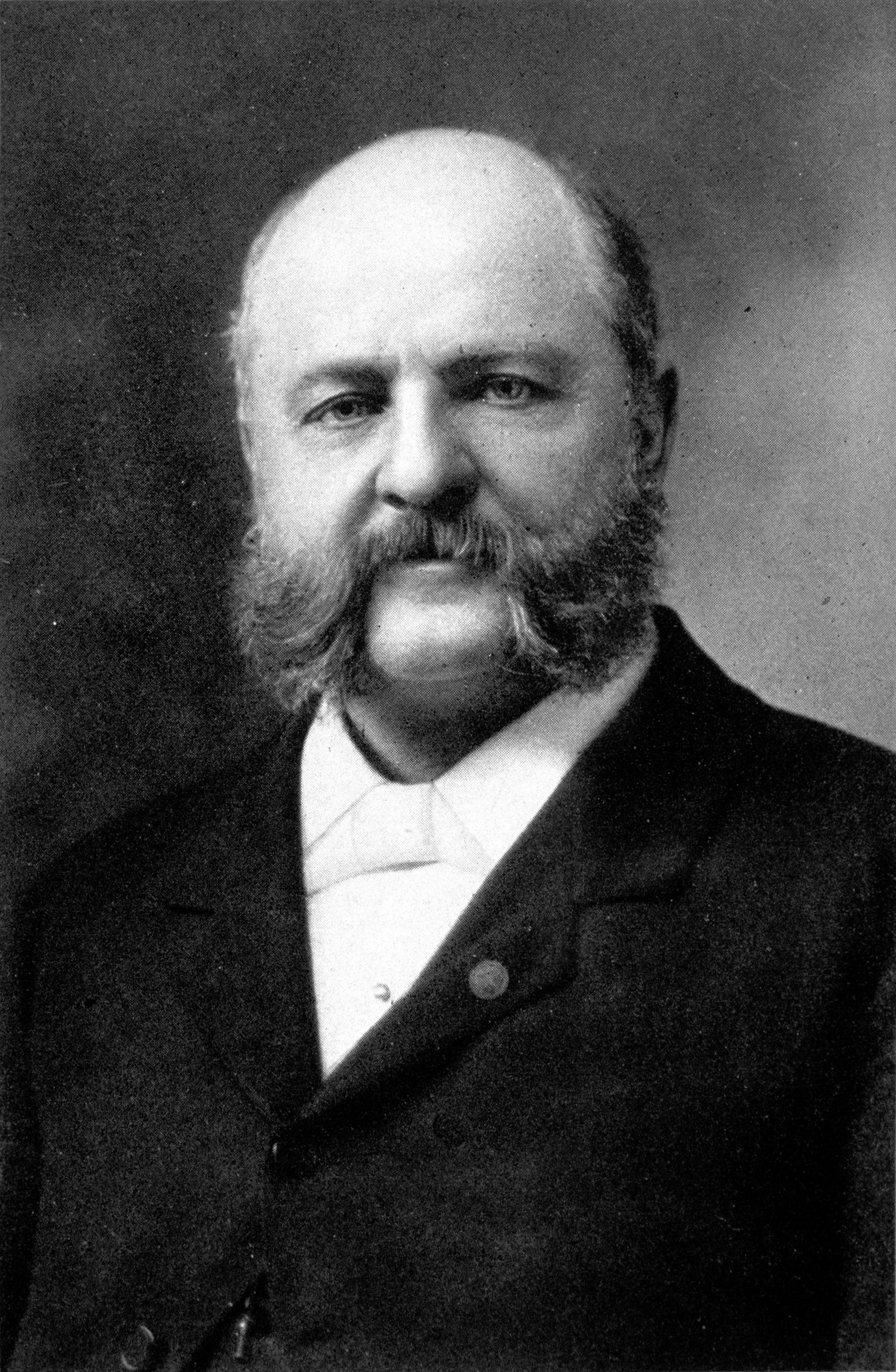
Anthony Comstock, anti-vice crusader

The "Main Street" of the district was Broadway between 23rd and 42nd Streets, which was known as "The Line". In the mid-1890s, after the advent of electric lighting, the stretch of Broadway from 23rd Street to 34th Street came to be called "The Great White Way" because of the numerous illuminated advertising signs there. This moniker was transferred to Times Square when the theater district moved uptown.

Eventually, the processes which created the Tenderloin also served to dismantle it. Once again, theaters and hotels began moving uptown, and the brothels and dance halls and so on followed after them. As early as 1906, McAdoo noted that the northern boundary of the district had moved to 62nd Street, and the "New Tenderloin", as he called it, was now bounded by 42nd Street on the south. The movement, he said, "is rapidly depleting the ranks of the sporting vicious element in the Old Tenderloin".

== Crime ==
Crime was also a major aspect of the Tenderloin, which was considered to be the worst crime-ridden area of what was thought to be the most crime-ridden city of the United States. To a certain extent, police corruption kept crime under control as it regularized the financial relationship between the police and the criminals, but the area was too large, and the pickings too easy, for street crime to be managed completely. In 1906, William McAdoo, who was the city's Police Commissioner in 1904 and 1905, wrote that the "Tenderloin [police] precinct, as every one knows, is the most important precinct in New York, if not in the United States, or probably in the world, from the amount of police business done there and from the character of the neighborhood."

Occasionally there would be organized attempts to clean up the Tenderloin, and reformist mayors, such as William Russell Grace and Abram S. Hewitt, would authorize raids on saloons and brothels, even those under the protection of "Clubber" Williams, but the effects were generally temporary: prostitutes would decamp to outlying areas, and return when the latest crusade was over. The net effect of these "shake-ups" or "shake-downs" was simply to drive up the cost of protection afterwards, making Williams even richer – he retired a millionaire – and putting more money into the pockets of Tammany Hall, which was deeply entwined in the graft and corruption connected with the district.

Frustration at this state of affairs led to Anthony Comstock's anti-vice crusade, which operated with Federal authority from the Post Office and with the support of the New York Chamber of Commerce and leading citizens such as J. P. Morgan. Comstock's crusade knew no boundaries – he was as likely to target "smut" in the public libraries as he was sex-for-hire in the Tenderloin – but along with Rev. Talmage, he was able to get state legislation passed banning pool halls, even though they continued to operate openly.

=== Anti-Black mob and police riot ===
Aside from its commercial activities, the Tenderloin was also the home neighborhood for a large part of Manhattan's African American population, especially in the downtown and western portion of the district: Seventh Avenue within the Tenderloin, in fact, became known as the "African Broadway". This was a neighborhood of Blacks with middle class aspirations.

In August 1900, an undercover police officer, Robert Thorpe, wrongfully attempted to arrest a Black woman, May Enoch, for solicitation while she waited outside of McBride’s saloon for her partner, Arthur Harris. Harris intervened and Thorpe struck him with a club. After Enoch ran away, Harris stabbed Thorpe with a pen knife and ran in another direction. Officer Thorpe died the next day. At Thorpe’s funeral his friends, family, and police coworkers gathered a few blocks away from where he was stabbed, and soon began to riot, violently attacking nearby Black residents and destroying property. Other white people joined in, while the police not involved initially ignored the violence. There were four days of multiple riots through the Tenderloin, lasting roughly from August 14th - 18th. In defense, Black citizens armed themselves and formed the Citizens’ Protective League. Their appeals for justice to Mayor Robert A. Van Wyck went unanswered, and the state and the Police Boards did nothing.

== In popular culture ==
- The Tenderloin of the early 20th century is described from a police perspective in Behind the Green Lights, the memoirs of Police Captain Cornelius Willemse.
- Owen Davis set a series of stories for the Police Gazette in the dance halls and restaurants of the district, and often referred to that section of Broadway running through the district as "The Line". The stories were later collected as Sketches of Gotham (1906) under the pseudonym "Ike Swift". They chronicled the high jinks and low life of the Tenderloin as it was between the 1890s and World War I in a lively and memorable manner. Swift described the district so:

It may be that you -whoever you are or wherever you are- don’t know what it means to go “down the line”. But in New York -in order that we may start right- “The Line” means that part of Broadway where at night the lights burn brightest, and where the mob -swell and otherwise- move back and forth like the ebb and flow of the tide - hunting, hunting, ever on the hunt.

From Twenty-third street to Forty-second, and back again, and you have gone down The Line. Sometimes it costs you nothing for this innocent little amusement; this feast of the eyes; and then again it is liable to cost you a great deal.

It all depends on who you are, and what you are and how easy you are.

And there you are.

- The now-lost film Tenderloin was a crime film taking place in the Tenderloin district.
- The brothels of the Tenderloin, repeatedly raided by Anthony Comstock's vice squad, were the setting for the 1960 musical Tenderloin by Sheldon Harnick and Jerry Bock, based on a novel by Samuel Hopkins Adams
- The Tenderloin, at the turn of the 20th century, is the setting for one of author Victoria Thompson's Gaslight Mysteries, Murder on Sisters' Row.
- The Cinemax television series The Knick featured the 1900 race riot in the season one episode "Get the Rope".
- The Ubisoft game The Division features an area on the map labeled Tenderloin.
- The TNT series The Alienist centres on crimes committed in or linked to The Tenderloin. The series is based loosely on characters created by Caleb Carr in the novel of the same title.

== See also ==
- John W. Goff
- Lexow Committee
- Charles Henry Parkhurst
- Tammany Hall
- Tenderloin, San Francisco
- Red-light district
- Pennsylvania Station (1910–1963), razed 2 full blocks to construct, from Seventh Avenue to Eighth Avenue and 31st to 33rd Streets.
