= Jimmy Cariggio =

Jimmy Curley
- Born: James Cariggio; 1892
- Died: March 3, 1914 (aged 22); Manhattan, New York
- Cause of death: Murdered
- Other names: Jimmy Cariggio; Gold Mine Jimmy
- Occupation: Criminal
- Known for: New York gang leader

James Cariggio (1892 – March 3, 1914), known as both Gold Mine Jimmy and Jimmy Curley, was an American criminal and gang leader. The founder of the Jimmy Curley Gang, his gang was responsible for numerous hold ups and robberies in Manhattan at the start of the 20th century. He had been arrested several times in connection with the gang's activities, he himself was never identified in court. Longtime rivals of the Gas House Gang, Cariggio shot and killed their leader Tommy Lynch in a gunfight in early-1914.

On March 3, Cariggio left his mother's home on Second Avenue. He was found shot to death outside a bookstore on East Thirteenth Street around 7:30 that evening. Although no eyewitnesses were found, nearby residents reported hearing four gunshots. Reverend Frances Edwards of Grace Chapel was having his supper in the rectory when he heard the disturbance and telephoned police. John Morelli, the bookstore owner, and three other men were attending to Cariggo when police arrived minutes later. Questioned by Lieutenant Hennessy and detectives Bonano and Grotano, the men said they hid in doorways when the shooting started and did not see anything.

Nine members of Cariggio's gang were taken to the Fifth Street police station for questioning. Papers discovered in Cariggio's pockets were suspected to have been possible clues to his murder, but the case remained unsolved.
