= Benjamin Snyder =

American for-hire criminal

- Occupation: Criminal
- Employer: Joseph Rosenzweig
- Known for: murderer of labor racketeer Philip "Pinchy" Paul; later became a state witness who revealed the first existence of labor racketeering in New York.

Benjamin "Benny" Snyder or Schneider (fl. 1900 – 1915) was an American criminal, union organizer and thug for hire during the turn of the century. A veteran gunman for New York labor racketeer Joseph "Joe the Greaser" Rosenzweig, his murder of Rosenzweig's rival Philip "Pinchy" Paul ended the first of the so-called "Labor Slugger Wars", which would continue on and off for well over a decade.

Snyder's eventual arrest for Paul's murder would result in his turning state's evidence and revealing to police the existence of "labor sluggers" used by businesses and unions alike during the early 1900s. His testimony would lead not only to the conviction Rosenzweig but of virtually every major labor racketeer in Manhattan's Lower East Side and eliminated "labor slugging" in the city for over two years.

This was one of the first instances of a criminal figure providing information on organized crime during the early 20th century. Similar cases would include Abe "Kid Twist" Reles, a former hitman for Murder, Inc., whose testimony resulted in the conviction (and later execution) of Louis Buchalter in 1941, and Genovese crime family mobster Joe Valachi, who appeared before the McClelland Committee in 1963 to expose the modern-day Cosa Nostra.

== Biography ==
=== Early career ===
A well-known "starker" or strong arm man, Snyder was employed by labor racketeer Joseph "Joe the Greaser" Rosenzweig who controlled what was then known as "labor slugging" with Benjamin "Dopey Benny" Fein prior to the Labor Slugger War. Snyder recalled being recruited as a union organizer for the "Bakers' Union",

I was always a fellow that had been knocking around. So a lot of them bakers got a liking to me, and one time they were supposed to take a shop from the bakers, so they took me along.... When I got down there they said they had some work for me.... So they got a liking to me when they seen that I was good for it; that I stick. So everyone got me.

Snyder was hired out to various racketeers over the next decade. He later claimed that he received $10 for every man he hired to assault strikebreakers, paying each man $7.50 and pocketing the rest for himself. By early 1914, he had become Rosenzweig's main "starker" for the "Furriers' Union". He later committed a serious assault for Rosenzweig, knifing a man by the name of Jewbach at Rivington and Norfolk Street, slashing him twice before being arrested. According to one account, Rosenzweig and half a dozen henchmen found Jewbach before the trial and had his men hold him down while the gang leader cut out a large piece of his lower lip. When the victim failed to appear at the Essex Market Court, Snyder was acquitted.

=== Murder of Pinchy Paul ===
In May 1914, he was called by Rosenzweig to kill a rival labor racketeer and one of his former associates Philip "Pinchy" Paul. Paul had recently been opposing Rosenzweig and threatened to unite various independent sluggers in an effort to break the Rosenzweig–Fein monopoly. Snyder, who apparently blamed Paul for taking his job as a "starker" at the Bakers' Union, agreed to kill Paul for the sum of $5 and immediately carried out the order gunning down Paul on Norfolk Street. Committed in full view of half a dozen witnesses, Snyder was quickly arrested for the shooting. He pleaded guilty to first degree murder and was sentenced to life imprisonment. He continued to be on Rosenzweig's payroll while a convict and, in a visit from Rosenzweig, he was paid the $5 he was owed. Although authorities believed that he had been hired to kill Paul, Snyder maintained that he had acted alone. Held at The Tombs for several months, Snyder eventually agreed to talk to the District Attorney's office.

At a meeting with Assistant District Attorney Royal H. Weller, which was arranged by reform lawyer William Travers Jerome, Snyder made a full and remarkably detailed confession of both his criminal career and outlined labor racketeering activities in a series of conferences taking place during late 1914. Snyder described these activities in a crude but straightforward manner of "beating up scabs" which included, but not limited to, knifing or "bumping him over the head with a pipe". He reportedly even handed the $5 bill he received from Rosenzweig as further proof of his claims.

Not long after, Rosenzweig was arrested with his lieutenants "Little Hymie" Bernstein and "Tough Jake" Heiseman for the murder of Philip Paul. Like Snyder, both Bernstein and Heaiseman agreed to testify against their former boss. As a result of his cooperation, Snyder's sentence was reduced to second degree manslaughter for which he would serve twenty years. District Attorney Charles A. Perkins preferred this rather than putting Snyder on the stand as his only witness. Rosenzweig pleaded guilty to manslaughter and was sentenced to ten years imprisonment. Rosenzweig's conviction would lead to a number of other labor racketeers being imprisoned, most notably Rosenzweig's partner and sometimes rival Benjamin Fein, and temporarily bringing the practice of "labor slugging" to halt.

=== Prison assault ===
On the morning of June 24, 1915, Snyder was attacked by three convicts from Italian Harlem while prison guards were serving breakfast. When the guards momentarily unlocked the cell in order to serve breakfast, the inmates in the adjoining cell entered Snyder's cell and attacked him using the heavy serving bowls. Snyder's attackers, according to prison guards, called him a "rat", "squealer" and "District Attorney's friend" during the assault. By the time the guards managed to stop the attack, Snyder was unconscious and had suffered serious injuries. The prison doctor later stated that had the guards arrived a minute later, Snyder may not have survived.

The three men, all of whom imprisoned on murder charges, were immediately tried and convicted of first degree assault. Frank Maestry had previously been found guilty of manslaughter for the murder of his brother-in-law while the other two, Joseph Bianco and Frank Faroli, were awaiting trial for the murder of Luigi Cardenzo. An investigation held by Weller and Chief Clerk Lucian S. Breckinridge resulted in their clearing Rosenzweig, then a convict at Sing Sing, of any involvement. Instead, they believed that an unknown individual suspected that Snyder was supplying Weller with information gathered from conversations with other convicts.

On the day of the assault, Snyder had been scheduled to appear before the Criminal Term of the Supreme Court for sentencing of the plea of manslaughter for the murder of Paul Philip. He remained in serious condition for several weeks before being transferred to the West 44th Street Prison.
