= Jacob Siegel =

American underworld figure

Kid Jigger
- Born: Jacob Siegel
- Other names: Jigger
- Occupation: Professional gambler
- Known for: Underworld figure who controlled a small gambling empire in East Manhattan during the early 20th century; witness against Johnny Spanish in his 1910 murder case.

Jacob Siegel (fl. 1900-1910), also known as Kid Jigger or simply Jigger, was an American gunman-turned-gambler who operated one of the most successful stuss parlors in Manhattan's East Side during the early 20th century. He was one of the few gamblers not under the control of the many street gangs active in the city, supposedly due to his reputation, and generally ran his operations free of interference from more powerful underworld figures.

In May 1910, he was confronted by Johnny Spanish who attempted to intimidate Siegel into making him a partner. When Siegel refused, Spanish said that he would return the following night to "bump youse off tomorrow night". Indeed the following night Spanish returned with his partner Hyman Benjamin and confronted Siegel as he was leaving his Forsyth Street headquarters, between Hester and Grand Street, and called on him to fight. Spanish then pulled out his revolver and shot at Siegel, who ran off retreating into his stuss house, which instead hit 8-year-old Rachel Rooten which was playing across the street. Siegel later served as the principal witness against Johnny Spanish and Hyman Benjamin, although Spanish later fled the city.

Siegel appeared as a minor character in the 2003 historical novel And All the Saints by Michael Walsh.
