= Henry Hopkins =

Henry Hopkins may refer to:

- Henry Hopkins (pastor) (1837–1908), American pastor & educator, president of Williams College
- Henry Hopkins (curator) (1928–2009), American museum director, art curator and educator
- Henry L. Hopkins (1805–1872), Virginia politician
- Henry Powell Hopkins (1891–1984), American architect

== See also ==
- Henry Hopkins Sibley (1816–1886), American general
- Harry Hopkins (disambiguation)
