= Frank Salvatore =

Frank "Mike the Dago" Salvatore was an Italian-American bootblack and later New York politician who eventually succeeded Chuck Connors as a major figure in Tammany Hall.

== Biography ==
During the 1900s, as Connors began retreating into seclusion due to poor health, Salvatore quickly took advantage by forming the Young Chuck Connors Association which began directly competing against Chuck Connors organization. Salvatore continued to gain political influence from Tammany Hall and, after announcing he and the Young Chuck Connors Association intended to hold a grand ball in opposition of Chuck Connors' annual gala, he eventually succeeded in forcing Connors to compromise in which his name would appear on the programme of the Young Chuck Connors Association as a patron in between then World Heavyweight Boxing Champion Jim Jefferies and retired heavyweight champion Jim Corbett. Connors went into semi-retirement soon after, Salvatore would gradually take over Connors' ward controlling it entirely by the time of Connors' death in 1913.
