= 1999 North Devon District Council election =

1999 UK local government election

The 1999 North Devon District Council election took place on 6 May 1999 to elect members of North Devon District Council in Devon, England. The whole council was up for election and the Liberal Democrats stayed in overall control.

== Election result ==
Overall turnout in the election was 37.77%.

North Devon local election result 1999
Party	Seats	Gains	Losses	Net gain/loss	Seats %	Votes %	Votes	+/−
Liberal Democrats	26			-5	59.1	47.7	17,833	
Independent	13			+3	29.5	22.6	8,447	
Conservative	5			+4	11.4	23.9	8,928	
Labour	0			0	0	5.8	2,165	
Others	0			-2	0	0	0	

2 independent and 1 Liberal Democrat candidates were unopposed.

== Ward results ==
Barnstaple (St. Mary's) (2)
Party	Candidate	Votes	%	±%
Liberal Democrats	Faye Webber	527		
Liberal Democrats	James Burn	432		
Conservative	Susan McCrum	200		
Labour	Heather Hannant	100		
Turnout		1,259	31.1	

Bishop's Nympton
Party	Candidate	Votes	%	±%
Independent	Eric Ley	679	74.6	
Liberal Democrats	Christopher Dale	231	25.4	
Majority		448	49.2	
Turnout		910	60.7	

Bishop's Tawton & Atherington
Party	Candidate	Votes	%	±%
Independent	Walter White	unopposed		

Bratton Fleming
Party	Candidate	Votes	%	±%
Liberal Democrats	Malcolm Prowse	451	52.7	
Conservative	David Lilley	381	44.5	
Labour	Lino Menezes Da Cunha Rebelo	24	2.8	
Majority		70	8.2	
Turnout		856	58.6	

Braunton East (2)
Party	Candidate	Votes	%	±%
Liberal Democrats	Derrick Spear	673		
Liberal Democrats	Elizabeth Spear	604		
Conservative	Andrew Day	290		
Labour	Charles Piper	260		
Labour	Colin Kingston	193		
Turnout		2,020	36.5	

Braunton West (2)
Party	Candidate	Votes	%	±%
Liberal Democrats	Marguerite Shapland	648		
Liberal Democrats	Desmond Paul	623		
Conservative	Caroline Chugg	615		
Conservative	Jasmine Chesters	531		
Turnout		2,417	42.3	

Chittlehampton
Party	Candidate	Votes	%	±%
Independent	Albert Cook	514	81.6	
Conservative	Jeremy Yabsley	116	18.4	
Majority		398	63.2	
Turnout		630	43.6	

Chumleigh
Party	Candidate	Votes	%	±%
Conservative	Terence Pincombe	407	43.2	
Independent	Stephen Mercer	287	30.5	
Liberal Democrats	Christine Preece	248	26.3	
Majority		120	12.7	
Turnout		942	57.6	

Combe Martin (2)
Party	Candidate	Votes	%	±%
Liberal Democrats	Yvette Gubb	914		
Liberal Democrats	Peter Spencer	611		
Conservative	Graeme Coombs	586		
Labour	Helen Hoyles	130		
Labour	Alan Smith	103		
Turnout		2,344	49.7	

Fremington (3)
Party	Candidate	Votes	%	±%
Independent	Roy Morrish	1,122		
Conservative	Rodney Cann	944		
Liberal Democrats	Carol McCormack-Hole	915		
Leading Environmentalist	Joanne Bell	871		
Conservative	Rosaleen Day	787		
Liberal Democrats	Robert Jones	662		
Liberal Democrats	Ronald Ellerton	660		
Labour	Michael Watson	475		
Turnout		6,436	35.5	

Georgeham
Party	Candidate	Votes	%	±%
Liberal Democrats	Frank Purcell	unopposed		

Heanton Punchardon
Party	Candidate	Votes	%	±%
Liberal Democrats	Brian Jewell	354	74.5	
Conservative	Michael Friend	121	25.5	
Majority		233	49.1	
Turnout		475	31.4	

Ilfracombe Central (2)
Party	Candidate	Votes	%	±%
Independent	Richard Campbell	359		
Independent	Ivan Frances	232		
Independent	William Hedges	230		
Liberal Democrats	Shirley Vidler	211		
Liberal Democrats	Christine Holloway	176		
Labour	David Williams	150		
Labour	Antony Cooper	135		
Turnout		1,493	29.0	

Ilfracombe East (2)
Party	Candidate	Votes	%	±%
Independent	Albert Furber	285		
Conservative	Carol Slinn	274		
Liberal Democrats	Michael Edmunds	273		
Independent	Michael Dymond	225		
Liberal Democrats	June Williams	192		
Hotelier (Retired)	Gwendoline Cross	179		
Independent	William Dixon	94		
Labour	Maureen Smiles	78		
Labour	Thomas Smiles	49		
Turnout		1,649	39.2	

Ilfracombe West (2)
Party	Candidate	Votes	%	±%
Liberal Democrats	Geoffrey Fowler	415		
Independent	David Spear	401		
Liberal Democrats	Adrian Perry	313		
Conservative	Franklin Pearson	244		
Labour	Brian Cotton	218		
Labour	Keith Thompson	185		
Turnout		1,776	31.2	

Instow
Party	Candidate	Votes	%	±%
Conservative	Lynn Brown	335	51.9	
Liberal Democrats	Reginald Cane	310	48.1	
Majority		25	3.9	
Turnout		645	47.6	

Landkey
Party	Candidate	Votes	%	±%
Liberal Democrats	David Butt	502	75.6	
Conservative	Mark Slater	162	24.4	
Majority		340	51.2	
Turnout		664	30.1	

Longbridge
Party	Candidate	Votes	%	±%
Liberal Democrats	John Wilsher	211	60.1	
Conservative	Henry Harrison	140	39.9	
Majority		71	20.2	
Turnout		351	28.0	

Lynton & Lynmouth
Party	Candidate	Votes	%	±%
Independent	Edward Nightingale	unopposed		

Marwood
Party	Candidate	Votes	%	±%
Liberal Democrats	Harold Hopkins	350	53.0	
Conservative	Andrea Harper-Davis	310	47.0	
Majority		40	6.1	
Turnout		660	47.6	

Mortehoe
Party	Candidate	Votes	%	±%
Liberal Democrats	Malcolm Wilkinson	454	87.5	
Labour	Eugene Clarke	65	12.5	
Majority		389	75.0	
Turnout		519	29.9	

Newport (2)
Party	Candidate	Votes	%	±%
Liberal Democrats	Brian Macbeth	506		
Liberal Democrats	Diana Piercy	484		
Conservative	Mark Parkhouse	305		
Conservative	Ross Cowan	258		
Turnout		1,553	26.5	

North Molton
Party	Candidate	Votes	%	±%
Independent	Herbert Geen	319	50.4	
Liberal Democrats	Michael Nelson	314	49.6	
Majority		5	0.8	
Turnout		633	56.1	

Pilton (2)
Party	Candidate	Votes	%	±%
Liberal Democrats	Brian Greenslade	698		
Liberal Democrats	Mair Manuel	594		
Conservative	Fredrick Bastable	277		
Conservative	David Hartnoll	213		
Turnout		1,782	28.5	

South Molon (2)
Party	Candidate	Votes	%	±%
Independent	John Moore	959		
Independent	Susan Sewell	823		
Conservative	Peter Wilson	314		
Liberal Democrats	Allan Petchey	279		
Liberal Democrats	Vernon Wood	228		
Turnout		2,603	42.0	

Swimbridge
Party	Candidate	Votes	%	±%
Liberal Democrats	Alan Rennles	337	50.7	
Conservative	John Singh	328	49.3	
Majority		9	1.4	
Turnout		665	42.4	

Tawstock
Party	Candidate	Votes	%	±%
Independent	Pamela Holland	599	68.0	
Liberal Democrats	Patricia Ford	282	32.0	
Majority		317	36.0	
Turnout		881	49.3	

Trinity (2)
Party	Candidate	Votes	%	±%
Liberal Democrats	Francis Ovey	412	43.0	
Liberal Democrats	Valerie Monk	362	37.7	
Conservative	Simon Harvey	185	19.3	
Turnout		959	18.0	

Witheridge
Party	Candidate	Votes	%	±%
Conservative	Timothy Bonner	489	54.0	
Liberal Democrats	Thelma Avery	416	46.0	
Majority		73	8.1	
Turnout		905	58.5	

Yeo (2)
Party	Candidate	Votes	%	±%
Liberal Democrats	Janet Deverell	483		
Liberal Democrats	Colin Payne	478		
Independent	Alfred Dibble	269		
Conservative	Paul Dyer	116		
Turnout		1,346	32.5	
