= Rosario Borgio =

Italian mobster in Akron, Ohio

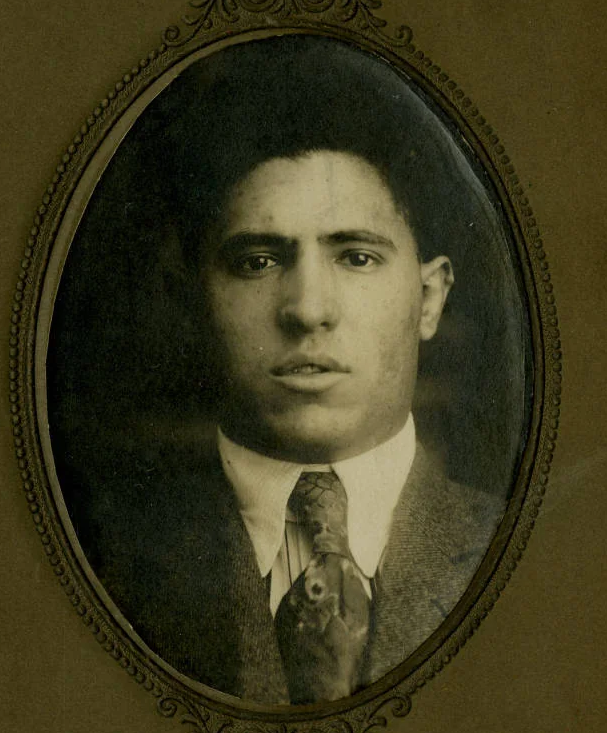
- Born: 1894; Sant'Agata del Bianco, Calabria, Italy
- Died: February 21, 1919 (aged 24); Ohio State Penitentiary, Ohio, U.S.
- Other names: Russell Berg, Russell Burch, Mike Burga, Joe Filastocco, Joe Philostopo, Pippino Napolitano, Joe Neapolitan, Rosario Borge, Rosario Borgi, and Rosario Borgia
- Years active: 1910s–1919
- Organization: Black Hand
- Known for: 1917–1919 Akron police murders
- Status: Executed by electrocution
- Conviction: First degree murder
- Penalty: Death

Details
- Targets: Italians, policemen

Rosario Borgio (1894 – February 21, 1919) was an early Italian mobster establishing one of the first organized crime operations in the Midwestern United States during the early 20th century. In 1917, as the leader of Akron's Black Hand, he offered gang members $250 for each police officer they killed. He died by electric chair in 1919. Borgio's many aliases included: Russell Berg, Russell Burch, Mike Burga, Joe Filastocco, Joe Philostopo, Pippino Napolitano, Joe Neapolitan, Rosario Borge, Rosario Borgi, and Rosario Borgia.

== Biography ==
Borgio was born in 1893 in Sant'Agata del Bianco, Calabria, Italy, perhaps to Giovanni and Maria Borgi. He took up crime as a child and by his early teens was "a hardened criminal." Borgio briefly worked as a professional wrestler and a barber and had at least one sibling, Salvatore. Borgio immigrated to the United States in 1910 and moved to Akron shortly after, where he married Filomena Matteo, also an Italian immigrant. The couple opened a brothel under the guise of a "soft-drink establishment" from their home on North Howard. Police raided the business in February 1916 and arrested the couple and two of its "waitresses," but all four were released on a $100 bail. Borgio moved the brothel across town after the arrest. He filed for divorce against his wife on grounds of adultery but it was withdrawn shortly after. Around this time, Borgio was also arrested for illegal concealed carry by Officer Edward Costigan.

Along with the brothel, Rosario operated a successful general store, which he used as a front for the criminal options taking place in the two back rooms. He claimed his home was "police proof," as the property was guarded by an extensive security system including alarms on both the front and back stairs; pits built into the stairs which held foot-long steel spikes; a solid steel door; and a large arsenal of weapons including shotguns, rifles, pistols, and submachine guns.

Before long, Borgio controlled the Akron arm of Black Hand, a criminal organization aimed primarily at Midwestern cities with growing Italian communities. He was involved with illegal gambling, bootlegging, blackmail, drug peddling, and prostitution, and was known to gather at a pool hall on Furnace Street with his men. Borgio had extensive political protection, with much of the city's politicians on his payroll; Akron's police force, however, remained considerably immune to his bribery. In early 1917, Akron police began raiding Borgio's gambling dens and brothels, arresting gang members and clientele indiscriminately.

=== Police murders ===
In the fall of 1917, after years of being monitored, patted down, and otherwise harassed, Borgio declared war on the Akron police force, offering a bounty of $250 on all police officers in the city. The first victim was Patrolman Guy Norris, who, while patrolling his beat, witnessed a robbery and was shot twice in the back when he confronted the burglar. He was the first policeman in Akron to die while on duty. On January 10, 1918, patrolmen Edward Costigan and Joe Hunt, also on patrol, were shot and killed. Borgio targeted Costigan specifically because Costigan would stop him in the street and search him for concealed weapons whenever the two would meet following Borgio's concealed carry arrest. A fourth officer, Gethin Richards, was killed on March 12, 1918. He had been following two suspicious men when he was shot multiple times in the stomach. Borgio reportedly held Richards' hands behind his back while Frank Mazzanno shot him. A passerby witnessed the murder and reported it to the police, who apprehended the killers shortly after.

Akron police were initially unaware of Borgio's involvement and considered it might be the work of a murder ring. After Detective Chief Harry Welch was given Tony Manfredi's name as a suspect, and subsequently found medical records detailing a bullet wound in the hand, Detective Chief Eddie McDonnell brought in Lt. Michael Fiaschetti from the NYPD head the mafia unit to consult. Welch sent Fiaschetti information about Manfredi, thought to have fled to New York, and the address of a pool room Manfredi's relative owned. Manfredi and James Palmeri were arrested at the pool room Welch described and were escorted back to Akron by Welch and Fiaschetti. Detectives Welch, McDonnell, and Corey arrested an additional suspect, Pasquale Biondo, in a rooming house in Sandusky, Ohio.

=== Conviction and death ===
Borgio, along with accomplices Frank Chiavaro, Frank Mazzanno, and Pasquale's brother Lorenzo Biondo, were convicted of first degree murder. Borgio, Mazzanno, and Chiavaro were sentenced to death. James Palmeri and Tony Manfredi were sentenced to life terms in prison, while Lorenzo Biondo's sentence was commuted by Gov. George White in 1934, after which he was deported to Italy. Borgio reportedly admitted to other crimes while awaiting death in hopes that it would delay or call off his execution.

Borgio died by electric chair on February 21, 1919, at the Ohio Penitentiary. In the weeks following his death, three more policemen were shot by angry Black Hand members, one of whom, Officer George Werne, died. Three men, one of whom escaped arrest, were accused of involvement in the murder of Werne. The other two stood trial for murder. Vincent Damico was convicted of first degree murder, sentenced to death, and executed in 1920. His accomplice received a life sentence.
