= Jacob Orgen =

American mobster (1893–1927)

Jacob "Little Augie" Orgen
- NYPD mug shot of Jacob Orgen
- Born: Jacob Orgenstein; January 1893; Minsk
- Died: October 16, 1927 (aged 34); Manhattan, New York, U.S.
- Cause of death: Murdered
- Other name: Little Augie
- Occupation: Labor racketeer
- Known for: Vice king, bootlegger, Labor racketeer, Drug trafficker
- Height: 5 ft 2 in (157 cm)
- Predecessor: Nathan Kaplan
- Successor: Louis "Lepke" Buchalter, Jacob "Gurrah" Shapiro
- Children: 1

Jacob "Little Augie" Orgen (January 1893 – October 16, 1927) was a New York gangster involved in bootlegging and labor racketeering during Prohibition.

== Biography ==
Born to a middle-class Orthodox Jewish family from Austria as Jacob Orgenstein, Orgen became a well-known labor slugger for Benjamin "Dopey Benny" Fein by the early 1910s. Being ambitious, he had formed his own gang, "The Little Augies", c. 1911. He operated his labor rackets diligently for the next five or six years until his former boss, Dopey Benny, had faded from prominence. His rising star was soon put on hold, however, when "Kid Dropper" Nathan Kaplan and Johnny Spanish were both released from Sing Sing in 1917. While they worked together at first, they soon resumed their old rivalry and each formed his own separate gang.

Orgen was even further hindered in his rise in 1919 when he was jailed on a robbery charge. Kid Dropper eventually eliminated Spanish that same year and reigned supreme while Orgen was in jail. While Orgen was in prison, his gang barely held together and fought, often unsuccessfully, against Kaplan's gang while waiting patiently for their leader to return to the streets.

Orgen was released and on the streets again in 1923. Quickly becoming a formidable rival again to Kaplan, Orgen gradually built up a powerful organization which included members such as gunmen Louis "Lepke" Buchalter, Jacob "Gurrah" Shapiro, and Jack "Legs" Diamond. Orgen, allied with Solomon Schapiro, challenged Kaplan over labor slugging activities, particularly in the garment district. In 1923, a gang war broke out after a dispute over striking "wet wash" laundry workers.

After several months of fighting, including a particularly violent gunfight on Essex Street resulting in the deaths of two bystanders, Kaplan was murdered by gunman Louis Kushner, a man attached to Orgen's organization, on August 28, 1923. With Kaplan's death, Orgen gained complete control over labor racketeering.

By 1925 Orgen, in partnership with Legs Diamond, had started to move into bootlegging, supplying Broadway nightclubs and speakeasies. He also kept up his original core occupation of labor slugging. City officials soon began investigating union racketeering in New York, which threatened to expose other criminal operations. In 1927, through intermediary Louis Buchalter (although some sources claim Meyer Lansky), Orgen was advised by Arnold "The Brain" Rothstein to concentrate on infiltrating labor unions instead of traditional labor slugging and strong-arm tactics.

== Personal life ==
In 1926 Orgen became a father when his wife gave birth to a girl who the couple named Zelda. With his increasing wealth, Orgen moved his family out of the Lower East Side to the more affluent Upper West Side.

Though the labor rackets were originally his main source of income, by the mid 1920s Orgen was expanding his horizons into bootlegging and other rackets.

== Death ==
At 8:30 PM on October 15, 1927, Orgen and Legs Diamond, his business partner and Orgen's substitute bodyguard, were walking down Delancey Street and turning onto Norfolk Street on the Lower East Side, Manhattan, when a car slowly drove up behind them, a gunman jumped out, walked up behind them, and opened fire. Orgen was killed instantly with a shot to the right temple while Diamond was shot twice under the heart. The gunman jumped back into the car which quickly sped off north through Norfolk Street. The shooting was witnessed by many men, women, and children, who ran for cover in tenement hallways when the gunman opened fire. A few minutes later, policemen and detectives under Captain Seary of the Clinton Street precinct arrived to the scene. The wounded Diamond was removed to Bellevue Hospital in what was reported as a "dying" condition. According to some sources, Orgen was 34 years old at the time of his murder, but his tombstone in Mount Judah Cemetery reads simply "Jacob Orgen, Age 26 Years" because his father had disowned him after he formed the "Little Augies" in 1919 at the age of 26.
