= Sam Cardinelli =

American mobster (1869–1921)

Samuele Cardinelli
- Born: April 2, 1882; U.S.
- Died: April 15, 1921 (aged 39)
- Cause of death: Execution by hanging
- Other name: Il Diavolo
- Allegiance: Cardinelli Gang
- Criminal charges: Murder
- Penalty: Death by hanging
- Accomplices: Nicholas "The Choir Boy" Viana; Frank Campione

Details
- Victims: Andrew P. Bowman

Samuele Cardinelli (born Salvatore Cardinella; April 2, 1882 - Apr 15, 1921) was an American mobster, extortionist, and leader of Cardinelli Gang of Chicago during the 1920s.

With lieutenants Nicholas "The Choir Boy" Viana, only age 18, and Frank Campione, Cardinelli led one of the most dominant Black Hand gangs in Chicago prior to Prohibition. Robbing hundreds of hotels, speakeasies, and illegal gambling parlors throughout the decade, the Cardinelli gang terrorized Chicago's Little Italy through a six-year bombing campaign between 1915 and 1918. This murderous campaign resulted in 20 deaths and hundreds wounded (Viana was suspected in at least 15 murders alone). Cardinelli's organization would remain the leading Italian-American criminal organization in the city, including the Johnny Torrio-Al Capone gang, during the early years of Prohibition.

Cardinelli, also known as "Il Diavolo" (The Devil), was arrested by the Chicago police Homicide Squad for the 1919 murder of saloon owner Andrew P. Bowman and sentenced to hang on October 11, 1920. Following a decision by the US Supreme Court on March 4, 1921, supporting the ruling, Cardinelli was executed on Apr 15, 1921.

On the day of his execution, Cardinelli refused to walk to the gallows. He was strapped to a chair, carried to the gallows, and was hanged, chair and all. After the execution, the jail attendants took his body to an ambulance, which had been hired by his family. Inside, a jail attendant noticed a nurse, a doctor, and another man, as well as hot water bottles. The attendant contacted a deputy warden, who delayed the body for an hour. When it was finally released, a guard saw the nurse rub Cardinelli's cheeks and wrists, and the doctor prepare an injection. A police car stopped the ambulance, and the apparent attempt to revive the dead mobster. (The ambulance was found to have a specially heated bed, an oxygen tank, an electric battery and various syringes.)

One newspaper story says that a similar ambulance had waited for Viana, who was executed on December 10, 1920. Viana was taken to a room about two blocks from the jail with where he was successfully revived to test the system before Cardinelli's execution. Viana was then killed because he had snitched against the Cardinella gang.

== In popular culture ==
- The Cardinelli Gang was the subject of author W. R. Burnett's 1929 novel Little Caesar, which was adapted into the famous 1930 film Little Caesar, starring Edward G. Robinson.
- Ernest Hemingway wrote a brief vignette about Cardinelli's execution (spelling the name "Sam Cardinella"), headed "Chapter XV" in the 1924 book of short stories In Our Time. The account acts as an interlude between parts I and II of the story "Big Two-Hearted River."

== General references ==
- Sifakis, Carl. The Mafia Encyclopedia. New York: Da Capo Press, 2005. ISBN 0-8160-5694-3
- Sifakis, Carl. The Encyclopedia of American Crime. New York: Facts on File Inc., 2001. ISBN 0-8160-4040-0
- Asbury, Herbert. The Gangs of Chicago: An Informal History of the Chicago Underworld. New York: Thunder's Mouth Press, 1986. ISBN 1-56025-454-8

McNamara, Drama in the Death House, Cardinella's Weird Plot to Rise from the Dead How 'Devil's' Dupe Served as 'Guinea Pig' in Test, Chicago Daily Tribune, 11/29/36
