= Saffo the Greek =

American mobster

Saffo the Greek was an American racketeer in Chicago's red light district known as "The Levee" prior to Prohibition. However, following the official closing of the area by John E. W. Wayman (Cook County state's attorney) in 1912, he was forced to leave within two years.

In July 1914, he was in attendance with other figures of the Levee including John Torrio (representing Jim Colosimo), John Jordan, Jackie Adler and Harry Hopkins at Port Lamp Burke's roadhouse near Cedar Creek several hours after gunman Roxie Vanella, a cousin of Torrio whom he had brought in from New York, had shot and killed Chicago detective Sgt. Stanley Birns.
