= Albert Facchiano =

American mobster

Albert Joseph Facchiano
- Born: March 10, 1910; U.S.
- Died: August 16, 2011 (aged 101); Florida, U.S.
- Other names: Chinkie, The Old Man
- Allegiance: Genovese crime family
- Criminal charges: Rape (dismissed); Robbery; Receiving stolen goods; Grand larceny; Bookmaking; Racketeering; Money laundering; Bank fraud; Witness tampering; Extortion; Loansharking
- Penalty: 2–5 years (1932); 25 years (1979); 6 months house arrest, 18 months probation (2007)

Albert Joseph Facchiano (March 10, 1910 – August 16, 2011), also known as "Chinkie" and "the Old Man", was a Miami mobster with the New York–based Genovese crime family who was involved in loansharking and extortion in South Florida. Facchiano achieved notoriety for being indicted on mob crimes at age 96.

== Background ==
A longtime underworld figure, Facchiano oversaw armed robberies, money laundering, bank fraud and other criminal activities for the Genovese family for nearly 60 years. Although considered a "low-level figure" by the Federal Bureau of Investigation (FBI), Facchiano has an extensive arrest record.

In 1930, Facchiano was arrested in New York for rape, but the charge was later dismissed. In 1932, Facchiano was convicted in Pittsburgh, Pennsylvania of robbery and receiving stolen goods and was sentenced to two to five years in prison. In 1936, Facchiano was arrested in New York on grand larceny charges, in 1944 for bookmaking charges.

== Federal investigation ==
In 1979, Facchino was convicted in Alabama of federal racketeering charges and sentenced to 25 years in prison. While still in prison, Facchiano became involved in an investigation of Reagan Administration U.S. Secretary of Labor Raymond J. Donovan and his alleged ties to organized crime. Investigators claimed that in January 1979 Facchiano and Genovese mobster William Maselli had met with Donovan. The subject of this meeting was setting up so-called "no show" jobs for Genovese mobsters at Schiavoni Construction, Donovan's company, at sites near Miami, Florida. Donovan denied that the meeting took place and claimed his innocence. In 1982, Facchiano reportedly testified to a New York grand jury on the Donovan case. In 1987, Donovan was tried and acquitted of larceny charges.

== Later life ==
In the Fall of 1987, Facchiano was released from prison. In 2001, in a conversation recorded by the FBI while Facchiano was dining with other Genovese mobsters, he offered to do a killing if the family needed it. Mobster Joseph Zito said that Facchiano should retire and leave murders to the younger guys. Facchiano, who was 91 at the time, allegedly responded 'that you’re never retired', and then reiterated his willingness to 'kill for the family'.

In 2006, Facchiano was indicted in Ft. Lauderdale, Florida, on charges of supervising mob associates engaged in crimes such as robbery, money laundering and bank fraud from 1994 to 2006. That same year, Facchiano was indicted in New York for attempting to intimidate or kill a mob witness in Florida in 2005.

In February 2007, Facchiano pleaded guilty to witness tampering and racketeering charges from both indictments. On June 4, 2007, Facchiano, 97 years old at the time, was sentenced to six months of house arrest and 18 months of probation. He avoided jail time due to his advanced age and poor health. At the sentencing, Facchiano told the judge that he was “sorry” for his crimes. He also said that he “would never get mixed up anymore” and his “days in organized crime are over”.

On August 16, 2011, Facchiano died in Florida of natural causes.
