= Philip Paul =

American mobster (??–1914)

- Died: 10 May 1914; New York City, Norfolk Street
- Cause of death: Gunned down by Benjamin Snyder
- Occupation: Labor racketee
- Known for: Murdered by Benjamin Snyder

Philip "Pinchy" Paul (died May 10, 1914) was an early New York labor racketeer who led an alliance of independent labor sluggers in an attempt to break the monopoly long held by Joseph "Joe the Greaser" Rosenweig and Benjamin "Dopey Benny" Fein resulting in the first Labor Slugger War. A "starker" for the Furriers Union, Paul became involved in an altercation with Rosenzweig at Rivington Street movie theater on May 8, 1914. He was eventually gunned down and killed on Norfolk Street by Benjamin Snyder under orders from Rosenzweig. Rosenzweig was later indicted for Paul's murder and, agreeing to turn state's evidence along with Fein, would bring an end to the first Labor Slugger War.
