= Nathan Kaplan =

American mobster

Kid Dropper
- Born: Nathan Caplin; August 3, 1891; Lower East Side, New York, United States
- Died: August 28, 1923 (aged 32); Manhattan, New York, United States
- Cause of death: Murdered
- Resting place: Mount Hebron Cemetery
- Other names: Kaitlin Kaplan, Nathan Caplan, Jack the Dropper
- Occupation: Labor racketeer
- Known for: Gang leader and underworld figure who controlled "labor slugging" in New York from 1919 to 1923.

"Kid Dropper" Nathan Caplin or Kaplan (August 3, 1891 – August 28, 1923), also known as Jack the Dropper, was an American gangster who controlled labor racketeering and extortion in New York City during the post-World War I period into the early years of Prohibition in the early 1920s.

== Biography ==
Nathan Caplin was one of seven sons of Joseph Caplin. He was born in New York's Lower East Side on August 3, 1891. His parents were Jewish immigrants from the Russian Empire. Later Caplin would modify his surname to Kaplan to shield his own family and confuse police. His mother died when he was still young. Kaplan began committing petty thefts at an early age and later becoming a skilled sneak thief and pushcart extortionist, later becoming known for his skill with the "drop swindle". That's how he got his nickname "Kid Dropper." He was arrested for the first time at age 17 in February 1908 on a charge of theft and was handed a suspended sentence. A year later, another judge again gave Kaplan a suspended sentence for concealing a weapon. Like many other criminals of this era, the Dropper at an early stage joined a street gang. In his case it was the powerful Five Points Gang led by Paul Kelly. This was in contrast to many of his fellow Jewish East Siders who predominantly joined the Five Points Gang's rival Eastman Gang led by its namesake Monk Eastman. The Five Points Gang had mostly Italian members, but there were also some Irish and Jewish members.

One member of the Five Points Gang that the Dropper would feud heavily with in the coming years was Johnny Spanish. Spanish and Kaplan started out as friends and criminal partners. By the late 1900s or early 1910s, both the Dropper and Spanish had formed their own small gangs. The two gangs were allied for a while before a bitter personal rivalry developed between the Dropper and Johnny Spanish. The two had a fall out over a woman, 19-year-old Beatrice Konsant. The feud with Johnny Spanish lasted until the Dropper's arrest the following year for robbery for which he was sentenced to seven years in Sing Sing prison.

Upon his release in 1918, Kaplan became involved in "labor slugging", providing muscle to either side in the strikes common in New York in that era. Kaplan quickly filled the void left by "Dopey" Benny Fein and Joe "The Greaser" Rosenzweig in the aftermath of the internecine battles between those gangsters. He organized former Five Points members, including Johnny Spanish. Another Jewish labor slugging gang led by Jacob "Little Augie" Orgen, rose steadily behind his.

Kaplan and Spanish, who had previously reconciled from an argument over a woman from their days in the Five Points Gang, soon began feuding again and eventually Spanish split from Kaplan's gang, forming his own separate gang. A violent war between the two soon began; fighting, particularly in the garment district, continued until Johnny Spanish was killed while leaving a Manhattan restaurant by three men, most likely including Kaplan, on July 29, 1919. Soon thereafter, Little Augie went to prison and his gang nearly dissolved, leaderless. After Spanish's death and Orgen's incarceration, Kaplan controlled all of labor slugging operations in New York. While Kaplan worked primarily for labor unions, he occasionally provided services for employers.

By the beginning of 1923, however, Kaplan began to face increasing competition from rivals. Jacob "Little Augie" Orgen had just been released from prison and had gathered back his gang. Prominent among his gang were Jack "Legs" Diamond, Louis "Lepke" Buchalter, and Gurrah Shapiro. Kaplan and Orgen soon began fighting over protection of wet wash laundry workers in violent shootouts around New York. In one such altercation, Jacob Gurrah Shapiro was assaulted by Kaplan personally with his gun. Little Augie took this as an opportunity and had Shapiro go to the cops and press charges.

On August 28, 1923, Kaplan was arrested for carrying a concealed weapon and arraigned at Essex Market Court. News of the arrest attracted a large crowd of reporters and bystanders. As Kaplan was being transferred to another court, led by a police escort, he was shot and killed by Orgen gunman Louis Kerzner just after he entered a police car. Orgen gained control of Kaplan's operations until his own violent death in October 1927, possibly at the hands of Buchalter and Shapiro.
