= Gas House Gang =

New York City street gang

The Gas House Gang was a New York City street gang during the late nineteenth century.

Founded in the 1890s, the Gas House Gang was based in the Gas House district of Manhattan and controlled the area along Third Avenue from 11th to 18th Street. Specializing in armed robbery, the gang was estimated to have committed between 30 and 40 robberies a night as well as extorting money from local residents and operating brothels. The gang continued to control the district for over two decades until it was eventually absorbed by the Five Points Gang in 1910.
