= Jacob Shapiro =

American mob boss

Jacob "Gurrah" Shapiro
- NYPD mugshot of Jacob Shapiro
- Born: May 5, 1899; Odesa, Russian Empire (now Ukraine)
- Died: June 9, 1947 (aged 48); Sing Sing Prison, Ossining, New York, U.S.
- Resting place: Montefiore Cemetery
- Other names: Charles Shapiro, Morris Friedman, Samuel Dishouse, Samuel Disnahusen
- Citizenship: American
- Organization(s): Murder, Inc.
- Opponent: U.S. Attorney Thomas E. Dewey
- Criminal charges: Conspiracy and Extortion
- Penalty: 15 years to life in prison

Jacob "Gurrah" Shapiro (May 5, 1899 – June 9, 1947) (also known as Charles Shapiro, Morris Friedman, Samuel Dishouse, and Samuel Disnahusen) was a New York mobster who, with his partner Louis "Lepke" Buchalter, dominated labor racketeering in the garment industry in New York for two decades and led the Murder, Inc. organization.

== Early years ==
Jacob Shapiro was born either "around 1895" or in 1896 or 1897 or 1899 in either Minsk or Odesa. He emigrated to the United States with his family in 1907 or thereabouts.

Growing up in the Lower East Side section of New York City, Shapiro teamed up with Lepke Buchalter to engage in shakedowns of pushcart peddlers; Shapiro allegedly got his nickname "Gurrah" from those peddlers' shouts of "Gerrarah here, Jake" (Get out of here, Jake). Shapiro and Lepke soon graduated to grand larceny, for which both were sent to Sing Sing prison in 1917.

== Labor racketeering ==
In the early 1920s, after their release from prison, Shapiro and Buchalter went into the business of labor racketeering in the garment industry. Buchalter served as the brains and Shapiro provided the muscle in an alliance that lasted for decades.

They began, like their predecessors, by providing "muscle" to either employers or unions during strikes, working for Jacob Orgen, who had previously wrested control of this racket from Nathan Kaplan in the decade-long Labor Slugger Wars. After working for Orgen for a while, Buchalter and Shapiro, sometimes called simply "L&G" (short for Lepke and Gurrah) started planning to take over his operations. Realizing that L&G posed a threat, Orgen allied himself with brothers Eddie and Jack "Legs" Diamond.

Shapiro and Buchalter soon made their move. On October 15, 1927, Orgen and Jack Diamond were standing on the corner of Delancey and Norfolk Street on the Lower East Side. Two gunmen (thought to be Shapiro and Buchalter) drove up to the corner. One gunman got out of the car and started shooting while the driver began shooting from inside the car. Orgen was killed instantly and Jack Diamond was severely wounded.

With Orgen's death, Shapiro and Buchalter took over his labor racketeering operation. Buchalter and Shapiro then moved toward establishing a larger and more enduring role in the Garment District by using intimidation, ranging from threats of violence to murder, to infiltrate garment unions, which enabled them to siphon dues from those local unions.

That in turn gave them the ability to extort payoffs from employers, either in return for allowing them to remain nonunion or as the price of entering into "sweetheart contracts" or avoiding a strike. When they had acquired a dominant enough position in a particular segment of the garment industry they could then proceed to organize the employers into protective associations, extracting payoffs disguised as membership fees from those companies they had coerced into joining and driving their competitors out of business.

Buchalter and Shapiro were prosecuted for violation of federal antitrust law when they used these tactics against employers in the fur industry in New York City in the early 1930s. L&G organized two trade associations, one limited to seventeen rabbit skin dressing companies, and a second that covered dressers of furs other than rabbit skins.

The two associations sought to eliminate any competition from non-member groups by threats, followed by acid or bomb attacks if not complied with. The associations then informed the companies who dealt in furs that they were to obtain their product exclusively from those fur dressers named by the association at the prices set by the association. The associations also sought to eliminate any unions that threatened its monopoly, murdering a union organizer who had rejected one of the associations' demands.

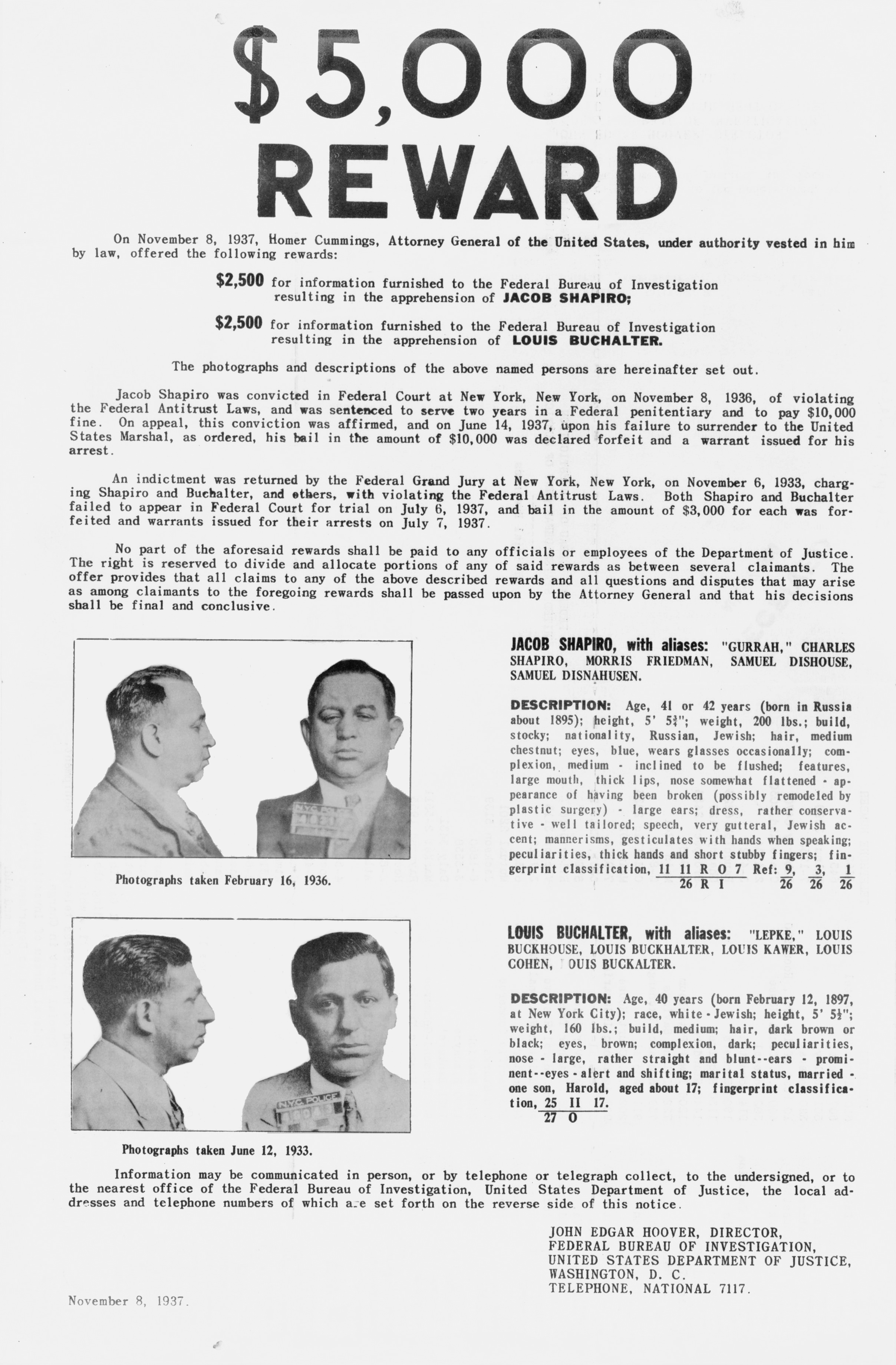
A November 1937 FBI wanted poster for Shapiro and Buchalter.

The government indicted Shapiro, Buchalter and 156 others for violations of the Sherman Antitrust Act in 1933. Shapiro and Buchalter were convicted in 1936 and sentenced to two years in prison and fined $10,000 apiece. Rather than serve their sentence, both went into hiding. Shapiro turned himself in a year later, complaining that being hunted wherever he went was like being in jail.

== Murder, Inc. ==
Although the pair are thought to have started Murder Inc., the enterprise was already thriving when the pair became one of their top clients next to the "National Crime Syndicate", a confederation of crime families created by Charles "Lucky" Luciano and Meyer Lansky in 1929. The Syndicate was created to avoid the bloody gang wars of the 1920s by creating an organization with the power to mediate organized crime disputes and punish offenders. Murder, Inc. served as the enforcement arm of the Syndicate.

== Increased government pressure ==
During the early 1930s, Thomas E. Dewey started to prosecute organized crime members in New York City, first as Chief Assistant U.S. Attorney for the Southern District of New York, then later as the Special Prosecutor for New York County appointed by Governor Herbert H. Lehman in 1935. The pressure created by Dewey was such that in 1935 mobster Dutch Schultz decided to murder Dewey and asked Albert Anastasia, then an underboss of the Mangano crime family, to carry out the hit.

Anastasia notified his good friend Luciano of Schultz's request. Shapiro and Anastasia agreed with Schultz, but they had no vote on the question. Luciano persuaded the other members of the Commission that killing Dewey would precipitate a massive law enforcement crackdown and ordered Buchalter to eliminate Schultz. On October 23, 1935, before he could kill Dewey, Schultz was shot in a tavern in Newark, New Jersey, dying the following day.

After Schultz's death, Shapiro and Buchalter became subject to even more attention from both federal and state prosecutors. When Shapiro and Buchalter were convicted of federal Sherman Act violations in 1936 both went into hiding for more than a year. When Shapiro finally surfaced he faced prosecution by Dewey's office for his labor racketeering activities in the garment industry. Shapiro pled guilty to a charge of extortion in 1943. A year later, when he was sentenced to 15 years to life in prison, Shapiro burst into tears.

When Buchalter was on trial in New York for murder in 1941 Shapiro allegedly smuggled him a note that read, "I told you so." Shapiro died in prison in 1947, convinced that he and others would have remained free had Dewey been killed.
