= Johnny Spanish =

American mobster (1889–1919)

- Born: 1889; New York City, U.S.
- Died: July 29, 1919 (aged 30); New York City, U.S.
- Cause of death: Murdered
- Other names: John Weyler; John Wheiler
- Occupations: Labor racketeer, armed robber, drug dealer
- Status: Deceased
- Penalty: Seven years imprisonment, 1911–1917

Johnny Spanish (1889 – July 29, 1919) was an American gangster who was a rival of former partner "Kid Dropper" Nathan Kaplan during a garment workers' strike which later become known as the Second Labor Sluggers War in 1919. He became involved in labor racketeering, holdups of saloons and other businesses, and murder before organizing his own gang.

== Biography ==
Born in 1889 as Giovanni Mistretta on the Lower East Side, he claimed to be related to Valeriano Weyler, the last governor of Spanish-ruled Cuba. In reality, he was born to an Italian father and Spanish mother, anglicizing the name to John Mestrett. He became involved in labor racketeering and murder, allegedly involved in a killing at age seventeen, before organizing a crew of thugs allied with the Five Points Gang. Spanish soon became notorious for his daring holdups of saloons and other businesses, particularly in his robbery of a Norfolk Street saloon owned by Mersher the Strong Arm. Spanish, who had earlier boasted that he would return and rob the saloon at a certain time, appeared at the scheduled time, shooting up the bar and assaulting several customers who resisted, before making his escape.

In 1909, Spanish started working together with "Kid Dropper" Nathan Kaplan. The two soon had a falling out that culminated in a knife fight in the street; They fell out because of a dispute over Spanish's then girlfriend, engaging in a vicious street fight in which the Dropper nearly stabbed his rival to death. Once he recovered, Spanish began taking over control of the Kid Jigger's Lower East Side "stuss games", a variant of faro, who contemptuously dismissed the threats. However, during a particularly violent gunfight in one of his attempts to gain control over a particular gambling operation owned by Kid Jigger, an eight-year-old girl was killed. Forced to flee the city, he discovered, when he returned after several months, that his girlfriend had left him for Kaplan. Spanish abducted the woman, who was now pregnant, and drove to a marsh outside Maspeth, New York, where he tied her up against a tree and shot her in the abdomen several times. The woman was found alive several hours later, giving birth to her baby who had three fingers shot off.

Spanish was arrested and sentenced to seven years imprisonment in 1911; coincidentally around the same time Kaplan was arrested for robbery. After being released from prison in 1917 Spanish rejoined Kaplan, as well as several other former Five Point Gang members, working as "labor sluggers".

However Spanish and Kaplan soon began fighting again as the gang split into two separate factions, as each attempted to gain dominance over the New York's "labor slugging" operations. Johnny Spanish during this period became one of the biggest drug dealers in Manhattan, selling both cocaine and heroin. He was assisted by his brother Joseph, appropriately nicknamed, "Joey Spanish". Yet there was too much bad blood between Spanish and the Dropper for either of them to relax. Spanish was shot and killed while entering a Manhattan restaurant at 19 Second Avenue by three unidentified men on July 29, 1919. Charges were brought against Kaplan, who had been identified at the scene, but were later dropped. Kaplan was later shot and killed in August 1923.
