= Joseph Rosenzweig =

New York City labor racketeer in the early 1900s

Joseph "Joe The Greaser" Rosenzweig (17 April 1890 – ), also known as Joe Rosen, was an American New York City labor racketeer in the early 1900s as an ally of "Dopey" Benny Fein during the Labor Slugger Wars (1914–1917).

== Biography ==
Rosenzweig was born to Louis and Matilda Rosenzweig in Bucharest, Romania, that immigrated to New York in 1895. He worked as a tailor's presser for several years before forming a criminal gang around 1907. Controlling labor slugging in New York's Lower East Side, Rosenzweig's organization of around one hundred acted mostly as strikebreakers, specializing in breaking up union picket lines, demonstrations and other protests. With political protection from Tammany Hall, Rosenzweig maintained complete control of strikebreaking and labor slugging well into the early 1910s.

Rosenzweig's dominance was challenged in 1913, when Philip "Pinchey" Paul began a war with Rosenzweig, lasting over several months. The war ended with Paul's death the following year, when he was killed by Rosenzweig and several gunmen, including Jacob Heiseman, Benjamin Snyder, and Hyman Berthstein. When he was later arrested for the murder, Rosenzweig agreed to testify against the other gang members. Despite his testimony, Rosenzweig was sentenced to ten years imprisonment, along with Snyder, to Sing Sing Prison in December 1915. Upon Rosenzweig's release in 1925, he returned to Manhattan to find his gang had long since disappeared. After he received a warning from ex-lieutenant Waxey Gordon against attempting to reform his gang, he soon left New York retiring from crime thereafter.
