= Benjamin Fein =

Jewish American gangster (c. 1889–1962)

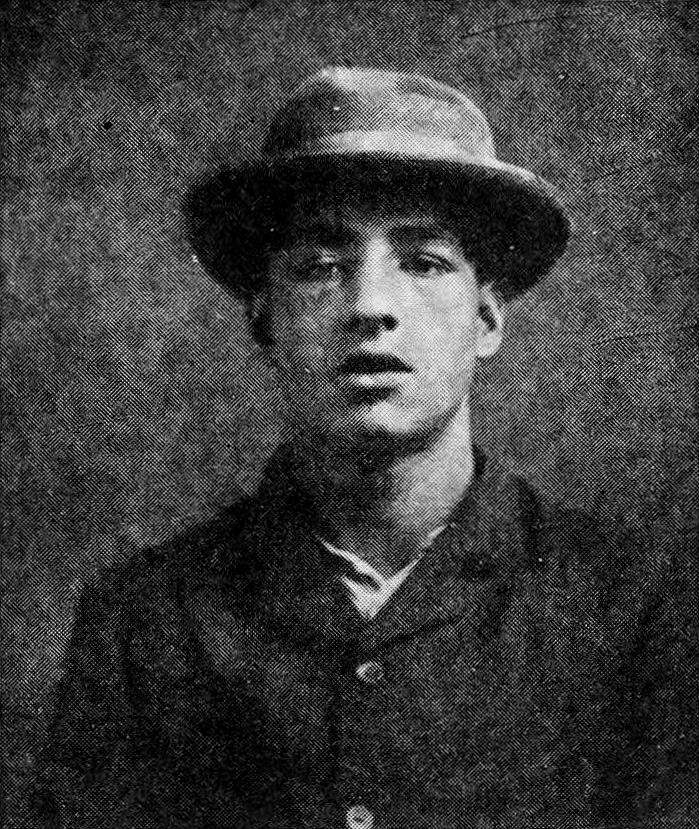
- Fein's NYPD mugshot c. 1910s
- Born: c. 1889; New York City
- Died: 1962; New York City (uncertain)

Benjamin "Dopey Benny" Fein (c. 1889–1962) was an early Jewish American gangster who dominated New York labor racketeering in the 1910s. With a criminal record dating back to 1900, Fein's arrest record included thirty charges from petty theft and assault to grand larceny and murder (of which he was acquitted twice due to lack of evidence). Fein was nicknamed "Dopey Benny" because of his eyes always being halfway-closed due to a medical condition.

== Biography ==
Born in New York City in 1889, Fein grew up in a poor neighborhood on Lower East Side becoming a petty thief and pickpocket as a child. A talented organizer, Fein had formed his own gang of robbers in 1905, and during the next 5 years Fein was sent to Elmira Reformatory several times, including serving 3 1/2 years for armed robbery. Soon after his release in 1910 Fein joined "Big" Jack Zelig's organization, soon becoming involved in labor union and extortion of the Garment District. Fein also used his gang as labor sluggers, renting his gang out to either trade unions or companies, dominating much of New York's East Side eventually earning $20,000 a year. In 1913 several minor labor slugger gangs formed to break the monopoly held by Fein and rival Joseph Rosenzweig in which a large shootout took place on Grand Street and Forsyth Street lasting several hours, although few were killed, beginning the New York Labor slugger war that would last almost four years. Arrested for assault in 1914, Fein agreed to testify against several members involved in labor slugging when his political connections refused to help Fein resulting in the indictments of eleven gangsters and 21 union officials; however, none would be brought to trial. That same year Fein was again arrested for the murder of court clerk Frederick Strauss, who was killed in the crossfire during a shootout near St. Mark's Place; however, he was later released when witnesses could not identify Fein at the scene. In 1915, Fein was arrested again and convicted on a murder charge. After his release in 1917 for the labor slugging related murder two years earlier, Fein's power had declined and by the end of the gang war, with Rosenzweig in prison for manslaughter, Fein decided to retire, becoming a successful garment businessman.

In July 1931, appearing in court for the first time in thirteen years, Fein was arraigned at Essex Market Court on felonious assault charges along with Samuel Hirsch and Samuel Rubin after throwing acid on local Brooklyn businessman Mortimer Kahn.

In 1941, Fein was arrested by detectives in a police raid ordered by District Attorney Thomas E. Dewey during which mobsters Abraham Cohen, John Ferraro and two Dallas businessmen, Herman Fogel and Samuel Klein, were also taken into custody after purchasing a recently stolen garment shipment valued at $10,000.

He and Cohen were named as the ringleaders of a criminal gang that from armed robbery and burglary, took in an estimated $250,000 over a three-year period raiding the city's garment industry. Held in The Tombs until their trial, Fein was spared a mandatory life sentence for fourth-time offenders and instead received a reduced sentence of ten to twenty years, disappearing from public records sometime after.
