= Cash (surname) =

- Language: English, Scottish Gaelic

Origin
- Languages: English, Scottish Gaelic
- Meaning: Various; in Highland Gaelic contexts, a phonetic contraction of Mac Tamhais (Son of Thomas), the Gaelic root of MacTavish

Other names
- Variant forms: MacCosh, MacCash, MacCaus, MacCavish
- Anglicisations: Scottish Gaelic Mac Tamhais, MacCash, MacCosh

Cash is an Anglo-Scottish surname with several distinct origins.

In its most common usage, Cash is an English occupational or descriptive surname. However, in the western Highlands of Scotland, particularly in Argyll and Knapdale, Cash derives from a phonetic contraction of the Scottish Gaelic Mac Tamhais — the Gaelic root of MacTavish — meaning Son of Thomas. The contraction follows the same linguistic transition as other MacTavish variant forms including MacCosh, MacCaus, and MacCavish, all of which share the same Gaelic origin. In this Highland context Cash is an associated family name of Clan MacTavish, and is genealogically distinct from unrelated Lowland or English families of the same surname.

== Notable people with the surname ==
- A. J. Cash (1838–1892), American merchant
- Alan-Michael Cash (born 1987), American football player
- Andrew Cash (born 1962), Canadian singer-songwriter
- Aya Cash (born 1982), American television, film and stage actress
- Bill Cash (born 1940), British Member of Parliament
- Chris Cash (American football) (born 1980), player for the Atlanta Falcons
- Christine Benton Cash (1889–1988), American educator
- Cliff Cash (born 1980 or 1981), American stand-up comedian
- Craig Cash (born 1960), English comedy writer and performer
- Dave Cash (baseball) (born 1948), former Major League baseball player
- Dave Cash (DJ) (1942–2016), British radio presenter
- Dave Cash (Yiddish comedian), Romanian-born Yiddish comedian
- David Cash (born 1969), birth name of American wrestler performing as "Kid Kash"
- Doug Cash (1919–2002), Australian politician
- Dylan Cash (born 1994), American child actor
- Felix Cash (born 1993), British boxer
- Fred Cash (born 1940), African-American soul singer
- Gerald Cash (1917–2003), third Governor-General of the Commonwealth of the Bahamas
- George Cash (born 1946), Australian politician
- George Washington Cash (1841–1912), American merchant
- James Bailey Cash Jr. (1932–1938), American murder victim
- James Cash Jr. (born 1947), American businessman
- Jessica Cash (1939–2023), British soprano and voice coach
- Jim Cash (1941–2000), American film writer
- Johnny Cash (1932–2003), American singer-songwriter
  - June Carter Cash (1929–2003), Johnny's wife
  - John Carter Cash (born 1970), Johnny's son
  - Rosanne Cash (born 1955), Johnny's daughter
  - Tommy Cash (1940–2024), Johnny's brother
  - Carey Cash, Johnny's grand-nephew
  - Kellye Cash, Johnny's grand-niece
- Kevin Cash (born 1977), American Major League baseball catcher
- Martin Cash (1808–1877), famous escaped convict in Australia
- Matty Cash (born 1997), Polish footballer
- Michaelia Cash (born 1970), Australian politician
- Nayvadius DeMun Cash (born 1983), American rapper
- Norm Cash (1934–1986), American Major League baseball player
- Pat Cash (born 1965), Australian professional tennis player
- Peter Cash, Canadian singer-songwriter
- Porkchop Cash (born 1955), stage name of American professional wrestler Bobby Cash
- Ralston Cash (born 1991), American baseball player
- Ray Cash (born 1980), American rapper
- Ron Cash (1949–2009), American Major League Baseball player
- Rosalind Cash (1938–1995), American singer and actress
- Steve Cash (1946–2019), American singer-songwriter
- Swin Cash (born 1979), American Woman's National Basketball Association player
- Tommy Cash (rapper) (born 1991), Estonian rapper
- Tabatha Cash (born 1973), French pornographic actress
- Wilbur J. Cash (politician) (1887–1956), American politician, farmer, and politician
- Wiley Cash, American author
- W. J. Cash (1900–1941), American author and journalist
- William Cash (author and journalist), British journalist
- William H. H. Cash (1843–1924), American businessman and politician
