= List of people executed in the United States in 1941 =

One hundred and twenty-three people, one hundred and twenty-two male and one female, were executed in the United States in 1941, eighty-five by electrocution, twenty-three by gas chamber, and fifteen by hanging.

== List of people executed in the United States in 1941 ==
No.	Date of execution	Name	Age of person			Gender	Ethnicity	State	Method	Ref.
No.	Date of execution	Name	At execution	At offense	Age difference	Gender	Ethnicity	State	Method	Ref.
1	January 3, 1941	Eddie Hayes	20	19	1	Male	Black	Georgia	Electrocution	
2	January 3, 1941	Johnnie Watson	33	32	1	Male	Black	Georgia	Electrocution	
3	January 3, 1941	Columbus Richardson	28	26	2	Male	Black	Kentucky	Electrocution	
4	January 3, 1941	Wilburn Johnson	39	39	0	Male	Black	Missouri	Gas chamber	
5	January 9, 1941	Major Greenfield	33	32	1	Male	Black	New York	Electrocution	
6	January 10, 1941	Joe Coates	63	61	2	Male	Black	Colorado	Gas chamber	
7	January 10, 1941	Wilson J. Knott	33	33	0	Male	White	Maryland	Hanging	
8	January 14, 1941	Curnel T. Robinson	34	34	0	Male	Black	Delaware	Hanging	
9	January 14, 1941	Anthony Cirasole	31	30	1	Male	White	Ohio	Electrocution	
10	January 14, 1941	Joseph DiMarco	24	23	1	Male	White	Ohio	Electrocution	
11	January 17, 1941	William Clark	18	16	2	Male	Black	Alabama	Electrocution	
12	January 24, 1941	John Mooney	27	27	0	Male	Black	Arkansas	Electrocution	
13	January 30, 1941	Arley Ovoyd Lewis	29	28	1	Male	White	Washington	Hanging	
14	January 31, 1941	Dewitt Clinton Cook	22	20	2	Male	White	California	Gas chamber	
15	January 31, 1941	Josiah Woodward	21	21	0	Male	Black	South Carolina	Electrocution	
16	February 6, 1941	Eugene Brown	26	24	2	Male	Black	New York	Electrocution	
17	February 6, 1941	Norman Williams	32	30	2	Male	Black	New York	Electrocution	
18	February 6, 1941	Hugh McClain Evans	22	22	0	Male	White	South Carolina	Electrocution	
19	February 6, 1941	Willis Evans	19	18	1	Male	White	South Carolina	Electrocution	
20	February 6, 1941	Hampton Lee	25	24	1	Male	White	South Carolina	Electrocution	
21	February 6, 1941	James Claude Hann	28	27	1	Male	White	South Carolina	Electrocution	
22	February 13, 1941	Arcangelo D'Agosto	27	26	1	Male	White	New York	Electrocution	
23	February 13, 1941	Walter Dowling	21	20	1	Male	White	New York	Electrocution	
24	February 13, 1941	George Dolny	23	22	1	Male	White	New York	Electrocution	
25	February 20, 1941	David Adler	27	26	1	Male	White	New York	Electrocution	
26	February 20, 1941	Hyman Balatnicov	28	27	1	Male	White	New York	Electrocution	
27	February 20, 1941	Joseph Patrick Carosella	26	25	1	Male	White	New York	Electrocution	
28	February 21, 1941	Ascension Martinez	37	30	7	Male	Hispanic	Texas	Electrocution	
29	February 21, 1941	Theodia Muldrow	19	18	1	Male	Black	Texas	Electrocution	
30	February 25, 1941	William John Sevastis	55	54	1	Male	White	Ohio	Electrocution	
31	March 7, 1941	William Meharg	25	25	0	Male	White	Louisiana	Hanging	
32	March 7, 1941	Floyd Boyce	29	28	1	Male	White	Louisiana	Hanging	
33	March 7, 1941	William Heard	43	42	1	Male	White	Louisiana	Hanging	
34	March 7, 1941	William Landers	39	38	1	Male	White	Louisiana	Hanging	
35	March 24, 1941	Denzel B. Davis	24	23	1	Male	White	Washington	Hanging	
36	March 31, 1941	Paul Petrillo	49	39	10	Male	White	Pennsylvania	Electrocution	
37	April 11, 1941	Will Hood	29	Unknown	Unknown	Male	Black	South Carolina	Electrocution	
38	April 15, 1941	Richard Smith	48	38	10	Male	Black	Florida	Electrocution	
39	April 18, 1941	Thomas Benjamin Smith	60	58	2	Male	White	California	Gas chamber	
40	April 18, 1941	Dollie Lee Hudson	27	25	2	Male	Black	North Carolina	Gas chamber	
41	April 18, 1941	Van Gilmore	31	30	1	Male	Black	Tennessee	Electrocution	
42	April 20, 1941	George Griffin	26	25	1	Male	Black	Texas	Electrocution	
43	April 22, 1941	Leo Joseph Rousseau	30	29	1	Male	White	Massachusetts	Electrocution	
44	May 2, 1941	Sylvester Woodard	34	Unknown	Unknown	Male	Black	North Carolina	Gas chamber	
45	May 12, 1941	William Bland	23	Unknown	Unknown	Male	Black	Georgia	Electrocution	
46	May 15, 1941	A. C. Payton	41	Unknown	Unknown	Male	Black	Arkansas	Electrocution	
47	May 15, 1941	James Grady White	38	37	1	Male	White	Mississippi	Electrocution	
48	May 16, 1941	Booker T. Childress	Unknown	Unknown	Unknown	Male	Black	Mississippi	Electrocution	
49	May 23, 1941	Charlie Anderson	18	Unknown	Unknown	Male	Black	Georgia	Electrocution	
50	May 23, 1941	Willie Jenkins	23	19	4	Male	Black	Georgia	Electrocution	
51	May 23, 1941	Matthew Douglas	32	32	0	Male	Black	Mississippi	Electrocution	
52	May 23, 1941	James Shaw	21	20	1	Male	Black	North Carolina	Gas chamber	
53	June 5, 1941	Peter Salemi	33	32	1	Male	White	New York	Electrocution	
54	June 6, 1941	Percy Lee Lewis	30	29	1	Male	Black	Arkansas	Electrocution	
55	June 6, 1941	Fleet Jack Wall	33	32	1	Male	Black	North Carolina	Gas chamber	
56	June 6, 1941	Tommie Harris	20	19	1	Male	Black	Texas	Electrocution	
57	June 12, 1941	Martin Goldstein	36	34	2	Male	White	New York	Electrocution	
58	June 12, 1941	Harry Strauss	31	30	1	Male	White	New York	Electrocution	
59	June 13, 1941	Noah Cureton	51	50	1	Male	Black	North Carolina	Gas chamber	
60	June 20, 1941	John Henry Riney	25	25	0	Male	Black	Arkansas	Electrocution	
61	June 20, 1941	James Stephens	76	74	2	Male	White	Colorado	Gas chamber	
62	June 20, 1941	Orville C. Watson	31	29	2	Male	White	Illinois	Electrocution	
63	June 20, 1941	Edward Riley	27	25	2	Male	White	Illinois	Electrocution	
64	June 27, 1941	French Lee White	23	Unknown	Unknown	Male	Black	Maryland	Hanging	
65	July 4, 1941	Grover Chism	48	47	1	Male	White	Kentucky	Electrocution	
66	July 10, 1941	Stanley Cole	35	33	2	Male	White	New York	Electrocution	
67	July 10, 1941	Dewey Garrett	21	20	1	Male	Black	New York	Electrocution	
68	July 11, 1941	Julius Jackson	29	28	1	Male	Black	Alabama	Electrocution	
69	July 11, 1941	Wong Don Kay	57	56	1	Male	Asian	California	Gas chamber	
70	July 11, 1941	Heyward Daniels	28	56	Unknown	Male	Black	South Carolina	Electrocution	
71	July 18, 1941	Walter Reed	55	55	0	Male	Black	Tennessee	Electrocution	
72	July 24, 1941	Willie Lee Porter	21	20	1	Male	Black	Tennessee	Electrocution	
73	July 24, 1941	Carl Leonard Cole	19	18	1	Male	Black	Tennessee	Electrocution	
74	July 30, 1941	Lawrence West	Unknown	Unknown	Unknown	Male	Black	Tennessee	Electrocution	
75	August 8, 1941	Frank Bass	22	Unknown	Unknown	Male	Black	Alabama	Electrocution	
76	August 8, 1941	Robert Jones	24	Unknown	Unknown	Male	Black	Alabama	Electrocution	
77	August 15, 1941	Benjamin Heyward	Unknown	Unknown	16	Male	Black	South Carolina	Electrocution	
78	August 22, 1941	Hubert Yober Cash	40	39	1	Male	White	North Carolina	Gas chamber	
79	August 24, 1941	Arlin Fairfax Reese	46	45	1	Male	White	Texas	Electrocution	
80	August 29, 1941	Eldon Richard Hawk	26	25	1	Male	White	California	Gas chamber	
81	August 29, 1941	John William Lininger	40	39	1	Male	White	California	Gas chamber	
82	August 29, 1941	William Smiddy	37	36	1	Male	White	Kentucky	Electrocution	
83	August 29, 1941	Warren Lorenzo Abby	57	55	2	Male	White	Oklahoma	Electrocution	
84	September 5, 1941	William L. Johansen	36	30	6	Male	White	California	Gas chamber	
85	September 5, 1941	Tom Melvin	42	40	2	Male	Black	North Carolina	Gas chamber	
86	September 11, 1941	Eugene Johnson	22	Unknown	Unknown	Male	Black	Louisiana	Electrocution	
87	September 18, 1941	George Zeitz	26	24	2	Male	White	New York	Electrocution	
88	September 19, 1941	Mariano Flores	54	Unknown	Unknown	Male	Asian	Hawaii Territory	Hanging	
89	September 26, 1941	John E. Reed	42	41	1	Male	White	California	Gas chamber	
90	September 26, 1941	Earl F. Loveless	22	21	1	Male	White	Maryland	Hanging	
91	September 26, 1941	James Lee Miller	30	29	1	Male	White	Maryland	Hanging	
92	September 26, 1941	Charlie Brown	26	Unknown	Unknown	Male	Black	Virginia	Electrocution	
93	October 6, 1941	Wilburn R. Crews	37	33	4	Male	White	Florida	Electrocution	
94	October 6, 1941	Dan Jordan Ormond	51	47	4	Male	White	Florida	Electrocution	
95	October 6, 1941	Charles Henderson	34	30	4	Male	Black	Florida	Electrocution	
96	October 6, 1941	Frizell McLaren	34	31	3	Male	Black	Florida	Electrocution	
97	October 10, 1941	Albert Alford	32	Unknown	Unknown	Male	Black	Georgia	Electrocution	
98	October 10, 1941	George Peele	21	20	1	Male	Black	North Carolina	Gas chamber	
99	October 11, 1941	John Washington	32	Unknown	Unknown	Male	Black	Arkansas	Electrocution	
100	October 20, 1941	Herman Petrillo	47	37	10	Male	White	Pennsylvania	Electrocution	
101	October 23, 1941	Austin Williams	30	Unknown	Unknown	Male	Black	Louisiana	Electrocution	
102	October 24, 1941	Anaclito Gagarin	37	35	2	Male	Asian	Hawaii Territory	Hanging	
103	October 27, 1941	Paul H. Mardorff	50	48	2	Male	White	Florida	Electrocution	
104	October 27, 1941	Mack Ranson	38	36	2	Male	Black	Florida	Electrocution	
105	October 27, 1941	William Joseph Earnest	36	35	1	Male	White	Pennsylvania	Electrocution	
106	October 30, 1941	James Harvey Thomas	19	19	0	Male	White	Oregon	Gas chamber	
107	November 12, 1941	Ivan Leon Sullivan	30	28	2	Male	White	Iowa	Hanging	
108	November 14, 1941	Milton L. Hawkins	25	23	2	Male	White	Indiana	Electrocution	
109	November 14, 1941	John Bruce Anderson	52	51	1	Male	White	Washington	Hanging	
110	November 21, 1941	Evelita Juanita Spinelli	52	50	2	Female	White	California	Gas chamber	
111	November 21, 1941	Roy Long	27	Unknown	Unknown	Male	Black	South Carolina	Electrocution	
112	November 24, 1941	Harold B. Frisbie	34	33	1	Male	White	Pennsylvania	Electrocution	
113	November 24, 1941	Willie Jones	Unknown	Unknown	1	Male	Black	Pennsylvania	Electrocution	
114	November 28, 1941	Gordon Hawkins	23	21	2	Male	White	California	Gas chamber	
115	November 28, 1941	Mike Simeone	32	31	1	Male	White	California	Gas chamber	
116	December 2, 1941	William Zupkosky	32	31	1	Male	White	New Jersey	Electrocution	
117	December 12, 1941	Luther Morrow	26	26	0	Male	Black	North Carolina	Gas chamber	
118	December 19, 1941	James Baker	38	38	0	Male	Black	Maryland	Hanging	
119	December 19, 1941	Thomas Williams	37	37	0	Male	Black	Ohio	Electrocution	
120	December 28, 1941	Albert Wesley Jr.	19	18	1	Male	Black	Texas	Electrocution	
121	December 29, 1941	Willie B. Clay	19	15	4	Male	Black	Florida	Electrocution	
122	December 29, 1941	Edward Powell	18	15	3	Male	Black	Florida	Electrocution	
123	December 29, 1941	Nathaniel Walker	18	14	4	Male	Black	Florida	Electrocution	

== Demographics ==
Gender
Male	122	99%
Female	1	1%
Ethnicity
Black	61	50%
White	58	47%
Asian	3	2%
Hispanic	1	1%
State
New York	15	12%
California	10	8%
Florida	10	8%
North Carolina	9	7%
South Carolina	9	7%
Georgia	6	5%
Louisiana	6	5%
Texas	6	5%
Arkansas	5	4%
Maryland	5	4%
Pennsylvania	5	4%
Tennessee	5	4%
Alabama	4	3%
Ohio	4	3%
Kentucky	3	2%
Mississippi	3	2%
Washington	3	2%
Colorado	2	2%
Hawaii Territory	2	2%
Illinois	2	2%
Delaware	1	1%
Indiana	1	1%
Iowa	1	1%
Massachusetts	1	1%
Missouri	1	1%
New Jersey	1	1%
Oklahoma	1	1%
Oregon	1	1%
Virginia	1	1%
Method
Electrocution	85	69%
Gas chamber	23	19%
Hanging	15	12%
Month
January	15	12%
February	15	12%
March	6	5%
April	7	6%
May	9	7%
June	12	10%
July	10	8%
August	9	7%
September	9	7%
October	14	11%
November	9	7%
December	8	7%
Age
Unknown	4	3%
10–19	10	8%
20–29	46	37%
30–39	39	32%
40–49	11	9%
50–59	10	8%
60–69	2	2%
70–79	1	1%
Total	123	100%

== Executions in recent years ==
Number of executions
1942	147
1941	123
1940	124
Total	394

Preceded by 1940	List of people executed in the United States in 1941	Succeeded by 1942
