= Dave Cash =

Dave or David Cash may refer to:

- Dave Cash (baseball) (born 1948), former Major League Baseball second baseman
- Dave Cash (DJ) (1942–2016), British radio presenter
- Dave Cash (Yiddish comedian), Romanian-born French Yiddish-language comedian
- David Cash, birth name of American wrestler performing as Kid Kash
- David Cash, Jr., witness to rapist-murderer Jeremy Strohmeyer
