= Roena Muckelroy Savage =

American choir director and educator (1904–1991)

Rowena Muckelroy Savage
- Roena Muckelroy Savage, from a 1933 publication
- Born: Roena Muckelroy; October 30, 1904; Henderson, Texas, U.S.
- Died: October 29, 1991 (aged 86); Los Angeles, California, U.S.
- Other names: Rowene Muckelroy Savage
- Education: University of Southern California
- Occupation(s): Singer, choir director, voice educator
- Employer(s): Lincoln University (Missouri); Jarvis Christian University
- Spouse: W. Sherman Savage

Roena Muckelroy Savage (October 30, 1904 – October 29, 1991) was an American concert soprano, voice educator, and choir director.

== Early life ==
Roena Eloise Muckelroy was born in Henderson, Texas, and raised in San Bernardino, California, the daughter of William Wainwright Muckelroy and Mary E. Muckelroy. After graduating from San Bernardino High School in 1922, she graduated in 1927 from the University of Southern California, with further voice, piano, and organ studies in Chicago and Columbus, with Richard Hageman, Moissaye Boguslawski, Marcella Craft, and other musicians.

== Career ==
Savage performed as a concert soprano. In 1927, she won awards for singing at the Los Angeles District Eisteddfod, and the California Grand Finals Eisteddfod. In Missouri, she was a soloist with the People's Symphony Orchestra in St. Louis, and she was director of music at Lincoln University, where her husband was a professor of history.

In 1939, she directed a "Yuletide pageant" of forty performers in San Bernardino, using traditional black spirituals. She wrote and directed a musical play based on Spanish and Mexican folksongs in 1940. In California during World War II, she organized and led a choir of war workers near San Bernardino, performing as the Legend A Cappella choir. She toured the American South giving concerts in 1949. In 1962, she joined the summer opera chorus of the Redlands Bowl. Later in life, she was associate professor of voice and chair of the humanities department at Jarvis Christian College in Texas, and wrote a musical pageant, Hearthstones.

She was active in the Missouri State and Jefferson City branches of the NAACP, and a charter member the Los Angeles alumnae chapter of Delta Sigma Theta.

== Personal life ==
Roena Muckelroy married history professor W. Sherman Savage in 1927. They had two daughters, Eloise (born 1936) and Inez (born 1939). She was widowed in 1981, and she died in 1991, the day before her 87th birthday, in Los Angeles.
