= Jarvis Christian University =

Historically black university in Texas, US

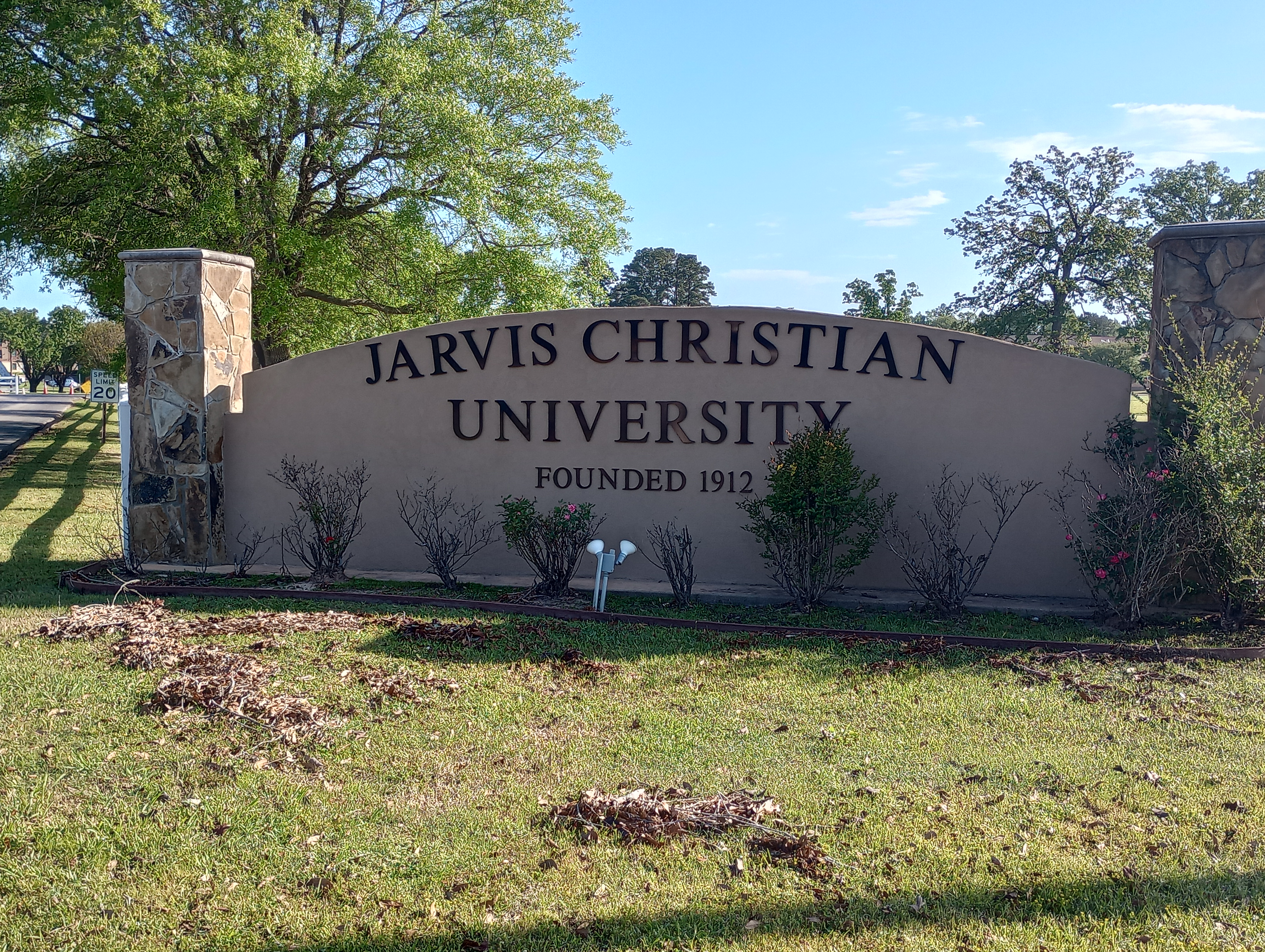
- Former names: Jarvis Christian Institute (1912–1929); Jarvis Christian College (1929–2022)
- Type: Private historically black college
- Established: 1912; 114 years ago
- Religious affiliation: Christian Church (Disciples of Christ)
- President: Glenell M. Lee-Pruitt
- Students: 800
- Location: Hawkins, Texas, United States; 32.589192°N 95.179823°W
- Campus: 1,000 acres
- Colors: Blue and gold
- Nickname: Bulldogs
- Sporting affiliations: NAIA – RRAC
- Website: www.jarvis.edu

Jarvis Christian University (JCU) is a private historically black Christian college in Wood County, Texas. It was founded in 1912. It had a total undergraduate enrollment of 867 in the fall of 2019. During the 2022–2023 academic year, Jarvis Christian College was renamed Jarvis Christian University and it began offering graduate programs the following year.

== History ==
Although formal instructional programs at Jarvis began on January 13, 1913, with an enrollment of 12 students, all in the elementary grades, the school began as early as 1904, when the Negro Disciples of Christ of Texas began to plan for a school for Black youth. A white couple whose families had owned slaves—Major James Jarvis and his wife Ida Van Zandt Jarvis—donated land upon which the school could be built; the Jarvis family deeded 456 acres (185 ha) to the Christian Women's Board of Missions on the condition it be maintained as a school for Blacks. Jarvis opened its doors as Jarvis Christian Institute, modeled after the Southern Christian Institute located west of Jackson in Edwards, Mississippi.

Jarvis is the only historically black college which remains of the twelve founded by the Disciples of Christ Church.

Jarvis' first students were educated in the remains of an old logging camp and later in a cabin which became the school's first multi-purpose building.

=== 1910s ===
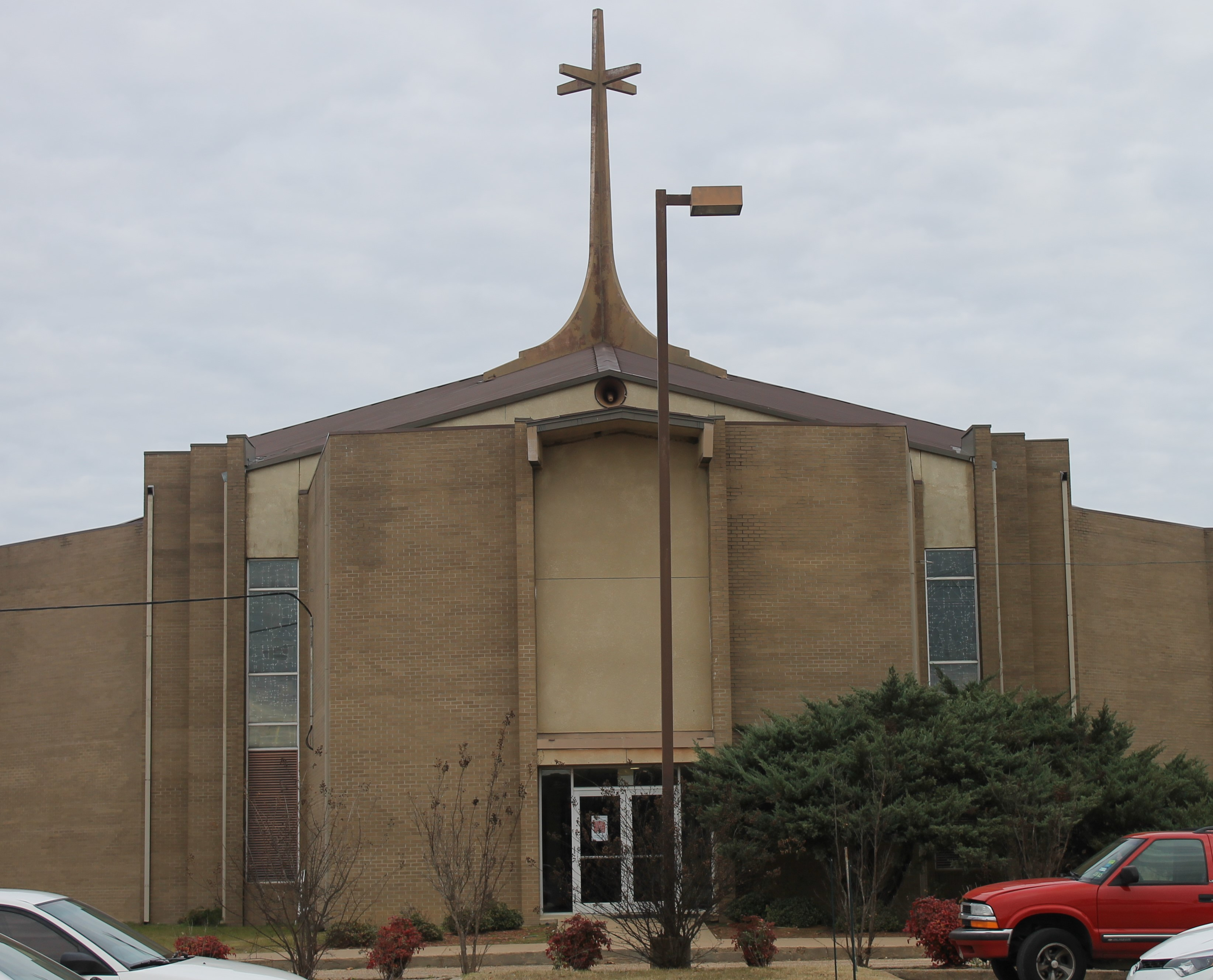
J. N. Ervin Religion and Culture Center at Jarvis Christian University; James Nelson Ervin was the first JCU president, with service from 1914 to 1938. The culture center was built after his tenure as president.

Thomas Buchanan Frost came to the school as superintendent in 1912. Charles Albert Berry joined him as the principal. In 1914, James Nelson Ervin became the first president of Jarvis and served in that capacity until 1938. During the first year of Ervin's tenure, high school classes were added to the curriculum. It became one of the few places at the time at which blacks in East Texas could complete a high school education. Some college work was offered as early as 1916.

The executive committee of the National Women's Board voted in May 1915, to appropriate US$1,000 (equivalent to $31,826 in 2025) for a sawmill that was purchased and installed on campus. The sawmill was operated from the 1920s through the 1940s by male students in the summer. They cut wood for structures on campus and to fire furnaces and stoves used during winter months around campus. Most of the buildings on the Jarvis Campus built during the 1920s–1940s were made with wood from this mill. Most of those buildings burned.

=== 1920s ===
In 1927, junior college courses were integrated into the curriculum. In 1928, the school incorporated as a college.

=== 1930s ===
Senior College course offerings were introduced at Jarvis in 1937. The Emma B. Smith Building, used to house administration offices, was built in 1936 and is the only campus structure surviving from the Ervin presidency.

In 1938, Peter Clarence Washington began his tenure as the second president of Jarvis Christian College. High school work was eliminated from the curriculum the same year.

In 1939, the state of Texas granted a formal charter to Jarvis Christian College.

=== 1940s ===
John B. Eubanks became Executive Vice President of Jarvis in 1949 and is credited with introducing the general education program and helping the school earn recognition from the Southern Association of Colleges and Schools. This recognition came in 1950.

=== 1950s ===
Eubanks became the fourth president of Jarvis Christian College in 1951. In 1953, Cleo Walter Blackburn became college president.

=== 1960s ===
Blackburn ensured an affiliation between Jarvis and Texas Christian University in 1964 that was renewed twice and terminated in 1976. In 1964, Agro-Industrial offerings were eliminated from the curriculum. The Olin Library and Communication Center was opened to students in 1965. In 1966, Perpener became the fifth president of Jarvis and the first alumni appointed to the office. That same year, Jarvis was granted membership in the Southern Association of Colleges and Schools. Jarvis is affiliated with the Texas Association of Developing Colleges, a six-college consortium of historically Black colleges the next year. In 1969, the Charles A. Meyer Science and Mathematics Center opened.

=== 1970s ===
Four additional residence halls were opened on campus in the 1970s.

=== 1990s ===
Sebetha Lee Jenkins became the 10th president of Jarvis Christian College in 1991, and the first woman to hold that position.

=== 2010s ===
In May 2017, it was announced that Jarvis Christian College will open a satellite campus in Dallas at the Redbird Mall beginning August 2017. Courses available are in criminal justice, business management, religion, data analytics, and cybersecurity.

=== 2020s ===
During the 2022–2023 academic year, Jarvis Christian College was renamed Jarvis Christian University with the unveiling of the new signage and logos on May 6, 2022, the day before the first graduating class of Jarvis Christian University received the first-ever diplomas with the school's new name. Jarvis was approved to begin offering graduate degrees. The Jarvis Board of Trustees approved the name change, the rebranding as JCU began. The first JCU graduate programs are an MBA and a Master of Science in Criminal Justice, both programs are set to begin classes online in January 2023.

== Athletics ==
The Jarvis Christian athletic teams are called the Bulldogs. The institution is a member of the National Association of Intercollegiate Athletics (NAIA), primarily competing in the Red River Athletic Conference (RRAC) since the 1998–99 academic year.

Jarvis Christian competes in 15 intercollegiate varsity sports: Men's sports include baseball, basketball, bowling, cross country, golf, soccer, track and field (outdoor) and wrestling; while women's sports include basketball, bowling, cross country, golf, soccer, softball, track & field (outdoor), volleyball and wrestling. The following sports will be added, effective in the 2022–23 school year: men's & women's wrestling, and co-ed competitive cheerleading called the "J Squad".

=== Football ===
Jarvis Christian had a college football team which competed from the 1910s until being discontinued in 1964. Notable coaches of the team included Ace Mumford (1924–1926) and Louis Crews (1957–1959).

=== Accomplishments ===
Jarvis Christian has appeared in the NAIA Men's Division I Basketball Tournament three times: 2003, 2008, and 2009. Jarvis women's track & field team won the RRAC conference championship for track & field in 2021.

== East Texas Natural History Collection ==
Jarvis houses a regional collection of biological specimens in its 10,000 square foot Frost Hall. The collections are concentrated on the herbarium and entomology collections, but also houses minor holdings in other natural history areas of study and historical materials that are related to natural history or land use history.

== Notable people ==
- Shirley J. Allen (born 1941), Jarvis alumna who became the first black and deaf woman to earn a doctorate
- Christine Benton Cash (1889–1988), one of the first Black women in Texas to hold a doctorate, education reformer, taught at Jarvis from 1958 to 1965, chaired the divisions of social sciences and teacher education
- "Ace" Mumford (1898 –1962) an American football coach, head coach at Jarvis from 1924 to 1926, head football coach at historically black colleges and universities in Texas and Louisiana from 1924 to 1961, inducted into at least eight halls of fame for his coaching accomplishments.
- David "Fathead" Newman (1933–2009), jazz and rhythm-and-blues saxophonist best known for his work with Ray Charles. Attended for three years before leaving to play professionally.
- Roena Muckelroy Savage (1904–1991), American concert soprano, musical theater director, playwright, associate professor of voice and chair of the humanities department.
- W. Sherman Savage (1890–1981), an American historian, first black graduate of University of Oregon, author of Blacks in the West, professor and chair of the department of history and social sciences from 1960 to 1970.
- Olujimi Brown, Jarvis alumnus, Atlanta pastor, author, 2026 candidate for governor of Georgia.
