= List of people executed in the United States in 1939 =

One hundred and sixty-two people, all male, were executed in the United States in 1939, one hundred and eighteen by electrocution, thirty by gas chamber, and fourteen by hanging.

The state of New Hampshire would conduct its most recent execution this year.

Joe Arridy, a severely intellectually disabled man, was controversially executed in Colorado despite strong doubt about his guilt. He was posthumously pardoned in 2011.

== List of people executed in the United States in 1939 ==
No.	Date of execution	Name	Age of person			Gender	Ethnicity	State	Method	Ref.
No.	Date of execution	Name	At execution	At offense	Age difference	Gender	Ethnicity	State	Method	Ref.
1	January 5, 1939	Salvatore Gati	29	28	1	Male	White	New York	Electrocution	
2	January 5, 1939	Charles Sberna	29	28	1	Male	White	New York	Electrocution	
3	January 5, 1939	David Lucas	29	28	1	Male	Black	New York	Electrocution	
4	January 6, 1939	Joseph Arridy	23	21	2	Male	Arab	Colorado	Gas chamber	
5	January 11, 1939	White Miller Tollett	30	29	1	Male	White	Tennessee	Electrocution	
6	January 12, 1939	Vincent Forte	20	18	2	Male	White	New York	Electrocution	
7	January 17, 1939	Dominico Nadal	46	45	1	Male	White	Nevada	Gas chamber	
8	January 19, 1939	Ernest Stanley	Unknown	Unknown	1	Male	Black	Tennessee	Electrocution	
9	January 20, 1939	King Solomon Stovall	24	23	1	Male	Black	North Carolina	Gas chamber	
10	January 20, 1939	LeRoy Hershel McCarthy	28	27	1	Male	White	Oregon	Gas chamber	
11	January 20, 1939	Irving Brooks	23	22	1	Male	Black	Virginia	Electrocution	
12	January 25, 1939	Wilson Wright	20	18	2	Male	Black	Georgia	Electrocution	
13	January 26, 1939	Arthur Friedman	21	20	1	Male	White	New York	Electrocution	
14	January 26, 1939	Dominick Guariglia	19	18	1	Male	White	New York	Electrocution	
15	January 26, 1939	Joseph O'Laughlin	23	22	1	Male	White	New York	Electrocution	
16	February 1, 1939	John William Cline	25	24	1	Male	White	Ohio	Electrocution	
17	February 3, 1939	Will Kinard	38	36	2	Male	Black	District of Columbia	Electrocution	
18	February 9, 1939	Thomas Kirby Gilmore	42	41	1	Male	White	New York	Electrocution	
19	February 10, 1939	Loren Sylvester Warner	29	24	5	Male	White	Kentucky	Electrocution	
20	February 10, 1939	Pearlie Houston Evans	37	36	1	Male	White	Mississippi	Hanging	
21	February 10, 1939	John Anderson	27	27	0	Male	Black	Virginia	Electrocution	
22	February 15, 1939	John Flannery Williamson	62	59	3	Male	White	Missouri	Gas chamber	
23	February 16, 1939	Thomas J. Bohan	33	24	9	Male	White	New York	Electrocution	
24	February 16, 1939	Michael Hermanowski	23	22	1	Male	White	New York	Electrocution	
25	February 17, 1939	Fred Ware	24	Unknown	Unknown	Male	Black	Alabama	Electrocution	
26	February 17, 1939	Elgie Stephens	24	22	2	Male	Black	Louisiana	Hanging	
27	February 20, 1939	Paul Fried Bunge	53	52	1	Male	White	Florida	Electrocution	
28	February 23, 1939	Michael Alex	27	26	1	Male	White	New York	Electrocution	
29	February 24, 1939	Franklin Pierce McCall Jr.	22	22	0	Male	White	Florida	Electrocution	
30	February 27, 1939	William McKinley Blackwell	41	39	2	Male	Black	Pennsylvania	Electrocution	
31	March 3, 1939	Bonnie Griffin	23	21	2	Male	White	Kentucky	Electrocution	
32	March 3, 1939	Arnold Powell	22	20	2	Male	White	Kentucky	Electrocution	
33	March 3, 1939	Frank Tracy	33	33	0	Male	White	Ohio	Electrocution	
34	March 6, 1939	Winzell Williams	18	17	1	Male	Black	Texas	Electrocution	
35	March 10, 1939	Joseph B. Anderson	37	36	1	Male	White	Arkansas	Electrocution	
36	March 10, 1939	Fred L. Brown	47	Unknown	Unknown	Male	White	Maryland	Hanging	
37	March 17, 1939	Joe Lee Kennedy	33	Unknown	Unknown	Male	Black	Alabama	Electrocution	
38	March 17, 1939	Edward Wimbush	22	21	1	Male	Black	Alabama	Electrocution	
39	March 24, 1939	Willie Waters	47	45	2	Male	Black	Kentucky	Electrocution	
40	March 24, 1939	George B. Wingard	20	18	2	Male	White	South Carolina	Electrocution	
41	March 24, 1939	William B. Gentry	24	23	1	Male	White	South Carolina	Electrocution	
42	March 24, 1939	Roy D. Suttles	30	28	2	Male	White	South Carolina	Electrocution	
43	March 24, 1939	Herbert H. Moorman	42	40	2	Male	White	South Carolina	Electrocution	
44	March 24, 1939	Clayton Crans	29	27	2	Male	White	South Carolina	Electrocution	
45	March 24, 1939	John Valentine Bair Jr.	28	27	1	Male	White	South Carolina	Electrocution	
46	March 27, 1939	Thomas Roy Lockard	26	23	3	Male	White	Pennsylvania	Electrocution	
47	March 28, 1939	Hyman Johnson	22	21	1	Male	Black	Tennessee	Electrocution	
48	March 28, 1939	Frank Murray	19	18	1	Male	Black	Tennessee	Electrocution	
49	March 31, 1939	Dave Johnson	33	33	0	Male	Black	Louisiana	Hanging	
50	April 4, 1939	Hubert Harris	22	21	1	Male	Black	Tennessee	Electrocution	
51	April 7, 1939	Clarence Bracy	24	23	1	Male	Black	North Carolina	Gas chamber	
52	April 7, 1939	Batt DeJournette	38	37	1	Male	Black	North Carolina	Gas chamber	
53	April 7, 1939	Harry Price Williams	25	23	2	Male	Black	Virginia	Electrocution	
54	April 10, 1939	James Otho Martin	43	42	1	Male	White	Tennessee	Electrocution	
55	April 10, 1939	Joseph McKay	39	38	1	Male	Black	Tennessee	Electrocution	
56	April 10, 1939	James Willis Smith	40	38	2	Male	Black	Tennessee	Electrocution	
57	April 10, 1939	Harvey T. Nealy	19	18	1	Male	Black	Texas	Electrocution	
58	April 11, 1939	Edward Franklin Humphrey	52	50	2	Male	White	South Carolina	Electrocution	
59	April 14, 1939	Tom Williams	28	Unknown	Unknown	Male	Black	Alabama	Electrocution	
60	April 14, 1939	Elvin Lyle Wood	36	36	0	Male	White	Illinois	Electrocution	
61	April 15, 1939	Willie Williams	33	31	2	Male	Black	Tennessee	Electrocution	
62	April 15, 1939	Jesus Herrera	48	47	1	Male	Hispanic	Texas	Electrocution	
63	April 19, 1939	Harry Chapman	37	35	2	Male	White	Ohio	Electrocution	
64	April 19, 1939	Henry Dingledine	29	27	2	Male	White	Ohio	Electrocution	
65	April 19, 1939	Harry B. Dingledine	56	54	2	Male	White	Ohio	Electrocution	
66	April 23, 1939	Genaro Lugo	23	22	1	Male	Hispanic	Texas	Electrocution	
67	April 23, 1939	James Clifford Miles	22	20	2	Male	Black	Texas	Electrocution	
68	April 24, 1939	Ernest Miles Hipple	22	21	1	Male	White	Pennsylvania	Electrocution	
69	April 26, 1939	Harvey Lafayette Roush	48	47	1	Male	White	Ohio	Electrocution	
70	April 28, 1939	Archie Lee Short	27	26	1	Male	White	Arizona	Gas chamber	
71	April 28, 1939	Robert Kenyon	23	21	2	Male	White	Missouri	Gas chamber	
72	May 5, 1939	James Dixon	38	37	1	Male	Black	North Carolina	Gas chamber	
73	May 7, 1939	Bennie Randall	20	19	1	Male	Black	Texas	Electrocution	
74	May 9, 1939	Nick Babich	54	54	0	Male	White	Ohio	Electrocution	
75	May 12, 1939	Johnny Smith	30	27	3	Male	Black	Florida	Electrocution	
76	May 19, 1939	Fred Arnell	18	18	0	Male	Black	Arkansas	Electrocution	
77	May 19, 1939	Fred Dickerson	35	34	1	Male	White	Arkansas	Electrocution	
78	May 19, 1939	James Ervin	38	Unknown	Unknown	Male	Black	Texas	Electrocution	
79	May 21, 1939	Johnny Caesar	30	27	3	Male	Black	Texas	Electrocution	
80	May 26, 1939	Edward Lee Mattocks	21	Unknown	Unknown	Male	Black	North Carolina	Gas chamber	
81	June 3, 1939	Orelle J. Easton	26	25	1	Male	White	Indiana	Electrocution	
82	June 9, 1939	Ray Anderson	33	Unknown	Unknown	Male	Black	Alabama	Electrocution	
83	June 9, 1939	Charles W. White	51	Unknown	Unknown	Male	Black	Alabama	Electrocution	
84	June 9, 1939	Grady Tubbs	23	Unknown	Unknown	Male	Black	Alabama	Electrocution	
85	June 9, 1939	Joseph Frazier	22	21	1	Male	Black	Alabama	Electrocution	
86	June 9, 1939	Dave Burney	47	46	1	Male	Black	North Carolina	Gas chamber	
87	June 14, 1939	Willie Caldwell	23	21	2	Male	Black	Ohio	Electrocution	
88	June 16, 1939	Robert Nixon	19	18	1	Male	Black	Illinois	Electrocution	
89	June 16, 1939	Ed Alston	Unknown	Unknown	2	Male	Black	North Carolina	Gas chamber	
90	June 23, 1939	Harvey Lloyd Nelson	36	35	1	Male	White	Georgia	Electrocution	
91	June 23, 1939	James Reed Swain	20	18	2	Male	Black	Indiana	Electrocution	
92	June 23, 1939	Joseph Broughton	40	39	1	Male	Black	South Carolina	Electrocution	
93	June 26, 1939	Ladell Rhodes	26	25	1	Male	Black	Texas	Electrocution	
94	June 30, 1939	James Caruthers	23	25	5	Male	Black	Arkansas	Electrocution	
95	June 30, 1939	Bubbles Clayton	25	20	5	Male	Black	Arkansas	Electrocution	
96	June 30, 1939	Sylvester Williams	20	20	0	Male	Black	Arkansas	Electrocution	
97	June 30, 1939	Rafe Lee Walker	32	32	0	Male	Black	Texas	Electrocution	
98	July 7, 1939	Robert Sanders	37	37	0	Male	Black	Alabama	Electrocution	
99	July 7, 1939	J. D. Vaughan	25	Unknown	Unknown	Male	Black	Georgia	Electrocution	
100	July 7, 1939	Arvel P. Rice	20	19	1	Male	White	Kentucky	Electrocution	
101	July 7, 1939	Bricey Hammonds Sr.	24	24	0	Male	Native American	North Carolina	Gas chamber	
102	July 7, 1939	James Henderson	20	19	1	Male	Black	North Carolina	Gas chamber	
103	July 7, 1939	Alfred Caper	23	22	1	Male	Black	North Carolina	Gas chamber	
104	July 12, 1939	Pang Young	18	17	1	Male	Asian	Ohio	Electrocution	
105	July 14, 1939	Charles H. Smith	41	40	1	Male	White	Kentucky	Electrocution	
106	July 14, 1939	Howard Long	33	31	2	Male	White	New Hampshire	Hanging	
107	July 21, 1939	Claud David	25	24	1	Male	White	California	Gas chamber	
108	July 21, 1939	Jack Davis	47	46	1	Male	White	Kentucky	Electrocution	
109	July 25, 1939	Edward Higgins	26	26	0	Male	Black	Kentucky	Electrocution	
110	July 26, 1939	Arthur Barker	35	34	1	Male	White	Georgia	Electrocution	
111	July 28, 1939	Otis McGill	34	33	1	Male	White	South Carolina	Electrocution	
112	August 2, 1939	Wallace W. Green	22	21	1	Male	White	Massachusetts	Electrocution	
113	August 2, 1939	Walter St. Saveur	19	18	1	Male	White	Massachusetts	Electrocution	
114	August 4, 1939	Marion Hunter	25	24	1	Male	Black	Georgia	Electrocution	
115	August 4, 1939	Bernhard R. Leuch	48	46	2	Male	White	Washington	Hanging	
116	August 16, 1939	Adrian Hubert Miller	31	30	1	Male	White	Indiana	Electrocution	
117	August 18, 1939	Mack Jackson	23	Unknown	Unknown	Male	Black	Alabama	Electrocution	
118	August 18, 1939	Milton Williams	27	27	0	Male	Black	Arkansas	Electrocution	
119	August 24, 1939	Arthur Perry	24	22	2	Male	Black	New York	Electrocution	
120	August 28, 1939	Harley Evans	26	24	2	Male	White	Tennessee	Electrocution	
121	September 1, 1939	Arthur Morris	25	23	2	Male	Black	North Carolina	Gas chamber	
122	September 4, 1939	Harvey A. McGraw	20	20	0	Male	White	Florida	Electrocution	
123	September 8, 1939	William Gibson Smith	25	21	4	Male	White	California	Hanging	
124	September 15, 1939	Charles Augustine McLachlan	57	56	1	Male	White	California	Gas chamber	
125	September 15, 1939	Paul Leslie Buttry	39	37	2	Male	White	Washington	Hanging	
126	September 18, 1939	Earl Clayton Talbott	19	18	1	Male	White	Washington	Hanging	
127	September 22, 1939	Frank Conner	22	Unknown	Unknown	Male	Black	Arizona	Gas chamber	
128	September 22, 1939	James Franklin Godwin	21	20	1	Male	White	North Carolina	Gas chamber	
129	September 29, 1939	Angelo Agnes	33	31	2	Male	Black	Colorado	Gas chamber	
130	September 29, 1939	Pete Catalina	41	Unknown	Unknown	Male	White	Colorado	Gas chamber	
131	September 29, 1939	Clarence Sheffield	36	35	1	Male	Black	Georgia	Electrocution	
132	October 6, 1939	Charles Fain	26	35	1	Male	Black	North Carolina	Gas chamber	
133	October 6, 1939	Roy Wright	19	18	1	Male	White	Washington	Hanging	
134	October 13, 1939	Steven Cygan	35	24	11	Male	White	Illinois	Electrocution	
135	October 20, 1939	William Green	39	38	1	Male	Black	California	Gas chamber	
136	October 23, 1939	Paul Ferry	42	39	3	Male	White	Pennsylvania	Electrocution	
137	October 23, 1939	Willie Bailey	36	32	4	Male	Black	Pennsylvania	Electrocution	
138	October 23, 1939	Ira Bob Redmon	21	20	1	Male	Black	Pennsylvania	Electrocution	
139	October 24, 1939	Grover Cleveland Odom	51	50	1	Male	White	South Carolina	Electrocution	
140	October 25, 1939	Lafayette Williams	47	45	2	Male	White	Ohio	Electrocution	
141	October 27, 1939	Charles Price	28	25	3	Male	Black	Illinois	Electrocution	
142	October 27, 1939	Willie Richardson	19	19	0	Male	Black	North Carolina	Gas chamber	
143	October 28, 1939	Claude Bowser Jr.	22	21	1	Male	Black	North Carolina	Gas chamber	
144	October 30, 1939	Charles Golden	19	18	1	Male	Black	Pennsylvania	Electrocution	
145	October 30, 1939	Walter Tankard	31	30	1	Male	Black	Pennsylvania	Electrocution	
146	November 10, 1939	Nelson Charles	38	37	1	Male	Native American	Federal government	Hanging	
147	November 17, 1939	Sheppard Bruno	45	44	1	Male	Black	Georgia	Electrocution	
148	November 21, 1939	James Bivins	19	Unknown	Unknown	Male	Black	Georgia	Electrocution	
149	November 21, 1939	Burton Franklin Williamson	43	42	1	Male	White	Nevada	Gas chamber	
150	November 24, 1939	Raymond Williams	20	19	1	Male	Black	North Carolina	Gas chamber	
151	December 8, 1939	Ralph Verdell Carson	54	52	2	Male	White	Washington	Hanging	
152	December 9, 1939	Harry Leopold	28	27	1	Male	White	Colorado	Gas chamber	
153	December 15, 1939	Leamon Steele	Unknown	Unknown	3	Male	Black	Mississippi	Hanging	
154	December 15, 1939	Sam Swanson	27	27	0	Male	Black	Virginia	Electrocution	
155	December 16, 1939	Frank Salazar	24	23	1	Male	Hispanic	Texas	Electrocution	
156	December 18, 1939	James Fuller	25	25	0	Male	Black	Pennsylvania	Electrocution	
157	December 18, 1939	Fletcher LeGrand	22	22	0	Male	Black	Pennsylvania	Electrocution	
158	December 19, 1939	Harry Lacy	42	38	4	Male	Black	Texas	Electrocution	
159	December 21, 1939	Theodore Maselkiewicz	53	52	1	Male	White	New York	Electrocution	
160	December 21, 1939	Everett McDonald	41	Unknown	Unknown	Male	Black	New York	Electrocution	
161	December 21, 1939	Anton Myslivec	54	53	1	Male	White	New York	Electrocution	
162	December 30, 1939	Warren Lee Simpson	54	52	2	Male	White	Montana	Hanging	

== Demographics ==
Gender
Male	162	100%
Female	0	0%
Ethnicity
Black	80	49%
White	75	46%
Hispanic	3	2%
Native American	2	1%
Arab	1	1%
Asian	1	1%
State
North Carolina	16	10%
New York	15	9%
Texas	12	7%
Alabama	10	6%
Ohio	10	6%
Pennsylvania	10	6%
South Carolina	10	6%
Tennessee	10	6%
Georgia	8	5%
Kentucky	8	5%
Arkansas	7	4%
Washington	5	3%
California	4	2%
Colorado	4	2%
Florida	4	2%
Illinois	4	2%
Virginia	4	2%
Indiana	3	2%
Arizona	2	1%
Louisiana	2	1%
Massachusetts	2	1%
Mississippi	2	1%
Missouri	2	1%
Nevada	2	1%
District of Columbia	1	1%
Federal government	1	1%
Maryland	1	1%
Montana	1	1%
New Hampshire	1	1%
Oregon	1	1%
Method
Electrocution	118	73%
Gas chamber	30	19%
Hanging	14	9%
Month
January	15	9%
February	15	9%
March	19	12%
April	22	14%
May	9	6%
June	17	10%
July	14	9%
August	9	6%
September	11	7%
October	14	9%
November	5	3%
December	12	7%
Age
Unknown	3	2%
10–19	13	8%
20–29	77	48%
30–39	35	22%
40–49	22	14%
50–59	11	7%
60–69	1	1%
Total	162	100%

== Executions in recent years ==
Number of executions
1940	124
1939	162
1938	188
Total	474

Preceded by 1938	List of people executed in the United States in 1939	Succeeded by 1940
