= Cash Corner =

Road intersection in South Portland, Maine, U.S.

- Neighborhood in South Portland, Maine
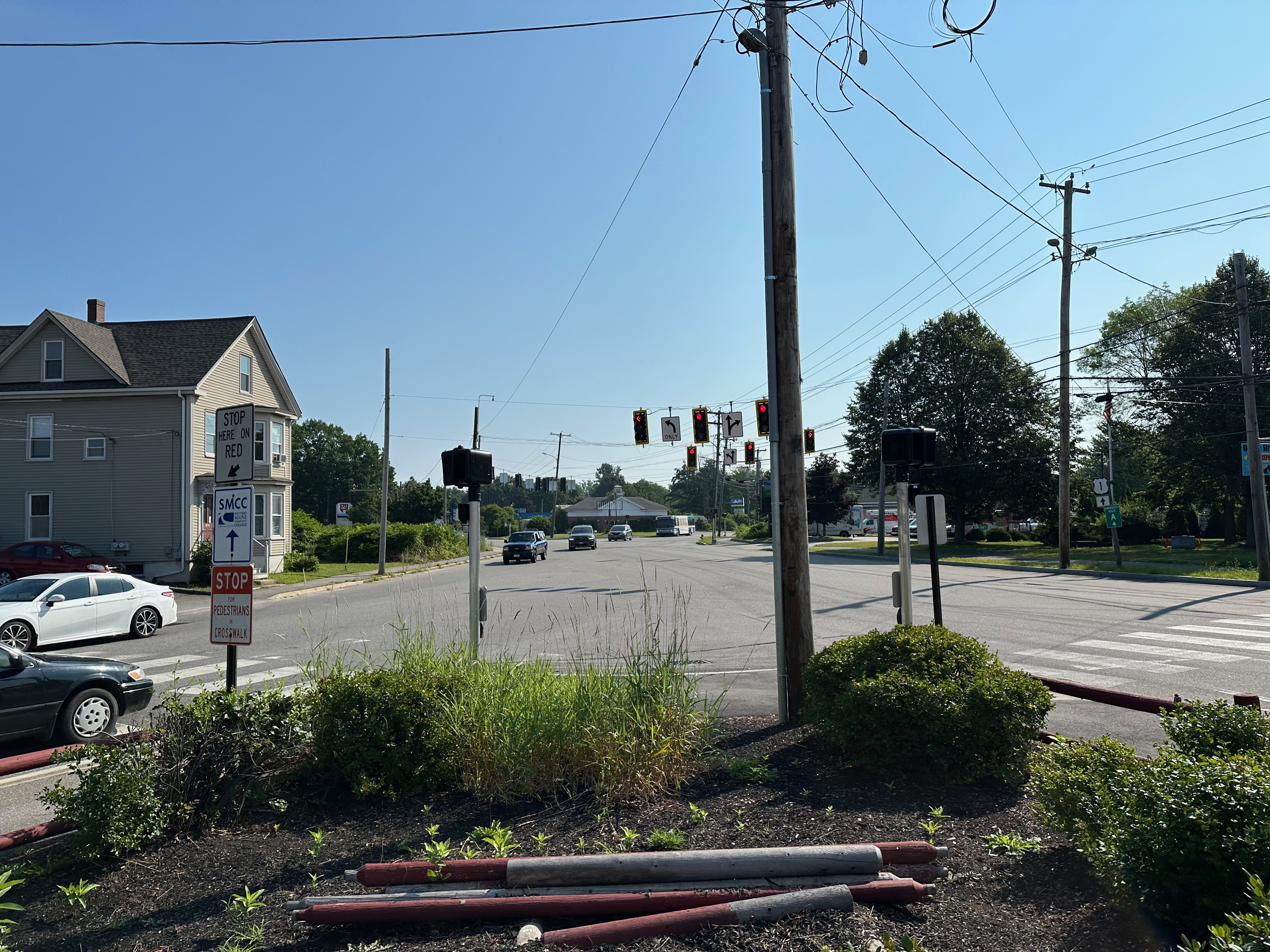
- Interactive map of Cash Corner
- Coordinates: 43.630°N 70.292°W
- Country: United States
- State: Maine
- County: Cumberland
- City: South Portland

Cash Corner is a neighborhood of South Portland, Maine, United States. Centered around the intersection of Broadway and Main Street, it is named for merchant brothers A. J. Cash and George Washington Cash, who had businesses there in the 19th century. Up until 1895, Cash Corner was part of Cape Elizabeth.

Broadway was formerly named Brown Street in this section.

Maine Memorial Company has been in existence near Cash Corner since 1919.
