= Sebetha Lee Jenkins =

American college president

10th President of Jarvis Christian University
- In office January 1, 1991 – December 31, 2008
- Preceded by: Charles Berry (acting)
- Succeeded by: Cornell Thomas

Personal details
- Born: 1939 (age 86–87)
- Education: Jackson State University (BA); Delta State University (MEd); Mississippi State University (EdD)

Academic work
- Discipline: Educational Administration
- Institutions: Coahoma Junior College; Mississippi State University; University of Akron; Jarvis Christian University

Sebetha Lee Jenkins (born 1939) is the 10th President of Jarvis Christian University, and the first woman to hold that role. Jenkins previously worked at the University of Akron and Mississippi State University, specializing in minority affairs, educational administration, and community college education.

== Early life and education ==
Sebetha Lee was born in 1939 in the town of Learned, Mississippi, to Eunice Nelson Lee and Thomas Lee. Eunice was an elementary school principal for 42 years, as well as a community activist, church pianist, seamstress, and counselor. Sebetha was named after her grandmother and great-aunt, and the name Sebetha is a combination of their names: Seretha and Elbetha.

Mississippi was heavily segregated while Jenkins grew up, and she later wrote that she "lived in a segregated world" and "one way to escape the treatment of inequality meant preparation and for me preparation meant getting an education; a good education." She was inspired to become a school administrator by her mother, who was a principal, and stated that when she was a child she would play school and act out the person in charge. Jenkins grew up middle-class and was encouraged to read, ask questions, and pursue educational opportunities.

Jenkins attended Jackson State University, earning bachelor's degrees in English and French in 1960. She participated in the Alpha Mu honor society and Phi Delta Kappa. Her mother advocated for her to go to graduate school, but Mississippi prohibited Black students from attending graduate programs in the state and would have paid her to attend school elsewhere. Jenkins turned down this option in 1960.

Mississippi's graduate programs began to be desegregated via legal challenges, and after working for some time in education, Jenkins was able to attend graduate studies in the state. Jenkins had felt burnt out from teaching English, struggling with the tension between standard grading needs and promoting students' freedom to express themselves and experiment. Jenkins went back to school and earned a Master of Education in English in 1970 from Delta State University. Later, she pursued her doctorate in educational administration and community college education from Mississippi State University. She completed her degree in 1978, with her dissertation titled "The Perceptions of Selected Administrators and Faculty toward Faculty Inservice Training Programs in Junior Colleges of Mississippi." She wanted to study Black women in higher education administration, but her advisor believed there were still too few at that time for Jenkins to study the topic well.

== Career ==
=== Teaching ===
Jenkins became a high school teacher after she graduated college in 1960. She taught English and French in Clarksdale, Mississippi for two years, then moving to Madison County for two years, and Hinds County, where she was born, for two more. During this time, she earned fellowships to train at North Carolina State and Loyola University.

In 1966, she transitioned to working as a program analyst for Coahoma Opportunities, and began teaching English the next year for Coahoma Junior College. She remained there until 1975, and was department head from 1973 to 1975, until she began her Ed.D.

=== Civil rights and minority affairs ===
For the next three years, during her studies, Jenkins worked as the Title IX contact for the state of Mississippi. She frequently traveled around the state, helping its 80 school districts apply and interpret civil rights directives from the federal government.

In 1978, Jenkins became Coordinator of Title III Programs, Institutional Research, and Affirmative Action at Coahoma Junior College. The next year, she moved back to Mississippi State University, as the assistant to the Vice President and Director of Minority Affairs from 1979 to 1985. She was the first Black administrator at Mississippi State University. From 1985 to 1986, she was an assistant professor in educational administration and community college education. That year, she also was promoted to Assistant to the President.

On August 1, 1986, Jenkins was appointed as Assistant to the President and Director of Minority Affairs for the University of Akron. As Director of Minority Affairs, she oversaw the university's Black Cultural Center and its Office of Affirmative Action and Equal Employment Opportunity. She was also the first Black administrator at the university. The Office of Minority Affairs was new during this time, as the university's president, William V. Muse, had been seeking ways to increase the enrollment and hiring of members of minority groups. During a 1989 progress report, the university stated that this strategy was working, and a key part was Jenkins's new grass-roots outreach programs. One of her successful strategies was to pull in local churches and families, building relationships with Black ministers so they could connect Black parents to the university.

During this time, she was a board member for the Arthritis Foundation, Akron Community Service Center and Urban League, and Martin Luther King Jr. Festac Institute.

=== College president ===
Jenkins was appointed President of Jarvis Christian College on January 1, 1991. She was the 10th president, and first woman to hold the position. Jarvis is a historically black college affiliated with the Christian Church (Disciples of Christ). Jenkins was the first Black woman to be president of any higher education institution associated with that denomination. In 2001, the New Crisis counted Jenkins among only 27 Black women who were presidents of the U.S.'s 2,320 four-year colleges. Jenkins served as president for 17 years, retiring December 31, 2008.

When Jenkins joined the college in 1991, Jarvis was facing a budget crisis. The college was adjusting to the loss of its campus oil wells and their revenues, which had dwindled after oil prices crashed in the 1980s. By 1996, the college received about $250,000 of its $12 million annual budget from oil and gas revenue, which was a large drop from oil's $2 million annual revenue in the 1970s. Jenkins had to immediately lay off 40 of the college's 170 employees, and described this period as "a tough time." By 1993, the college had balanced its budget, and was planning to start its first capital fundraising campaign, for $10 million over the next five years.

Jenkins also started to pivot on how the college advertised itself: highlighting, rather than downplaying, the campus's remote setting. The college is located in Hawkins, Texas, which had a population of 1,300 in 1996 and only a few shops, with the nearest mall 20 miles away. Jenkins was concerned that students were surprised by this remoteness upon their arrival, with some leaving after a few weeks. She emphasized that they should first understand the campus environment: coming for the nature, the space to spread out, and the academics, and being prepared for the remoteness. Jenkins oversaw large increases in student enrollment. By 1996, the freshman class size jumped from 150 to 326 students, raising the college's total size to 530 students. In 2005, Jenkins had a goal of increasing enrollment to 1,000 full-time students by 2010, and the college had begun building a new dormitory to fit more students. In 2007, the USDA's Rural Development Program presented the college with $13.69 million to aid in renovations and build another new dormitory, which would fit 300 students and include learning spaces.

During these years, students felt she had a busy schedule and was often away from campus. Some wished she was more involved, but others appreciated her time spent promoting the college, because it had attracted more money and students and resulted in significant improvements.

Jenkins oversaw two reaccreditations with the Southern Association of Colleges and Schools, several capital campaigns and renovation and modernization rounds, new programs for service career preparation and outreach, and new legacy and awards programs. During her tenure, student enrollment increased and alumni involvement and donations rose.

In 1994, President Clinton announced Jenkins' appointment to the President's Board of Advisors on Historically Black Colleges and Universities. The board first met with Clinton in 1995, where they talked about increasing funding for HBCUs via Title III and a 1993 executive order, and changing financial aid practices so more students could attend college. After the meeting, Jenkins stated that she felt optimistic about federal funding levels, as long as Clinton stayed willing to maintain his funding commitments. The subtext here was that Republicans were motivated to cut this funding at the time, and the previous Bush administration, as well as the current Republican-led Congress, had signaled at changes to HBCU funding.

In 2002, Jenkins was named the inaugural chair of the United Negro College Fund Presidents Council, for a two-year term. Her first meeting of the Council was hosted in Jacksonville, Florida, in October 2002.

During this time, Jenkins also provided consulting services for other organizations, focusing on topics related to education, equal opportunities and rights, due process, and youth issues. She named some of these services as: "No Failure Needs to be Final", "Achieving Against the Odds", "Black Achievements", "Being Proud", "Blacks Helping Blacks", "How Do You Spell Success?", "Recruitment and Retention of Minority Students", "The Retention of the Black Student" and "Meeting the Educational Needs of Minorities: Towards the Year 2000".

== Awards and honors ==
In 1980, Jenkins was honored as one of the Most Outstanding Women in Higher Education for the State of Mississippi, and the Mary Holmes Junior College granted her the Women's Equity Award. In 1982, she earned the Achievement Award from Zeta Phi Beta and Phi Beta Sigma.

Jenkins earned many awards from Mississippi State University during her time there. She was given the Outstanding Leadership Award in 1982 and 1984. In 1985, that university honored her as the Most Outstanding Administrative Professional Woman, from the President's Commission on the Status of Women, and in 1986, the university gave Jenkins the Most Outstanding Educational Leadership Award.

In 1996, Jenkins was inducted into the National Black College Alumni Hall of Fame for her contributions in the field of education. That year, she was also inducted into the Black Women of Texas Hall of Fame.

In 2001, Jenkins delivered Eureka College's commencement address, and was given an honorary doctorate of humane letters.

In 2023, Jenkins received the Alexander Campbell Distinguished Service Award from the Christian Church (Disciples of Christ) for her lifetime of achievement in church-related higher education work. The church's Board of Directors of Higher Education and Leadership Ministries unanimously chose her to receive the honor. The press release stated that "Dr. Jenkins-Booker has provided significant and unusually committed service to the cause of church-related higher education."

== Personal life ==
Jenkins married Rufus Jenkins in 1962 and they later divorced. The pair had one daughter, Jennifer Arlnice Jenkins-Diotallevi, in 1966 while they lived in Jackson, Mississippi. Jenkins-Diotallevi later pursued a PhD in Behavioral Pharmacology and became a professor. She died in 2022.

Jenkins had later relationships with Clyde Leggette Sr., another college administrator, and Charles Booker.
