= W. Sherman Savage =

American historian (1890–1981)

William Sherman Savage
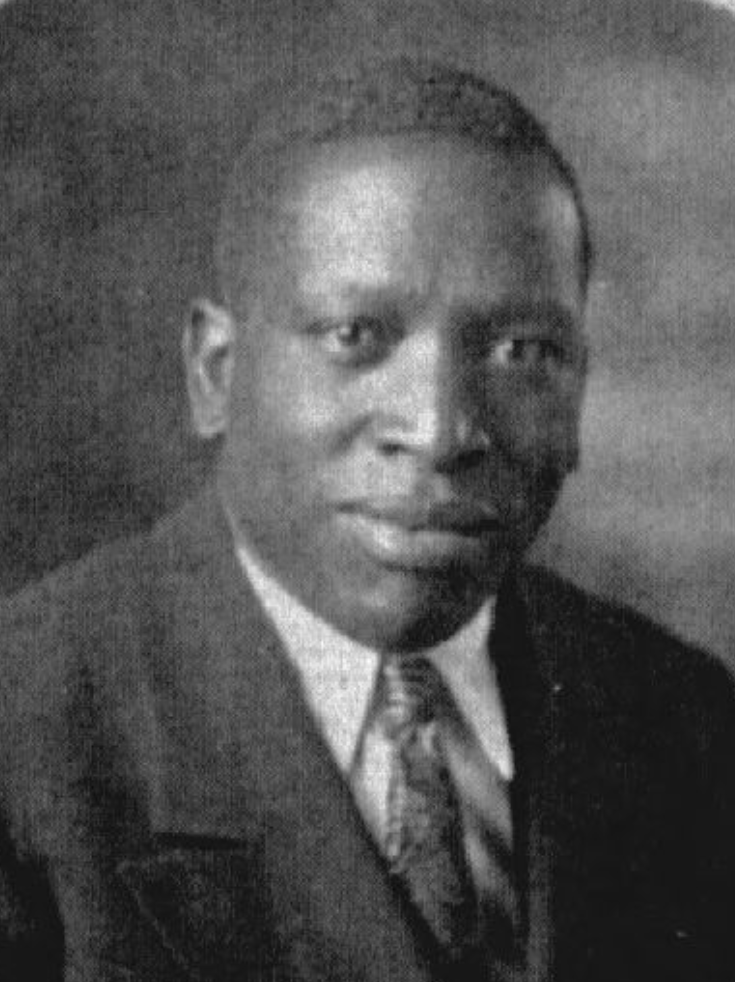
- Savage, photo published in 1930
- Born: March 7, 1890; Eastern Shore of Virginia, U.S.
- Died: May 23, 1981 (aged 91); Los Angeles, California, U.S.
- Education: Howard University (AB); University of Oregon (MA); Ohio State University (PhD)
- Occupations: Historian, educator, author
- Employer: Lincoln University (Missouri)
- Title: Professor of History
- Spouse: Roena Muckelroy Savage

William Sherman Savage (March 7, 1890 – May 23, 1981), generally known as W. Sherman Savage, was an American historian, professor of history at Lincoln University in Missouri, and author of Blacks in the West, a foundational survey of the subject. A specialist in African American history, he also taught at Jarvis Christian College in Texas and California State College, Los Angeles. Savage was the first African American to graduate from the University of Oregon or receive a doctorate from Ohio State University.

== Early life and education ==
Born into a family of farmers in Wattsville on the Eastern Shore of Virginia on March 7, 1890, Savage left school at age 11 to help his family on the farm. At age 17, he completed his elementary education at Virginia Union College in Richmond, Virginia, and earned his high school diploma from Morgan College in Baltimore, Maryland. He earned his AB degree from Howard University in 1917, his MA degree in history from the University of Oregon in 1926, and his PhD in history from Ohio State University in 1934.

Savage was the first African American to graduate from the University of Oregon and the first to earn a doctorate from Ohio State. He initially attended the University of Kansas for two summers, and the only reason he transferred was because Oregon charged only six dollars a quarter for tuition. As the only Black person attending the University of Oregon or living in the city of Eugene, he faced racial discrimination and struggled to find a landlord who would rent to an African American. Savage wrote his master's thesis on the topic of "Abolitionist Literature in the Mails, 1830–1836" and rewrote his dissertation into a monograph entitled The Controversy over the Distribution of Abolition Literature, 1830–1860, published in 1938.

== Academic career ==
After teaching high school in North Carolina, Mississippi, and Oklahoma, Savage joined the faculty of Lincoln University in Missouri in 1921. He taught at Lincoln for thirty-nine years, taking leaves of absence as necessary to complete his postgraduate education. By the 1930s, he had become interested in the history of African Americans in the western United States, publishing a dozen scholarly articles on the Buffalo Soldiers and Black pioneers and educators in the West, primarily in African American history journals such as The Journal of Negro History, the Negro History Bulletin, and the Journal of Negro Education. In 1976, Greenwood Press published his book Blacks in the West, a foundational survey of Black influence on the Old West. Reviewers praised the book as an important synthesis—a "lasting contribution to readers' understanding of racial and regional history," as one reviewer put it—though some voiced a desire for deeper analysis.

After retiring from Lincoln University in 1960, Savage moved to Hawkins, Texas, where he chaired the history and social sciences department at Jarvis Christian College. From 1966 to 1970, he held an appointment as a visiting professor of history at California State College, Los Angeles, and concluded his career as a researcher at the Huntington Library alongside his friend and fellow historian of the American West Ray Allen Billington.

== Personal life and death ==
Savage wed Roena Muckelroy Savage, a choir director and professor of voice, in 1927. They had daughters Eloise (born 1936) and Inez (born 1939).

He died in Los Angeles on May 23, 1981, at the age of 91. The Huntington Library holds his papers, spanning approximately 1950 to 1981.

== Publications ==
=== Books ===
- Savage, W. Sherman (1976). Blacks in the West. Westport, CT: Greenwood Press. ISBN 978-0-8371-8775-4 – via Internet Archive.
- Savage, W. Sherman (1939). The History of Lincoln University. Jefferson City, MO: New Day Press Printers, published under the direction of Lincoln University – via HathiTrust.
- Savage, W. Sherman (1938). The Controversy over the Distribution of Abolition Literature, 1830–1860. New York: The Association for the Study of Negro Life and History – via HathiTrust.

=== Articles ===
- Savage, W. Sherman (1963). "George Washington of Centralia Washington". Negro History Bulletin. 27 (2): 44–47. ISSN 0028-2529. JSTOR 44175463.
- Savage, W. Sherman (1962). "The Negro in Politics Kansas and Iowa". Negro History Bulletin. 25 (5): 110–113. ISSN 0028-2529. JSTOR 44215698.
- Savage, W. Sherman (1958). "The Negro Pioneer in the State of Washington". Negro History Bulletin. 21 (4): 93–95. ISSN 0028-2529. JSTOR 44213178.
- Savage, W. S. (1953). "The Influence of William Alexander Leidesdorff on the History of California". The Journal of Negro History. 38 (3): 322–332. doi:10.2307/2715738. ISSN 0022-2992. JSTOR 2715738. S2CID 150288502.
- Savage, W. Sherman (1951). "The Role of Negro Soldiers in Protecting the Indian Territory From Intruders". The Journal of Negro History. 36 (1): 25–34. doi:10.2307/2715775. ISSN 0022-2992. JSTOR 2715775. S2CID 150192435.
- Savage, W. Sherman (1946). "Early Negro Education in the Pacific Coast States". The Journal of Negro Education. 15 (2): 134–139. doi:10.2307/2965951. ISSN 0022-2984. JSTOR 2965951.
- Savage, W. Sherman (1945). "The Negro on the Mining Frontier". The Journal of Negro History. 30 (1): 30–46. doi:10.2307/2715267. ISSN 0022-2992. JSTOR 2715267. S2CID 150042748.
- Savage, W. Sherman (1943). "The Contest Over Slavery Between Illinois and Missouri". The Journal of Negro History. 28 (3): 311–325. doi:10.2307/2714911. ISSN 0022-2992. JSTOR 2714911. S2CID 149481588.
- Chavis, John; Lane, Lunsford; Savage, W. Sherman (1940). "The Influence of John Chavis and Lunsford Lane on the History of North Carolina". The Journal of Negro History. 25 (1): 14–24. doi:10.2307/2714398. ISSN 0022-2992. JSTOR 2714398. S2CID 149664573.
- Savage, W. Sherman (1940). "The Negro in the Westward Movement". The Journal of Negro History. 25 (4): 531–539. doi:10.2307/2715141. ISSN 0022-2992. JSTOR 2715141. S2CID 150149222.
- Savage, W. Sherman (1937). "Legal Provisions for Negro Schools in Missouri from 1890 to 1935". The Journal of Negro History. 22 (3): 335–344. doi:10.2307/2714512. ISSN 0022-2992. JSTOR 2714512. S2CID 149836489.
- Savage, W. Sherman (1928). "Abolitionist Literature in the Mails, 1835–1836". The Journal of Negro History. 13 (2): 150–184. doi:10.2307/2713960. ISSN 0022-2992. JSTOR 2713960. S2CID 149536150.
- Savage, W. Sherman (1928). "The Negro in the History of the Pacific Northwest". The Journal of Negro History. 13 (3): 255–264. doi:10.2307/2713979. ISSN 0022-2992. JSTOR 2713979. S2CID 149861615.
