= Robert Nixon (criminal) =

American serial killer

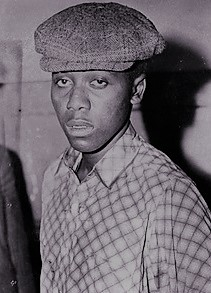
- Robert Nixon, pictured following his arrest
- Born: Robert Nixon; July 19, 1919; Tallulah, Louisiana, U.S.
- Died: June 16, 1939 (aged 19); Cook County Jail, Chicago, Illinois, U.S.
- Cause of death: Execution by electrocution
- Other name: The Brick Moron
- Conviction: Murder
- Penalty: Death

Details
- Victims: 3–5
- Span of crimes: 1937–1938
- Country: United States
- States: California and Illinois
- Date apprehended: May 28, 1938

Robert Nixon (July 19, 1919 – June 16, 1939) was an American serial killer, born in the small town of Tallulah, Louisiana, who confessed to five murders and multiple assaults, including the Los Angeles "brick bat murders" of 1937. Depicted with racist imagery in the mainstream press after his arrest, he was given the nickname the "Brick Moron" as he killed his victims with bricks and was depicted as dimwitted.

Convicted of murder, he was executed in Chicago in 1939. Nixon served, in part, as the basis of the character of Bigger Thomas in Richard Wright's 1940 social protest novel Native Son.

== Los Angeles murders ==
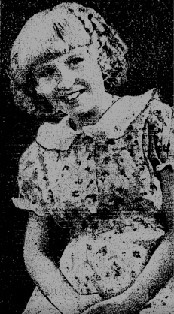
Marguerite Estelle Worden.

On April 4, 1937, Edna A. Worden (age 48) and her 12-year-old daughter, Marguerite Estelle, a junior high school student, were murdered in their apartment in the neighborhood of Bunker Hill, Los Angeles. Their bodies were discovered the next day by the manager of their building, the Astoria Apartments, which was located next to the Angel's Flight stairs. Worden and her daughter were sexually assaulted and murdered with a brick that still had mortar attached to it. Los Angeles detectives linked the crime to the rape-murder of 20-year-old Rose Valdez, a young mother who was killed on March 2 as her baby slept in the same room in its crib.

The police began searching for an African-American man who had been implicated in three similar assaults. On January 25, Mrs. H. W. Koll was attacked by an African-American man wielding a brick in Monte Sano Hospital. On February 3, a black perpetrator fractured the skull of Elizabeth Reis with a brick, in her hotel room. On March 28, Zoe Damrell was attacked and nearly murdered in her home by an African-American assailant wielding a brick; Damrell's assailant matched the description of a potential assailant seen lurking by Valdez's home before her murder.

== Chicago arrest ==
Using the alias Thomas Crosby, Nixon had survived in Los Angeles by petty theft, racking up arrests for shoplifting and purse-snatching. He was also suspected of auto-theft. He returned to Chicago, where another brick-killing was committed.

On the night of May 27, 1938, Florence Johnson, the Caucasian wife of a Chicago fireman, had been slain by multiple blows on the head with a brick, as she fought off burglars. Her sister, who shared her apartment in Chicago's North Kenwood District on the South Side and slept in another room, saw two assailants leave the house. Within hours, Nixon was arrested (on the 28th), picked up because of blood on his clothes and scratched hands.

== Confession ==
Nixon blamed his accomplice, 19-year-old Earl Hicks, for Johnson's murder, which happened when the two were burglarizing her apartment. Hicks, who also was under arrest, put the blame for Johnson's murder solely on Nixon. Hicks told the police that Nixon had struck Johnson after she woke up and began screaming.

Nixon confessed to another brick murder, that of 24-year-old Florence Thompson Castle, a White nightclub hostess, in her hotel room in 1936, which she shared with her seven-year-old son. At the time of the Castle killing, Nixon had written "Black Legion Game" on the dressing-table mirror with lipstick to implicate the Black Legion, a domestic terrorist group at "war" with Catholics, Jews, Negroes, aliens and Communists."

Nixon had inadvertently left behind his fingerprints, which implicated him in the murder. After the Castle slaying, he and Hicks had left Chicago and wound up in Los Angeles, where he took an assumed name. Faced with the evidence, Nixon told police he had been the person who had written on the mirror.

According to the African American newspaper The Chicago Defender, which was skeptical about the arrest and subsequent "confession" to the Johnson murder (the newspaper always put the word confession in quotation marks), the Chicago police had alternately beaten Nixon, and offered him sweets and strawberry soda pop. The Defender characterized the white press' coverage of the Nixon case as "lurid and inflammatory."

=== Fingerprint evidence ===
The Los Angeles police, learning of the brick murderer caught in Chicago, sent on fingerprints lifted from a milk bottle at the Wordens' apartment to the Chicago Police Department. The modus operandi of the crime and the fact that Nixon previously lived at 803 South Central Avenue, Los Angeles indicated a connection to the brick bat murders. Nixon initially denied having any connection with those killings, but the Los Angeles Police's fingerprint evidence was decisive. After Los Angeles Police Chief James Davis announced they had a positive identification with the brick bat murders from Nixon's prints (which proved that Thomas Crosby was Robert Nixon), he admitted to killing the Wordens, mother and child.

Having confessed to the Castle killing, Nixon was taken by the Chicago police to the scene of the crime, Chicago's Devonshire Hotel. Despite a crowd of angry whites, some determined to lynch Nixon, who were held back by a cordon of 20 police officers, Nixon reenacted how he climbed into Castle's fifth floor room from a fire escape.

Nixon was held incommunicado in police custody for two weeks during which he confessed to raping and murdering nursing student Anna Kuchta in 1937, and assaulting three other Chicago women. He ultimately confessed to four murders in all, two in Chicago and two in Los Angeles. He continued to maintain that Hicks had killed Johnson with a brick at his trial. However, during his trial and in his appeal to the Illinois Supreme Court he denied these confessions and claimed he had been severely beaten and abused by police. No fingerprint evidence linked him to Florence Johnson's death, nor did any blood samples. Witness testimony was also unreliable and contradictory.

== Depiction by press ==
The apparent senselessness of the crimes and the depiction of Robert Nixon as a dim-witted African American led the press to nickname the murderer "The Brick Moron." Press coverage also called Nixon a "slow witted colored youth" and "colored moron." The press reported that the Chicago Police had contacted the sheriff back in Nixon's hometown of Tallulah, Louisiana, and the sheriff had reported back that Nixon had been a pickpocket and a thief, declaring: "nothing but death will cure him." The Chicago slayings were depicted as sex crimes, although sexual assault had not been a factor in the Windy City murders.

In one notorious story, a Chicago Tribune story published on June 5, 1938, entitled "BRICK SLAYER IS LIKENED TO JUNGLE BEAST", used racist tropes in depicting Nixon when the police took him to the Devonshire Hotel to reenact Florence Thompson Castle's murder. The author of the piece, Charles Leaville, likened Nixon to the "missing link" in human evolution.

Describing Nixon climbing up the hotel to the fire escape, Leaville quoted a cop: "'Look at him go,' says a policeman. 'Just like an ape.'"

In the first paragraphs of his piece, Leaville declared: "civilization has left Nixon practically untouched. His hunched shoulders and long, sinewy arms that dangle almost to his knees; his out-thrust head and catlike tread all suggest the animal," evoking simian imagery common in the mainstream press at the time.

Leaville summed up his description of Nixon:

He is very black-- almost pure Negro. His physical characteristics suggest an earlier link in the species.

Along with the depiction of Nixon in the tropes of the dangerous Black Buck, the press ran stories on Florence Johnson, depicting her as a mother of two. Newspapers ran photos of her children, bearing such headlines as "Orphaned by Crime." The stories exacerbated racial tensions in Chicago, and the murder and resulting press frightened the white residents of Johnson's North Kenwood District and the adjacent Kenwood neighborhood, triggering white flight from the once-elite areas that now bordered black districts.

== Accomplice ==
Robert Nixon sometimes had an accomplice to his acts, Earl Hicks (a.k.a. Howard Jones Green). Hicks was sent from Chicago to Los Angeles and taken to the Wordens' former room at the Astoria Apartments. He admitted to the L.A. police that he beat 12-year-old Marguerite on the head with the butt of a pistol, but denied taking part in a sexual assault or using a brick. Hicks said that he and Nixon stole eight dollars from the Wordens (equivalent to approximately $179 in 2025). In addition, he confessed to attacking Zoe Damrell, for which he was sentenced to five-years-to-life.

Nixon's defense in the Florence Johnson murder was to claim that it was Hicks who wielded the brick that killed her. The defense was not effective as the Illinois Supreme Court held that under the rules of felony murder, both burglars were responsible for the murder. The law holds both culpable: The perpetrator of a murder and any accomplice who does not actually commit or partake in the killing during the commission of another crime are equally as guilty of the murder.

On January 27, 1939, Hicks was sentenced to 14 years in prison after he pleaded guilty to the charge of murder in regards to Johnson's death. This occurred 5 months before Nixon was sentenced to death.

== Richard Wright ==
As Richard Wright wrote his novel Native Son in Chicago, the local papers were full of the Brick Moron story. In his essay "How Bigger Was Born", Wright admitted to copying details from press stories of the Robert Nixon case.

Any Negro who has lived in the North or the South knows that times without number he has heard of some Negro boy being picked up on the streets and carted off to jail and charged with "rape." This thing happens so often that to my mind it had become a representative symbol of the Negro's uncertain position in America. Never for a second was I in doubt as to what kind of social reality or dramatic situation I'd put Bigger in, what kind of test-tube life I'd set up to evoke his deepest reactions. Life had made the plot over and over again, to the extent that I knew it by heart. So frequently do these acts recur that when I was halfway through the first draft of Native Son a case paralleling Bigger's flared forth in the newspapers of Chicago. (Many of the newspaper items and some of the incidents in Native Son are but fictionalized versions of the Robert Nixon case and rewrites of news stories from the Chicago Tribune.)

== Execution ==
Robert Nixon was convicted of the murder of Florence Johnson and sentenced to death. He was executed in the electric chair at the Cook County Jail on June 16, 1939.

== See also ==
- List of serial killers in the United States
- List of homicides in Illinois
- List of people executed by electrocution
- List of people executed in the United States in 1939

== Sources ==
Life and Death Of and In the Astoria, On Bunker Hill: A Lost Neighborhood Found Elizabeth Dale. Robert Nixon and Police Torture in Chicago, 1871–1971. DeKalb: Northern Illinois University Press, 2016.
