= List of people executed in the United States in 1940 =

One hundred and twenty-four people, all male, were executed in the United States in 1940, eighty-four by electrocution, twenty-two by gas chamber, and eighteen by hanging.

== List of people executed in the United States in 1940 ==
No.	Date of execution	Name	Age of person			Gender	Ethnicity	State	Method	Ref.
No.	Date of execution	Name	At execution	At offense	Age difference	Gender	Ethnicity	State	Method	Ref.
1	January 4, 1940	Anselmo Abreu	41	Unknown	Unknown	Male	Hispanic	New York	Electrocution	
2	January 5, 1940	James Clifton Abdell	42	41	1	Male	White	Virginia	Electrocution	
3	January 10, 1940	Clyde Wills	27	26	1	Male	White	Tennessee	Electrocution	
4	January 11, 1940	Demetrius Gula	28	26	2	Male	White	New York	Electrocution	
5	January 11, 1940	Joseph S. Sacoda	28	26	2	Male	White	New York	Electrocution	
6	January 18, 1940	Sidney Markman	22	20	2	Male	White	New York	Electrocution	
7	January 19, 1940	James Charles Jr.	24	23	1	Male	Black	Arkansas	Electrocution	
8	January 19, 1940	J. Glenn Maxwell	49	48	1	Male	Black	North Carolina	Gas chamber	
9	January 19, 1940	Clarence Rogers	26	25	1	Male	Black	North Carolina	Gas chamber	
10	January 19, 1940	Frank Dash Jr.	21	20	1	Male	Black	South Carolina	Electrocution	
11	January 26, 1940	John Henry McCann	63	62	1	Male	Black	Virginia	Electrocution	
12	January 29, 1940	Cleveland Holloway	36	Unknown	Unknown	Male	Black	Mississippi	Hanging	
13	January 29, 1940	Benjamin Ginyard	27	27	0	Male	Black	Pennsylvania	Electrocution	
14	February 9, 1940	James Fisher	27	27	0	Male	Black	Georgia	Electrocution	
15	February 9, 1940	Joe Mathis	27	27	0	Male	Black	Georgia	Electrocution	
16	February 15, 1940	Franklin Wilbert Jenner	22	21	1	Male	White	New York	Electrocution	
17	February 15, 1940	John Kulka	24	22	2	Male	White	New York	Electrocution	
18	February 15, 1940	Bertal Jerome Thingstead	29	27	2	Male	White	New York	Electrocution	
19	February 16, 1940	Calvin Tucker	24	Unknown	Unknown	Male	Black	Alabama	Electrocution	
20	February 16, 1940	James Charles Williams	33	32	1	Male	White	California	Gas chamber	
21	February 16, 1940	Nathaniel Bryant	18	17	1	Male	Black	North Carolina	Gas chamber	
22	February 16, 1940	William Young	23	22	1	Male	Black	North Carolina	Gas chamber	
23	February 26, 1940	William Kelly	33	31	2	Male	Black	Pennsylvania	Electrocution	
24	February 26, 1940	Andrew Schurtz	47	47	0	Male	White	Pennsylvania	Electrocution	
25	March 1, 1940	Roy Mannon	35	34	1	Male	White	Oklahoma	Electrocution	
26	March 15, 1940	Lonnie Avery	32	26	6	Male	Black	Alabama	Electrocution	
27	March 15, 1940	Neil Anderson	23	21	2	Male	White	California	Gas chamber	
28	March 15, 1940	Alvin Kenton	23	22	1	Male	White	Maryland	Hanging	
29	March 15, 1940	Thomas Sanchez	40	39	1	Male	Hispanic	Maryland	Hanging	
30	March 15, 1940	Robert Williams	19	17	2	Male	Black	North Carolina	Gas chamber	
31	March 15, 1940	A. C. Mobley	35	33	2	Male	Black	Tennessee	Electrocution	
32	March 18, 1940	James Warner Rickman	22	20	2	Male	White	Texas	Electrocution	
33	March 22, 1940	William L. Mims	38	36	2	Male	Black	Georgia	Electrocution	
34	March 28, 1940	Walter Dworecki	43	42	1	Male	White	New Jersey	Electrocution	
35	March 29, 1940	Mack Jackson	28	Unknown	Unknown	Male	Black	Alabama	Electrocution	
36	March 29, 1940	David Williams	22	Unknown	Unknown	Male	Black	Alabama	Electrocution	
37	March 29, 1940	Herman Bell	23	22	1	Male	Black	Alabama	Electrocution	
38	March 29, 1940	Press Bibbs	20	18	2	Male	Black	South Carolina	Electrocution	
39	March 31, 1940	Bluitt Hampton	28	27	1	Male	Black	Texas	Electrocution	
40	April 5, 1940	Zeb Page	29	29	0	Male	Black	North Carolina	Gas chamber	
41	April 12, 1940	Otis Manning	27	Unknown	Unknown	Male	Black	Arkansas	Electrocution	
42	April 12, 1940	Willie Bradshaw	65	63	2	Male	Black	Virginia	Electrocution	
43	April 19, 1940	Howard Poe	25	23	2	Male	Black	Illinois	Electrocution	
44	April 19, 1940	Robert Ballard Walker	25	24	1	Male	White	Texas	Electrocution	
45	April 19, 1940	Stanley Simon Lantzer	38	36	2	Male	White	Wyoming	Gas chamber	
46	April 25, 1940	Gus Schweinberger	33	32	1	Male	White	New York	Electrocution	
47	April 26, 1940	Wilmer Davis	25	Unknown	Unknown	Male	Black	Virginia	Electrocution	
48	April 28, 1940	Webster Lyons	29	27	2	Male	Black	Texas	Electrocution	
49	April 28, 1940	Robert Manning	20	18	2	Male	Black	Texas	Electrocution	
50	April 29, 1940	Vincent Cots Jr.	32	31	1	Male	White	Connecticut	Electrocution	
51	April 29, 1940	Ira Allen Weaver	36	35	1	Male	White	Connecticut	Electrocution	
52	May 3, 1940	Judge Ragland	34	Unknown	Unknown	Male	Black	Alabama	Electrocution	
53	May 7, 1940	Walter H. Rhodes	32	28	4	Male	White	Iowa	Hanging	
54	May 10, 1940	Otis Harrell	23	23	0	Male	Black	Maryland	Hanging	
55	May 10, 1940	William T. Sorrell	28	28	0	Male	Black	Maryland	Hanging	
56	May 17, 1940	Virgilio Spinelli	60	58	2	Male	White	California	Gas chamber	
57	May 17, 1940	Robert Brown	26	25	1	Male	Black	Georgia	Electrocution	
58	May 17, 1940	Victor Nukowski	24	23	1	Male	White	Illinois	Electrocution	
59	May 17, 1940	Frank Michalowski	25	24	1	Male	White	Illinois	Electrocution	
60	May 24, 1940	David McGuire	25	23	2	Male	Black	Alabama	Electrocution	
61	May 24, 1940	Simon Gibson	23	Unknown	Unknown	Male	Black	North Carolina	Gas chamber	
62	May 27, 1940	Mateo Quinones	44	Unknown	Unknown	Male	Asian	Hawaii Territory	Hanging	
63	May 28, 1940	Wilson Henry Boyd	44	44	0	Male	Black	Nevada	Gas chamber	
64	June 5, 1940	Clarence Parker	29	27	2	Male	Black	Florida	Electrocution	
65	June 7, 1940	Burton Franks	22	21	1	Male	White	Texas	Electrocution	
66	June 9, 1940	Placido Handy	36	30	6	Male	Hispanic	Texas	Electrocution	
67	June 14, 1940	William C. Williams	31	30	1	Male	White	Alabama	Electrocution	
68	June 14, 1940	Charlie Hopkins	63	62	1	Male	Black	North Carolina	Gas chamber	
69	June 14, 1940	Will Lowry	18	18	0	Male	Black	South Carolina	Electrocution	
70	June 28, 1940	Antwine McClain	38	36	2	Male	Black	Louisiana	Hanging	
71	June 28, 1940	Alexander Williams	33	33	0	Male	Black	Maryland	Hanging	
72	June 28, 1940	Lee Flynn	44	43	1	Male	White	North Carolina	Gas chamber	
73	June 28, 1940	Byzantine Hartman	29	29	0	Male	White	West Virginia	Hanging	
74	July 10, 1940	Monroe Bohannon	32	31	1	Male	Black	Ohio	Electrocution	
75	July 11, 1940	Oliver R. Alridge	47	46	1	Male	Black	New York	Electrocution	
76	July 11, 1940	James Pryor	23	22	1	Male	Black	New York	Electrocution	
77	July 15, 1940	George Howell	22	21	1	Male	Black	Pennsylvania	Electrocution	
78	July 19, 1940	Robert Claude Perry	71	70	1	Male	White	California	Gas chamber	
79	July 19, 1940	Honore Migues	31	28	3	Male	White	Louisiana	Hanging	
80	July 26, 1940	Henry Phillips	43	41	2	Male	Black	Kentucky	Electrocution	
81	July 26, 1940	Claude Edward Cline	46	46	0	Male	White	Oregon	Gas chamber	
82	July 27, 1940	Frank Lansing	26	26	0	Male	Black	South Carolina	Electrocution	
83	July 29, 1940	Herbert Willard Goddard Jr.	30	29	1	Male	White	Florida	Electrocution	
84	August 1, 1940	Norman James Wheelock	27	26	1	Male	White	New York	Electrocution	
85	August 9, 1940	Willie James Brandon	23	22	1	Male	Black	Alabama	Electrocution	
86	August 9, 1940	Robert Grey Burgunder Jr.	23	22	1	Male	White	Arizona	Gas chamber	
87	August 16, 1940	Everett Gilbert Parman	29	27	2	Male	White	California	Gas chamber	
88	August 16, 1940	Curtis Barkley	34	Unknown	Unknown	Male	Black	Georgia	Electrocution	
89	August 16, 1940	Oscar Fields	24	Unknown	Unknown	Male	Black	Georgia	Electrocution	
90	August 16, 1940	Charles Peyton	Unknown	Unknown	2	Male	Black	Louisiana	Hanging	
91	August 23, 1940	Rodney J. Greig	23	21	2	Male	White	California	Gas chamber	
92	August 23, 1940	Eddie Brown	29	Unknown	Unknown	Male	Black	Georgia	Electrocution	
93	August 23, 1940	Charles Josey	20	20	0	Male	Black	Georgia	Electrocution	
94	August 30, 1940	Ernest Huston Houston	21	20	1	Male	Black	Kentucky	Electrocution	
95	August 30, 1940	Florence L. Murphy	26	25	1	Male	Black	Texas	Electrocution	
96	September 4, 1940	William Henry Nelson	46	45	1	Male	White	Tennessee	Electrocution	
97	September 4, 1940	James Goodin	21	20	1	Male	Black	Tennessee	Electrocution	
98	September 6, 1940	George Abney	38	38	0	Male	Black	South Carolina	Electrocution	
99	September 6, 1940	Edward L. Bouchard	46	45	1	Male	White	Washington	Hanging	
100	September 12, 1940	Frank Blazek	30	29	1	Male	White	New York	Electrocution	
101	September 12, 1940	Benjamin Ertel	25	22	3	Male	White	New York	Electrocution	
102	September 13, 1940	Arthur Collick	28	28	0	Male	Black	Maryland	Hanging	
103	September 20, 1940	Robert Leslie West	25	23	2	Male	White	Missouri	Gas chamber	
104	September 20, 1940	Chester Jackson	30	28	2	Male	Black	Missouri	Gas chamber	
105	October 4, 1940	Fred Anderson	19	16	3	Male	Black	Georgia	Electrocution	
106	October 4, 1940	Jack C. Marable	40	39	1	Male	White	Washington	Hanging	
107	October 11, 1940	Hilton Fortenberry	30	29	1	Male	Black	Mississippi	Hanging	
108	October 11, 1940	Willie May Bragg	28	28	0	Male	Black	Mississippi	Electrocution	
109	October 18, 1940	Henry William Hicks	18	18	0	Male	Black	Georgia	Electrocution	
110	October 18, 1940	Charles Clemons	40	Unknown	Unknown	Male	Black	Mississippi	Electrocution	
111	October 18, 1940	William Gordon	31	Unknown	Unknown	Male	Black	Mississippi	Electrocution	
112	October 23, 1940	Eugene Harris	24	23	1	Male	Black	Ohio	Electrocution	
113	October 25, 1940	R. L. Jones	27	25	2	Male	Black	Louisiana	Hanging	
114	November 8, 1940	John William Sutton	22	22	0	Male	Black	Georgia	Electrocution	
115	November 11, 1940	Ivory Lee Williams	19	18	1	Male	Black	Florida	Electrocution	
116	November 15, 1940	Jack Gulley	26	25	1	Male	Black	Arkansas	Electrocution	
117	November 15, 1940	Roger William Cunningham	35	33	2	Male	White	Oklahoma	Electrocution	
118	December 6, 1940	Zedekiel Smith	29	28	1	Male	Black	North Carolina	Gas chamber	
119	December 6, 1940	Paul Tross	41	41	0	Male	Black	West Virginia	Hanging	
120	December 13, 1940	James Dillard	30	30	0	Male	Black	Arkansas	Electrocution	
121	December 13, 1940	Robert Lee Brannon	39	29	10	Male	Black	Georgia	Electrocution	
122	December 13, 1940	Buddie Lawrence	28	28	0	Male	Black	Georgia	Electrocution	
123	December 13, 1940	Robert Schroeder	26	26	0	Male	White	Illinois	Electrocution	
124	December 27, 1940	Jennings Waddell	34	Unknown	Unknown	Male	Black	Georgia	Electrocution	

== Demographics ==
Gender
Male	124	100%
Female	0	0%
Ethnicity
Black	76	61%
White	44	35%
Hispanic	3	2%
Asian	1	1%
State
Georgia	14	11%
New York	13	10%
North Carolina	10	8%
Alabama	9	7%
Texas	8	6%
California	6	5%
Maryland	6	5%
Mississippi	5	4%
South Carolina	5	4%
Arkansas	4	3%
Illinois	4	3%
Louisiana	4	3%
Pennsylvania	4	3%
Tennessee	4	3%
Virginia	4	3%
Florida	3	2%
Connecticut	2	2%
Kentucky	2	2%
Missouri	2	2%
Ohio	2	2%
Oklahoma	2	2%
Washington	2	2%
West Virginia	2	2%
Arizona	1	1%
Hawaii Territory	1	1%
Iowa	1	1%
Nevada	1	1%
New Jersey	1	1%
Oregon	1	1%
Wyoming	1	1%
Method
Electrocution	84	68%
Gas chamber	22	18%
Hanging	18	15%
Month
January	13	10%
February	11	9%
March	15	12%
April	12	10%
May	12	10%
June	10	8%
July	10	8%
August	12	10%
September	9	7%
October	9	7%
November	4	3%
December	7	6%
Age
Unknown	1	1%
10–19	6	5%
20–29	65	52%
30–39	30	24%
40–49	17	23%
50–59	0	0%
60–69	4	3%
70–79	1	1%
Total	124	100%

== Executions in recent years ==
Number of executions
1941	123
1940	124
1939	162
Total	409

Preceded by 1939	List of people executed in the United States in 1940	Succeeded by 1941
