= Maine Memorial Company =

American stone carving company

- Formerly: Michael DiMatteo Memorials
- Type: Private
- Industry: Memorial making
- Founded: 1919 (107 years ago)
- Founder: Michael DiMatteo
- Headquarters: South Portland, Maine, U.S.
- Owner: Paul DiMatteo (since 1988)
- Website: www.mainememorial.com

Maine Memorial Company (originally Michael DiMatteo Memorials) is a monument maker in South Portland, Maine. Located at 200 Main Street (U.S. Route 1), just to the northeast of Cash Corner, it is one of the oldest continuously operating companies in the state, having been established in 1919.

As of 2026, it is owned by Paul A. DiMatteo, the grandson of the founder, Michael DiMatteo. Michael, a native of Lettomanoppello, Italy, owned it between 1919 and 1970, when it passed it to his son Joseph. Joseph owned it between 1970 and 1988, at which point it came into the ownership of his sons, Paul and Joseph Jr. Paul bought his brother out in 1994 to become the sole owner.

Michael DiMatteo and his father, Michael Sr., emigrated to the United States in 1907 aboard the SS Romanic. They arrived in Boston but moved to Portland, Maine, around 1910. Michael married compatriot Antoinetta Colucci, who had emigrated separately from Italy. In 1919, Michael moved a building from South Portland's Meeting House Hill to its present location on Main Street, opposite Calvary Cemetery. Originally operating the business under his own name, Michael incorporated the business in 1935 as Maine Memorial Company Inc.

In 1998, a decade into Paul's ownership, the company won the Aspire Award from the Monument Builders of North America (MBNA) for its achievements in marketing and public relations. It was the award again the following year. In 2015, the company became a member of the American Institute of Commemorative Art (AICA).

A wooden mallet which the family brought with them from Italy is on display in the South Portland Historical Society.
