= Shirley J. Allen =

American academic (born 1941)

- Born: Shirley Jeanne Allen; 1941 (age 84–85); Nacogdoches, Texas, United States
- Education: Gallaudet University; Howard University; University of Rochester
- Occupation: Academic
- Known for: The first black and deaf woman to earn a doctoral degree

Shirley J. Allen (born 1941) is an American academic. A longtime professor at the Rochester Institute of Technology, in 1992 she became the first black and deaf woman to earn a doctoral degree.

== Biography ==
Shirley Jeanne Allen was born in Nacogdoches, Texas, United States, in 1941. She graduated from E.J. Campbell High School in 1959, a decade before desegregation came to Nacogdoches.

She then moved with her family for a period to La Marque, before enrolling in the music program at Jarvis Christian College. While still in college, at the age of 20, she contracted typhoid fever and, after a period spent in a coma, became deaf.

Despite her deafness, she continued to perform piano, including for her senior recital at Jarvis.

Allen went on to complete her bachelor's degree at Gallaudet University, graduating in 1966. In 1972, she obtained a master's degree in guidance and counseling from Howard University.

In 1992, she obtained a doctorate in education, focused on counseling, from the University of Rochester. With this, she became the first black and deaf woman to earn a doctorate.

Allen worked as an instructor at Gallaudet from 1968 to 1973. Then, beginning in 1973, she was a professor at the Rochester Institute of Technology for 28 years, teaching at the university's National Technical Institute for the Deaf. She was also involved in advocacy for deaf and black students, and served as a visiting board member at Jarvis Christian College. She retired from academia in 2001.

In 1992, Allen was named to Jarvis Christian College's Pioneer Hall of Fame.
