= Christine Benton Cash =

American educator (1889–1988)

- Christine Benton Cash, from a 1942 publication
- Born: Christine Benton; August 9, 1889; Marion County, Texas, U.S.
- Died: December 12, 1988 (aged 99); Harris County, Texas, U.S.
- Occupation: Educator

Christine Benton Cash (August 9, 1889 – December 12, 1988) was an American educator. She was the principal of the Center Point County Training School in Camp County, Texas from 1911 to 1949, and on the faculties at Bishop College and Jarvis Christian College.

== Early life and education ==
Christine Benton was born in Marion County, Texas, the daughter of James Benton and Kizziah Lugenia Dotson Benton. She graduated from Bishop College Academy in 1906, trained as a teacher. She continued her education throughout her career, including summer sessions at Hampton University. She earned a bachelor's degree from Bishop College in 1926, a master's degree from Atlanta University in 1943, and a Ph.D. from the University of Wisconsin in 1947, one of the first Black women in Texas to hold a doctorate.

She was a member of Delta Sigma Theta and Pi Lambda Theta.

== Career ==
Cash taught Black students in a one-room schoolhouse in Marion County for five years as a young woman. She became principal of Center Point School after her husband resigned from the same job. She remained head of the school until 1949, leading the twelve-grade rural vocational school through two world wars, periods of major expansion, electrification, and the state accreditation process. The school's 14-acre campus and six buildings were maintained by the student body, and included a public library, a sawmill, a cotton gin, and a cannery. The school closed soon after her departure, after the Texas legislature changed school funding laws and Camp County consolidated its segregated schools.

Cash was involved in statewide committees on curriculum and school reform. She taught education courses at Bishop College from 1948 to 1956. From 1958 to 1965 she was a member of the faculty at Jarvis Christian College, where she chaired the divisions of social sciences and teacher education. Political scientist Mae C. King attended Bishop College, and described Cash as a "very special woman" who "ignited my interest in politics."

Cash was active in church activities, especially the Northeast Texas Baptist Women's Convention, and the Baptist Women's Missionary and Educational Convention of Texas. She was a member of the American Association of University Women, and several teachers' organizations. She was also a member of Marshall's Court of Calanthe for over 50 years.

== Personal life ==
Benton married fellow educator Larry Brown Cash in 1909. Cash died in 1988, in Harris County, Texas, at the age of 99. Musician Peggy Shivers is one of Cash's nieces. Cash's nephew Marion Meredith Beal received the Congressional Gold Medal in 2012.
