= Murder of James Bailey Cash Jr. =

1938 kidnapping for ransom

- Location: Princeton, Florida
- Date: May 28, 1938
- Attack type: Kidnapping, murder
- Weapon: handkerchief
- Deaths: 1
- Victim: James Bailey "Skeegie" Cash Jr. (1932 –1938)
- Perpetrator: Franklin Pierce McCall Jr.
- Motive: Ransom
- Charges: Murder
- Verdict: Guilty

James Bailey "Skeegie" Cash Jr. (August 2, 1932 – May 28, 1938) was a five-year-old child from Princeton, Florida who was kidnapped and murdered by 22-year-old Franklin Pierce McCall Jr. in 1938.

McCall successfully collected a large ransom for the dead child, having gone so far as to plant and publicly "discover" one of his own ransom notes, leading the authorities to detain him as a suspect. After several days of interrogation, McCall confessed to Cash's abduction and directed authorities to the hidden ransom money and the child's remains. McCall pleaded guilty, making a trial unnecessary, and was sentenced to death in 1938 and executed by electric chair in 1939.

== Background ==
During the 1930s, the United States experienced a series of "ransom kidnappings" committed explicitly for financial gain, with victims generally from either middle-class or wealthy families. The most widely publicized ransom kidnapping at the time was the 1932 kidnapping of Charles Lindbergh Jr., the only son of the record-setting aviator Charles Lindbergh. Like James Bailey Cash Jr., Lindbergh's son died during the abduction, but a ransom was sought nevertheless. The Lindbergh case inspired Congress to pass legislation that allowed the Federal Bureau of Investigation (FBI) to investigate kidnappings in any state under certain conditions, one of which was a ransom demand. Despite this legislation, ransom kidnappings continued to be a major concern at the time when James Bailey Cash Jr. was abducted in May 1938.

== Kidnapping ==
On the night of May 28, 1938, Cash was kidnapped in the middle of the night by McCall, a local laborer and a former tenant of the Cash family. After putting Cash to bed, sometime after 9:30 pm, his mother, Vera Cash locked up the house and left to meet her husband at the family-owned general store. Sometime later, McCall entered the house and used a handkerchief to quiet the boy before taking him from the home, smothering him to death in the process. McCall hid the boy's body about a half-mile away from his home. By 10:10 PM, both parents returned home to find the boy missing and began to search the surrounding area. The search effort was later joined by neighbors and local Boy Scouts.

Soon after the murder, by 11:00 pm the same night, McCall began to intimidate John Emanuel and Geraldine Barnes, a local African American farming couple. At first, McCall attempted to get Emanuel to speak with him and to deliver a letter to Bailey Cash, Cash Jr.'s father. Emanuel, however, refused and McCall threatened to shoot Emanuel before leaving. The couple then left their home, to hide out at a friend's home for safety. Meanwhile, Beatrice Cash, a relative of Bailey Cash who lived in the same town, found a letter wrapped around the door knob on her front door, which instructed the reader to go to a specific house in Princeton's African American neighborhood where they would find further instructions.

The note was addressed to J.B. Cash. Beatrice woke up her husband and drove over to the Cash residence to help with the search. The house mentioned in the letter was the house belonging to Emanuel. By midnight the search was beginning to end; by now many of them were angry over the disappearance and by 1:00 AM, Bailey Cash and the rest of the family went over to Emanuel's house, surrounding it while Bailey and Asbury began to look for the note. They soon found the note underneath the door of the house. This note was the first of a series of ransom letters that the Cash family would receive.

== Ransom letter ==
The first note was composed of multiple sheets of paper with a series of demands written throughout:

The Cash family was to provide 10,000 dollars in various types of bills with mixed serial numbers and deliver the money in a shoe box to Homestead, where they would drive along the road until they saw a flash two times, at which point they would leave the money on the roadside and continue the route. If Bailey complied, and kept the ransom secret, the note promised that Cash Jr. would be safely returned.

== Investigation and FBI involvement ==
By 3:00 that morning, Special Agent Arthur Rutzen of the FBI had been contacted by a Dade County sheriff's deputy, R.B. Eavenson. They would meet up later at the Roberts Hotel at Miami Beach to further discuss the case. After their discussion, another investigator, Samuel K. McKee, joined the case. McKee and Rutzen went to the Cash home to continue the investigation.

At the Cash residence, Bailey Cash and Rutzen began to discuss the two ransom notes, and after examining the slang used within the ransom notes they concluded that the kidnapper had to be from the local area. During this meeting, Bailey asked the FBI to refrain from acting until after Bailey had paid the ransom, as permitted by Florida law. Rutzen allowed his request. From the interview with Bailey, as well as an interview with the Cashes' upstairs renters, Rutzen assessed that the motive for kidnapping was most likely exclusively monetary rather than as part of a personal vendetta, as Bailey's income was well known, and he had few enemies within the town. Bailey believed that the kidnapper had to be someone who knew the Cashes personally, as they were aware of his financial situation along with the schedule he and his wife followed.

After this meeting, on Sunday morning at 10:15, McKee and Rutzen called the FBI headquarters in Washington D.C. requesting more agents be sent to help with the investigation. Director J. Edgar Hoover approved the request and later that day Agent Earl J. Connelly, an agent experienced with kidnappings during his career, was sent to Miami to take charge of the investigation. With the FBI now present and involved they began to set up a telephone line within the Cash home and began to take charge of the ransom payment as the Cash family was not wealthy enough to meet the demands of the ransom letter.

On May 29, FBI agents were made aware that news of the kidnapping had made its way to the media. Two companies, The Miami Herald and the Miami Daily News agreed to a media blackout until Cash Jr. was rescued and the ransom was paid. The following day, May 30, FBI agents were sent to the First National Bank and Trust Company of Miami to gather the necessary funds, as well as to fulfill the necessary protocols for a ransom payment, including sending the serial numbers on the bills to every bank and post office within the U.S. and Canada. The money was given to Bailey Cash, who followed the ransom note's instructions and attempted a delivery by midnight.

According to McCall, around 12:45 AM he discovered a third ransom letter at a local Amoco gas station, owned by another member of the Cash family, Wilson P. Cash. In reality, McCall had planted the note, sliding the note under the door while talking with an employee, Harry Wright, outside. An hour after leaving the note, McCall returned to the gas station with another friend, claiming he needed gas for a family member's car. McCall claimed that he saw someone strange by the pumps, although no one else was found in the vicinity. McCall and the friend entered the gas station to turn on the gas pumps, at which point McCall picked up the note he had previously left. He began reading and making calls out the note. McCall would find Bailey Cash on his way home at 1:00 AM, coming back from the ransom drop off after not receiving the signal mentioned in the second note.

This new note instructed Bailey Cash to redo the ransom payment, this time at 4:00 AM on May 31 along the same route. At 4:10 AM, Bailey Cash left the money ($10,000 in a shoebox) by a telephone pole. McCall at this point was hiding at an orange grove, and after collecting the money, he hid the money in various places around Princeton before going to visit friends. Searches for Cash Jr. continued on May 31, which McCall would join. That same day, the media began to speak about the case. Soon there was an influx of attempted help by citizens who reported believed sightings of Cash Jr., and reporting on rumors of who could be involved. These tips yielded two possible suspects: James Sidney Smith, a prior criminal known to the FBI at the time, and M.F. Braxton, who was known to have had prior disagreements with Bailey Cash. More substantial help came on June 1 from thousands of members of the American Legion, the Civilian Conservation Corps and the Red Cross, among many other groups who worked alongside FBI members and Sheriffs to continue the search. Together, these groups searched one hundred square miles, but ultimately did not find Cash Jr. By June 3 this group of thousands would be withdrawn, and a smaller group of 150 members who possessed tracking skills would be sent in to continue the search with law officers. Later that same day the search would be called off.

== McCall's arrest and ending the investigation ==
Even though the search was officially over, McCall aroused suspicion due in part to his final ransom note and the circumstances surrounding its discovery. The authorities brought McCall in for questioning on June 5. During the investigation, McCall and other suspects were subjected to a lie detector test. The interrogations took place over a three-day period, and by June 7, McCall had confessed to the murder of Cash Jr. McCall's motive for the kidnapping and murder was to make money to support his wife's spending habits, and for himself as well. After the interrogations were over, McCall would take the investigators to the locations where the ransom money, and then later the victim's body had been hidden. In a report to Hoover, Agent Connelly explained that during their search on June 3 the searchers were "just one-tenth of a mile west of the spot where the body was found."

== Trial and execution ==
With the discovery of the body, Hoover removed the restrictions on the media, which quickly began to write about McCall, the murder, and his confession. After the confession, McCall had been moved to the Biscayne Building, however, his stay was short-lived. Angered over the murder of Cash Jr. a mob of three hundred people formed outside the building to protest. McCall was moved to Dade County Jail for safety. He pleaded guilty, so there was no trial. On June 15, there was a preliminary hearing, and the following day, a presentation of evidence. McCall was sentenced to death. The execution was carried out on February 24, 1939, by electric chair in the Florida State Prison at Raiford. McCall was the first to die in Florida under the "Lindbergh Law".

== Funeral ==
Cash Jr. was buried in Graceland Memorial Park in Coral Gables on June 9, 1938.

== Legacy ==
In 2018, the Historic Homestead Town Hall Museum put on an exhibition about the case.

== See also ==
- List of kidnappings (1900–1939)
- List of solved missing person cases (pre-1950)
- List of people executed in Florida (pre-1972)
- List of people executed in the United States in 1939
