= William Johansen =

American serial killer (1915–1941)

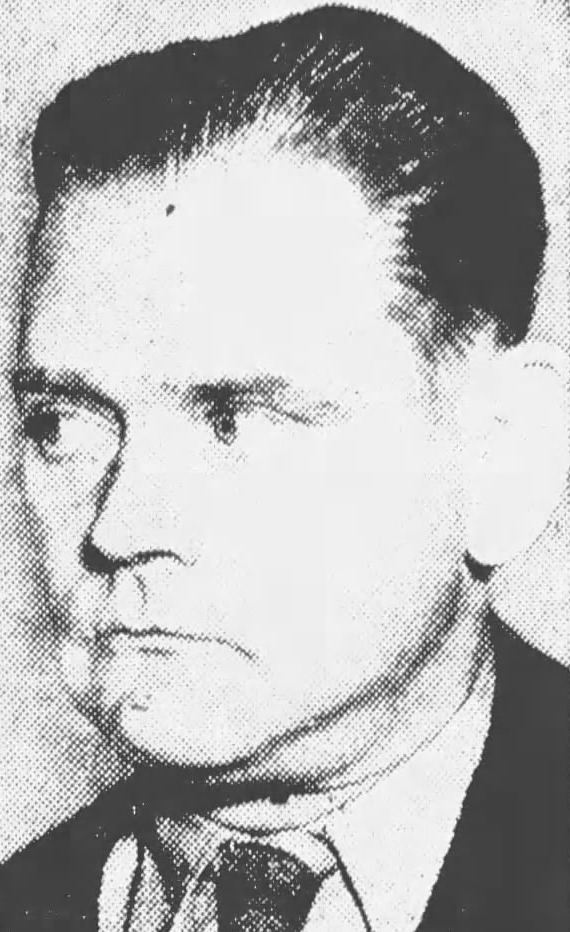
- Johansen in 1940–41
- Born: February 24, 1905; Denmark
- Died: September 5, 1941 (aged 36); San Quentin State Prison, San Quentin, California, U.S.
- Cause of death: Execution by gas chamber
- Other name: Harry Gordon
- Occupation: Sailor for the SUP (Sailor's Union of Pacific)
- Spouses: Florence Gordon (died 1933): Lydia Gordon
- Children: 2
- Conviction: First degree murder (2 counts)
- Penalty: Death

Details
- Victims: 3
- Span of crimes: 1933–1940
- Country: United States
- States: New York and California
- Date apprehended: July 9, 1940

William L. Johansen (February 24, 1905 – September 5, 1941), also known under the alias Harry W. Gordon, was a Danish-American serial killer who murdered three women, including his first wife, in New York and California between 1933 and 1940. He was arrested soon after his final murder, and executed by gas chamber at San Quentin State Prison the following year.

== Personal life ==
On February 24, 1905, Johansen was born in Denmark and moved to Beverly, Massachusetts, at an early age. After finishing eighth grade, he briefly served in the Army. As an adult, he moved to New York City and worked various jobs at theaters and restaurants, the latter he received three years' probation for embezzling from. He once worked in a hospital morgue, where he began having urges about cutting people. His urges intensified when he drank whiskey, and he often slept with corpses there. Johansen later married a woman named Florence, and they had two children together. However, the marriage deteriorated, and the couple separated.

== Murders ==
At midnight on October 20, 1933, Johansen, after having an argument with Florence, grabbed her by the throat and choked her until she died. He proceeded to place her corpse on a bed and cut open her abdomen with a boning knife to see if she was pregnant, which she claimed to be. Investigators thought she killed herself in seppuku fashion, so her death was ruled a suicide. Johansen assumed the alias of Harry W. Gordon and left New York to work as a sea merchant. Eighteen months later, he arrived in San Francisco.

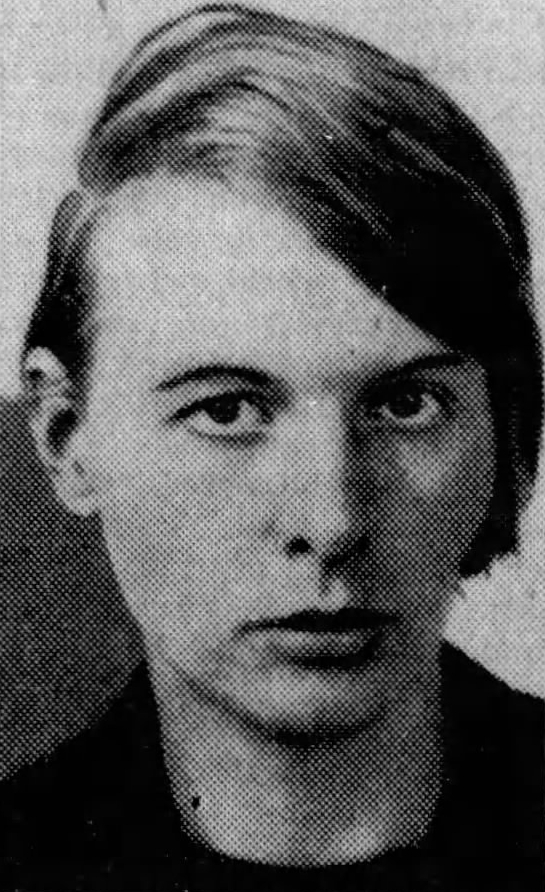
Irene McCarthy

On the night of April 6, 1935, Johansen solicited Lena Betty Coffin, a 35-year-old prostitute, on Market Street. The two went to a nearby motel and he secured a room. They gave their names as "Mr. and Mrs. H. Meyers," and Johansen told the clerk he was a sailor. One hour later, he grabbed Coffin by the throat and strangled her into semiconsciousness. Afterwards, he taped her mouth shut to stop her from screaming and stabbed her to death. He then cleaned the room of fingerprints and other evidence before returning to his job. He soon headed to Portland and spent a substantial amount of time on the Gulf of Mexico and in Texas. However, he eventually returned to California and married Lydia Gordon, a woman who ran a flower shop in Long Beach.

On June 24, 1940, Johansen met Irene McCarthy at a beer hall on Fifth Street. They drank together and both were fairly intoxicated. The two went to a nearby hotel after he bought a bottle of whiskey, and he registered a room under "Mr. and Mrs. J. Wilkins of Los Angeles." Upon entering the room, McCarthy undressed and went to sleep. Johansen tried to arouse her, but she would not wake up, so he strangled her to death with her own girdle. He proceeded to cut off a portion of her torso with a knife and place it near her corpse. He then threw her body off the bed, turned over the mattress to hide the bloodstains, and washed himself before leaving the hotel. Later that day, he took a bus to Los Angeles.

=== Other possible victims ===
Due to the similar ways they dismembered their victims, Johansen was investigated in connection to the Cleveland Torso Murderer, an unidentified serial killer who murdered at least 12 people in Ohio between 1934 and 1938. Police also suspected him of several unsolved killings in San Diego. However, he was never charged with any of these murders.

== Imprisonment and execution ==
=== Capture and trial ===
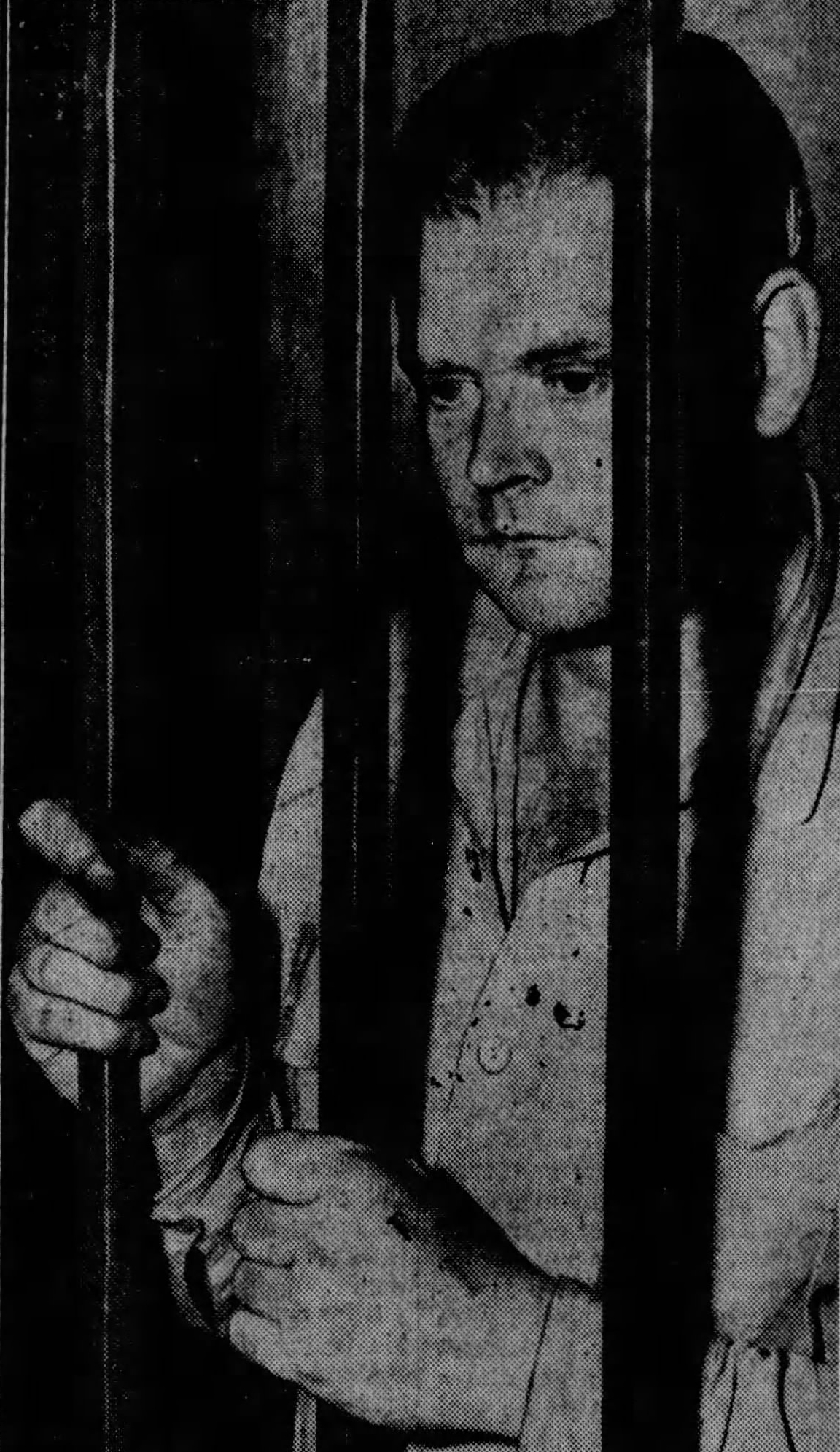
Johansen in prison

After McCarthy's murder, detectives investigated local bars and found a witness who had seen them together and knew Johansen's alias. Police arrested him in Los Angeles on July 9, 1940, as he walked out of a meeting. Employees of the hotel identified him as the man last seen with McCarthy, and he subsequently confessed to Coffin's and McCarthy's murders. He then revealed his true identity, and told them how he murdered his first wife. Johansen was charged with the two California murders. Although he wanted to plea guilty, his public defender would not allow him to, so he instead pleaded innocent. However, Johansan again changed his plea from innocent to not guilty by reason of insanity. Believing he was insane, he sought confinement in asylum, once telling the judge, "I'll kill some other woman if you free me. I'll do it again, sure!"

In October 1940, he was found legally sane and automatically convicted of the murders. One day later, he was sentenced to death. He was apathetic towards the verdict, telling the judge, "it doesn't make any difference."

=== Execution ===
On September 5, 1941, Johansen was executed by gas chamber at San Quentin State Prison. He had previously told reporters that he did not care about his upcoming execution, stating, "I don't give a damn if I go to the gas house. Not much doubt I'm a menace. I've killed three women and I'd probably do it again unless they get me out of the way. I expect the worst, and the sooner it comes the better."
