= Juanita Spinelli =

American gangster and murderer

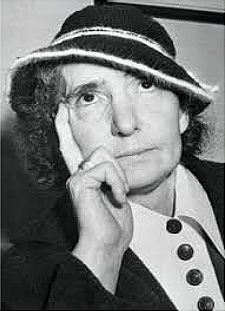
- The Duchess: first woman executed in San Quentin's gas chamber.
- Born: October 17, 1889; Kentucky, U.S.
- Died: November 21, 1941 (aged 52); San Quentin State Prison, San Quentin, California, U.S.
- Cause of death: Execution by gas chamber
- Status: Executed
- Conviction: First degree murder
- Penalty: Death

Evelita Juanita Spinelli (October 17, 1889 – November 21, 1941) nicknamed The Duchess, was the first woman to be executed by the state of California. She was a gangster and ex-wrestler.

== Criminal history ==
FBI profiler Candice DeLong described Spinelli as a "stone cold psychopath who had no use for anybody, other than what she could get out of them."(Deadly Women, season 4, episode 2). Spinelli, who fled Detroit and the so-called Purple Gang she ran with—earning her the nickname "The Duchess"—settled in San Francisco, where she regularly took in young, delinquent, homeless men. She would cook and clean for them and train them to be professional criminals. The men received a ten-dollar weekly allowance, with Spinelli receiving the lion's share of their ill-gotten gains. Her daughter Lorraine, known as "Gypsy", regularly used a honey trap to snare drunken men, who were consequently mugged.

On April 8, 1940, two of Spinelli's protégés, Albert Ives and Raymond Sherrod, killed Leland Cash during an armed robbery in San Francisco. Due to his deafness, Cash did not hear the request to put his hands up and was shot in the stomach. Fearing Sherrod would confess to the police, Spinelli gave him whiskey that she had laced with chloral hydrate. The gang then beat him up while he was unconscious. To make his death appear accidental, they threw him off the Clarksburg bridge on the Sacramento River, just south of Sacramento, wearing only swimming trunks. However, the autopsy showed there was no water in his lungs. Fearing for his own survival, Ives confessed to the police and was later committed to Mendocino State Hospital. Spinelli was consequently arrested.

Police ballistics matched the bullet that killed Cash with a gun that belonged to Spinelli.

Her gang members testified against her at her trial. On May 30 Spinelli, Ives, Simeone and Hawkins were found guilty. She appealed (along with her co-defendants Simeone and Hawkins) in 1941, however their appeals were unsuccessful.

She was described by Clinton Duffy, the warden at San Quentin State Prison, as "the coldest, hardest character, male or female, I have ever known, a homely, scrawny, nearsighted, sharp-featured scarecrow. ... The Duchess was a hag, evil as a witch, horrible to look at, impossible to like."

== Execution ==
Her last meal was a hamburger and turkey meat. Spinelli's original execution was delayed for 30 days by Governor Culbert Olson. Following two further repreives, she was executed on November 21, 1941, at the age of 52, in the gas chamber at San Quentin. A week later, Mike Simeone her 'first lieutenant and common-law husband' was executed, along with Gordon Hawkins.

== In popular culture ==
Her story was dramatized on TV in the Gang Busters episode, "The Duchess Spinelli Case".
