= A. J. Cash =

Merchant in Maine (1838–1892)

Andrew Jackson Cash
- Born: April 8, 1838; Cape Elizabeth, Maine, U.S.
- Died: August 31, 1892 (aged 54); Cape Elizabeth, Maine, U.S.
- Resting place: Brown's Hill Cemetery, South Portland, Maine, U.S.
- Occupation: merchant

Andrew Jackson Cash (April 8, 1838 – August 31, 1892) was an American merchant for whom Cash Corner, in today's South Portland, Maine, is now named.

== Life and career ==
Cash was born to Stephen Cash and Elizabeth Palmer, both natives of Cape Elizabeth, Maine.

Between 1856 and 1862, he was a "peddler of dry goods, tinware and notions," on a route that took him from Maine to New Hampshire.

He enlisted in the 25th Maine Volunteer Infantry, Company I, in 1862.

In 1864, he married Agnes Jane Moody, with whom he had two known children: Andrew Jr. (1865) and Alphonso (1868). The same year, he was working in the Portland glass works, a role in which he continued until 1873. He returned to being a peddler for the next nine years.

In 1882, aged 44, he became a grocer at Cash Corner, in today's South Portland, Maine, which is named for him and his brother, fellow merchant George Washington Cash.

== Death ==
Cash died in 1892, aged 54. He was interred in Brown's Hill Cemetery in South Portland. His wife survived him by 41 years, and was buried beside him in 1933.
