= Philadelphia poison ring =

Murder for hire gang in Philadelphia, US

The Philadelphia poison ring was a murder for hire gang led by Italian immigrant cousins, Herman and Paul Petrillo, in 1930s Philadelphia, where the Italian community had more than doubled in 20 years from 76,734 in 1910 (the year the Petrillos arrived in the country) to over 155,000 by 1930 - just before the murder ring began operations. The activities of the ring came to light in 1938 and the cousins were ultimately convicted of first degree murder and executed by electric chair in 1941.

A Russian-Jewish immigrant gang member, Morris Bolber, known as 'Louie, the Rabbi', turned state's evidence. Gang members, associates and 'dupes' (many of them Italian-born, superstitious women, dubbed 'poison widows' by an excited press) were brought to trial and mostly convicted to death sentences (later commuted) or varying prison sentences. One or two were found not guilty, notably the widow Stella Alfonsi, whose husband's 1938 death by poison brought the case to light, and who was successfully defended by the lawyer Raymond Pace Alexander.

== History ==
Herman and Paul Petrillo were cousins. Herman was an expert counterfeiter and arsonist, with contacts in the criminal world, while Paul ran an insurance scam business from the back of his tailor's shop and aspired to a paid consultancy in 'la fattura', a magic believed in and resorted to by many in South Philadelphia's Italian community. The murders began in 1931, with Herman enlisting associate thugs to kill men he had arranged to insure, to collect on the double indemnity accident insurance.

Herman ruthlessly and euphemistically described this as "sending [them] to California". Two victims, Ralph Caruso and Joseph Arena were both drowned and bludgeoned on separate fishing trips. While a third victim, John Woloshyn, was first bludgeoned and then repeatedly run over by a car. Meanwhile, Herman tried to steer clear of repeated attempts by the authorities to bring him to justice for insurance fraud, arson and currency counterfeiting.

As the Depression deepened, the Petrillos headed an informal gang, now including Morris Bolber and other self-styled 'fattuchierie' (wise women, witches) such as Maria Carina Favato, Josephine Sedita and Rose Carina, who offered superstitious, unhappily married, murderous or merely gullible women incantations, powders and potions to adjust their lives. These 'love potions' usually contained arsenic, or antimony, and they were invariably accompanied by excessive insurance policies on the victims, often made out in favour of gang members rather than the supposed 'poison widow' beneficiaries.

The gang embraced insurance agents and made highly successful use of the period's widespread cheap insurance policies, often taken out without medical examination (not required for policies under $500) or the knowledge of the principal concerned, who would subsequently meet an agonising death by arsenic, engineered by the spouse; possibly with intent, possibly in superstitious ignorance of their actions. This went on from 1932 until 1938, when the death of Ferdinando Alfonsi in a hospital brought matters into the open.

Vincent P. McDevitt was an Assistant District Attorney in Philadelphia. In early 1939, the District Attorney, Charles F. Kelley, assigned him to the homicide case of Ferdinando Alfonsi, who had died on October 27, 1938. McDevitt immediately had information from two undercover detectives, agents Landvoight and Phillips. From them, McDevitt had an informant, one George Meyer, who ran a local upholstery cleaning business.

Meyer encountered Herman Petrillo when he was trying to obtain money for his business. Petrillo had offered to provide him with a large sum of money in both legal tender and counterfeit, if Meyer would perform the hit on Alfonsi. Landvoight and Meyer had played along with the murder plot, with Meyer hoping for an advance pay-out and Landvoight hoping to finally bust Petrillo's counterfeiting crimes. Working undercover, Landvoight helped Meyer "play along," as the Petrillos plotted the murder that they wanted Meyer to carry out.

== Murder ==
The plan was to steal or buy a car, take Alfonsi out to a dark country road and hit him with the car, thus making the murder look accidental. Herman Petrillo preferred the idea to steal the car rather than buy one, but Landvoight and Phillips were hoping to convince Petrillo to give them money to buy a car for the murder, as it would give them the opportunity that Phillips had so long prayed for, to arrest him on counterfeit charges. In the end, Petrillo sold them some fake tender, ostensibly for buying a means of transportation to the planned crime scene.

The "play along" plan continued until Meyer, on a whim of curiosity and concern, decided to visit the intended murder victim. At the front door of the house where Alfonsi lived, Meyer learned from an old woman who had opened the door that Alfonsi was gravely ill. After notifying Phillips, he returned with Phillips and Landvoight to the Alfonsi house. They found Alfonsi to be bizarrely ill, suffering symptoms of bulging eyes, immobility, and being unable to speak. At their next meeting with Herman Petrillo, after Petrillo handed Phillips an envelope full of counterfeit bills, Phillips asked about the plan to murder Alfonsi. Petrillo replied that there was no reason to worry about it anymore; it was being handled, apparently.

== Investigation ==
Ferdinando Alfonsi died after being admitted to the National Stomach Hospital in Philadelphia, Pennsylvania. The cause of death was heavy metal poisoning. The autopsy revealed tremendous arsenic levels. The detectives assigned to the case were Michael Schwartz, Anthony Franchetti, and Samuel Riccardi. They instantly thought of the rumors, already well-developed, about a highly organized arsenic killing spree surging through the city. Indeed, there were distinct patterns. The victims tended to be Italian immigrants, as Alfonsi was, and to have high levels of arsenic in their bloodstreams.

Herman Petrillo and Mrs. Stella Alfonsi were both arrested. Mrs. Alfonsi had purchased a sizable life insurance policy for her husband, an immigrant who could not read English. He had been unaware of the policy, signing some documents with a cross while others bearing Alfonsi's signature were ineptly forged by Herman Petrillo. The Alfonsi case fitted a rapidly emerging common modus operandi in a lot of other homicide investigations. Most importantly, each case involved a fresh life insurance policy with a double indemnity clause and a nearly direct lead to one of the Petrillo cousins, and each cause of death was listed as some sort of violent accident.

== In media ==
- Cooper, George (1999). Poison Widows. St. Martin's Press. ISBN 0-312-19947-3.

== See also ==
- List of serial killers in the United States
