= George Washington Cash =

Merchant in Maine (1838–1892)

- Born: March 31, 1841; Cape Elizabeth, Maine, U.S.
- Died: May 6, 1912 (aged 71); South Portland, Maine, U.S.
- Resting place: Brown's Hill Cemetery, South Portland, Maine, U.S.
- Occupation: merchant

George Washington Cash (March 31, 1841 – May 6, 1912) was an American merchant for whom Cash Corner, in today's South Portland, Maine, is now named.

== Life and career ==
Cash was born to Stephen Cash and Elizabeth Palmer, both natives of Cape Elizabeth, Maine.

He was an apprentice with N. Hasty, a cooper in Portland. He was also a peddler of goods.

In 1864, Cash married Olivia A. Littlefield, with whom he had eleven children: Alice, Henry, Dwight, Herbert, Eleanor, Christena, Bessie, Georgia, Chester, Cathleen and Harold. At least four of them died in infancy.

In 1870, aged 29, he became a grocer at Cash Corner, in today's South Portland, Maine, which is named for him and his brother, fellow merchant A. J. Cash.

== Death ==
Cash died in 1912, aged 71. He was interred in Brown's Hill Cemetery in South Portland, beside his wife, who predeceased him by five years.
