= Dave Cash (Yiddish comedian) =

Dave Cash (Yiddish: דייב קאש), born Ludwik Slomniker in 1910 in Lemberg, then Austria was a French Yiddish-language comedian, composer, musician and entertainer. He was famous in the Yiddish theater for his song parodies. He was the owner and the main performer of a Yiddish-language cabaret in Pigalle, that had an otherwise typical program for a French cabaret. Several of his humorous songs and stand-up routines were rereleased in Israel in 2004 under the name An Evening with Dave Cash ( ערב עם דייב קאש ). In 2015, the Institut Européen des Musiques Juives (European Institute for Jewish Musics) released a set of six CDs including some of his great hits. Dave Cash died in 1981 in Cannes, French Riviera. His wife, Jadwiga Podstolska, died in 2001.

== Discography ==
- Der Shere fun Seville
- A'fallen die Blettin
- Tzures mit Hula Hoop
- Yiddish Lieder Parade
- Ich dank dir Gott as ich hob es nicht
- Dave Cash Presente Ses Fantaisies Yiddish (Avec Didier Boland et Son Orchestre) (released 1956)
- An Evening With Dave Cash (Compilation CD release 2004)
