= Philip "Little Farvel" Cohen =

Drug trafficker and gangster (1906–1949)

Philip Cohen
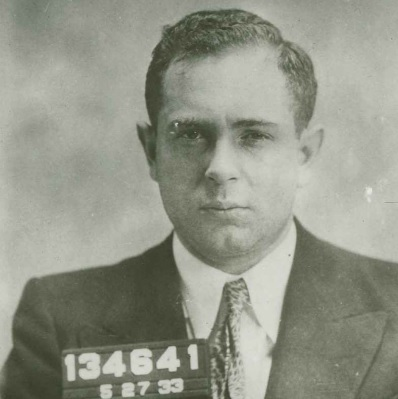
- Born: 1906 or 1907; Russian Empire
- Died: 15 September 1949; Valley Stream, Long Island, New York, U.S.
- Other name: Jack Kofsky
- Conviction: Narcotics trafficking
- Criminal charges: Narcotics trafficking, murder
- Penalty: 10 years

Philip "Little Farvel" Cohen alias Jack Kofsky (1906 or 1907 – 15 September 1949) was an organized crime figure in New York in the 1930s, now considered a member of the so-called Kosher Nostra. According to the authorities, Cohen, a former rackets collector, was a member of the criminal organization Murder, Inc., led by Louis Buchalter and, like Buchalter and other members of his organization, was involved in international drug trafficking.

== International drug trafficking ==
According to the findings of the Federal Bureau of Narcotics (FBN), the international drug trade intended for the USA in the 1920s and 1930s was largely controlled by Jacob Katzenberg, who was based in New York City. This operation initially obtained heroin and opium from Europe and later heroin directly from China. It then sold the drugs to a number of criminal gangs throughout the country, including the organization around Louis Buchalter, to which Philip Cohen belonged.

Cohen and his accomplice Emanuel Weiss were heavily involved in the criminal organization's drug deals. The FBN first became aware of the group's activities in 1935 when the remains of an opium processing plant were discovered by authorities after an explosion in a residential building on Seymour Avenue in New York City. The explosion left enough evidence to show what was being processed there but not enough on which to base a criminal prosecution.

In 1937, the FBN believed it had secured evidence of a violation of the Narcotics Act by Cohen and Weiss when they found Jacob Gottlieb at Rouses Point in New York State with a suitcase full of heroin. When he was arrested, he told the authorities that he had smuggled drugs from France through Canada to the USA for Cohen and Weiss and that the two were his clients. Shortly afterwards, while still in custody, Gottlieb committed suicide by hanging himself in his cell, allegedly for fear of retaliation against him and his family by Murder, Inc. No charges could be brought against Cohen or Weiss due to the death of the only witness against them.

In 1939, Cohen and Weiss were finally indicted for violations of the Narcotics Act. During a house search, FBN investigators discovered a chemical plant used to stretch morphine and had secured evidence of the involvement of Weiss and Cohen, as well as Samuel Bernstein, Abe "Little Yiddel" Lorber, and Al Angelson. All five were scheduled to be tried in 1940.

Emanuel Weiss and Philip Cohen were released after paying bail, but did not appear at the trial because they had also been charged in May, 1940 with the murder of Joseph Rosen, a former Garment District businessman whom Buchalter had forced out of the industry. After a manhunt of several months, New York police officers arrested Cohen on 30 November 1940 in a Brooklyn apartment, where they found him exhausted and under the influence of drugs. There was no sign of his accomplice Weiss.

Cohen went to trial with Bernstein, Lorber, and Angelson in 1941. All four were found guilty and sentenced to terms of three to ten years; Cohen was sentenced to ten years. Their appeals were unsuccessful.

== Murder of Joseph Rosen ==
Lepke Buchalter, the head of Murder, Inc., had over the years gained control of a number of businesses and unions in the garment and trucking industries in the Garment District of Manhattan. (Note: Buchalter was later convicted in December, 1937 of federal antitrust violations for his takeover of the rabbit fur industry in New York City. Buchalter jumped bail even before his conviction and remained in hiding for two years.) After Buchalter forced Joseph Rosen, a partner in a clothing manufacturing company and owner of several garment delivery trucks, out of the industry in the early 1930s by threats followed by vandalism, Rosen opened a newsstand and candy store in Brownsville, Brooklyn.

Governor Herbert Lehman appointed Thomas E. Dewey in 1935 as Special Prosecutor for Manhattan, with a mandate to attack the rackets that infested New York industries. Shortly thereafter a rumor circulated that Rosen was going to provide Dewey with incriminating information about Buchalter's operations in the Garment District. (Note: The rumor may have been unfounded, as Dewey later denied that he knew Rosen or had spoken to him.)

Buchalter decided to eliminate Rosen. On 13 September 1936, on Buchalter's orders, Rosen was shot in his shop. Harry "Pittsburgh Phil" Strauss was supposedly commissioned with the planning and execution of the crime along with James Ferraco, Emanuel Weiss, Sholem Bernstein and Louis Capone. Philip Cohen was reportedly the escape driver and is said to have transported the perpetrators, who initially used a stolen escape vehicle, in his car.

The murder went unsolved for several years until 1940, when Brooklyn District Attorney William O'Dwyer was able, with the help of testimony from contract killer Abe Reles, to charge Weiss, Capone and Buchalter. Cohen was initially named as a codefendant, but the case against him was severed from the others. As Cohen left the courtroom he assured Buchalter that he had not cooperated with the prosecution and would never testify against him.

The case against Cohen was later dismissed due to lack of evidence. Buchalter, Weiss, and Capone were convicted of the murder of Rosen and executed in Sing Sing Prison in 1944.

== Murder of Louis Cohen and Isadore Friedman ==
Philip Cohen was suspected of involvement in the killing of Louis Cohen on 28 January 1939, followed by the murder of Isadore Friedman aka Danny Fields on 29 January 1939. Buchalter allegedly directed that Friedman and Louis Cohen, both of whom had been part of Buchalter's organization, be murdered because he suspected that they were prepared to testify against him. However, in the absence of sufficient evidence, no charges were brought against Philip Cohen.

== Assassination ==
Philip Cohen was found dead, shot in the head four times, on a Long Island road on 15 September 1949, a few months after his release from prison. The authorities ruled out robbery, since the perpetrators showed no interest in the valuables that Cohen was carrying at thee time, and instead classified the murder as a classic underworld-style execution. Police officers later found Cohen's car with traces of blood on the passenger seat. Allegedly, Cohen was murdered in a manner similar to that used to kill several Murder, Inc. victims who were shot dead by a perpetrator sitting behind them during a final drive.

Some newspapers suggested that Cohen may have been murdered in retaliation for the conviction and execution of Louis Buchalter, Emanuel Weiss and Louis Capone by supposedly cooperating with the prosecution to avoid the electric chair. However, assistant district attorney Burton Turkus, who prosecuted the Joseph Rosen murder case, vigorously disputed these claims. As Turkus noted, Cohen never cooperated with the authorities; instead, in typical underworld fashion, he kept silent and rejected all offers made by the prosecution.

The police failed to solve Cohen's murder. It was rumored, however, that after his release from prison, Cohen started squeezing bookies handling illegal bets, demanding as much as sixty percent of their profits. As a prominent member of this illicit industry noted at the time, "Cohen has been bleeding bookies everywhere....There's a lot of guys happy that Cohen has been bumped off."
