= Phil Coleman =

Phil or Phillip Coleman may refer to:

- Phil Coleman (athlete) (born 1931), American runner
- Phil Coleman (footballer) (born 1960), English footballer
- Phillip Coleman (spree killer)
