= Henry Morgan (humorist) =

American comedian (1915–1994)

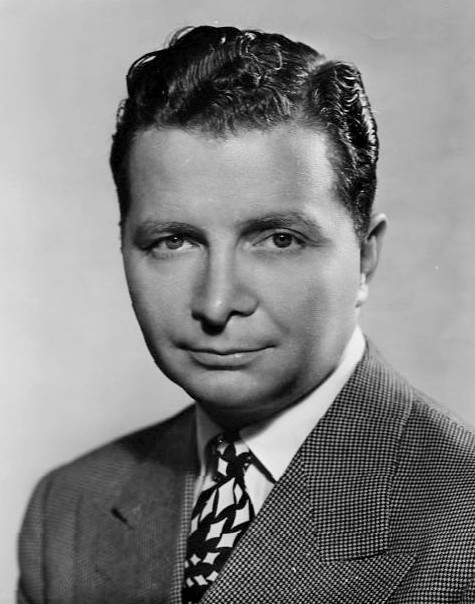
- Morgan (late 1940s-early 1950s)
- Born: Henry Lerner von Ost Jr. March 31, 1915; New York City, U.S.
- Died: May 19, 1994 (aged 79); Manhattan, New York City, U.S.
- Occupations: Humorist; comedian; game show panelist
- Years active: 1932–1982
- Spouses: Isobel Gibbs (m. 1946; div. 1948) Karen Sorensen (m. 1978–1994)

Henry Morgan (born Henry Lerner von Ost Jr.; March 31, 1915 – May 19, 1994) was an American humorist. He first became familiar to radio audiences in the 1930s and 1940s as a barbed but often self-deprecating satirist. In the 1950s and later he was a regular and cantankerous panelist on the game show I've Got a Secret as well as other game and talk shows.

== Early life and education ==
Morgan's parents divorced when he and his brother, Roger, were young. He grew up in Washington Heights, Manhattan, attended the High School of Commerce for two years, then went to the Harrisburg Academy in Pennsylvania, where he graduated in 1931.

== Radio ==
Morgan began his radio career as a page at New York City station WMCA in 1932, after which he held a number of radio jobs, including announcing. He strenuously objected to the professional name Morgan but was told that his birth name of von Ost was exotic and difficult to pronounce despite the fame of successful announcers Harry von Zell and Westbrook Van Voorhis. This began a long history of Morgan's arguments with executives.

In 1940, Morgan was offered a daily 15-minute comedy series on Mutual Broadcasting System's flagship station WOR.

In his memoir Here's Morgan (1994), Morgan wrote that he devised his introduction "Good evening, anybody; here's Morgan" as a dig at popular singer Kate Smith, who "started her show with a condescending, 'Hello, everybody.' I, on the other hand, was happy if anybody listened in." He mixed in barbed ad-libs, satirizing daily life's foibles, with novelty records, including those of Spike Jones. Morgan stated that Jones sent him his new records in advance of market dates because he played them so often.

Morgan appeared in the December 1944 CBS Radio original broadcast of Norman Corwin's play The Plot to Overthrow Christmas, taking several minor roles including those of the narrator, Ivan the Terrible and Simon Legree. He repeated his performance in the December 1944 production of the play.

Morgan targeted his sponsors freely. Adler Shoe Stores, one early sponsor, came close to canceling its account after Morgan made references to "Old Man Adler" on the air. The chain changed its mind after business spiked upward, with many new patrons asking to meet Old Man Adler. Morgan had to read an Adler commercial heralding the new fall line of colors. He thought the colors were dreadful and said he wouldn't wear them to a dogfight, but perhaps the listeners would like them. Old Man Adler demanded a retraction on the air and Morgan obliged: "I would wear them to a dogfight." He later recalled "It made him happy."

The Henry Morgan Show received a Peabody Award Special Citation of honor for 1946.

Morgan's friend Ed Herlihy, a veteran radio announcer, remembered him to radio historian Gerald Nachman (in Raised on Radio): "He was ahead of his time, but he was also hurt by his own disposition. He was very difficult. He was so brilliant that he'd get exasperated and he'd sulk. He was a great mind who never achieved the success he should have." Nachman wrote of Morgan that he was radio's "first true rebel because—like many comics who go for the jugular, from Lenny Bruce to Roseanne Barr—he didn't know when to quit."

Another supporter was character actor Arnold Stang, who worked as one of Morgan's second bananas on the ABC shows and was known later as the voice of Hanna-Barbera's Top Cat. "He was a masochist, a neurotic man," Stang told Nachman about his former boss. "When things were going well for him, he would do something to destroy himself. He just couldn't deal with success. He'd had an unhappy childhood that warped him a little and gave him a sour outlook on life. He had no close friends." Stang also claimed that Morgan's first wife "kept him deeply in debt and refused to give him a divorce", but the divorce did occur and decades later, Morgan remarried.

== Brief blacklisting ==
Morgan was briefly blacklisted after his name appeared in the anti-communist pamphlet Red Channels. Morgan's connections with communism were dubious at best. Nachman noted that Morgan's listing sprang from his former wife's leftist affiliations as Morgan confirmed in his memoir:

All her information came from friends whose conversation leaned sharply away from their relatively high incomes, which, apparently, they found to be embarrassing in a world that harbored poor people. Their chosen method of being helpful was to attend meetings at one another's homes and discuss the problems of the hungry hordes after dinner. I am not trying to be amusing; it's what they really did. A Party member was usually invited to lead the discussions. I was apolitical. To some, that meant that I was either stupid or "inner-directed"—which meant according to them that I didn't care about my fellow man. What I really didn't care about was the four or five of her friends who later became known as the Hollywood Ten.

Morgan married Isobel Gibbs on August 17, 1946 in Las Vegas. By 1948, they were separated. During an appearance on Late Night with David Letterman in 1982, Morgan told Letterman that Gibbs still was trying to sue him for more money.

Morgan revealed in his memoir that one of his cousins had been a Communist Party member until the Hitler-Stalin Pact caused him to break with the party and that this cousin had told investigators that Morgan had not been a party member. The cousin cooperated closely with investigators "when he learned that his agent, a Party member, had refused to accept assignments for him; his doctor, another Red, knowing of (his) bad heart, had recommended that he play tennis. The Party tried to rape him. It was enough to ruin his faith, it was. He decided to kill them, that was all." Morgan was cleared, and he resumed his broadcasting career.

== So This Is New York and early TV shows ==
Morgan made one film as a lead actor, producer Stanley Kramer's sophisticated comedy So This Is New York (1948), which featured Arnold Stang and loosely was based on Ring Lardner's 1920 novel The Big Town. Although Morgan and the film received favorable critical reviews, it was not as well received by the public as his radio and later television work.

In 1948, the fledgling ABC Television Network put Morgan on the air with On the Corner, which lasted for five weeks. On March 28, 1949, The Henry Morgan Show debuted on NBC television. It was broadcast Monday through Friday from 7:30 to 7:45 p.m. Eastern Time. In 1951, Morgan had a short-lived TV show on NBC, Henry Morgan's Great Talent Hunt, which replaced the NBC variety series Versatile Varieties, running from January 26 to June 1, 1951. The show started out as a take-off on The Original Amateur Hour, and featured Kaye Ballard (in her TV debut), Art Carney, Pert Kelton and Arnold Stang as Gerard. On April 20, NBC changed the show's title and format to The Henry Morgan Show, a comedy-variety show, and singers Dorothy Claire and Dorothy Jarnac provided musical numbers between the comedy sketches.

Morgan appeared as Brooklyn assistant district attorney Burton Turkus in the film Murder, Inc. (1960) with Stuart Whitman, May Britt and Peter Falk. A year earlier, he hosted the short-lived syndicated television program Henry Morgan and Company.

== I've Got a Secret ==
Morgan's longest-lasting television image began in June 1952 when he was invited to join I've Got a Secret, produced by Mark Goodson and Bill Todman. Morgan's tenure on the show was marked by his periodic sarcastic complaints about the working conditions. Morgan's mordant wit played well against the upbeat personalities of the other panelists, and producer Allan Sherman deliberately staged elaborate "secrets" involving Morgan personally. On various occasions, Morgan was:

- sent to Africa
- dispatched to an undisclosed location in the Caribbean to try Edward O. Thorp's card counting system for blackjack
- partially undressed on the air while trying to read a dramatic script (without breaking his composure)
- given a job by cowboy Roy Rogers on his ranch in California
- given janitorial equipment and told to clean up a messy, confetti-strewn theater stage
- assigned as a caddie for Arnold Palmer in a charity golf tournament
- dressed as Santa Claus by former panelist Faye Emerson, then told to deliver presents that night to children who had written letters to Santa;
- purchased a hotdog sold by Paul Newman at a World Series game at Ebbets Field

Morgan stayed with the show for its original 14-season run and rejoined it when it was revived twice: in syndication in 1972 and on CBS once more for a brief 1976 summer run.

== Other work ==
Morgan continued radio appearances, most often on the NBC weekend show NBC Monitor (1955–70), which afforded final airings to longtime radio favorites Fibber McGee and Molly until co-star Marian Jordan's death. He also appeared as a guest panelist on other game shows produced by the Goodson-Todman team, including What's My Line?, To Tell the Truth and The Match Game. Morgan also took a turn hosting the radio quiz show Sez Who, in 1959; the quiz involved guessing the famous voices making memorable comments that had been recorded over the years.

Morgan had three bylines in Mad magazine in 1957–1958 during the period when the magazine was adapting work from humorists such as Bob and Ray, Ernie Kovacs and Sid Caesar. During the early 1950s, he wrote a weekly humor column for the New York Post. Morgan occasionally was seen on the weekly news satire That Was The Week That Was in 1964–1965. Also in the 1960s, he made numerous appearances in the early years of The Tonight Show Starring Johnny Carson and became a regular cast member of the short-lived but respected James Thurber-based comedy series My World and Welcome to It in 1969. He was also a contestant on a 1963 edition of To Tell the Truth, in which he successfully fooled the panelists into thinking he was former Polish spy-turned-author Pawel Monat.

During the 1970s, Morgan wrote humorous commentaries for national magazines. His radio career gained a revival in his native New York City in the early 1980s because of his two-and-a-half-minute The Henry Morgan Show commentaries, broadcast twice daily on WNEW-AM (now WBBR) starting in January 1981. The following year, he added the Saturday-evening show Morgan and the Media on WOR.

On October 13, 1972, Morgan appeared as a last-minute fill-in on The Merv Griffin Show, and frustrated with fellow guest Charo's interruptions and deliberately contrived poor grasp of English, told Griffin "you dragged me out of bed because you said you were stuck for a guest, and I have to sit and listen to this nonsensical babble", and he walked off the set.

Morgan was a guest on the February 8, 1982 fifth episode of the nascent Late Night with David Letterman show with film producer and director Francis Ford Coppola during which Morgan gave a rambling account of his troubles with his ex-wife and left the show during a commercial break.

== Personal life and death ==
Morgan had a son, Steve Robinson, with Helen Louise Rankin. Steve did not meet his father until he was age 17.

Morgan was a second cousin of Broadway lyricist and librettist Alan Jay Lerner.

Morgan's 1994 memoir Here's Morgan! The Original Bad Boy of Broadcasting found him satirizing many of his former co-stars but not examining his professional life with much depth, as if the reader was listening to a vintage radio satire of Morgan's life. He also edited, with writer and editor Babette Rosmond, Shut Up, He Explained, an anthology of Ring Lardner's shorter works (Scribner, 1962).

His final national television appearance was on the CNBC cable television series Talk Live in early 1994. A few weeks after that broadcast, Morgan died of lung cancer at age 79.

== Bibliography ==
- Henry Morgan Henry Morgan's Jokebook (Avon, 1955)
- Henry Morgan; Babette Rosmond (Editors) Shut Up He Explained (Scribner, 1962)
- Gerald Gardner (with "Keynote Address" by Henry Morgan) Looks Like a Landslide (Fawcett, 1964)
- Henry Morgan; James Spanfeller, Illus. O-Sono and the Magician's Nephew, and the Elephant (Vanguard Press, 1964)
- Frank Buxton; Bill Owen (Henry Morgan – Introduction) The Big Broadcast: 1920–1950 (Viking Press, 1972)
- Henry Morgan; George Booth Dogs (Houghton Mifflin, 1976)
- Henry Morgan Here's Morgan! The Original Bad Boy of Broadcasting (Barricade Books, 1994)

== Audio ==
- The Henry Morgan Show (ten episodes)
- Henry Morgan hosting Monitor (30-minute segment)
- Here's Morgan

== Sources ==
- John Crosby, Out of the Blue: A Book About Radio and Television (New York: Simon and Schuster, 1952)
