= Louis Capone =

American mobster

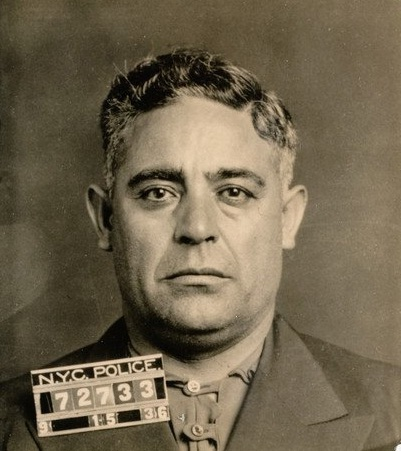
- Capone 1936 mugshot
- Born: September 5, 1896; Naples, Campania, Italy
- Died: March 4, 1944 (aged 47); Sing Sing Prison, New York, U.S.
- Resting place: Holy Cross Cemetery, Brooklyn, U.S.
- Other name: Lou Capone
- Status: Executed by electrocution
- Allegiance: Murder, Inc.
- Conviction: First degree murder (1941)
- Penalty: Death

Louis Capone (September 5, 1896 – March 4, 1944) was a New York organized crime figure who became a supervisor for Murder, Inc. Louis Capone had no known relation to Al Capone, the boss of the Chicago Outfit. Capone was convicted of murder in 1941, and sentenced to death. He was electrocuted at Sing Sing Prison on March 4, 1944.

== Early life ==
Capone was born in Naples, Italy, and moved to New York City with his family as a child, where he grew up in the Coney Island section of Brooklyn. As an adult, Capone moved to Brownsville, Brooklyn.

Capone was described as a suave, well-groomed man who projected sympathy. He had watery blue eyes and a broken nose.

== Mob rackets ==
Capone's legitimate business was a pasticceria (an Italian-style cafe serving coffee and pastries) in Brooklyn. The pasticceria became a popular hangout for teenagers, including future street gang leaders Abe Reles and Harry Maione. Capone built up a rapport with the boys by giving them free food. These young men soon became Capone's protégés in crime.

Capone had strong connections with the Purple Gang of Detroit, and was operating loansharking operations in both Detroit and New York. He was also involved in labor racketeering with the local Plasterers Union and had close ties with mobster Joe Adonis.

== Murder, Inc. ==
With the end of the Castellammarese War in 1931, Reles' and Maione's gangs developed into a network of contract killers that became known as Murder, Inc. Albert Anastasia, a patron of Capone's restaurant, persuaded the two gang leaders that they could make a lot of money by working together for the Cosa Nostra. Anastasia would send Cosa Nostra murder contracts to mobster Louis "Lepke" Buchalter, the boss of Murder, Inc. Capone would recruit the individual hitmen from the Reles and Maione gangs. These hitmen were mainly Jewish and Italian-American hoodlums from Brooklyn. By 1934, all the Cosa Nostra families were using Murder, Inc. As time progressed, Capone spent considerable energy mediating disputes between the two gang leaders.

== Murders ==
In 1936, Capone participated in the murder of Joseph Rosen. Buchalter had previously ruined Rosen's trucking business and was now afraid that Rosen would implicate him in criminal activity. To protect himself, Buchalter ordered Rosen's murder. On September 13, 1936, Harry Strauss, Emanuel Weiss and James Ferraco shot Rosen 17 times in his Brooklyn candy store, killing him instantly. Capone identified the victim and worked out a plan for the gunmen.

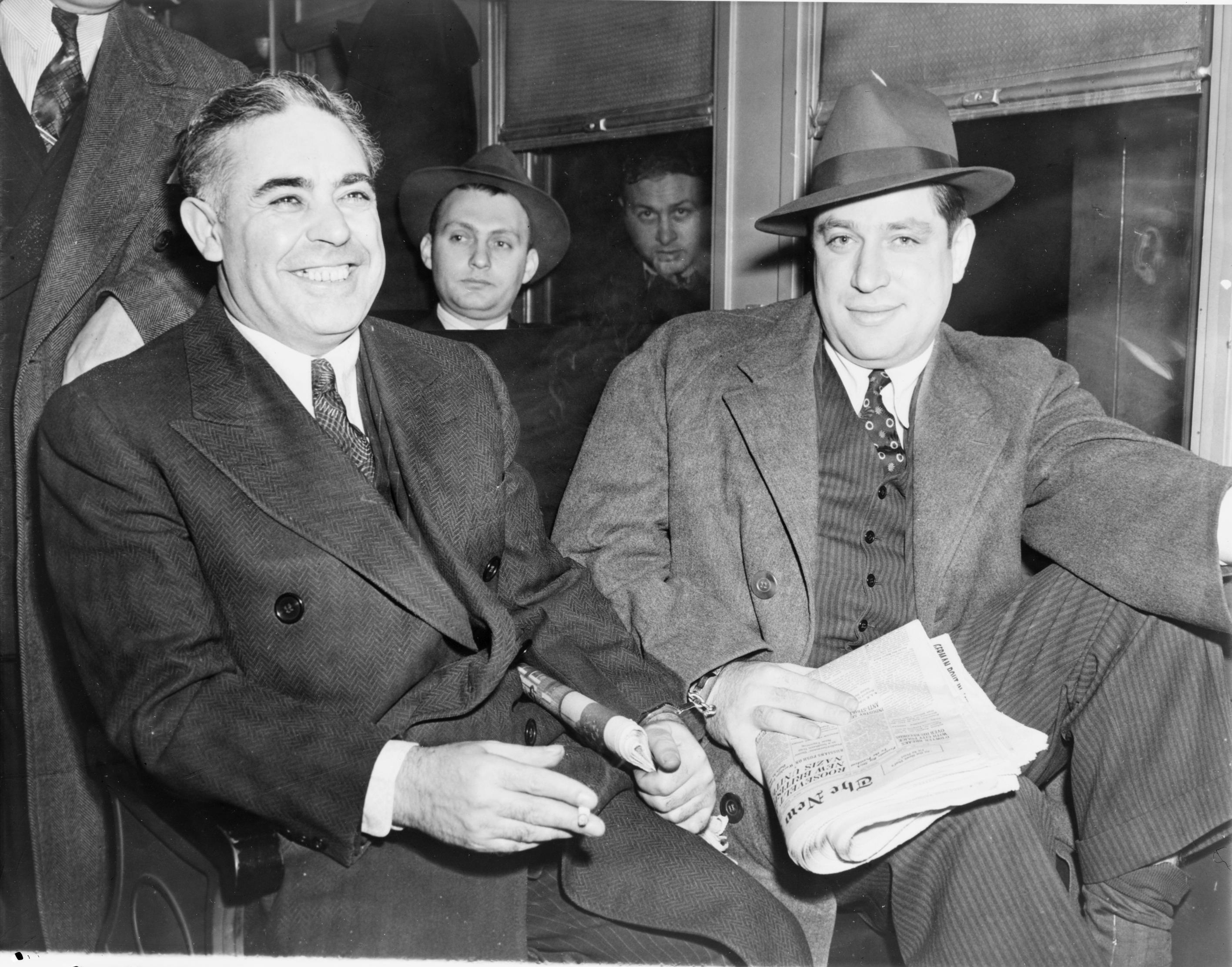
Smiling convicted killers Emanuel "Mendy" Weiss (right) and Louis Capone, surrounded by detectives, ride the New York Central railroad "up the river" to the Sing Sing prison death house on December 3, 1941, the day after receiving their sentences.

In 1939, Capone allegedly participated in the murder of Irving Penn. Buchalter had ordered Capone to plan the murder of Philip Orlovsky, a mobster who was cooperating with the government in an investigation of Buchalter. Capone gave the job of identifying the target to mobster Jacob "Kuppy" Migden. On July 25, 1939, Migden mistakenly identified Penn, a publishing executive, to the alleged hitman Gioacchino "Jack the Dandy" Parisi, who then shot and killed Penn in front of his home in the Bronx.

== Indictments ==
In 1940, Reles became a government witness and helped break up Murder, Inc. In jail on a pending 1933 murder charge, Reles gave in to pleas from his wife and agreed to help prosecute Capone and the rest of the organization. In early 1941, as a result of Reles' assistance, Capone was indicted in the Penn murder. However, Capone never went to trial on these charges.

On November 30, 1941, Capone and the other defendants were convicted of first degree murder in the 1936 Rosen killing. At that time, New York state law mandated the death penalty for this offense. Over the next two and a half years, Capone and his co-defendants filed a series of legal appeals that culminated in a case review by the United States Supreme Court. After their legal appeals were exhausted, the condemned men submitted clemency petitions to the governor of New York, which were all denied.

== Death ==
On March 4, 1944, Louis Capone went to the electric chair at Sing Sing Prison in Ossining, New York. Capone had no final words. He was followed in the chair by Weiss and Buchalter.

Capone was buried in Holy Cross Cemetery in Brooklyn.

== In popular culture ==
In the 1960 film Murder, Inc., Capone was portrayed by Lou Polan.

== See also ==
- Capital punishment in New York (state)
- Capital punishment in the United States
- List of people executed in New York
- List of people executed in the United States in 1944
