= List of people executed in the United States in 1944 =

One hundred and twenty-two people, one hundred and nineteen male and three female, were executed in the United States in 1944, eighty-four by electrocution, twenty-four by gas chamber, thirteen by hanging, and one by firing squad.

The U.S. territory of Hawaii would conduct its final execution this year before abolishing the death penalty in 1957; it was not a state until 1959. Kansas carried out its first executions since 1870. The state had reinstated the death penalty in 1935 after initially abolishing it in 1907.

Finally, four notable executions were those of Emanuel Weiss, Louis Buchalter, and Louis Capone (no relation to Al Capone). In addition, Fourteen-year-old George Stinney was controversially executed by South Carolina, becoming the youngest person with an exact birth date confirmed to be executed in the United States in the 20th century. Stinney's murder conviction was posthumously vacated in 2014, with Judge Carmen Mullen finding that he had not received a fair trial. Judge Mullen explained in his opinion that, while Stinney may have actually been guilty, his pre-trial confession was likely coerced, his civil rights had been violated, and his execution was thus illegal.

== List of people executed in the United States in 1944 ==
No.	Date of execution	Name	Age of person			Gender	Ethnicity	State	Method	Ref.
No.	Date of execution	Name	At execution	At offense	Age difference	Gender	Ethnicity	State	Method	Ref.
1	January 5, 1944	Willie Hubbard	28	Unknown	Unknown	Male	Black	Georgia	Electrocution	
2	January 6, 1944	Joseph Charles Mascari	32	31	1	Male	White	New York	Electrocution	
3	January 7, 1944	Isaac Irwin	31	29	2	Male	White	Georgia	Electrocution	
4	January 7, 1944	Adriano Domingo	33	32	1	Male	Asian	Hawaii Territory	Hanging	
5	January 8, 1944	Lionel James Allen	28	27	1	Male	Black	Louisiana	Electrocution	
6	January 13, 1944	Herbert Lewis	35	Unknown	Unknown	Male	Black	New York	Electrocution	
7	January 14, 1944	Louis Vernon Hand	17	17	0	Male	White	Ohio	Electrocution	
8	January 21, 1944	Marcelino Bautista	31	31	0	Male	Asian	California	Gas chamber	
9	January 21, 1944	Louis Valle	43	42	1	Male	White	New York	Electrocution	
10	January 28, 1944	Farrington Graham Hill	31	30	1	Male	White	California	Gas chamber	
11	January 28, 1944	Alex Harris	48	47	1	Male	White	North Carolina	Gas chamber	
12	February 3, 1944	Willie Hicks	18	Unknown	Unknown	Male	Black	Georgia	Electrocution	
13	February 4, 1944	Claude Newman	20	19	1	Male	Black	Mississippi	Electrocution	
14	February 9, 1944	Elijah Parker	23	21	2	Male	Black	Mississippi	Electrocution	
15	February 10, 1944	John Regan	34	32	2	Male	White	New York	Electrocution	
16	February 15, 1944	Glenard Brown	19	18	1	Male	White	California	Gas chamber	
17	February 15, 1944	John Swan	26	24	2	Male	Black	New Jersey	Electrocution	
18	February 18, 1944	Andrew Wilson Farrell	25	24	1	Male	White	North Carolina	Gas chamber	
19	February 25, 1944	William Charles Holsey	33	32	1	Male	Black	Maryland	Hanging	
20	February 25, 1944	Waymon Grainger	31	29	2	Male	Black	North Carolina	Gas chamber	
21	February 29, 1944	Howard E. Jefferson	30	27	3	Male	Black	New Jersey	Electrocution	
22	March 2, 1944	Joseph Palmer	28	26	2	Male	White	New York	Electrocution	
23	March 2, 1944	Vincent Sallami	26	24	2	Male	White	New York	Electrocution	
24	March 3, 1944	James Raymond Woodall	36	36	0	Male	White	Virginia	Electrocution	
25	March 4, 1944	Parker Lloyd Adams	27	Unknown	Unknown	Male	Black	Louisiana	Electrocution	
26	March 4, 1944	Louis Capone	47	40	7	Male	White	New York	Electrocution	
27	March 4, 1944	Emanuel Weiss	37	30	7	Male	White	New York	Electrocution	
28	March 4, 1944	Louis Buchalter	47	39	8	Male	White	New York	Electrocution	
29	March 6, 1944	Anthony Wilson	30	28	2	Male	Black	Louisiana	Electrocution	
30	March 6, 1944	Harvey Cunningham	39	37	2	Male	Black	Oregon	Gas chamber	
31	March 7, 1944	Marvin Lewis Lee	22	Unknown	Unknown	Male	Black	Georgia	Electrocution	
32	March 10, 1944	Ernest L. Hoefgen	32	31	1	Male	White	Kansas	Hanging	
33	March 10, 1944	Willie Johnson	37	36	1	Male	Black	Ohio	Electrocution	
34	March 15, 1944	Paul Leroy Williams	25	23	2	Male	White	Illinois	Electrocution	
35	March 17, 1944	Rock Hooten	24	Unknown	Unknown	Male	Black	Georgia	Electrocution	
36	March 20, 1944	Michael Musto	45	44	1	Male	White	Pennsylvania	Electrocution	
37	March 24, 1944	Lewis Mitchell	28	Unknown	Unknown	Male	Black	Alabama	Electrocution	
38	March 24, 1944	James Sidney Newsom Jr.	17	16	1	Male	Black	Mississippi	Electrocution	
39	March 31, 1944	Martin Smith	20	Unknown	Unknown	Male	Black	Maryland	Hanging	
40	April 7, 1944	Herbert Rozier	72	71	1	Male	Black	Georgia	Electrocution	
41	April 15, 1944	Fred L. Brady	47	46	1	Male	White	Kansas	Hanging	
42	April 15, 1944	Clark B. Knox	26	25	1	Male	Black	Kansas	Hanging	
43	April 16, 1944	Bruce Elton Jordan	25	24	1	Male	White	Texas	Electrocution	
44	April 28, 1944	Oscar Reed	26	25	1	Male	Black	Georgia	Electrocution	
45	April 28, 1944	Robert Walker	26	23	3	Male	Black	Georgia	Electrocution	
46	April 28, 1944	James Crosby	Unknown	Unknown	Unknown	Male	Black	Mississippi	Electrocution	
47	May 2, 1944	Juan Gutierrez	40	Unknown	Unknown	Male	Hispanic	Texas	Electrocution	
48	May 3, 1944	Carlo James DeCaro Jr.	19	19	0	Male	White	Connecticut	Electrocution	
49	May 5, 1944	Lawrence Pascal Phillips Sr.	44	42	2	Male	White	Mississippi	Electrocution	
50	May 12, 1944	Daniel Kolez	53	51	2	Male	White	California	Gas chamber	
51	May 12, 1944	Sammy Joe Timmons	20	Unknown	Unknown	Male	Black	South Carolina	Electrocution	
52	May 19, 1944	James Samuel Hughes	44	43	1	Male	White	Mississippi	Electrocution	
53	May 19, 1944	Mildred Louise Johnson	23	22	1	Female	Black	Mississippi	Electrocution	
54	May 25, 1944	Grady Ellison	36	34	2	Male	Black	Georgia	Electrocution	
55	May 25, 1944	John Ranford	41	40	1	Male	Black	New York	Electrocution	
56	May 26, 1944	Howard Robinson Walker	27	Unknown	Unknown	Male	Black	Virginia	Electrocution	
57	June 2, 1944	Seke Mack	40	Unknown	Unknown	Male	Black	Arkansas	Electrocution	
58	June 3, 1944	Louis Parisi	24	22	2	Male	White	New York	Electrocution	
59	June 16, 1944	William Shaw	35	34	1	Male	Black	California	Gas chamber	
60	June 16, 1944	John Hinton	25	25	0	Male	Black	Maryland	Hanging	
61	June 16, 1944	Allen Lambus	72	71	1	Male	Black	Missouri	Gas chamber	
62	June 16, 1944	George Junius Stinney Jr.	14	14	0	Male	Black	South Carolina	Electrocution	
63	June 16, 1944	George Bruce Hamilton	20	20	0	Male	Black	South Carolina	Electrocution	
64	June 16, 1944	Thomas William Clatterbuck	34	33	1	Male	White	Virginia	Electrocution	
65	June 19, 1944	Austin Cox Jr.	38	38	0	Male	White	Utah	Firing squad	
66	June 23, 1944	Gordon Cooke	20	18	2	Male	Black	New York	Electrocution	
67	June 23, 1944	Winston A. Sealy	22	20	2	Male	Black	New York	Electrocution	
68	June 26, 1944	Edgar Flowers	21	19	2	Male	Black	Florida	Electrocution	
69	June 29, 1944	Alex Bellomo	25	23	2	Male	White	New York	Electrocution	
70	June 29, 1944	Peter DeLutro	23	21	2	Male	White	New York	Electrocution	
71	June 29, 1944	Frank DiMaria	23	21	2	Male	White	New York	Electrocution	
72	June 30, 1944	Raymond Plunkett	30	29	1	Male	White	Nevada	Gas chamber	
73	July 7, 1944	Walker Hudson	53	Unknown	Unknown	Male	Black	Arkansas	Electrocution	
74	July 9, 1944	Bennie Johnson	41	40	1	Male	Black	Texas	Electrocution	
75	July 9, 1944	David Williams	19	17	2	Male	Black	Texas	Electrocution	
76	July 14, 1944	James Tacker	61	Unknown	Unknown	Male	White	Arkansas	Electrocution	
77	July 28, 1944	William B. Stroup	39	38	1	Male	White	Georgia	Electrocution	
78	July 30, 1944	Clay Whittle	37	36	1	Male	White	Texas	Electrocution	
79	August 10, 1944	Eddie Dillon	35	34	1	Male	Black	Mississippi	Electrocution	
80	August 18, 1944	Florencio Alcalde	31	29	2	Male	Hispanic	California	Gas chamber	
81	August 19, 1944	Edward Thompson	25	23	2	Male	White	Florida	Electrocution	
82	August 19, 1944	Earl Thompson	33	31	2	Male	White	Florida	Electrocution	
83	August 27, 1944	George Johnson	30	Unknown	Unknown	Male	Black	Texas	Electrocution	
84	August 27, 1944	Willie Johnson	38	36	2	Male	Black	Texas	Electrocution	
85	August 31, 1944	York Hing Lew	19	17	2	Male	Asian	New York	Electrocution	
86	August 31, 1944	Tieh Li Yun	24	23	1	Male	Asian	New York	Electrocution	
87	September 8, 1944	Persia Williams	38	38	0	Male	Black	Washington	Hanging	
88	September 15, 1944	Alvin Krause	29	28	1	Male	White	Illinois	Electrocution	
89	September 25, 1944	George Nelson Gatling	37	37	0	Male	Black	Pennsylvania	Electrocution	
90	September 26, 1944	Harry Ralph Bever	28	26	2	Male	White	U.S. military	Hanging	
91	September 29, 1944	Floyd Burton Loveless	17	15	2	Male	White	Nevada	Gas chamber	
92	October 9, 1944	James Davis	16	16	0	Male	Black	Florida	Electrocution	
93	October 9, 1944	Freddie Lee Lane	20	20	0	Male	Black	Florida	Electrocution	
94	October 9, 1944	James C. Williams	26	26	0	Male	Black	Florida	Electrocution	
95	October 19, 1944	James Thomas	20	18	2	Male	Black	Missouri	Gas chamber	
96	November 3, 1944	Joe Vernon	38	31	7	Male	Black	Alabama	Electrocution	
97	November 3, 1944	Charles Ivan Baa	22	20	2	Male	Black	California	Gas chamber	
98	November 3, 1944	James Taylor	48	Unknown	Unknown	Male	Black	North Carolina	Gas chamber	
99	November 3, 1944	Hurley Jones	Unknown	Unknown	Unknown	Male	Black	South Carolina	Electrocution	
100	November 16, 1944	Helen Fowler	37	36	1	Female	Black	New York	Electrocution	
101	November 16, 1944	George Franklin Knight	27	26	1	Male	Black	New York	Electrocution	
102	November 17, 1944	Calvin William Watkins Jr.	24	24	0	Male	Black	Maryland	Hanging	
103	November 17, 1944	Charles Alexander	24	Unknown	Unknown	Male	Black	North Carolina	Gas chamber	
104	November 17, 1944	Cleveland Brown Jr.	27	26	1	Male	Black	Wyoming	Gas chamber	
105	November 24, 1944	George Walter Brooks	20	20	0	Male	Black	North Carolina	Gas chamber	
106	November 24, 1944	James W. Buchanan	19	19	0	Male	Black	North Carolina	Gas chamber	
107	November 27, 1944	Thomas Hays Elliott	25	23	2	Male	Black	Pennsylvania	Electrocution	
108	December 1, 1944	Levi Clingham	41	41	0	Male	Black	Arkansas	Electrocution	
109	December 1, 1944	John William Kehoe	50	46	4	Male	White	Mississippi	Electrocution	
110	December 8, 1944	Richard Harry Layton	36	35	1	Male	White	Oregon	Gas chamber	
111	December 8, 1944	Edward Heberling	32	32	0	Male	White	Washington	Hanging	
112	December 18, 1944	Charlie B. Williams	26	26	0	Male	Black	U.S. military	Hanging	
113	December 19, 1944	Joe Basil Stephens	37	36	1	Male	White	Texas	Electrocution	
114	December 22, 1944	Henry Lee Wiley	23	22	1	Male	Black	Mississippi	Electrocution	
115	December 28, 1944	Tom Mix	45	43	2	Male	Black	Florida	Electrocution	
116	December 29, 1944	Stanley Morris Kaster	36	35	1	Male	White	Iowa	Hanging	
117	December 29, 1944	Joseph Marion Leemon	19	18	1	Male	White	Mississippi	Electrocution	
118	December 29, 1944	Maurice M. Shimniok	19	18	1	Male	White	Mississippi	Electrocution	
119	December 29, 1944	Bessie Mae Williams	20	19	0	Female	Black	North Carolina	Gas chamber	
120	December 29, 1944	Ralph Thompson	18	18	0	Male	Black	North Carolina	Gas chamber	
120	December 29, 1944	Melvin Wade	24	23	1	Male	Black	North Carolina	Gas chamber	
121	December 31, 1944	Allen Murray	32	30	2	Male	Black	Texas	Electrocution	

== Demographics ==
Gender
Male	119	98%
Female	3	2%
Ethnicity
Black	70	57%
White	46	38%
Asian	4	3%
Hispanic	2	2%
State
New York	20	16%
Mississippi	12	10%
Georgia	10	8%
North Carolina	10	8%
Texas	9	7%
California	7	6%
Florida	7	6%
Arkansas	4	3%
Maryland	4	3%
South Carolina	4	3%
Kansas	3	2%
Louisiana	3	2%
Pennsylvania	3	2%
Virginia	3	2%
Alabama	2	2%
Illinois	2	2%
Missouri	2	2%
Nevada	2	2%
New Jersey	2	2%
Ohio	2	2%
Oregon	2	2%
U.S. military	2	2%
Washington	2	2%
Connecticut	1	1%
Hawaii Territory	1	1%
Iowa	1	1%
Utah	1	1%
Wyoming	1	1%
Method
Electrocution	84	69%
Gas chamber	24	20%
Hanging	13	11%
Firing squad	1	1%
Month
January	11	9%
February	10	8%
March	18	15%
April	7	6%
May	10	8%
June	16	13%
July	6	5%
August	8	7%
September	5	4%
October	4	3%
November	12	10%
December	15	12%
Age
Unknown	2	2%
10–19	14	11%
20–29	48	39%
30–39	37	30%
40–49	15	12%
50–59	3	2%
60–69	1	1%
70–79	2	2%
Total	122	100%

== Executions in recent years ==
Number of executions
1945	142
1944	122
1943	138
Total	402

Preceded by 1943	List of people executed in the United States in 1944	Succeeded by 1945
