= Emanuel Weiss =

American mobster (1906–1944)

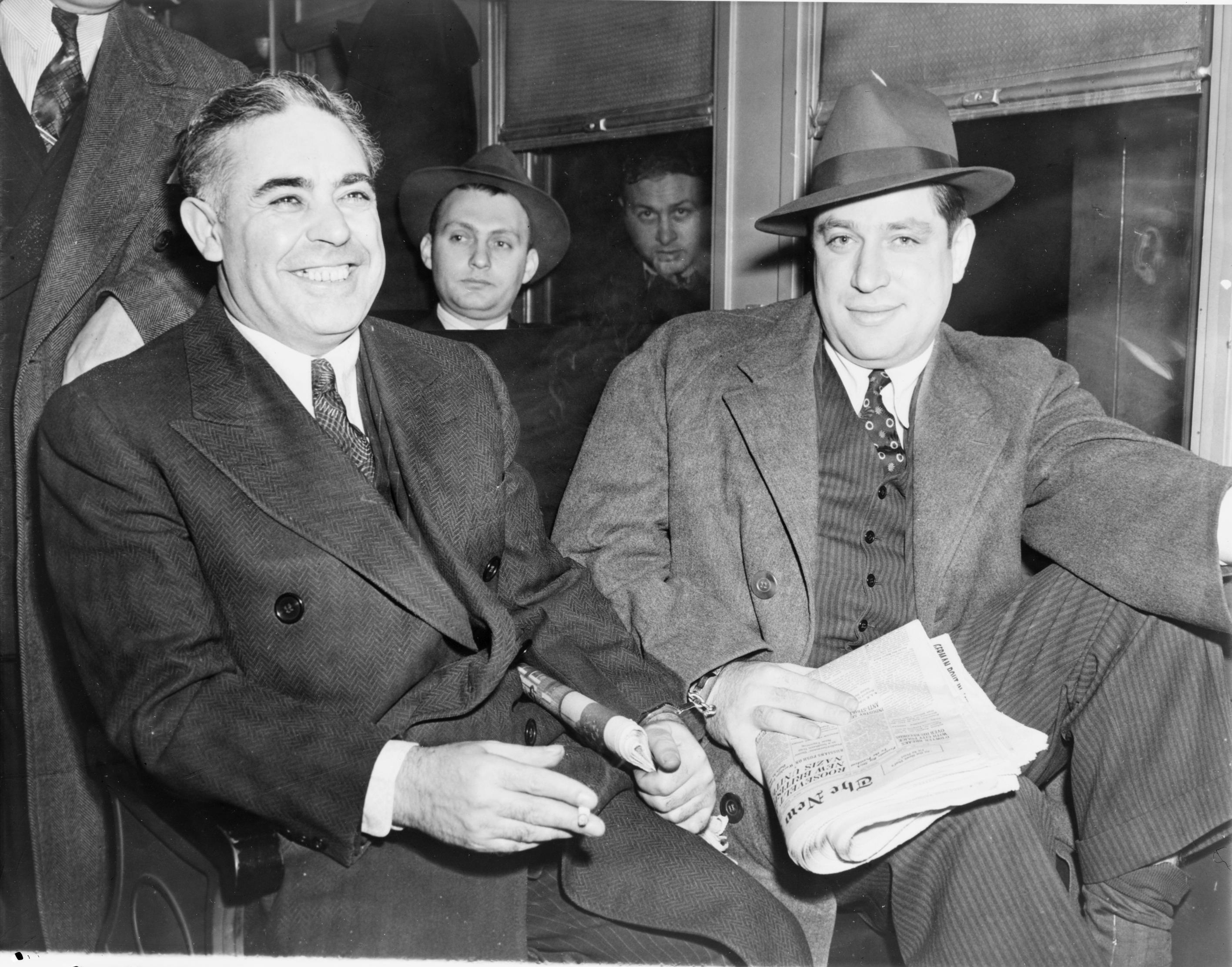
- Weiss (right) and Louis Capone, surrounded by detectives, ride the New York Central Railroad "up the river" to the Sing Sing prison death house on December 3, 1941, the day after receiving their sentences.
- Born: June 11, 1906; New York City, U.S.
- Died: March 4, 1944 (aged 37); Sing Sing Prison, New York, U.S.
- Other names: Sam Kline, Henry Gold, Mendy
- Spouse: Blanche Weiss
- Status: Executed by electrocution
- Conviction: First degree murder
- Penalty: Death

Emanuel "Mendy" Weiss (June 11, 1906 – March 4, 1944) was an American organized crime figure. He was an associate of the notorious Louis Buchalter and part of Buchalter's criminal organization known as Murder, Inc. during the 1930s and up to the time of his arrest for murder in 1941, for which he was convicted and, in 1944, executed. The Federal Bureau of Narcotics claimed that Weiss and his partner in crime Philip "Little Farvel" Cohen were heavily involved in narcotics trafficking. Although he was indicted on multiple drug charges, Weiss was never sentenced for any of these crimes.

== Career ==
Starting as an enforcer for the labor rackets run by Louis "Lepke" Buchalter in 1923, Weiss rose to become one of Buchalter's most trusted associates. Weiss was active in Buchalter's lucrative garment industry rackets. Once Buchalter and Jacob Shapiro became fugitives from justice in 1937, Weiss took over the post as the acting general manager and was left in charge of payrolls and finance. Buchalter continued to direct the outfit regardless.

== The Dutch Schultz murder ==
Weiss personally took part in a number of high-profile contract killings for the National Crime Syndicate. On October 23, 1935, he and Charles "the Bug" Workman walked into the Palace Chophouse in Newark, New Jersey, to murder Dutch Schultz. Weiss went up to the barman and waiters and requested them to lie down on the floor. At the same time, Workman walked past Weiss and opened fire on Schultz and his three associates. All of them were fatally injured and died of their bullet wounds within a few hours or days.

Immediately after the shootings, Weiss, fearing the imminent arrival of police, fled the scene and jumped into the waiting getaway car. He ordered their getaway driver, Seymour "Piggy" Schechter, to drive off without Workman, who was still finishing off Schultz in the restaurant's restroom. As a result of his being left behind, Workman was forced to travel back toward New York alone, on foot.

The next day, Workman filed a complaint to the "board" of Murder, Inc. that he had been abandoned by Weiss and Piggy at the murder scene, an offense punishable by death. Weiss defended himself by arguing that Workman had returned to the men's room not for the purpose of making sure the job had been completed, as Workman claimed, but simply for the purpose of stealing Schultz's money and other belongings. Therefore, argued Weiss, the job was already done and Workman had chosen to remain at the scene strictly for selfish personal reasons, thereby jeopardizing their escape and increasing their risk of capture. In the end it was Louis Buchalter who was able to save his lieutenant Weiss from being killed by the mob.

== The Joseph Rosen murder case ==
On September 13, 1936, Weiss, along with Louis Capone, Sholem Bernstein, Philip "Little Farvel" Cohen, James Ferraco and Harry "Pittsburgh Phil" Strauss, took part in the murder of Brownsville, Brooklyn candy store owner Joseph Rosen. Buchalter had ordered the murder in order to prevent Rosen, whom Buchalter had earlier forced out of the garment trucking business, from making good on a threat to expose Buchalter and his rackets to prosecutor Thomas E. Dewey.

Previously unpublished crime scene photos of the Rosen candy store murder appear in the book New York City Gangland. This crime eventually proved to be the undoing of Buchalter, Weiss, and Louis Capone, a Buchalter lieutenant who helped to set up and carry out the murder.

== Arrest and conviction ==
The Rosen murder went unsolved for nearly four years. Since the police knew of no connections between Rosen and the mob, and knew of no enemies Rosen may have had, police had no leads at first. In 1940, police learned of the mob link to the slaying, when Abe "Kid Twist" Reles, a fellow Murder, Inc. enforcer, turned informant for Brooklyn district attorney William O'Dwyer. Reles implicated Weiss and colleagues in this murder and helped police clear up numerous other unsolved murders as mob hits.

Fleeing to Kansas City, Weiss, under the name of James W. Bell, posed as a mining company executive. In April 1941, Weiss was arrested by narcotic agents of the Federal Bureau of Narcotics and returned to New York, where he was formally charged with Rosen's murder.

In late 1941, Buchalter, Weiss and Capone stood trial by jury, in the Brooklyn courtroom of Judge Franklin Taylor, for the first-degree murder of Joseph Rosen. The information provided by Reles and other mob turncoats, such as Allie "Tick-Tock" Tannenbaum and Max Rubin, resulted in a guilty verdict and a death sentence for each of the three defendants. On Saturday night, March 4, 1944, Weiss, Capone and Buchalter were executed by electric chair at Sing Sing for the Rosen murder.

Weiss's last words before his execution were:

“I’m here on a framed-up case. And Governor Dewey knows it. I want to thank Judge Lehman...He knows me because I am a Jew. Give my love to my family...and everything.”

He was buried at Mount Hebron Cemetery in Flushing, Queens.

== Depictions in fiction ==
Weiss was portrayed by Joseph Bernard in the 1960 film Murder, Inc.

== See also ==
- Capital punishment in New York (state)
- Capital punishment in the United States
- List of people executed in New York
- List of people executed in the United States in 1944
