= Murder of Davis Timmerman =

1941 murder case in South Carolina

- Location: Timmerman's store, Edgefield County, South Carolina
- Date: September 17, 1941
- Attack type: Shooting
- Perpetrators: Clarence Bagwell; George Reed Logue; Sue Belle Stidham Logue; Joe Frank Logue
- Motive: Revenge
- Convictions: Murder

The murder of Davis Timmerman occurred on September 17, 1941, in Edgefield County, South Carolina. Initially, there were no suspects, and police suspected that the murder was committed by a stranger who ambushed Timmerman in his store. However, a two-month investigation led to the arrests of Clarence Bagwell, George Logue, Logue's sister-in-law Sue Stidham Logue, and Sue's nephew Joe Frank Logue, who were accused of planning and committing Timmerman's murder in retaliation for the self-defense shooting of George Logue's brother and Sue Logue's husband, John Wallace Logue. Timmerman was acquitted of murder for killing John Wallace Logue the prior year. Additionally, George and Sue Logue's arrests resulted in the deaths of three men, two law enforcement officers and a civilian, as George Logue engaged in a gun battle with the people who attempted to arrest them.

Timmerman's murder, and the ensuing trials of the four suspects, garnered significant press, especially within South Carolina; much of the retrospective attention around this case has centered around Sue Logue's personal life, as she was one of Strom Thurmond's lovers. All four suspects were convicted of Timmerman's murder and sentenced to death, and three – George Logue, Sue Logue, and Clarence Bagwell – were executed on January 15, 1943. Sue Logue's execution made her the first woman to be put to death in South Carolina's electric chair.

After the executions, George and Sue Logue's nephew, Joe Frank Logue, was tried, convicted, and sentenced to death for his involvement in Timmerman's murder. An hour before his scheduled execution, after having undergone the preparations for an electrocution, Joe Frank Logue received a commutation since he had been promised leniency in exchange for his cooperation with the authorities.

== Background ==
=== Involved parties' early lives ===
Davis Way Timmerman was born on April 18, 1899, in Edgefield County. Before his death, Timmerman owned a filling station and was reportedly wealthy; his family was considered "very prominent" in their area. He was married to a woman named Cornelia (née Watson).

Sue Belle Stidham was born in Saluda County, South Carolina, in April 1899. When she was eleven years old, her mother died.

John Wallace Logue was born in Edgefield County on December 13, 1896. John Wallace and Sue Logue were already married by the time he was drafted to serve in the United States military during World War I. They had one child, a daughter born on December 27, 1930; the infant, who was born prematurely, died three hours after birth.

Clarence Bagwell was born in Brevard, North Carolina, likely around 1908 or 1909. He was married to Flora Bagwell and was a plasterer.

George Reed Logue was born on June 1, 1888, in the town of Edgefield, South Carolina. He was the brother of John Wallace Logue, the brother-in-law of Sue Logue, and the uncle of Joe Frank Logue. He never married.

Joseph Frank Logue Jr. was born on September 11, 1908, in the town of Edgefield, South Carolina. Joe Frank's father died on September 26, 1924, shortly after the boy turned 16. Joe Frank's Aunt Sue and his uncles, John Wallace, and George Logue, helped raise him which made him feel indebted and loyal to them. By the time of Timmerman's murder, Joseph Frank Logue was married and worked as a police officer in Spartanburg, South Carolina.

By 1940, the Logues lived in a farmhouse with John Wallace's mother and his brother, George Logue. The Logues' farmhouse was located close to Timmerman's. For several years leading up to 1940, when tensions reached a head with J. Wallace Logue's death, the Logues and the Timmerman family had a long-standing feud.

=== Death of John Wallace Logue and acquittal of Davis Timmerman ===
In September 1940, one of Timmerman's mules wandered into a field belonging to J. Wallace Logue. Timmerman's mule kicked one of Logue's calves to death. Logue requested $20 as compensation for the dead calf, and Timmerman agreed to pay it. On September 30, upon visiting Timmerman's filling station to request the money, Logue doubled his request to $40, and Timmerman refused to pay, after which Logue began attacking Timmerman with an axe handle for sale in the store. Timmerman retreated behind the store counter where he retrieved a gun from a drawer and shot Logue twice, killing him. Badly injured, Timmerman locked up the store and drove to the town of Edgefield, South Carolina, to report the killing to the local sheriff.

After the sheriff, county coroner, and solicitor reviewed the scene of Logue's death at Timmerman's store, Timmerman was arrested and charged with Logue's murder. Between Timmerman's arrest and trial, Logue's widow Sue and her brother-in-law, George Logue, invited Joe Frank to their house repeatedly. Joe Frank would drive several hours to get to Edgefield County; during these visits, as Joe Frank would later tell police, both Sue and George Logue repeatedly expressed a desire to avenge John Wallace's death by killing Timmerman. Joe Frank reported specifically hearing Sue Logue saying, "I will kill Davis Timmerman or see that he is killed."

At trial in March 1941, Timmerman argued that he shot Logue in self-defense. The jury accepted his argument and acquitted him of Logue's murder. Witnesses at the trial reported that when Logue's widow, Sue Logue, heard the verdict being read, she again vowed to avenge her husband's death.

== Murder of Davis Timmerman ==
Between March and July 1941, Sue, George, and Joe Frank Logue visited Fred Dorn, a sharecropper who worked on the Logues' farm, to propose the idea of murdering Timmerman. Weeks later, an African American man who was one of Timmerman's hired hands was shot to death with a rifle; although the murder was never prosecuted or solved, locals suspected the Logues, specifically George Logue, and Fred Dorn were involved.

In July 1941, Sue and George Logue visited Joe Frank in Spartanburg. During this visit, Sue gave Joe Frank US$500 under the condition that Joe Frank would find someone to kill Timmerman. When Joe Frank resisted, Sue allegedly told him that Fred Dorn had been unable to kill Timmerman and started threatening Joe Frank that "something will happen to your mother and your wife" if he did not cooperate. Days later, Joe Frank met with Clarence Bagwell, a 34-year-old painter and known criminal from Spartanburg, and proposed the idea of murdering Timmerman; during another meeting one week later, Bagwell agreed to shoot Timmerman under the condition that Joe Frank Logue pay him $500.

On September 16, 1941, Joe Frank Logue purchased the murder weapon from a pawn shop and gave it to Clarence Bagwell. On September 17, 1941, Logue and Bagwell scoped out Timmerman's store, during which Bagwell encountered Timmerman's wife Cornelia. At approximately 7:00 pm that same day, Logue and Bagwell returned to Timmerman's store. Logue remained in the car while Bagwell entered the store. Bagwell requested either a pack of gum or cigarettes; when Timmerman turned his back to Bagwell, Bagwell murdered him by shooting him four or five times point-blank with a .38 caliber revolver. Witnesses observed a "stranger" fleeing from the area in a car around the time of Timmerman's murder. Timmerman's body was discovered by his wife, who heard gunshots coming from the vicinity of the store and rushed over to investigate. After the murder, George and Sue Logue paid Bagwell $500.

== Arrests and gunfight ==
Following Timmerman's murder, authorities offered a monetary reward for any information, as they had no viable leads.

In October 1941, two natives of Augusta, Georgia, named Jesse L. James and Jimmie Kitchen, both of whom were in their 20s, were wrongfully arrested in Fort Smith, Arkansas, for the murder of Davis Timmerman. Edgefield County Sheriff Wad D. Allen, who was a cousin of George and Sue Logue, transported the men to Edgefield, although he refused to provide information explaining why he thought James and Kitchen were involved in Timmerman's murder. Allen also filed murder charges against James.

In mid-November 1941, Bagwell either got into an argument with his girlfriend, or drunkenly told her that he was involved in a murder; afterwards, his girlfriend went to the police station and reported that Bagwell was the actual culprit behind Timmerman's murder. Bagwell was promptly arrested, after which Timmerman's widow identified him as the man she had seen casing the store the day before. Her identification led to Bagwell confessing to the murders; he implicated Joe Frank Logue in the murders as well, confessing that Logue had hired him, and one of Logue's colleagues reported that he had substituted for Logue on the night of the murders. After Bagwell's confession, Logue was arrested as well on November 9, although at the time, he denied any involvement in Timmerman's murder; nevertheless, the two were transported to the South Carolina Penitentiary for safekeeping.

Following the arrests of Logue and Bagwell, Jesse James and Jimmie Kitchen were exonerated and released from custody.

After consulting with his attorney, Joe Frank Logue decided to confess to his involvement in Timmerman's murder. His confession implicated George and Sue Logue as accessories to the murder.

=== Gunfight ===
On November 16, 1941, Sheriff Allen, who was unarmed, approached the Logues' farmhouse with Deputy William L. Clark, who was armed. The two intended to arrest the Logues, but as they entered the house, George Logue and Fred Dorn began shooting at them. Sheriff Allen died at the scene, while Deputy Clark returned fire, injuring George Logue and fatally wounding Fred Dorn, who was pronounced dead six hours later, after being transported to a hospital. Clark, who was wounded, was rushed to a hospital in Augusta, Georgia, where he died on November 18.

As word of the standoff spread, local citizens arrived with guns and stood with police, surrounding the house and yelling at the occupants to come out and face justice for attacking Allen and Clark. Local district judge Strom Thurmond, a well known and respected figure in the community, who also had a secret affair with Sue Logue, approached the Logues' farm, and made his way through the crowd and to the back door of the residence, where he was able to enter peacefully. He convinced George and Sue Logue to end the standoff and surrender to the law officers outside. Clarence Bagwell, as well as Sue and George Logue were then transported to the South Carolina Penitentiary.

== Perpetrators' trials and executions ==
In early January 1942, the attorneys representing the Logues and Bagwell announced their intentions to motion for a change of venue.

The trials for George Logue, Sue Logue, and Clarence Bagwell took place in 1942 over the course of three days. The change of venue was granted, causing the trial to take place in Lexington County, South Carolina. Their jury only deliberated for two hours before returning guilty verdicts and sentencing all three to death.

=== Executions ===
Randall Johnson, a driver who worked at the State House, transported Strom Thurmond to the women's penitentiary, where Sue Logue was being held as she awaited her execution. Thurmond had volunteered to personally transport her to the South Carolina Penitentiary where her execution would take place. Johnson later attested that Thurmond and Logue spent the trip having sexual relations in the back of the car.

On January 15, 1943, Sue Logue, George Logue, and Clarence Bagwell were executed in South Carolina's electric chair, in that order. The executions took place at approximately 7:00 am. Sue Logue's execution made her the first woman, albeit not the only one, to be executed in South Carolina's electric chair.

== Aftermath ==
Following the executions of Clarence Bagwell and Sue and George Logue, Bagwell's body was transported to a funeral home, after which his family had him buried in Spartanburg's Oakwood Cemetery.

Joe Frank Logue went on trial after the executions of his co-conspirators had been completed. He was convicted, found guilty, and sentenced to death. His execution was scheduled to take place on January 23, 1944. However, after Logue ate his last meal and had otherwise been prepared for execution, Governor Johnston visited Logue on death row and spoke to him. The visit convinced Johnston to commute Joe Frank Logue's sentence to life imprisonment. Joe Frank Logue had been promised leniency in exchange for his cooperation with the authorities.

After his commutation, Logue worked in prison training and handling bloodhounds. He was released on parole in 1960 after 37 out of 40 South Carolina state sheriffs advocated for his release.

== See also ==
- Capital punishment in South Carolina
- List of people executed in South Carolina (pre-1972)
- List of people executed in the United States in 1943
