= Adriano Domingo =

Executed Hawaiian murderer

- Born: 1910 or 1911; Philippines
- Died: January 7, 1944 (aged 33); Oahu Prison, Oahu, Territory of Hawaii
- Cause of death: Execution by hanging
- Status: Executed
- Motive: Victim spurned his advances
- Conviction: First degree murder
- Penalty: Death

Details
- Victims: Helen R. Sakamoto, 21
- Date: August 3, 1943

Adriano Domingo (1910 or 1911 – January 7, 1944) was the final civilian executed by the Territory of Hawaii prior to their abolition of the death penalty in 1957. Domingo was sentenced to death and hanged for the murder of Helen R. Sakamoto, a 21-year-old Japanese American secretary, in Kauai on August 3, 1943. Although Domingo's execution made him the final civilian executed by the Territory of Hawaii, there were several executions that took place there during and after World War II for military crimes, some of which were not committed in Hawaii.

== Early life ==
Domingo was born in 1910 or 1911 in the Philippines. At the time of the 1930 United States census, he was unmarried and living in Koloa, Hawaii, with a romantic partner named Igiton Gomo.

== Murder ==
On August 3, 1943, 21-year-old Helen R. Sakamoto, a secretary, was walking through a sugarcane field near her home on Kauai when Domingo waylaid her and made a romantic overture. When Sakamoto rejected him, Domingo attempted to rape her before he procured a pair of scissors and stabbed her to death. Her body was found hours later after a search, which her father, Junichi Sakamoto, started and led after Sakamoto failed to return home at her expected time.

== Apprehension and trial ==
Domingo was arrested soon afterwards and in custody by August 5. On August 12, a grand jury returned an indictment against Domingo for first-degree murder, to which Domingo, through his court-appointed attorney, pleaded not guilty the next day.

Domingo's trial began on August 30, 1943, and lasted until September 11. Domingo's attorney attempted an insanity defense, but an 11-man jury deliberated for two and a half hours before finding Domingo guilty of Sakamoto's murder. On September 16, Judge Philip L. Rice formally sentenced Domingo to death.

== Execution ==
Sometime before his execution, Domingo faced a sanity commission; the commission certified that Domingo was not criminally insane and was thus eligible for execution. On December 24, the board which had led the sanity commission sent their findings to Hawaii's territorial governor, Ingram Stainback. Five days later, Stainback signed Domingo's death warrant, scheduling his execution to take place on January 7, 1944, between 8:00 a.m. and 5:00 p.m. In his statement announcing that he had signed Domingo's death warrant, Stainback said that after reviewing Domingo's case and the findings of the sanity commission, he could find no mitigating circumstance that would warrant interfering with Domingo's conviction or death sentence.

Domingo spent his last moments with Rev. Father Valentin H. Franckx, the Oahu Prison chaplain. Afterwards, Domingo was led to the gallows, where he was asked for a last statement. He refused to speak. The rope was placed around Domingo's neck at 8:08 a.m. and the trap door on the gallows opened soon afterwards; a prison doctor pronounced him dead at 8:27 a.m. No family members claimed Domingo's body after the execution, so he was buried in the prison cemetery.

== Abolition of the death penalty in Hawaii ==
Although Domingo was the final civilian executed by the Territory of Hawaii prior to the death penalty's abolition, he was not the final person executed while in Hawaii, as several executions by the U.S. military, carried out for military crimes, took place there by hanging and firing squad during and after World War II, until 1947. There were three military executions in Hawaii – two by hanging and one by firing squad – between 1945 and 1947. The last one was the hanging of 19-year-old Pvt. Garlon Mickles on April 22, 1947, for a rape committed in Guam months prior.

The Territory of Hawaii abolished the death penalty in 1957.

== See also ==
- List of people executed in the United States in 1944
