= Mr. Arsenic =

1952 American television series

Mr. Arsenic is a 30-minute American anthology television series featuring stories that provided detailed information on crimes and criminals from current headlines. It was hosted by Burton Turkus, author of Murder, Inc., The Story of the Syndicate. A total of eight episodes aired on the ABC network. It aired on Thursdays at 9:00 p.m., from May 8, 1952, to June 26, 1952.
