= List of people executed in the United States in 1943 =

One hundred and thirty-eight people—one hundred and thirty-sixty male and two female—were executed in the United States in 1943: ninety-seven by electrocution, twenty-six by gas chamber, fourteen by hanging, and one by firing squad.

== List of people executed in the United States in 1943 ==
No.	Date of execution	Name	Age of person			Gender	Ethnicity	State	Method	Ref.
No.	Date of execution	Name	At execution	At offense	Age difference	Gender	Ethnicity	State	Method	Ref.
1	January 1, 1943	Daniel Phillips	29	29	0	Male	Black	North Carolina	Gas chamber	
2	January 1, 1943	Rosanna Lightner Phillips	25	25	0	Female	Black	North Carolina	Gas chamber	
3	January 7, 1943	Sam Porter	Unknown	Unknown	Unknown	Male	Black	Mississippi	Electrocution	
4	January 8, 1943	Grady B. Cole	28	27	1	Male	Black	Arizona	Gas chamber	
5	January 8, 1943	J. C. Levice	22	21	1	Male	Black	Arizona	Gas chamber	
6	January 8, 1943	Charles Sanders	20	19	1	Male	Black	Arizona	Gas chamber	
7	January 14, 1943	Edmund Sileo	28	26	2	Male	White	New York	Electrocution	
8	January 14, 1943	Joseph Sonsky	33	24	9	Male	White	New York	Electrocution	
9	January 15, 1943	Jarvis Theodore Roosevelt Catoe	38	36	2	Male	Black	District of Columbia	Electrocution	
10	January 15, 1943	Raymond Dowdell	31	26	5	Male	Black	Georgia	Electrocution	
11	January 15, 1943	McCoy Combs	21	19	2	Male	White	Kentucky	Electrocution	
12	January 15, 1943	Burnett Sexton	18	17	1	Male	White	Kentucky	Electrocution	
13	January 15, 1943	James Gilliam	40	38	2	Male	Black	Maryland	Hanging	
14	January 15, 1943	Sue Belle Logue	46	45	1	Female	White	South Carolina	Electrocution	
15	January 15, 1943	George Reed Logue	54	53	1	Male	White	South Carolina	Electrocution	
16	January 15, 1943	Clarence King Bagwell	34	33	1	Male	White	South Carolina	Electrocution	
17	January 18, 1943	Forrest Saylor	35	35	0	Male	Black	Florida	Electrocution	
18	January 19, 1943	Jerry Sykes	26	25	1	Male	Black	U.S. military	Hanging	
19	January 21, 1943	Frank Castellano	26	25	1	Male	White	New York	Electrocution	
20	January 21, 1943	Angelo Mendez	30	21	9	Male	Hispanic	New York	Electrocution	
21	January 22, 1943	Leslie Bela Gireth	39	38	1	Male	White	California	Gas chamber	
22	January 29, 1943	Sam Hairston	22	21	1	Male	Black	North Carolina	Gas chamber	
23	January 30, 1943	Hugh Pierre	34	28	6	Male	Black	Louisiana	Electrocution	
24	February 4, 1943	Richard Smith	24	20	4	Male	Black	Georgia	Electrocution	
25	February 5, 1943	Robert Walter Avery	34	32	2	Male	White	Utah	Firing squad	
26	February 12, 1943	Luther Lee Cooper	23	21	2	Male	White	Mississippi	Electrocution	
27	February 19, 1943	Haywood Bossie	24	24	0	Male	Black	Alabama	Electrocution	
28	February 19, 1943	James Corbett Rawlins	46	46	0	Male	White	Arizona	Gas chamber	
29	February 19, 1943	Palmer Ray Meares	34	34	0	Male	White	North Carolina	Gas chamber	
30	February 19, 1943	Leo Lera	33	29	4	Male	White	Texas	Electrocution	
31	February 23, 1943	Peter Gurski	25	25	0	Male	White	Connecticut	Electrocution	
32	February 26, 1943	Robert H. Anderson	37	36	1	Male	White	Kentucky	Electrocution	
33	February 26, 1943	Raymond S. Baxter	29	27	2	Male	White	Kentucky	Electrocution	
34	February 26, 1943	Thomas Penney	33	32	1	Male	White	Kentucky	Electrocution	
35	February 26, 1943	Ernest Trent	26	24	2	Male	White	Kentucky	Electrocution	
36	February 26, 1943	William E. Wallace	55	54	1	Male	White	Oregon	Gas chamber	
37	March 1, 1943	Vincent J. Christy	38	37	1	Male	White	Florida	Electrocution	
38	March 4, 1943	Harold J. Elling	21	19	2	Male	White	New York	Electrocution	
39	March 12, 1943	Charles Clinton Coates Jr.	29	29	0	Male	White	Georgia	Electrocution	
40	March 12, 1943	James Ford	32	31	1	Male	Black	Maryland	Hanging	
41	March 19, 1943	George Schubert Knapp	38	38	0	Male	White	U.S. military	Hanging	
42	March 19, 1943	Adolph Thomas	35	Unknown	Unknown	Male	Black	Arkansas	Electrocution	
43	March 19, 1943	James Branch Mooring Jr.	22	22	0	Male	Black	Virginia	Electrocution	
44	March 19, 1943	Chester Montgomery	29	26	3	Male	Black	Washington	Hanging	
45	March 23, 1943	Harold Finnon Burks	26	23	3	Male	Black	Louisiana	Electrocution	
46	March 26, 1943	Francis Albert Line	27	27	0	Male	White	U.S. military	Hanging	
47	March 26, 1943	Lewis Wilcoxon	20	17	3	Male	Black	Georgia	Electrocution	
48	March 29, 1943	John Childers	33	32	1	Male	Black	Pennsylvania	Electrocution	
49	March 30, 1943	William Lonas Hedden	44	42	2	Male	White	Tennessee	Electrocution	
50	March 30, 1943	Robert George Cannon	26	25	1	Male	Black	Tennessee	Electrocution	
51	March 31, 1943	William Patrick Jennings	23	22	1	Male	Black	Ohio	Electrocution	
52	April 2, 1943	Jesse Jones	20	19	1	Male	Black	South Carolina	Electrocution	
53	April 6, 1943	Manuel Griffin	33	Unknown	Unknown	Male	Black	Louisiana	Electrocution	
54	April 6, 1943	Roy Willard Jacobs	41	33	8	Male	White	Washington	Hanging	
55	April 16, 1943	John Henry Lee	20	19	1	Male	Black	North Carolina	Gas chamber	
56	April 16, 1943	Finley Porter	40	Unknown	Unknown	Male	Black	Oklahoma	Electrocution	
57	April 20, 1943	Wilson H. Funderburk	38	Unknown	Unknown	Male	Black	Connecticut	Electrocution	
58	April 26, 1943	Henry Lock	43	42	1	Male	Black	Ohio	Electrocution	
59	April 26, 1943	Herbert Green	41	39	2	Male	Black	Pennsylvania	Electrocution	
60	April 27, 1943	Elisandro Lopez Macias	20	18	2	Male	Hispanic	Arizona	Gas chamber	
61	April 29, 1943	John Cullen	45	44	1	Male	White	New York	Electrocution	
62	April 29, 1943	Eli Edward Shonbrun	33	32	1	Male	White	New York	Electrocution	
63	May 14, 1943	Warren S. Cramer	25	24	1	Male	White	California	Gas chamber	
64	May 21, 1943	Lewis Moody	29	28	1	Male	Black	North Carolina	Gas chamber	
65	May 28, 1943	Bernice Franklin	17	17	0	Male	Black	Georgia	Electrocution	
66	May 28, 1943	Joel Luther Palmer	30	30	0	Male	White	Georgia	Electrocution	
67	June 4, 1943	Frank Johnson	24	21	3	Male	Black	Alabama	Electrocution	
68	June 4, 1943	Freeman Holton	22	20	2	Male	Black	Maryland	Hanging	
69	June 4, 1943	Frank Williams	25	23	2	Male	Black	Maryland	Hanging	
70	June 4, 1943	Wilbur Jackson	22	20	2	Male	Black	Maryland	Hanging	
71	June 4, 1943	Bill Bryant	39	38	1	Male	White	North Carolina	Gas chamber	
72	June 4, 1943	Harvey Hunt	21	20	1	Male	Native American	North Carolina	Gas chamber	
73	June 4, 1943	Purcell Smith	22	21	1	Male	Native American	North Carolina	Gas chamber	
74	June 10, 1943	Mose Sims	23	22	1	Male	Black	Georgia	Electrocution	
75	June 18, 1943	James Utley	24	23	1	Male	Black	North Carolina	Gas chamber	
76	June 25, 1943	William Carson Gray	18	17	1	Male	Black	Kentucky	Electrocution	
77	June 25, 1943	Archie Simpson	21	20	1	Male	Black	Kentucky	Electrocution	
78	June 25, 1943	Robert Hayward Gray	35	34	1	Male	Black	Massachusetts	Electrocution	
79	June 25, 1943	Donald Millard	21	19	2	Male	White	Massachusetts	Electrocution	
80	June 25, 1943	Joseph E. Sheppard	25	23	2	Male	White	Massachusetts	Electrocution	
81	June 25, 1943	O'Neal Williams	18	18	0	Male	Black	Mississippi	Electrocution	
82	June 30, 1943	Anthony Treat	58	57	1	Male	White	Ohio	Electrocution	
83	July 6, 1943	Herman Carter	Unknown	Unknown	0	Male	Black	Louisiana	Electrocution	
84	July 6, 1943	George Washington	Unknown	Unknown	1	Male	Black	Louisiana	Electrocution	
85	July 8, 1943	Benitez DeJesus	19	18	1	Male	Hispanic	New York	Electrocution	
86	July 8, 1943	Edward Haight	17	16	1	Male	White	New York	Electrocution	
87	July 8, 1943	William Diaz	18	18	0	Male	Hispanic	New York	Electrocution	
88	July 14, 1943	Hiram Prather	35	33	2	Male	White	Oklahoma	Electrocution	
89	July 15, 1943	Alfred Haynes	26	25	1	Male	Black	New York	Electrocution	
90	July 15, 1943	James Felix Tucker	31	29	2	Male	White	Tennessee	Electrocution	
91	July 15, 1943	Marshall Spigner	45	44	1	Male	White	Tennessee	Electrocution	
92	July 16, 1943	Sylvester McKinney	21	20	1	Male	Black	South Carolina	Electrocution	
93	July 16, 1943	Johnnie Sims	17	16	1	Male	Black	South Carolina	Electrocution	
94	July 19, 1943	Edmund Reed	26	25	1	Male	Black	Georgia	Electrocution	
95	July 21, 1943	Arthur Lee Wilson	24	23	1	Male	Black	Texas	Electrocution	
96	July 26, 1943	Levi Brandon	23	22	1	Male	Black	U.S. military	Hanging	
97	August 6, 1943	Walter J. Bohn	26	26	0	Male	White	U.S. military	Hanging	
98	August 6, 1943	Leroy Goldsmith	38	Unknown	Unknown	Male	Black	Alabama	Electrocution	
99	August 6, 1943	Harry Thompson	44	43	1	Male	Black	Arkansas	Electrocution	
100	August 10, 1943	Adel Johnson	21	20	1	Male	Black	Georgia	Electrocution	
101	August 13, 1943	Henry Daniels Jr.	20	18	2	Male	Black	Alabama	Electrocution	
102	August 13, 1943	Curtis Robinson	20	18	2	Male	Black	Alabama	Electrocution	
103	August 13, 1943	John Lawrence Coleman	50	48	2	Male	White	California	Gas chamber	
104	August 13, 1943	John Lampkin	19	19	0	Male	Black	Maryland	Hanging	
105	August 14, 1943	James Clyde Arwood	41	40	1	Male	White	Federal government	Electrocution	
106	August 20, 1943	Marlin Hancock	43	42	1	Male	White	Georgia	Electrocution	
107	August 20, 1943	Eugene Pittman	28	27	1	Male	Black	Georgia	Electrocution	
108	August 20, 1943	John Thomas Russell	27	26	1	Male	Black	Georgia	Electrocution	
109	August 20, 1943	Charlie Sexton	16	16	0	Male	Black	Georgia	Electrocution	
110	August 31, 1943	John Richard	60	Unknown	Unknown	Male	Black	Louisiana	Electrocution	
111	September 3, 1943	Rex Beard Jr.	20	19	1	Male	White	Texas	Electrocution	
112	September 10, 1943	Phillip J. Coleman Jr.	24	24	0	Male	Black	Montana	Hanging	
113	September 15, 1943	Ervin Griffin	19	18	1	Male	Black	Ohio	Electrocution	
114	September 16, 1943	Anibal Almodovar	21	20	1	Male	Hispanic	New York	Electrocution	
115	September 20, 1943	John Sullivan	54	52	2	Male	White	Colorado	Gas chamber	
116	September 24, 1943	Serina Hodo	23	23	0	Male	Black	Georgia	Electrocution	
117	October 1, 1943	Joseph C. Williams	22	Unknown	Unknown	Male	Black	Mississippi	Electrocution	
118	October 4, 1943	Cornelius Earnest Parker	24	24	0	Male	Black	Florida	Electrocution	
119	October 4, 1943	Edward James Ralph	32	32	0	Male	White	Ohio	Electrocution	
120	October 8, 1943	George Masayoshi Honda	38	36	2	Male	Asian	Colorado	Gas chamber	
121	October 8, 1943	William Henry Poole	30	29	1	Male	Black	North Carolina	Gas chamber	
122	October 15, 1943	Harry Edward Farris	28	26	2	Male	White	Virginia	Electrocution	
123	October 22, 1943	Tommie Lee Mathis	23	22	1	Male	Black	Georgia	Electrocution	
124	October 23, 1943	Robert Williams	20	Unknown	Unknown	Male	Black	Georgia	Electrocution	
125	October 25, 1943	Ruffie Lundon	44	Unknown	Unknown	Male	Black	Florida	Electrocution	
126	October 25, 1943	James Allen Young	32	31	1	Male	Black	Florida	Electrocution	
127	October 29, 1943	George Washington James	54	53	1	Male	Black	Florida	Electrocution	
128	October 29, 1943	Willie Smith	47	46	1	Male	Black	North Carolina	Gas chamber	
129	October 29, 1943	Delores Quiroz	31	Unknown	Unknown	Male	Hispanic	Texas	Electrocution	
130	November 19, 1943	Sam Osborne	19	17	2	Male	Black	South Carolina	Electrocution	
131	November 22, 1943	James Perry Acree	32	30	2	Male	White	Florida	Electrocution	
132	November 26, 1943	Ernest Emory Wishon	35	34	1	Male	White	Illinois	Electrocution	
133	November 26, 1943	John Willie Redfern	40	Unknown	Unknown	Male	Black	North Carolina	Gas chamber	
134	November 27, 1943	Floyd L. McKinney	34	33	1	Male	White	Nevada	Gas chamber	
135	December 10, 1943	Clyde Morris Grass	32	31	1	Male	White	North Carolina	Gas chamber	
136	December 11, 1943	S. A. Ellison	17	17	0	Male	Black	Georgia	Electrocution	
137	December 15, 1943	Robert Hall	50	49	1	Male	Black	Tennessee	Electrocution	
138	December 31, 1943	H. T. Johnson	22	21	1	Male	Black	Georgia	Electrocution	

== Demographics ==
Gender
Male	132	99%
Female	2	1%
Ethnicity
Black	78	57%
White	52	38%
Hispanic	6	4%
Native American	2	1%
Asian	1	1%
State
Georgia	18	13%
North Carolina	14	10%
New York	12	9%
Kentucky	8	6%
Florida	7	5%
South Carolina	7	5%
Louisiana	6	4%
Maryland	6	4%
Alabama	5	4%
Arizona	5	4%
Ohio	5	4%
Tennessee	5	4%
U.S. military	5	4%
Mississippi	4	3%
Texas	4	3%
California	3	2%
Massachusetts	3	2%
Arkansas	2	1%
Colorado	2	1%
Connecticut	2	1%
Oklahoma	2	1%
Pennsylvania	2	1%
Virginia	2	1%
Washington	2	1%
District of Columbia	1	1%
Federal government	1	1%
Illinois	1	1%
Montana	1	1%
Nevada	1	1%
Oregon	1	1%
Utah	1	1%
Method
Electrocution	97	70%
Gas chamber	26	19%
Hanging	14	10%
Firing squad	1	1%
Month
January	23	17%
February	13	9%
March	15	11%
April	11	8%
May	4	3%
June	16	12%
July	14	10%
August	14	10%
September	6	4%
October	13	9%
November	5	4%
December	4	3%
Age
Unknown	3	2%
10–19	12	9%
20–29	63	46%
30–39	36	26%
40–49	16	12%
50–59	7	5%
60–69	1	1%
Total	138	100%

== Executions in recent years ==
Number of executions
1944	120
1943	138
1942	148
Total	406

Preceded by 1942	List of people executed in the United States in 1943	Succeeded by 1944
