= Burton Turkus =

American lawyer (1902-82)

Burton B. Turkus (December 2, 1902 – November 22, 1982) was an attorney and arbitrator best known for prosecuting members of the Brooklyn gang known as "Murder, Inc.".

He served as assistant district attorney and chief of the Homicide Division in the Office of the District Attorney, Kings County (Brooklyn).

== Career ==
As an assistant district attorney in Brooklyn in 1940, Turkus interrogated mobster Abe Reles, who had been arrested for murder. Reles became a government informant who revealed the existence of a violent gang of racketeers in the Brownsville section of Brooklyn. The group was named "Murder Inc." by the press. Reles's revelations led to numerous other prosecutions. Turkus prosecuted Murder Inc. and sent seven of its members to the electric chair. He was later an arbitrator and a member of the State Board of Mediation.

In the early 1950s, Turkus became host of the TV series Mr. Arsenic. He also wrote about his experiences in a book entitled Murder Inc. (1951) and was portrayed in the 1960 movie about Murder Inc. by Henry Morgan. In 2012 Murder Inc. was republished by Tenacity Media Books, an imprint of investigative reporter Peter Lance. In the forward to this, Lance describes how his examination of the FBI's counter-terrorism investigations that began when he was a reporter for ABC News' Nightline had been informed by the Turkus book and later led him to discover an extraordinary link between the FBI and a 1996 Bureau sting of an al Qaeda terrorist involved in 9/11.

The Burton Turkus Papers, which document his career, are housed in the Lloyd Sealy Library Special Collections at John Jay College of Criminal Justice. Many photographs from his papers have been digitized in the Lloyd Sealy Library Digital Collections. Additional documents and papers relating to the career of Burton Turkus can also be found at the Brooklyn Collection, Brooklyn Public Library's local history division.

Turkus appeared on the CBS television program, I've Got a Secret, on the June 29, 1960 episode. His secret was, “Henry Morgan plays me in a movie (We’ve never met)”.
