= Murder, Inc. (1960 film) =

1960 film by Stuart Rosenberg

- Title from the trailer
- Directed by: Burt Balaban and Stuart Rosenberg
- Screenplay by: Irve Tunick and Mel Barr
- Based on: the book "Murder, Inc." by Burton Turkus and Sid Feder
- Produced by: Burt Balaban
- Starring: Stuart Whitman; May Britt; Henry Morgan; Peter Falk
- Cinematography: Gayne Rescher, A.S.C.
- Edited by: Ralph Rosenblum
- Music by: Frank DeVol
- Production company: Princess Productions
- Distributed by: 20th Century-Fox
- Release date: June 28, 1960
- Running time: 103 minutes
- Country: United States
- Language: English
- Budget: $750,000

Murder, Inc. is a 1960 American gangster film starring Stuart Whitman, May Britt, Henry Morgan and Peter Falk. Filmed in Cinemascope and directed by Burt Balaban and Stuart Rosenberg, the film was based on the true story of Murder, Inc., a Brooklyn gang that operated in the 1930s.

Falk was nominated for an Academy Award for Best Supporting Actor for his first major feature role as Abe Reles, a vicious thug who led the Murder, Inc. gang and was believed to have committed 30 murders, for which he was never prosecuted. In his 2006 autobiography Just One More Thing, Falk said that Murder, Inc. launched his career.

This was the first film directed by Rosenberg, who later won acclaim for Cool Hand Luke (1967), and it launched Stuart Whitman's career as a leading man.

A highly fictionalized film on the same basic events titled The Enforcer (1951), starring Humphrey Bogart, was released in the United Kingdom with the title Murder, Inc.

== Prologue ==
"This happened in Brooklyn, The city of churches. The time was the mid – thirties"
"The story is factual. The people are real."

== Plot summary ==
Abe Reles and his accomplice Bug Workman, two cold-blooded killers from Brooklyn's Brownsville district, go to the Garment District to meet with Louis "Lepke" Buchalter, leader of the organized crime mob Murder, Inc., who offers them jobs as hit men. After hiring them to kill Catskills resort owner Walter Sage for withholding slot machine profits from the syndicate, Lepke designates Emanuel "Mendy" Weiss, his assistant, as Reles' contact. Reles coerces struggling singer Joey Collins, an old friend of Sage indebted to Reles, with veiled threats, and Joey agrees to accompany him to the Catskills, where he draws an unsuspecting Sage out into the street and into Reles' murderous hands.

Upon their return to the city, Reles visits Joey at the apartment he shares with his dancer wife Eadie and coldly announces that he will kill them if they tell anyone about what happened. Aghast, she denounces him and throws him out. Later, at a soda shop, Lieutenant William Flaherty Tobin, a local police detective determined to end the syndicate's reign of terror, arrests him and takes him to the station house for questioning. When they arrive, however, Lepke's attorney Lazlo orders for Reles' release. Resentful towards Eadie, Reles returns while Joey is away and brutally rapes her. When Joey returns, the beaten and disheveled Eadie begs him to escape with her, but he declines out of fear, and she hysterically insists that he leave.

Under Lepke's direction, Reles continues his murderous campaign. One day, at the nightclub in which Eadie performs, he asks her to reconcile with Joey, before taking her to a luxurious apartment filled with stolen goods and offering it to the couple for free. A grand jury impaneled by special prosecutor Thomas E. Dewey soon convenes, forcing Lepke to hide at the couple's dwelling. Lepke soon takes control, mistreating and constantly berating Eadie. He instructs Mendy to personally kill Joe Rosen, a shop owner he had beaten for failing to pay extortion money, to prevent him from testifying. As the NYPD scours the city for Lepke, crime lord Albert Anastasia informs him that per the syndicate's orders, he must turn himself in on a reduced charge of interstate commerce crime. Lepke reluctantly consents, but rather than the two-year prison term promised by Albert, is sentenced to thirty years in Leavenworth.

District Attorney Burton Turkus takes over the crusade, enlisting Tobin's help in identifying the players. Initially cynical about his ability to withstand political pressure, Tobin eventually agrees. Lepke, concerned about being linked to Rosen's death, orders Mendy to kill the entire Brownsville gang along with Joey and Eadie. Shell-shocked from being dominated by him, she describes living with the killers to Turkus, identifying Mendy as Lepke's right-hand man and the Brownsville gang as his personal squad, and revealing that Reles will arrive that afternoon on the Baltimore train; he puts her in protective custody and goes to the train station to arrest Reles. Later, as Mendy waits menacingly outside the soda shop to kill Joey, Turkus arrives and hauls Joey into the police station, shows him photographs of Bug's murder and warns that he will be next. Upon learning of Reles' arrest, Joey visits him in jail, notifies him of Bug's death and then threatens to testify against him. Fearing incrimination by Joey, Reles relents and, over the next six days, vividly details the organization's activities, including the fact that Joey overheard Lepke order Rosen's murder.

Realizing that Joey's testimony could bring Lepke down, Turkus places Joey and Reles in protective custody at the Half Moon Hotel in Coney Island. Eadie comes there to beg Joey to cooperate, but he reluctantly declines, fearing the mob's retaliation. She tearfully slips out of the hotel, leaving her escort behind, to stroll along a darkened pier, unaware that she is being followed. Suddenly, a man springs from the shadows and strangles her to death. Later that night, an assassin infiltrates a sleeping Reles' room and tosses him out the window, then drapes a sheet from the window to make it look like he died while attempting escape. Just as Turkus' crusade seems lost, Joey avenges his wife's death by testifying against Lepke, who is then executed in the electric chair.

== Closing narration ==
Voice of Henry Morgan (speaking as Burton Turkus): "Lepke was the first of the ganglords to pay up in full in the electric chair. The first and, to date, the one and only. But his execution proves that it can be done, that the kingpins and their rackets can be brought to justice. It can be done. It must be done. Again and again and again."

== Cast ==
=== In opening credits ===
- Starring Stuart Whitman
- May Britt
- And Henry Morgan
- Introducing Peter Falk as Reles
- Also Starring David J. Stewart
- Simon Oakland
- Eli Mintz
- Joseph Bernard
- With Warren Finnerty
- Vincent Gardenia
- Helen Waters
- Leon B. Stevens
- Howard I. Smith
- Sylvia Miles
- Josip Elic
- Lou Polan
- Dorothy Stinnette
- Bill Bassett
- Morey Amsterdam as Walter Sage
- Introducing Sarah Vaughan

=== In closing credits ===
- Stuart Whitman as Joey
- May Britt as Eadie
- Henry Morgan as Turkus
- Peter Falk as Reles
- David J. Stewart as Lepke
- Simon Oakland as Tobin
- Sarah Vaughan as Singer
- Morey Amsterdam as Sage
- Eli Mintz as Joe Rosen
- Joseph Bernard as Mendy
- Warren Finnerty as "Bug" Workman
- Vincent Gardenia as Lazlo
- Helen Waters as Mrs. Corsi
- Leon B. Stevens as Loughran
- Howard I. Smith as Albert Anastasia
- Sylvia Miles as Sadie

The film was the screen debut of Sylvia Miles and Sarah Vaughan. Seymour Cassel appears as an unbilled extra.

== Songs ==
"The Awakening"
"Hey! Mister"
"Fan My Brow"
Music & Lyrics by George Weiss

== Original book ==
Twentieth Century-Fox based Murder, Inc. on a 1951 book of the same title by Burton Turkus, former district attorney of New York, and Sid Feder.

It is similar in style to the popular TV series The Untouchables, which may have inspired the studio to make the movie.

The story of the Murder, Inc. crime group was first told on the screen in the Warner Brothers film The Enforcer, a semi-fictional film that was released as Murder, Inc. overseas. The film starred Humphrey Bogart, in his last role for the studio, as a crusading district attorney molded after Turkus. A Lepke-type character was played by Everett Sloane. Ted De Corsia played a character loosely based on Reles.

Unlike the factual Murder, Inc., which dealt with a Mafia kingpin's establishment of a contract murder organization within that framework, The Enforcer is fictional and had a freelance group willing to work for anyone in or out of the mob. The 1951 film begins with De Corsia's falling off a ledge despite Bogart's attempt to save him, and includes gruesome scenes based on fact.

== Production ==
The novel was optioned by Burt Balaban's Princess Pictures. Balaban was the son of Paramount executive Barney Balaban. It was made in association with Robert L. Lippert's Associate Productions and 20th Century Fox.

=== Casting ===
Filmed in and around New York City, Murder, Inc. had a cast consisting largely of actors from off-Broadway theater. Peter Falk recalled in his autobiography Just One More Thing that the film was "no big deal for Twentieth Century Fox. They hired second-tier stars, nobody had ever heard of them. The cast of off-Broadway stage actors, including me, came cheap. A few dollars a week and a bag of peanuts."

Stuart Rosenberg, who had been directing for Alfred Hitchcock Presents, was signed to make his feature debut as director.

Robert Evans, who later became head of production at Paramount Pictures Corporation but at the time was a young actor, was offered the part of Reles but turned it down. In an interview with The Guardian in 2002, Evans said:

I was hot as an actor for a few minutes and I turned down parts that got guys nominated for Academy Awards. For example, there was a picture called Murder, Inc. which was to star Stuart Whitman, May Britt and myself. I said "If I'm not going to lead, then I'm not going to play the part." and got a suspension. And they hired an actor who had never been north of 14th Street in New York and had never been to Hollywood – this guy called Peter Falk. And he was nominated for the part that I went on suspension for.

Balaban cast Falk based on his performance in Kraft Mystery Theatre. Falk said that "for me, Murder, Inc. was more than a big deal – it was a miracle. Like being touched from above. Of all the thousands of obscure actors, they picked me." He said Murder, Inc. made his career, and if he had not been cast as Reles, he would not have been cast in his subsequent films A Pocketful of Miracles (1961) and Robin and the Seven Hoods (1964) and would still be working in off-Broadway theater.

=== Shooting ===
Filming started 15 February 1960, occurring at Filmways Studio and on location in Manhattan and Brooklyn.

Falk chose his wardrobe for the film by scouring second-hand clothing stores until he got the right coat and hat, to give him the "East Coast 'wise guy' look". He patterned his performance on would-be gangsters whom he knew in his youth at a pool hall named McGuire's. "I had a real feel for these guys – the way they talked – the gestures – the whole package." Falk said that he rewrote the part and that Rosenberg gave him the latitude to depart from the script.

According to Falk, production of the movie was accelerated because of an impending actor's strike. Rosenberg was fired and replaced by Balaban, who had no directorial experience. Falk said that Balaban "stayed out of the way" while the crew and cast did their jobs. In Bullets Over Hollywood, a 2005 study of gangster movies, film scholar John McCarty stated that the "presence of two helmsmen may explain the uneven qualities of the film", in which scenes of powerful impact are "offset by long expanses of unexciting celluloid".

Filming was to have taken 20 days, but because of the strike, it was decided that it would be filmed in nine days by extending the shooting days from 9 am to 11 pm, working on weekends, and rearranging the schedule. On 27 February 1960, Balaban took over as director from Rosenberg, and Gayne Rescher replaced Joseph Brun as cinematographer.

Production of the movie took place up to the very last moments before the actor's strike. The last scene to be shot was the murder of Walter Sage, portrayed by Morey Amsterdam. Because of the shortage of time, the scene, set in the Catskill Mountains, was shot outside the studio on 126th Street in Harlem, minutes before the start of the strike at midnight.

== Reception ==
=== Critical response ===
New York Times film critic Bosley Crowther dismissed the film as a "new screen telling of an old story". Crowther singled out Falk's "amusingly vicious performance", and that when he appears "there is a certain dark frightfulness and terror" in the film. But "otherwise the traffic is that of an average gangster film that slacks off too much for proper tension and runs a great deal too long." Crowther praised the other leading performances but said that Morgan, a radio and TV personality known mainly for his sharp wit, "does better when he is telling jokes".

Describing Falk's performance, Crowther wrote:

Mr. Falk, moving as if weary, looking at people out of the corners of his eyes and talking as if he had borrowed Marlon Brando's chewing gum, seems a travesty of a killer, until the water suddenly freezes in his eyes and he whips an icepick from his pocket and starts punching holes in someone's ribs. Then viciousness pours out of him and you get a sense of a felon who is hopelessly cracked and corrupt."

More recent reviewers have praised Falk's performance, but have not lavished much praise on the movie, with commentators divided on the film's semi-documentary style. A 1986 study of films as art praised the film's "journalistic thoroughness" and "teledramatic immediacy". Falk's performance, it stated, "is one of the grittiest portrayals of the primitivism of an underworld henchman on film; the supporting relationships of Whitman's cowardly, acquiescent innocent and May Britt's beleaguered wife perversely juxtaposed to the unusual pathos generated by the crime boss and his aide delineate the glumness of the crime world with few concessions to moral righteousness".

In the 1997 book Crime Movies, film historian Carlos Clarens compared Murder, Inc. unfavorably to Samuel Fuller's Underworld USA (1961), released at about the same time, on the grounds that it stuck too closely to the facts. Falk, he wrote, delivered a "miscalculated comic performance" as Reles, and "the power and resonance of The Enforcer was missing, chiefly because the facts tyrannized the weak screenplay". In contrast, the book states Underworld USA was a "free and colorful fiction" that "packed the visual and dramatic wallop of an atrocity photo in the National Enquirer".

DVD Review called Murder, Inc. "an entertaining, if somewhat trifling, piece of violent fluff". It wrote that "Peter Falk walks away with the movie anyway. Falk was nominated for a Best Supporting Actor Academy Award for this film, and it is easy to see why. He imbues his role with the sleazy charisma and rugged charm that would later become his trademark on the long-running 'Columbo.'" Another reviewer wrote in 2001 that "the best thing about the film was Falk's tough-guy performance. Otherwise, everything was routine."

In 2005, film scholar John McCarty praised Falk's performance and David J. Stewart's "reptilian" Lepke, and wrote "the film belongs to Stewart and Falk; as with Daniel Day-Lewis in Gangs of New York, it is mostly when they are on the screen that this minor but engaging docudrama about the mob's ugly but profitable murder-for-hire business really cooks."

The stylistic score by Frank De Vol was well received. It is included in the soundtrack album of the film, released by Canadian-American Records in the same year as the film release.

== Accolades ==
Falk was nominated for the Academy Award for Best Supporting Actor for his performance as Reles. It was the film's only Academy Award nomination.

Falk unsuccessfully campaigned for the award. In a 1997 interview with writer Arthur Marx, Falk said that the idea of campaigning for the award was suggested by Sal Mineo, but that he did not take the idea seriously until it was suggested by Abe Lastfogel, head of the William Morris Agency. He hired a press agent "and what do you know – I got nominated." Falk described what happened at the award ceremonies as follows:

"Now we're in our seats; the press agent, Judd Bernard, is seated on my right. It's my category and I heard a voice say 'And the winner is Peter...I'm rising out of my seat... Ustinov.' I'm heading back down. When I hit the seat, I turn to the press agent: 'You're fired.' I didn't want him charging me for another day."

== See also ==
- List of American films of 1960
