= Phillip Coleman (spree killer) =

Executed American spree killer and suspected serial killer

- Born: Phillip J. Coleman Jr. April 24, 1919; St. Louis, Missouri, U.S.
- Died: September 10, 1943 (aged 24); Missoula County Jail, Montana, U.S.
- Other names: "Slim"; Edward J. Coleman Jr.
- Status: Executed by hanging
- Conviction: First degree murder (2 counts)
- Penalty: Death

Details
- Victims: 3–23
- Span of crimes: July 3 – 24, 1943
- Country: United States and possibly Canada
- States: Montana, possibly others
- Date apprehended: July 28, 1943

Phillip J. Coleman Jr. (April 24, 1919 – September 10, 1943) was an American spree killer and self-confessed serial killer who was convicted of a double murder in Lothrop, Montana committed on July 24, 1943, together with accomplice Louis Brown. On the day of his execution, he published a written confession admitting to 23 total murders across the United States and Canada, providing details for eight of them, including one for which he had been suspected previously but never charged.

Coleman remains the last African-American and final convict to be hanged in Montana, as well as the final execution in the state prior to Furman v. Georgia.

== Early life ==
Little is known about Coleman's personal life, with the only verifiable information coming from an interview with sheriffs after his arrest. According to Coleman, he was born on April 24, 1919, in St. Louis, Missouri, as Phillip J. Coleman Jr., and reportedly had many half-siblings scattered across Illinois and Arkansas. His mother remarried when he was still young, and due to the frequent arguments between her and his stepfather, he fled for Pittsburgh, Pennsylvania at age nine, where he was later picked up by juvenile authorities for stealing bread. Coleman's mother later picked him up and returned him to East St. Louis, but he continued to habitually run away until his mother was supposedly murdered and her body burned to ashes. When pressed for information about her supposed death, Coleman claimed that she had been killed by a white man whom had been visiting her, but was never prosecuted for her death because, at least in Coleman's view, "[she] was a Negro and he was a white man." He also claimed to have finished only a single year of high school.

Sometime during his teenage years or early adulthood, he moved to Franklin, Washington and married a Native American woman from Arlee, Montana, with whom he had two children, but broke off contact with them for unclear reasons. He would later be arrested for burglaries and break-ins in the state, for which he served 14 months in the Monroe Correctional Complex and later six months at the Washington State Penitentiary, respectively. After his release, Coleman would accept various odd jobs as an itinerant laborer, travelling from state to state until he eventually ended up in Montana.

== Lothrop murders ==
On July 24, 1943, Coleman accepted to do some work for 48-year-old Carl W. Pearson, a section foreman for the Northern Pacific Railway who lived in Lothrop. There, he worked alongside 39-year-old Louis Brown, a mixed-race ex-con from Herington, Kansas, who had convictions for vandalism and grand larceny in Kalamazoo, Michigan and Fort Madison, Iowa. After finishing their work for the day, the two men went to a bar in Alberton where they drank beer and played dice together. Upon exiting the premises in the evening, Coleman told Brown that he planned to rob Pearson, as he had seen that he had at least $200 in his house while working there. Much to his dismay, Brown showed no interest, causing Coleman to draw a knife and cut his hand, threatening to kill him if he was uncooperative. Feeling threatened by his younger companion, Brown agreed to accompany him to the Pearson home.

When they returned to the house, Coleman told Pearson that Brown was sick and asked for some aspirin. Once Pearson got some and was returning to them, Coleman drew an axe and bludgeoned him to death using the blunt end of the instrument. The two men then entered the residence and went to the bedroom, where Pearson's wife, 30-year-old Roslyn, was lying in bed. After threatening her to reveal where the money was hidden, Coleman took out a knife and stabbed her to death. After killing the woman, he ordered Brown to grab the bags and meet him at the front door. Instead, Brown hid behind some rocks, as he was afraid that his companion was planning to kill him. After looking and whistling for him for several minutes, Coleman got into the Pearsons' car and left. After making sure that he was gone, Brown got out of his hiding place and headed towards Missoula.

== Manhunt, arrest and investigation ==
The grisly crime scene was discovered by one of the Pearsons' children, 7-year-old Richard, who then ran towards the house of a neighbor, Vera Winsper. After he told Winsper that his father was "lying out in the yard", she went to the house to check on them, only to find that both had been murdered. She then called the police, who immediately issued an arrest warrant for Coleman and Brown, who were last seen at the household. On the following day, the Pearsons' car was found by highway patrolmen in Drummond, but there was no sign of Coleman. Conversely, Brown was arrested at the Western Hotel in Missoula, after he was identified through his social security card. He was lodged for questioning, but steadfastily denied that he had anything to do with the murders.

Over the next three days, police across Montana, as well as in Fargo, North Dakota and Idaho Falls, Idaho, arrested multiple men who they thought might be Coleman, but released all of them when they provided solid alibis. On July 28, the real Coleman was found to be hiding at a freight train car in Drummond, was immediately arrested and brought back to Missoula to face charges. By that time, Brown broke down and admitted responsibility for the crime, explaining in detail how the crime had occurred, but placed the blame for the murders entirely on Coleman. The latter, whose attitude was described as carefree and jovial, readily admitted that he had killed Mrs. Pearson and announced his intention to plead guilty to her murder as fast as possible. However, he claimed that he was not responsible for Mr. Pearson's murder, which was interpreted by authorities as a likely ploy to plead guilty at a later date and possibly receive a lesser sentence. Contemporary media noted that Coleman appeared to be charming and well-spoken, and to even have a rudimentary understanding of court procedure worked based on his actions at preliminary hearings, but was also described as cocky and boastful.

== Trial, sentence and imprisonment ==
The first to be charged with the murders was Coleman, due to his willingness to accept a guilty plea. At the same time, authorities announced that they were investigating the pair for additional crimes, including thefts and possibly an additional murder. While examining one of the bags, determined to be Coleman's, police found numerous advertisements for dice rolling and letters he had written to women from across the country. On July 31, Brown suddenly amended his statement, claiming that he had not seen Coleman murder Mrs. Pearson, but was sure that he had killed both after he had left the house and his clothes had been bloodied. When he was informed that charges would still be brought against him, in addition to being asked why he changed his statement, Brown stated that he was afraid he would be lynched in jail if he had been truthful. While awaiting formal charges, the difference in the two defendants' widely different demeanors were noted in the press: Coleman was described as cheerful and even smiled when his press photo was taken, while Brown was noted for his silence and apparent signs of psychological distress.

On August 2, Coleman pleaded guilty to killing Roslyn Pearson before Justice Albert Besançon. He continued to deny responsibility for Carl Pearson's murder, which he placed entirely on Brown. His counsel filed a charge that aimed to absolve him of this killing, which was criticized by attorney Fremont W. Wilson. During the proceedings, the prosecutors presented witness testimony from several witnesses and a medical examiner, all of which substantiated the supposed robbery motive. In the end, Coleman was found guilty, convicted on all counts and sentenced to death. When asked if he had anything to comment, Coleman exclaimed 'To Hell with it', laughed out loud and sat down, apparently unconcerned with the sentence. Despite these actions, he wrote a letter to Governor Sam C. Ford to ask whether there was a possibility of his sentence being commuted, to which Ford later wrote back and said that he would review the case at a later date.

=== Brown's trial ===
Before Coleman's trial would begin, Justice C. E. Comer granted a motion by the prosecution to name him as a co-defendant in the murder of Carl Pearson. This move was criticized by Coleman's attorneys, Howard Toole and Randolph Jacobs, who claimed that it was harmful to their client's constitutional rights. In the meantime, Coleman, who was reported to play solitaire in his spare time and occasionally tap dance, promised that he would give reporters "the real story" shortly before his scheduled execution date. In that same time interview, he alluded that he could have easily escaped if he had accepted a ride from some white friends in Glendive, and could have fled to Mississippi, where he believed it was too dangerous for authorities to capture black fugitives.

For Brown's trial, fifty jurors from the surrounding area were selected to preside over the trial. In the beginning of the trial, Brown's attorneys filed a motion to amend his not guilty plea, but this was denied by the judge two days later. After a week-long trial, Brown was convicted and sentenced to life imprisonment, whereupon he was taken to the Montana State Prison.

=== Change of plea ===
A little more than a week after his trial ended, Coleman's attorney announced that he would file a motion to withdraw his client's guilty plea, claiming that Coleman would not have pleaded guilty if he had known the death penalty was on the table. This motion was denied by Justice Comer, who ruled that the initial approach was proper and did not valuate any of the convict's rights. A short time later, it was announced that two writers for True Detective had taken interest in the case, and intended to document the entire case. And in response to the recent ruling, Coleman told in an interview with a reporter from Missoulian that he held no hard feelings towards anybody associated with his case, and that he was fully aware and deserving of the sentence he had been handed down.

== Execution, confessions and aftermath ==
In order to carry out Coleman's hanging, special makeshift gallows were erected at the Missoula County Jail, where only a few would be allowed to attend to the hanging itself. In response to a reporter describing him as flippant and unremorseful the day prior to his hanging, Coleman wrote a letter to the Missoulian, saying that this was an untrue characteristic, and that he felt remorse for what he had done, publicly asking for forgiveness from both God and the citizens of Montana. On that same day, Ford's administration announced that they would not grant clemency to Coleman.

Coleman, who had previously refused religious counsel, had been baptized a Catholic in prison, and when brought before the gallows, he again expressed that he was sorry for what he had done and that he was ready to face judgment from God. He was hanged at the Missoula County Jail on September 10, 1943, at exactly 7:07 AM, making this one of the fastest capital punishment cases in the state's history, lasting 47 days from the murder itself to the date of his execution. Coleman's last meal was a plate of fried oysters.

Following his execution, the Missoula Police Department revealed that Coleman had made a written confession claiming that he had killed 23 people over his life time, and that he was responsible for an assault in Walla Walla, Washington for which another man, Jack L. Williams, was currently serving a life sentence. However, he gave details for only eight of these murders:

| Date of murder | Location | Victim | Notes |
|---|---|---|---|
| 1933 | East St. Louis, Illinois | 'Devil' Moore | Bludgeoned with a hammer |
| Unknown | East St. Louis, Illinois | Three unidentified men | Shot over the span of a single week, supposedly while he worked as a triggerman for a gang |
| 1939 | Stockton, California | Mexican named 'Ventez' | Choked to death and buried under a house |
| Unknown | Lackawanna, New York | Unknown | Stenographer's records were not compiled |
| Unknown | Canada | Unidentified black male | Killed by Coleman while he was with a circus |
| May 1943 | Seattle, Washington | A white girl named "Tullie" | Killed by unknown means, body weighed and dropped into the Puget Sound |
| Unknown | Seattle, Washington | Unidentified man | Coleman claimed it involved a "prominent colored man", but refused to disclose details |
| July 3, 1943 | Helena, Montana | Andrew J. Walton, 81 | Black acquaintance of Coleman who was hacked to death with a hatchet. In his confession, Coleman claims that he had staggered into his home during a drunken stupor and intended to rob him, but ultimately stole only 12 cents. He then hitched a ride from Livingston to Butte from a soldier who had supposedly stolen the vehicle, but he never saw the man again. Coleman was considered a suspect in the case beforehand, and since his confession was considered credible, the case was closed. |

Before his execution, Coleman wrote a letter addressed to his son Lee in a dictionary, stating that he was going to be hanged for murder and that he was sorry. This dictionary is currently on exhibit at the Historical Museum at Fort Missoula in Missoula, along with an assortment of other random artifacts reflecting on the city's history.

== See also ==
- List of people executed in Montana (pre-1972)
- List of people executed in the United States in 1943
- List of serial killers in the United States

== Bibliography ==
- Tom Walters (1943). 'Come Help the Sick...and Be Killed'. Official Detective Stories.

| Preceded by Lee Simpson | Executions carried out in Montana | Succeeded by Duncan Peder McKenzie Jr. |
