= Pawel Monat =

Polish military intelligence officer and defector

Paweł Monat
- Born: 24 January 1921
- Military career
- Allegiance: Soviet Union (Red Army, c. 1940–1943); Poland (Polish Army, 1943–1959); United States (from 1959; defected)

Pawel Monat (born 24 January 1921, Stanislawow, Poland) was a Polish military intelligence agent who defected to the United States in 1959.

He had to drop out of medical school at the University of Lvov when his father died.

When Nazi Germany and the Soviet Union invaded and conquered Poland in 1939, Monat found himself in the Soviet-occupied portion. He was drafted into the Red Army and was selected for officer training at the artillery school in Sumy, but was sent to the front in June 1941, the same month the Nazis and their allies launched Operation Barbarossa, the invasion of the Soviet Union. Monat later stated in a 1960 hearing before a congressional subcommittee that he was promoted to lieutenant in March 1942, transferred to the Polish Army in August 1943 and promoted to captain in 1945.

After the end of World War II, he remained in the Polish Army, joining Polish military intelligence in February 1950. He was eventually assigned to the America section. With the death of the Polish military attaché in Pyongyang, North Korea, he was posted, first to Beijing in September 1951, then to North Korea in July 1952, during the Korean War (1950–1953). In 1955, he was posted, under the cover of military attaché, to Washington, DC. With several intelligence successes to his credit, he was recalled to Warsaw and placed in charge of all Polish military attachés worldwide in 1958.

In 1959, Colonel Monat and his family boarded a train, supposedly for a vacation in Yugoslavia, but instead they traveled to Austria, where he walked into the United States embassy in Vienna and defected. Poland sentenced him to death in absentia.

He and co-author John Dill wrote a book, Spy in the U.S.

Monat appeared in an episode of To Tell the Truth which aired on 18 February 1963, a television show in which four regular panelists have to determine through questioning which of three people is the real celebrity.
