= Jewish-American organized crime =

Jewish Mob or the Jewish Mafia

Jewish-American mafia Kosher Mafia
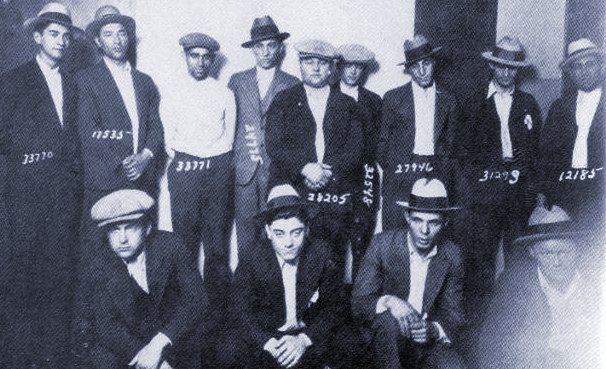
- Some Kosher Mafia members numbered in police reports
- Founded: Late 19th century
- Founded by: Arnold Rothstein, Monk Eastman
- Founding location: New York City, U.S.
- Years active: 19th century–present
- Territory: New York City and its metropolitan area, Philadelphia, Baltimore, Boston, Chicago, Cleveland, Detroit, Las Vegas, Los Angeles, Miami, Milwaukee, Minneapolis, New Jersey, Orlando, Washington D.C., Montreal
- Ethnicity: Jewish
- Criminal activities: Narcotics trafficking; Racketeering; Illegal gambling; Loan sharking; Murder; Extortion; Fraud; Prostitution; Money laundering
- Allies: Italian-American Mafia; Israeli mafia; Russian mafia; Various criminal organizations in the U.S., Australia, and Canada

Jewish-American organized crime initially emerged within the American Jewish community during the late 19th and early 20th centuries. In media and popular culture, it has variously been referred to as the Jewish Mob, the Jewish Mafia, the Kosher Mob, the Kosher Mafia, the Yiddish Connection, and Kosher Nostra or Undzer Shtik (Yiddish: אונדזער שטיק). (Note: Related to Middle High German: unser stück – literally 'our piece,' 'our share', 'our thing'. Also compare to Dutch: ons stuk, Afrikaans: ons stuk, West Frisian: ús stik.) The last two of these terms are direct references to the Italian Cosa Nostra; the former is a play on the word for kosher, referring to Jewish dietary laws, while the latter is a calque of the Italian phrase 'cosa nostra' (Italian for "our thing") into Yiddish, which was at the time the predominant language of the Jewish diaspora in the United States.

In the late 19th century and early 20th century in New York City, Monk Eastman operated the powerful, Jewish-run Eastman Gang that competed with Italian and Irish gangs, notably Paul Kelly's Five Points Gang, for control of New York City's underworld. Another notorious gang, known as the Lenox Avenue Gang, led by Harry "Gyp the Blood" Horowitz, consisted of mostly Jewish members and some Italian members (such as Francesco Cirofisi). It was one of the most violent gangs of the early 20th century and became famous for the murder of gambler and gangster Herman Rosenthal.

In the early 1920s, stimulated by the economic opportunities of the Roaring Twenties, and later stimulated by Prohibition, Jewish organized crime figures such as Arnold Rothstein were controlling a wide range of criminal enterprises, including bootlegging, loansharking, gambling, and bookmaking. According to crime writer Leo Katcher, Rothstein "transformed organized crime from a thuggish activity by hoodlums into a big business, run like a corporation, with himself at the top." Rothstein was allegedly responsible for fixing the 1919 World Series. At the same time, the Jewish bootlegging mob known as The Purple Gang dominated the Detroit underworld during Prohibition, while the Jewish Bugs and Meyer Mob operated on the Lower East Side of Manhattan before being absorbed into Murder, Inc. and becoming affiliates of the Italian-American Mafia.

The largely Jewish-American and Italian-American gang which was known as Murder, Inc. and Jewish mobsters such as Meyer Lansky, Mickey Cohen, Hooky Rothman, Dutch Schultz, and Bugsy Siegel developed close ties with the Italian-American Mafia and gained a significant amount of influence within it; eventually, they formed a loosely organized, mostly Jewish and Italian criminal syndicate which the press named the "National Crime Syndicate." Jewish and Italian crime groups increasingly became interconnected in the 1920s and 1930s, and their connections continued into the 1960s and beyond, partially because both groups often occupied the same neighborhoods and social statuses of the time. The two ethnic crime groups became especially close in New York City following the establishment of the close relationship between partners Lucky Luciano and Meyer Lansky and their subsequent elimination of many of the so-called "Mustache Pete" types — Sicilian-born gangsters who often refused to work with non-Italians and even non-Sicilians. The lines between Jewish and Italian criminal organizations often blurred throughout the 20th century. For decades after, Jewish-American mobsters would continue to work closely and at times compete with Italian-American organized crime.

== Origins and characteristics ==
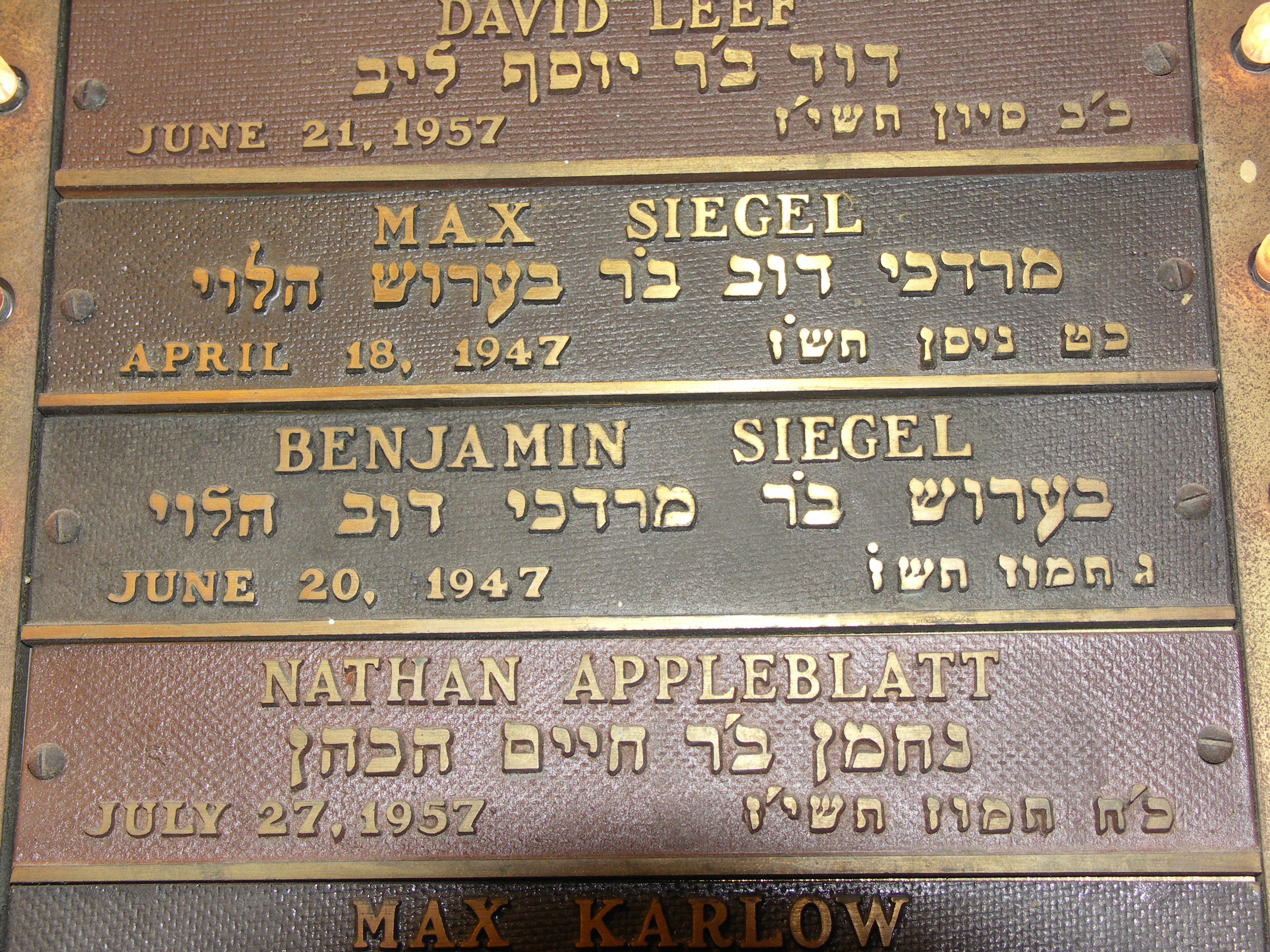
The Siegel family's memorial plaque in the Bialystoker Synagogue.

Jewish-American gangsters were involved in many different criminal activities, including murder, racketeering, bootlegging, prostitution and narcotics. Their role was also significant in New York's burgeoning labor movement, especially the garment and trucking unions, as well as the poultry industry. Jewish organized crime fueled antisemitism and deeply concerned the Jewish community. Jewish organized crime was used by antisemites and anti-immigration supporters as arguments to bolster their agenda. Jewish gangs controlled portions of the Lower East Side and Brownsville in New York City, and were also present in other major American cities. American Jewish mafia boss Kid Cann held sway over Minneapolis for over four decades and remains the most notorious mobster in the history of Minnesota.

Jewish-American organized crime was a reflection of the ethnic succession among gangsters, which has tended to follow the immigrant waves in the United States: English, German, Irish, Jewish, Italian, Asian and Latino. Ethnic involvement in organized crime gave rise to alien conspiracy theories in the US law enforcement community, in which the conception of organized crime as an alien and united entity was vital. The involvement of a small percentage of recent immigrants in organized crime created a lasting stereotype of devious immigrants corrupting the morality of native-born Americans. Organized crime was a complex set of relations between the recently arrived Jewish and Italian criminals and groups like the Irish-American organized crime networks, which had been established before the 1920s and which the newer groups were sometimes subordinate to.

Although never receiving close to the level of cultural attention of the Italian-American Mafia, from the late 1960s, Jewish-American gangsters would figure as characters in Jewish American literature. For some writers, Jewish gangsters and boxers in the post-World War II era were seen as tougher, more aggressive literary role models, freeing the community from the stigma of defenselessness and powerlessness, compared with the physical aggressiveness and lawlessness more associated with the Irish and Italian immigrants. According to Rich Cohen, author of Tough Jews: Fathers, Sons and Gangster Dreams: "If Jewish gangsters still thrived today, if they hadn't gone legit, if Jews of my generation didn't regard them as figments, creatures to be classed with Big Foot and the Loch Ness monster, I think the Jewish community would be better off". However, Cohen's description of Jewish gangsters ignores their criminality and immorality. These tough characters were still gangsters who extorted, exploited and murdered other members of the Jewish-American community for profit. They forced Jewish women into prostitution, and were generally considered a scourge within their own community. The Yiddish press and literature of the 1920s and 1930s were resolute in their condemnation of Jewish mobsters.

== History ==
=== 19th century to early 20th century ===
A large wave of Jewish immigrants from Eastern Europe in the late 19th and early 20th centuries produced Jewish mobsters such as Max "Kid Twist" Zwerbach, "Big" Jack Zelig, and Vach "Cyclone Louie" Lewis, who competed with and were acknowledged by Italian and Irish gangs.

Just as with their Italian counterparts, gangs specializing in extortion began operating in the heavily Jewish neighborhoods of New York's Lower East Side, most prominently the so-called Yiddish Black Hand headed by Jacob Levinsky, Charles "Charlie the Cripple" Litoffsky, and Joseph Toplinsky during the early 20th century. A significant Jewish underworld already existed in New York at the start of the 20th century, with Jewish mobsters conversing in a jargon with Yiddish origins. A pimp was known as a "simcha", a detective as a "shamus", and a loafer as a "trombenik". Jewish-American organized crime arose among "slum kids who as prepubescents stole from pushcarts, who as adolescents extorted money from store owners, who as young adults practiced schlamming" (wielding an iron pipe, wrapped in newspaper, against striking workers or against scabs) – until as adults they joined well-organized gangs involved in a wide variety of criminal enterprises boosted by prohibition.

In Chicago the Maxwell Street area became a center of Jewish organized crime in America, when the area was dominated by Eastern European Jewish immigrants from the 1880s to the 1920s. Like other ethnic groups in the area, the Jews organized themselves into gangs. The Chicago Tribune in 1906 referred to the Maxwell Street area as "the crime center of the country". Other contemporary news reports refer to it as "Bloody Maxwell" and "the Wickedest Police District in the World." Independent Jewish groups ran by gangsters like Jules Portugese, Davy Miller and Benjamin Zuckerman ran the Maxwell Street and greater Lawndale areas. Later Chicago Outfit affiliated Jews like Leonard Patrick and David Yaras took over the area when they killed Zuckerman and unseated his organization.

The lure of quick money, power, and the romance of the criminal lifestyle was attractive to both second-generation Jewish and Italian immigrants. There was a supposed Jewish "crime wave" in early 20th century New York. In disturbing numbers, young Jews had joined crime "rackets", it was said, along with children of Irish, Italian and other immigrants. However, the supposed Jewish-immigrant crime wave may have been exaggerated by the press and law enforcement. Crime and population figures show that Jews in New York committed crimes at a rate far below the average for the wider society. As described by sociologist Stephen Steinberg, less than a sixth of the city's felony arrests were Jews during the 1920s, when Jews constituted nearly a third of the city's population.

As the 20th century progressed, Jewish-American mobsters such as "Dopey" Benny Fein and Joe "The Greaser" Rosenzweig entered labor racketeering, hiring out to both businesses and labor unions as strong-arm men. Labor racketeering or "labor slugging" as it was known, would become a source of conflict as it came under the domination of several racketeers including former Five Points Gang members Nathan "Kid Dropper" Kaplan and Johnny Spanish during the Labor Slugger Wars until its eventual takeover by Jacob "Gurrah" Shapiro in 1927. Other Jewish organized crime figures involved in controlling labor unions include Moses Annenberg and Arnold Rothstein, the latter reportedly responsible for fixing the 1919 World Series.

=== Prohibition ===
According to crime writer Leo Katcher, Rothstein "transformed organized crime from a thuggish activity by hoodlums into a big business, run like a corporation, with himself at the top." According to Rich Cohen, Rothstein was the person to see during prohibition (1920–1933) if one had an idea for a tremendous business opportunity, legal or not. Rothstein "understood the truths of early 20th century capitalism (hypocrisy, exclusion, greed) and came to dominate them". According to Cohen, Rothstein was the 'Moses of Jewish gangsters', a rich man's son, who showed the young and uneducated hoodlums of the Bowery how to have style. Lucky Luciano, who would become a prominent boss within the Italian-American Mafia and helped organize the mafia commission (Salvatore Maranzano organized New York's Five Families), once claimed that Arnold Rothstein "taught me how to dress". The stereotypical attire of the American mobster portrayed in movies can partially trace its roots directly to Rothstein.

During prohibition, Jewish gangsters became major operatives in the American underworld and played prominent roles in the distribution of illegal alcohol and the spread of organized crime throughout the United States. At the time, Jewish gangs operated primarily in America's largest cities, including Cleveland, Detroit, Minneapolis, Newark, New York City, and Philadelphia. Numerous bootlegging gangs such as the Bug and Meyer Mob headed by Meyer Lansky and Bugsy Siegel and Abe Bernstein's Purple Gang would see the rise of Jewish-American organized crime to its height. Other Jewish mobsters, including Dutch Schultz of New York City, Moe Dalitz of Michigan, Kid Cann of Minneapolis, Charles "King" Solomon of Boston and Abner "Longy" Zwillman (the "Al Capone of New Jersey") became wealthy during prohibition.

During this time, Luciano successfully eliminated the Old World Sicilian Mafia bosses like Joe Masseria and Salvatore Maranzano in the 1931 Castellammarese War and took control of the New York Italian Mafia. Luciano did not discriminate against Jews and valued longtime associates such as Meyer Lansky and Benjamin 'Bugsy' Siegel. Several Jewish gangsters such as Red Levine and Bo Weinberg were used in the war as unsuspected non-Italian hitmen. After Masseria and Maranzano were murdered, a conference was held at New York's Franconia Hotel on November 11, 1931, which included Jewish mobsters such as Jacob Shapiro, Louis "Lepke" Buchalter, Joseph "Doc" Stacher, Hyman "Curly" Holtz, Louis "Shadows" Kravitz, Harry Tietlebaum, Philip "Little Farvel" Kovolick and Harry "Big Greenie" Greenberg. During this meeting, Luciano and Lansky convinced the Jewish-American mobsters of the benefits of cooperating with the Italian-American Mafia in a newly created consortium called the National Crime Syndicate by the press. At the meeting's conclusion, "Bugsy" Siegel supposedly declared "The yids and the dagos will no longer fight each other."

Those Jewish gangsters hostile to the idea of cooperation with non-Jewish rivals gradually receded, most notably Philadelphia bootlegger Waxey Gordon, who was convicted and imprisoned for tax evasion based on evidence provided to United States Attorney Thomas E. Dewey by Lansky. Following Gordon's imprisonment, his operations were assumed by Nig Rosen and Max "Boo Hoo" Hoff.

During prohibition Moe Dalitz established the Cleveland Syndicate with fellow Jewish gangsters Louis Rothkopf, Maurice Klein, Sam Tucker, Charles Polizzi, and Irish gangster Blackjack McGinty. Charles Polizzi was born Leo Berkowitz to Jewish biological parents who died when he was an infant. Charles was adopted by the Polizzi family and his adoptive brother, Alfred Polizzi, was the head of the Italian Mayfield Road Mob. The Syndicate was heavily involved with bootlegging on Lake Erie and developed what was known as the Little Jewish Navy. The Syndicate operated casinos in Youngstown, Northern Kentucky, and Florida. The Syndicate attended the Atlantic City Conference representing Cleveland. The Syndicate ran numerous casinos in Newport, Kentucky including the original The Flamingo Hotel & Casino opens (1946), and Tropicana. The Syndicate's reign, in Northern Kentucky, came to an end following a botched attempt to discredit George Ratterman, a candidate for sheriff and a federal crackdown during the Kennedy Administration.

The Cleveland Syndicate members were early investors in the Desert Inn, in Las Vegas, and owned it until it was purchased by Howard Hughes. Its members invested in horse tracks including River Downs, Fair Grounds Race Course, Thistledown Racecourse, Fairmount Park Racetrack, Aurora Downs, and the Agua Caliente Racetrack.

Under Lansky, Jewish mobsters became involved in syndicate gambling interests in Cuba, Miami, and Las Vegas. Buchalter would also lead the predominantly Jewish Murder, Inc. as the Luciano-Meyer syndicate's exclusive hitmen.

=== After World War II ===
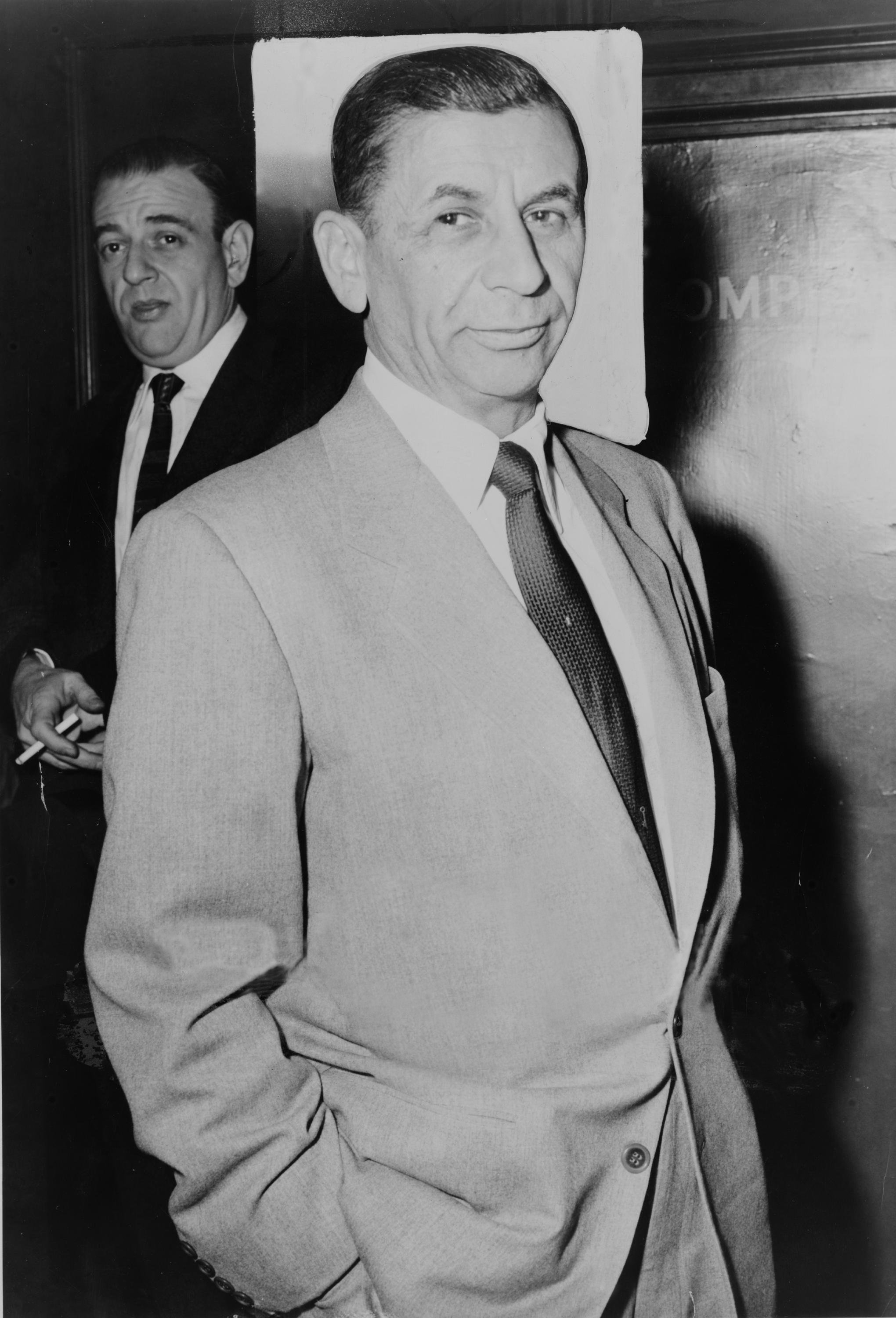
Meyer Lansky in 1958

Following World War II, the dominant figures in organized crime tended to be second-generation Italian-Americans and Jewish-Americans. As late as the 1960s, Jewish presence in organized crime was still acknowledged as being of significance. As Los Angeles mobster Jack Dragna explained to hitman and later government informant Jimmy Fratianno:

Meyer's got a Jewish family built along the same lines as our thing. But his family's all over the country. He's got guys like Lou Rhody and Dalitz, Doc Stacher, Gus Greenbaum, sharp fucking guys, good businessmen, and they know better than try to fuck us.

Jewish mobsters, such as Meyer Lansky and the Los Angeles-based Mickey Cohen, along with Harold "Hooky" Rothman, continued to hold significant power and control organized crime groups in New York City, New Jersey, Chicago, Los Angeles, Miami, and Las Vegas, while the Jewish-American presence remained strong in Italian-American criminal rackets. Shondor Birns was a Jewish crime boss, in Cleveland, who controlled numbers, prostitution, theft, and gambling rackets. Birns was active until 1975 when he was murdered by Irish gangster Danny Greene.

Jewish-American organized crime derived from dislocation and poverty, where language and custom made the community vulnerable to undesirables, the sort of thing that it is claimed fosters criminality among any other ethnicity in a similar situation. As American Jews improved their conditions, the Jewish thug and racketeer either disappeared or merged into a more assimilated American crime environment. American Jews quietly buried the public memory of the gangster past; unlike the Mafia, famous Jewish American gangsters like Meyer Lansky, Dutch Schultz and Bugsy Siegel founded no crime families.

Much like Irish-Americans and other ethnicities (with the exception of Italian-American criminal organizations), Jewish-American presence in organized crime began to decline after World War II. Jewish-American individuals remain closely associated with organized crime, especially Italian-American and Israeli organized crime, but the Jewish-American criminal organizations and gangs which once rivaled the Italian and Irish-American mobsters during the first half of the 20th century have largely faded.

=== Late 20th century to present ===
In more recent years, Jewish-American organized crime has reappeared in the form of Orthodox Jewish, Israeli and Jewish-Russian mafia criminal groups. Many of the Russian mobsters active in New York, especially Brighton Beach, are actually Soviet Jews, including Marat Balagula, Boris Nayfeld, and Evsei Agron.

From the 1990s until 2013, members of the New York divorce coercion gang kidnapped and tortured Orthodox Jewish men in troubled marriages to force them into granting religious divorces to their wives, in some cases extorting money from them. Described by prosecutors as a "criminal syndicate" that was "akin to the Bloods, the Crips, or the Mafia," the organization, which charged up to $100,000 for their 'services,' was shut down in the wake of a sting operation orchestrated by the FBI. While some tried to draw a distinction between the actions of the "well-organized operation" described by prosecutors and traditional kidnapping cases coming before judges that involved murder, terrorism or child abduction, Judge Freda Wolfson said she didn't see any difference. Gang leader Mendel Epstein was sentenced in 2015 to 10 years in prison for the kidnappings, and co-conspirator Martin Wolmark was sentenced to more than 3 years in prison and a $50,000 fine. In another development, a 2016 sting collared Aharon Goldberg and Shimen Liebowitz, two Satmar Hasidic Jews who were part of what The Forward described as the "Orthodox divorce underworld". The pair had colluded with a third man to perform a contract killing on an estranged husband.

== Jewish-American organized crime and Israel ==
Several notable Jewish-American mobsters provided financial support for Israel through donations to Jewish organizations since the country's creation in 1948. Jewish-American gangsters used Israel's Law of Return to flee criminal charges or face deportation. Notables include Joseph "Doc" Stacher, who built up Las Vegas by pairing the Jewish and Italian Mafia into a national organized crime syndicate. Prime Minister Golda Meir set out to reverse this trend in 1970, when she denied entrance to Meyer Lansky.

In 2010, it was reported by Wikileaks that the United States Embassy in Israel, in a cable titled "Israel: The Promised Land of Organized Crime?", had expressed grave concern about the activities of Israeli organized crime figures, and was taking measures to prevent members of crime families from being issued visas to the United States. American diplomats expressed concern that Inbal Gavrieli, the niece of one of Israel's most powerful mafia bosses, had been elected to the Knesset as an MK for Likud.

== Russian and Israeli mafia in the United States ==
The code of silence among Soviet Jewish émigrés into New York City's Brighton Beach and other neighborhoods like it nationwide under the Jackson-Vanik Amendment have shielded new Jewish-American gangsters, such as Marat Balagula, Boris Nayfeld, Monya Elson, and Ludwig Fainberg. They were raised, however, as secular Jews and share more in common culturally with Gentiles from the former Soviet Union than with their predecessors, such as Meyer Lansky, Kid Cann, and Mickey Cohen, who grew up in families that practiced Orthodox Judaism.

Soviet Jewish organized crime figures from other nations, such as Budapest-based Semion Mogilevich, have also attempted to penetrate the United States, including participating in a US$10 billion money-laundering operation through the Bank of New York in 1998.

Organized criminals from the State of Israel have also had a presence in the United States. The Israeli mafia (especially the Tel Aviv-based Abergil crime family) has also been heavily involved in ecstasy trafficking to America.

== Notable members and associates ==
- David Berman, Odessa-born crime boss active in Iowa, New York City, Minneapolis, and Las Vegas
- Abe Bernstein, leader of the Jewish-American Purple Gang in Detroit
- William Morris Bioff, Chicago Outfit pimp and mobbed up labor union boss based in Southern California
- Charles Birger, Prohibition-era crime boss based in Harrisburg, Illinois
- Shondor Birns, Hungarian Jewish immigrant extortionist and loan shark with close ties to the Cleveland crime family and the Five Families
- Isadore "Kid Cann" Blumenfeld, Romanian Jewish immigrant, enforcer, and hitman for the "A.Z. Syndicate", a Minneapolis-based Jewish crime family also operating in South Florida, the Las Vegas Strip, Chicago, and Louisiana
- Lepke Buchalter, head of the Mafia hit squad Murder, Inc.
- Meyer "Mickey" Cohen, crime boss in Los Angeles
- Moe Dalitz and Louis Rothkopf, heads of the Cleveland Syndicate
- John Factor, Polish Jewish fugitive from British justice, mastermind of the framing of Irish mob boss Roger Touhy for a phony kidnapping, and senior associate of the Chicago Outfit, who ran several casinos on the Las Vegas Strip
- Leon Gleckman, Belarusian Jewish immigrant, Twin Cities-based bootlegger, and political fixer, termed during the Prohibition era "The Al Capone of St. Paul"
- Jake Guzik, immigrant from Austria-Hungary to Chicago, prostitution ring boss in The Levee, and political fixer linked to the Chicago Outfit
- Mike Heitler, Ukrainian Jewish immigrant and prostitution ring boss tied to the Chicago Outfit
- Phillip Kastel, leader of a massive illegal gambling operation in Louisiana with links to the Genovese crime family and the New Orleans crime family
- Meyer Lansky, Belarusian Jewish immigrant and mob boss with ties to the Genovese crime family
- William Obront, mafia leader in Montreal and then in the US
- Abe Reles, most feared hit man of Murder, Inc.
- Arnold Rothstein, New York's crime boss
- Dutch Schultz, German-American Jewish crime boss operating in the Bronx and Harlem
- Benjamin "Bugsy" Siegel, Lansky associate, casino owner, and Las Vegas' crime boss
- Abner Zwillman, New Jersey crime boss

== See also ==
- Abergil crime family
- List of Jewish American mobsters
- Luck (TV series)
- Magic City (TV series)
- Once Upon a Time in America
- Zwi Migdal

== Sources ==
- Block, Alan A. (1976). Lepke, Kid Twist, and the Combination: Organized Crime in New York City, 1930–1944.
- Cohen, Rich (1999). Tough Jews: Fathers, Sons, and Gangster Dreams, London: Vintage ISBN 0-09-975791-5 (Review in The New York Times)
- Eisenberg, Dennis, Dan Uri & Eli Landau (1979). Meyer Lansky: Mogul of the Mob, New York: Paddington Press.
- Fried, Albert (1980). The Rise and Fall of the Jewish Gangster in America, New York: Holt, Rinehart and Winston ISBN 0-231-09683-6
- Henderson Clarke, Donald (1929). In the Reign of Rothstein, New York: The Vanguard Press.
- Kraus, Joe. 2019. The Kosher Capones: A History of Chicago's Jewish Gangsters. Northern Illinois University Press
- Rockaway, Robert A. (1993). But He Was Good to His Mother: The Lives and Crimes of Jewish Gangsters. Jerusalem: Gefen Publishing House.
- Pietrusza, David (2023) Gangsterland: A Tour Through the Dark Heart of Jazz-Age New York City New York: Diversion Books.
- Pietrusza, David (2003) Rothstein: The Life, Times and Murder of the Criminal Genius Who Fixed the 1919 World Series New York: Carol & Graf.
- Ross, Ron (2003). Bummy Davis vs. Murder, Inc.: The Rise and Fall of the Jewish Mafia and an Ill-Fated Prizefighter, New York: St. Martin's Press ISBN 0-312-30638-5 (Review in Forward)
- Rubin, Rachel (2000). Jewish Gangsters of Modern Literature, Chicago: University of Illinois Press
- Rubin, Rachel (2002). "Gangster Generation: Crime, Jews and the Problem of Assimilation", Shofar: An Interdisciplinary Journal of Jewish Studies – Volume 20, Number 4, Summer 2002, pp. 1–17
- Russo, Gus (2006). Supermob: How Sidney Korshak and His Criminal Associates Became America's Hidden Power Brokers, New York: Bloomsbury (Review in The New York Times; Review in Forward)
- Sadowsky, Sandy (1992). Wedded to Crime: My Life in the Jewish Mafia.
- Sifakis, Carl (2005). The Mafia Encyclopedia (Third Edition), New York: Facts on File, ISBN 0-8160-5694-3
- Tosches, Nick (2005). King of the Jews. The Arnold Rothstein Story, London: Hamish Hamilton ISBN 0-241-14144-3
- Weissman Joseph, Jenna (1983). Our Gang: Jewish Crime and the New York Jewish Community, 1900–1940, Bloomington: Indiana University Press. (Review in The New York Times)
