= Lou Kravitz =

American criminal

Louis Kravitz (also known as Lou Kay or Shadows) was a New York labor racketeer and drug trafficker during the 1930s. He was associated throughout his career with Louis "Lepke" Buchalter.

== Early career ==
On July 12, 1929, Kravitz, along with Louis Buchalter, Jacob Shapiro and two other gangsters, broke into the M. L. Rosenblatt clothing plant and wrecked $25,000 worth of machinery and goods. The New York Times described them as "members of a gang which has been terrorizing nonunion clothing manufacturers".

Kravitz was among the first nine people to be arrested, along with Louis Buchalter, Jacob Shapiro, Bugsy Siegel, Joseph Stacher, Harry Teitelbaum, Harry Greenberg, Hyman "Curly" Holtz, and Philip "Joseph Farvel" Kovolick, under a New York state law which made "it a crime for men of evil repute to gather together" for unlawful purposes. The arrest was seen as providing a test case for the law.

The nine were arrested in a suite in the Hotel Franconia, where, police charged, they were plotting to terrorize the clothing industry; in fact they were there for a conference organized by Meyer Lansky and Charles "Lucky" Luciano for the purpose of establishing an enduring alliance between Jewish and Italian gangsters. None of this was known, however, by the authorities; nor did they have any evidence of what the nine said to each other or planned to do.

As a result the charges against Kravitz and the other eight defendants were dismissed before trial on the motion of their attorney Samuel Leibowitz. As the Magistrate stated in issuing his ruling:

There was not the slightest evidence presented by the State in this case to show these defendants had met unlawfully. I have no doubt that all but one of the defendants are men of evil character and a liability on the community. If it were not for the fact the "unlawful purpose" element in the charge against them had not been proved, I would not hesitate to sentence them to the full penalty.

== Drug trafficking ==
Kravitz, according to some press accounts, acted as "a sort of business manager" for Buchalter when Buchalter sought to muscle in on a drug smuggling network. Kravitz was, according to another participant in the ring, in charge of the percentages for distribution of profits and the prices to be charged.

Kravitz disappeared from public view in 1937 after the arrest of Buchalter and 28 other defendants charged with importing narcotics. By 1939, federal authorities were offering a $1000 reward for Kravitz's capture. He was finally apprehended in October 1941 and upon his plea of guilty was given a prison sentence of one year and one day.

== See also ==
- Inchoate offense
- Organized crime
