= Joseph Stacher =

American syndicate leader (1902–1977)

- Born: Gdale Oistaczer (גדאַלע אויסטאַטשער) c. 1902; Letychiv, Ukraine
- Died: February 28, 1977; Munich, West Germany
- Other names: Doc Stacher, Doc Harris, Joe or Joseph Rosen, J. P. Harris, Doc Harris, George Kent, Harry Goldman
- Occupations: Gangster, gambler, businessman

Joseph Stacher (c. 1902 – 1977) (alias "Doc Stacher," "Doc Harris," "Joe Rosen", "J. P. Harris," "George Kent," and "Harry Goldman") was a Jewish syndicate leader who helped bring together Jewish and Italian-American organized crime groups into a national organized crime syndicate in the early 1930s. Stacher was later a leading force in organized crime's gambling activities in Las Vegas and pre-Castro Havana.

== Early life ==
Joseph Stacher was born Gdale Oistaczer (גדאַלע אויסטאַטשער) (commonly pronounced Gedalia) in Letychiv, Ukraine around 1902. He Americanized his name after emigrating with his family to the United States in 1912.

As a teenager living in Newark, New Jersey Stacher became friends with Abner "Longie" Zwillman. He later joined Zwillman's gang, which went by the name "The Happy Ramblers" and which offered protection to Jewish storeowners and street vendors in Newark's Third Ward who faced harassment by Irish thugs from the neighboring Eighteenth Ward.

== Prohibition-era career ==
Zwillman and Stacher became involved in bootlegging with the advent of Prohibition in 1920. Starting off by providing protection for liquor shipments as they traveled from shoreline drop-off points to their ultimate destination in New Jersey or New York, Zwillman and Stacher ultimately became partners with Joseph Reinfeld as part of the Reinfeld syndicate, which imported nearly 40 percent of all the illicit alcohol consumed in the United States during Prohibition and took in an estimated $60,000,000 during the years from 1926 to 1933. They remained Reinfeld's silent partners in Browne-Vintners, a liquor importing and distribution company, after the end of Prohibition.

Stacher served as Zwillman's lieutenant in other areas and, by the end of the 1920s, was running much of Zwillman's gambling operations. Stacher also provided muscle for Zwillman, as shown by his repeated arrests for assault and battery in 1926 and 1927.

== The Franconia Hotel conference ==
Stacher's bootlegging and gambling activities brought him into contact with Meyer Lansky, with whom he would work for the rest of his career in organized crime. Lansky and Stacher played a pivotal role, along with Charles "Lucky" Luciano, in forming an enduring alliance between Jewish and Italian gangsters.

The 1920s were marked by violent conflicts between members of different organized crime groups for control of territory and rackets in American cities. Those feuds became particularly severe in New York in the late 1920s, culminating in the Castellammarese War that broke out in early 1930 between rival factions of the Italian-American Mafia. At its conclusion in 1931 most of the old leaders had been murdered or sidelined and a new structure, which created a commission to resolve disputes between the Five Families in New York and its environs, as well as other organized crime organizations nationwide and in Canada, had been put in place.

Jewish mobsters such as Lansky and Benjamin "Bugsy" Siegel had established strong alliances with the "Young Turks," such as Lucky Luciano, who emerged as the victors in the Castellammarese War. They had also played a key role at critical moments in that conflict, providing gunmen who were part of the teams that assassinated both Joe Masseria and Salvatore Maranzano.

Shortly after the end of that war Stacher helped Lansky organize a conference of Jewish-American organized crime leaders at the Franconia Hotel in New York City on November 11, 1931. In addition to Lansky and Stacher, invitees included Jacob "Gurrah" Shapiro, Louis "Lepke" Buchalter, Hyman "Curly" Holtz, Louis "Shadows" Kravitz, Harry Teitelbaum, Philip "Joseph Farvel" Kovolick, Harry "Big Greenie" Greenberg, and Bugsy Siegel.

During this meeting, Luciano and Lansky convinced the Jewish-American mobsters of the benefits of cooperating with the Italian-American Mafia in a newly created consortium, called the National Crime Syndicate by the press. At the meeting's conclusion, Bugsy Siegel supposedly declared "The yids and the dagos will no longer fight each other."

Before the conference was over, however, the police raided the hotel and arrested Stacher, Shapiro, Buchalter, Holtz, Kravitz, Teitelbaum, Kovolick, Greenberg and Siegel. The nine defendants were charged with "consorting" with other known criminals, namely each other, in violation of a law recently enacted at the insistence of the Amalgamated Clothing Workers of America.

The charges against Stacher and the other eight defendants were dismissed before trial, however, on the motion of their attorney Samuel Leibowitz. The statute not only required the State to prove that the defendants were of bad moral character, and that they had associated with one another, but also that they were meeting for an unlawful purpose. The State had not offered any evidence to show what the purpose of the Franconia Hotel meeting was, much less that it was unlawful. As the Magistrate stated in issuing his ruling:

There was not the slightest evidence presented by the State in this case to show these defendants had met unlawfully. I have no doubt that all but one of the defendants are men of evil character and a liability on the community. If it were not for the fact the "unlawful purpose" element in the charge against them had not been proved, I would not hesitate to sentence them to the full penalty.

== Post-Prohibition career ==
With the end of Prohibition in 1933 Lansky and Stacher turned their efforts toward increasing organized crime's stake in gambling enterprises. Stacher was involved to an extent in the mob's expanded nationwide bookmaking operations led by Frank Erickson and in local slot machine and pinball rackets, as owner of Runyon Sales Company, a company that produced the machines themselves, then later distributed the products of other companies, such as Bally Manufacturing Company.

Stacher also continued his role as liaison between Jewish gangsters and Italian-American crime families. Stacher attended, and may have helped organize, the Havana Conference, a 1946 meeting that brought together the major figures in both Jewish and Italian organized crime to discuss internal disputes and future criminal endeavors.

Stacher is best known, however, for his work, often as Lansky's lieutenant, overseeing organized crime's involvement in casino gambling, both in the United States and abroad. Stacher continued running gambling operations until 1964, when Federal authorities arrested him for tax evasion.

=== Saratoga Springs ===
Saratoga Springs had been known for its legal and illegal gambling for decades before 1917, when Arnold Rothstein opened the Arrowhead Inn, a "lake house" serving as a gambling establishment, after bribing local officials to make it possible. He opened a second casino and hotel, The Brook Resort, the following year. Luciano and Lansky worked for Rothstein at The Brook during the 1920s.

Lansky subsequently took over the Arrowhead Inn and opened a second Saratoga casino, the Piping Rock Club. Stacher ran the Arrowhead Inn for Lansky and, according to the federal indictment against him for illegal gambling and conspiracy in connection with the Arrowhead Inn, was one of its owners before it shut down in 1947. In 1953, after successfully fighting extradition from Nevada for a year, he returned to New York State to plead guilty to those charges. He was fined $10,000 and given a one-year suspended sentence.

=== Nevada ===
In July, 1950 Stacher purchased an interest in the Bank Club, one of Reno’s oldest and best known gambling casinos. Stacher then applied for a gambling license from the state and the city, boasting that if he ran into trouble getting them, he simply would pay what he needed to, up to $250,000, to make it happen. The Nevada Tax Commission, however, denied him the requisite license, forcing him to sell his shares in 1952.

Stacher then shifted his base of operations to Las Vegas, operating out of hotel rooms while his wife made her home in Southern California. Stacher represented Lansky's interests, overseeing the payoffs to local officials and managing the "skim" from casinos under his control, such as the Sands, where both he and Lansky had provided initial capital and had ownership interests, and the Fremont.

=== Cuba ===
In 1946 he attended the Havana Conference in Cuba. Lansky and his organized crime allies had tried to establish gambling operations in Cuba since the early 1930s but were not able to do so until the 1950s, when Fulgencio Batista returned to power after a military coup. One of Batista’s first steps was to appoint Lansky as his adviser on gambling reform--ironically to clean up the industry, which had acquired a reputation as dishonest. Lansky saw that Cuba would attract more gamblers from the United States, and therefore create even greater profits, if it ran its casinos on the up and up. Lansky therefore fired many of the dealers and brought in new ones from his operations in South Florida, upstate New York and Las Vegas while enforcing rigid gaming regulations.

Organized crime figures soon controlled the gambling at the Hotel Nacional, the Hotel Plaza, and the Hotel Sevilla. Lansky and his underworld partners also proceeded, typically with both their own capital and public funds, to build new, luxurious casinos: the Riviera, the Capri, and the Deauville.

These operations were made possible by monthly payments of $1,280,000 to Batista, which Stacher ensured were delivered. Lansky and his partners lost all of this with the nationalization of the casinos following the victory of the Cuban Revolution in 1959.

== Deportation, prosecution and departure ==
=== Deportation proceedings ===
Stacher obtained United States citizenship in May 1930. The government sought to revoke his naturalization in 1952 based on his concealment of material facts and material misrepresentations with respect to his moral character, his membership in Longie Zwillman's "Third Ward Gang," his use of other names and his previous arrests on his 1930 application for naturalization. The District Court granted the government's petition and revoked his citizenship in 1956; the Court of Appeals upheld that decision in 1958. This was one of the earliest applications of the McCarran-Walter Act's denaturalization provisions against a high-profile organized crime figure.

That set the stage for deportation proceedings. The Justice Department did not take any action, however, to obtain an order of deportation until 1961, when it held him for "deferred inspection" when he returned from a vacation abroad; it then released him on parole pending an exclusionary hearing before a Special Inquiry Officer. The Special Inquiry Officer ruled that he was properly "excludable," based on his 1953 conviction; the District Court affirmed that ruling.

But even that ruling did not lead to his deportation because the statute provided that an "excludable" alien, i.e., someone excluded when they sought to enter the United States (as opposed to a "removable" alien, who is deported while present in the United States) must be "deported to the country whence he came," meaning "a country in which the alien had resided long enough to have a place of abode." But Stacher, who had been admitted as a permanent resident in 1912 and had been living in the United States since then, had no other place of abode, meaning that he could not be deported anywhere. That left Stacher in a sort of immigration limbo: no longer a citizen, not eligible to be present in the United States, but presumably not subject to an order of deportation unless the government started over and treated him as a removable, rather than excludable alien.

=== Prosecution and departure ===
Stacher might have remained in that anomalous position if the government had not initiated criminal proceedings against him for tax evasion. In 1964, Stacher pleaded guilty to concealing gambling income from the 1940s and 1950s and was sentenced to five years imprisonment. Rather than serve time, Stacher agreed to pay a fine and voluntarily depart the U.S., invoking Israel's Law of Return to gain entry as a Jewish immigrant in 1965 and avoid formal expulsion.

Invoking that right to return was not automatic: Israel could deny citizenship to those it deemed a threat, as it later did in the case of Meyer Lansky. In order to improve his chances of acceptance Stacher enlisted the assistance of long-time friend Frank Sinatra, and of a prominent rabbi, Menahem Porush, then a deputy mayor of Jerusalem and Knesset member, by making a charitable contribution of $100,000. Rabbi Porush later claimed he did not know about Stacher's criminal background when he accepted the contribution--which ended up being invested in a hotel in Jerusalem instead. Stacher successfully sued to recover the money.

While living in Israel he served as the primary source of Israeli journalists Dennis Eisenberg, Uri Dan, and Eli Landau for a biography of Meyer Lansky. Stacher continued living in Israel until his death.

== Death ==
Stacher died, according to some reports, in a Munich hotel room on February 28, 1977. His death was reported as a heart attack and his body shipped back to Israel.

He was buried secretly and the nameplate of his grave was altered to hide his burial site. Only eight men were at the funeral, so the family had to ask a reporter and photographer to join the ceremony in order to attain a minyan.
