= Lansky (1999 film) =

1999 American television film

- DVD cover
- Genre: Crime drama
- Based on: Meyer Lansky: Mogul of the Mob by: Uri Dan; Dennis Eisenberg; Eli Landau
- Written by: David Mamet
- Directed by: John McNaughton
- Starring: Richard Dreyfuss; Eric Roberts; Illeana Douglas; Ryan Merriman; Beverly D'Angelo; Anthony LaPaglia
- Music by: George S. Clinton
- Country of origin: United States
- Original language: English

Production
- Executive producers: Frederick Zollo; Nicholas Paleologos; David Mamet
- Producer: Fred C. Caruso
- Cinematography: John A. Alonzo
- Editor: Elena Maganini
- Running time: 114 minutes
- Production companies: HBO Pictures; Frederick Zollo Productions

Original release
- Network: HBO
- Release: February 27, 1999

Lansky is a 1999 American crime drama television film directed by John McNaughton and written by David Mamet, based in part on the 1979 biography Meyer Lansky: Mogul of the Mob by Uri Dan, Dennis Eisenberg, and Eli Landau. It stars Richard Dreyfuss as the famous gangster Meyer Lansky, Eric Roberts as Bugsy Siegel, and Ryan Merriman as the young Lansky. Illeana Douglas, Beverly D'Angelo, and Anthony LaPaglia also star. The film aired on HBO on February 27, 1999.

== Plot ==
The movie starts with flashbacks of Lansky's life, first showing an elderly Lansky looking for a rock to put on his grandfather's grave in Jerusalem. Upon seeing soldiers of the Israeli Defense Force, Lansky expresses regret that his grandfather never lived to see them. As he walks through a tunnel, he catches sight of an old man. He recalls how at the age of ten, he witnessed an elderly Jew being hacked to death with an axe during a pogrom. Another flashback shows Lansky and his family fleeing as their shtetl is burned to the ground, his parents hastily packing up their valuables and preparing to emigrate to the United States. Lansky's grandfather watches skeptically and refuses to leave, believing it to be an act of cowardice not to fight back. His son, Lansky's father, replies with "You think I should fight? You stay, and you fight."

The setting then moves forward several years later to the Lower East Side of New York. After his mother gives him money to go buy challah for Shabbat, Lansky comes upon a game of craps on the street corner. He returns home, penniless and ashamed, to face a brutal reprimand from his parents for betraying their trust.

Later, Lansky and his friend Benjamin Siegel are shown eyeing the Irish-American boy who operates the craps game. Lansky makes a bet, but then sees the operator's friend sliding him another set of dice as he throws his. Certain that the game is rigged, Lansky shouts that he has won the bet. The operator shoves him, Lansky shoves him back, and then the operator's friend pulls out a knife and cuts his arm. Siegel suddenly arrives and hits the knife-wielding kid with a brick, shouting at him to hand over the money. As Lansky and Siegel are walking down to the docks, they see the Irish kid who bet against them; the kid sees them and starts yelling antisemitic Irish slurs. Lansky tackles him into the water and slits the Irish kid's neck.

As blood is sliding around in the water, the film returns to the elderly Lansky, drinking wine with the Jewish man he saw earlier. The Jewish man goes to pray in the synagogue as the film cuts to a younger Lansky now running his own craps games. Lansky goes into an alley to count his money, where he meets teenage hoodlum Charles "Lucky" Luciano. When Luciano tells him that he needs to pay protection for running games in his neighborhood, Lansky refuses and receives a severe beating from Luciano's gang. Nevertheless, he refuses to pay up.

Luciano takes a liking to Lansky's guts and recruits him and Siegel into his gang. By the early 1920s, Luciano and his boys have become involved with the bootlegging of illegal alcohol. Siegel, Luciano, and Lansky are shown driving one of their trucks loaded with alcohol when they are suddenly ambushed by associates of wealthy Jewish gangster Arnold Rothstein. Luciano and Lansky cut a deal to hand over a truckload of their liquor to Rothstein to avoid being killed, but by the time they've made their escape, Rothstein's men realize the "shipment" is nothing more than a bunch of empty suitcases. Impressed, Rothstein invites the gang to his house for a sit-down. He offers Siegel and Lansky jobs in his organization, recognizing their talent.

After Rothstein is murdered in 1928, Lansky and Siegel work with Luciano, now a powerful gangster in his own right, to take over New York's criminal underworld by assassinating Mafia bosses Joe Masseria and Salvatore Maranzano. Luciano takes control of Masseria and Maranzano's gangs and establishes the Commission, declaring that the Five Families can now work freely with the Jewish and Irish mobs. Lansky builds up his prestige by opening and running several highly profitable casinos in Cuba and helping Siegel get a start in Las Vegas. After Siegel overspends on his own casinos and his girlfriend Virginia Hill is suspected of stealing money, Meyer uses his influence to buy his childhood friend time to turn the venture around.

A month after warning Siegel that the Flamingo is not earning enough of a profit, Lansky can no longer prevent the Commission from taking out Siegel, and reluctantly approves a hit on his friend. Years later, Lansky, now facing federal charges of tax evasion, flees to Israel and tries to settle there by exploiting his Jewish heritage, only to be arrested after two years and extradited back to the United States. He manages to avoid prison and retires to Miami, his personal fortune all but gone now that his Cuban casinos have been dismantled by Fidel Castro's regime. At the climax of the film, Lansky gives an interview to a French journalist. When the journalist asks him what he would do if he could live his life over, Lansky responds, "I wouldn't change a thing."

== Cast ==
- Richard Dreyfuss as Meyer Lansky
- Yosef Carmon as Rabbi
- Mosko Alkalai as Jewelry Shopkeeper
- Fima Noveck as Hasid in Grodno
- Joshua Praw as Meyer Lansky at age 8
- Bernard Hiller as Max Lansky
- Jill Holden as Yetta Lansky
- Larry Moss as Benjamin Lansky
- Chris Marquette as Jake Lansky (age 9-11)
- Ryan Merriman as Meyer Lansky (age 12-14)
- Benjamin Kimball Smith as Benjamin K. Smith
- Anthony Medwetz as Benny "Bugsy" Siegel (age 11)
- Max Perlich as Meyer Lansky (age 19-28)
- Matthew Settle as Benny "Bugsy" Siegel (age 17-26)
- Stanley DeSantis as Arnold Rothstein
- Scott Rabinowitz as Zev Ben-Dov
- Illeana Douglas as Anna Lansky
- Bill Capizzi as Joe Masseria
- Ron Gilbert as Salvatore Maranzano
- Nick Corello as Albert Anastasia
- Tom La Grua as Frank Costello
- Sal Landi as Joe Adonis
- Anthony LaPaglia as Charlie "Lucky" Luciano
- Robert Miano as Vito Genovese
- Eric Roberts as Benny "Bugsy" Siegel
- Peggy Jo Jacobs as Virginia Hill
- Beverly D'Angelo as Teddy Lansky
