= Harry Greenberg =

American mobster (1909–1939)

Harry "Big Greenie" Greenberg (1909 – November 22, 1939) was an American gangster, known for being an associate and childhood friend of Benjamin "Bugsy" Siegel, and an employee of both Charlie "Lucky" Luciano and Meyer Lansky.

== Life ==
Greenberg was born in Brooklyn, New York in 1909; to Jewish parents. On the streets of New York is where he met Siegel and 1930s Murder, Inc. leader Louis Buchalter.

His first known arrest was in September 1927 for the drowning of Benjamin Goldstein; he was arrested with two other low-level criminals named Joseph Lefkowitz and Irving Rubinzahl. Greenberg was acquitted, and only Lefkowitz was convicted for the crime and sentenced to the electric chair, although he was later acquitted. On November 11, 1928, police raided a home and arrested Greenberg and Siegel, Harry Teitelbaum, Louis Kravitz, Philip Kovolick, Hyman Holtz, Joseph Stacher, and Jacob Shapiro. Most of these men were the assassins and backbone of Murder Inc. The men had met together to discuss their rival Waxey Gordon. In 1934, dynamite was dropped through the chimney of an office owned by Siegel on Grand Street, Manhattan as retribution for Siegel murdering rival bootleggers; however, it had exploded too early before Siegel walked into the room, although he and others were wounded. Three days later, Louis and Andy Fabrizzo, who were members of Gordon's crew, were murdered and found near a distillery owned by Gordon. Greenberg, Shapiro, Stacher, and Siegel were involved but it is alleged that only Siegel pulled the trigger. In 1936, he was ordered by Louis "Lepke" Buchalter to lead a raid into the office of Needle Trades Workers Industrial Union, who were having a meeting at the time.

=== Murder ===
On November 22, 1939, Greenberg was murdered by Bugsy Siegel, Whitey Krakow, and Lucchese crime family soldier Frankie Carbo. Prosecutors claimed that Siegel had brought them to his house and drove the getaway car, and that Carbo shot Greenberg in the head five times. His wife Ida Greenberg found him murdered at his driveway. Greenberg had allegedly demanded $5,000 (equivalent to $115,730 in 2025) from Buchalter to keep his silence from law enforcement; however, Buchalter subsequently ordered his murder. Siegel was sent to trial in 1940 but not convicted. The second trial began in 1942 and Carbo was the main defendant; Krakow was murdered in 1941. Abe Reles, a notorious hitman for Murder Inc., agreed to testify but the case was dismissed when he died in 1941; his cause of death is highly debated. Another Murder Inc. hitman who also became an informant, Albert Tannenbaum, said he brought the murder weapons to Los Angeles from New York and gave them to Carbo and Siegel.

== In popular culture ==
Greenberg was portrayed by Elliott Gould in the 1991 film Bugsy.
