= Yiddish Black Hand =

Criminal organization

- Years active: c.1900-c.1915
- Territory: New York City
- Ethnicity: Jews
- Activities: contract killings, extortion

The Yiddish Black Hand or the Jewish Black Hand Association was a criminal organization and extortion ring that operated on New York's Lower East Side during the early 20th century, led by Jacob "Johnny" Levinsky. Around 1906, Levinsky, with Charles "Charley the Cripple" Vitoffsky, and Joseph Toblinsky, began an extortion ring from their hangout at a Suffolk Street saloon, delivering anonymous letters signed as the "Yiddish Black Hand" threatening to steal or poison the horses of local pushcart vendors and other businessmen, usually fellow Jewish immigrants.

This method had been used in New York City by Neapolitan Camorristi, Sicilian mafiosi, and other Italian immigrant criminal gangs who preyed on fellow Italian immigrants as the Black Hand. Within three years, the ice cream manufacturers' association created a commercial fund from which they would annually pay off the organization.

By the end of 1913, having gained a virtual monopoly in their criminal activities, the three reorganized their criminal organization with Levinsky concentrating on extortion in the ice cream trade, Vitoffsky focusing on job offers between rival dealers and manufacturers of seltzer and soda while Toplinsky cornered the produce market, truckmen and livery stables.

Although the three often worked independently from each other, they did work together when hired out for specific jobs such as assault, theft, and murder for hire. A member who had turned informant provided a description of their rates:

- Shooting, fatal - $500
- Shooting, not fatal - $100
- Poisoning a team - $50
- Poisoning one horse - $35
- Stealing a horse and a rig - $25

== See also ==
- Jewish-American organized crime
- Black Hand
