= Joseph Reinfeld =

Joseph Hersch Reinfeld (1891–1958) (last name later changed to Renfield) was a major bootlegger during the Prohibition era in the United States. After prohibition ended, he owned several large liquor import and distribution companies.

== Biography ==
Reinfeld was born in Lubaczów, Poland (Then the Austrian Partition) and emigrated to the United States in 1910, settling in Newark, New Jersey, where he opened a tavern. When Prohibition arrived in 1920, he had difficulty in getting good quality liquor for his business. Reinfeld formed a syndicate with Newark mobsters Abner Zwillman and Joseph Stacher, and henchman James Rutkin. The syndicate imported liquor from Canada, partnering with Samuel Bronfman's Joseph E. Seagram & Sons distiller. The liquor was transported from Canada to the islands of Saint Pierre and Miquelon, a French territory near Newfoundland, Canada, and then shipped to Port Newark, Atlantic Highlands and other areas in New Jersey. The syndicate bribed local politicians and police to ensure the liquor was transported and stored without interference. Testimony during the Kefauver Committee hearings estimated that Reinfeld's syndicate imported nearly 40% of all the alcohol consumed in the U.S. during Prohibition. Reinfeld was charged in 1925 for the murder of Louis LaFera, a former government prohibition agent, but the government failed to get an indictment from the grand jury and the charges were dropped.

After Prohibition ended in 1933, Reinfeld founded Browne-Vintners, a liquor import and distribution company, as a legal continuation of his old syndicate. Browne-Vintners became the importer and distributor of White Horse Scotch Whisky, one of the Big Five Scotches. The company was sold to Seagrams in 1940 for $7.5 million. However, Reinfeld ran into problems when he allegedly short-changed the other members of his syndicate. One of the members, James Rutkin, threatened to kill Reinfeld if he did not receive additional funds. Reinfeld then gave Rutkin $250,000. However, Rutkin did not declare the money as income on his tax return and was convicted in 1950 of income tax evasion. An appeal of the case went all the way to the United States Supreme Court in 1952, with the court finding against Rutkin. Rutkin also filed a $22 million civil suit in 1948 against Reinfeld and Samuel Bronfman, alleging that he was defrauded out of his share of a distillery in Canada. However, the suit was ultimately decided against him. Rutkin died of a slashed throat in a Jersey City, NJ jail cell in 1956, which was ruled a suicide.

Reinfeld started Reinfeld Importers (later Renfield Importers), a liquor import and distribution company, which bought Somerset Importers from Joseph P. Kennedy Sr. in 1946. The company distributed various brands, including Haig & Haig and King William IV scotch whiskeys, Gordon's gin and vodka, Rémy Martin cognac, Piper-Heidsieck champagne, and Martini & Rossi vermouth. In 1986, Renfield Importers was sold to Schenley Industries, which was itself sold to Guinness the following year.

The Reinfeld name is carried on today as a sub-division of New Jersey's largest wine & spirits distributor, Allied Beverage Group. Allied Beverage Group is the result of four mergers amongst NJ family-owned wholesalers, starting with the Baxter Group- the legacy company of Joseph Reinfeld and his brothers' original distribution company. The company is now on its 4th generation of family members.

Reinfeld also was a part owner of the Tanforan Racetrack in California.

Sources have reported that Reinfeld was later knighted by the British government, as Sir Joseph Renfield, but this was not accurate.
