= Bugsy =

1991 biographical film by Barry Levinson

- Theatrical release poster
- Directed by: Barry Levinson
- Written by: James Toback
- Produced by: Mark Johnson; Barry Levinson; Warren Beatty
- Starring: Warren Beatty; Annette Bening; Harvey Keitel; Ben Kingsley; Joe Mantegna
- Cinematography: Allen Daviau
- Edited by: Stu Linder
- Music by: Ennio Morricone
- Production companies: Mulholland Productions; Baltimore Pictures
- Distributed by: TriStar Pictures
- Release dates: December 10, 1991 (Museum of Modern Art); December 13, 1991 (United States)
- Running time: 137 minutes
- Country: United States
- Language: English
- Budget: $30 million
- Box office: $49.1 million

Bugsy is a 1991 American biographical crime drama film directed by Barry Levinson and written by James Toback. Starring Warren Beatty, Annette Bening, Harvey Keitel, Ben Kingsley, Elliott Gould, Bebe Neuwirth and Joe Mantegna.

The film is based on the rise and fall of mobster Bugsy Siegel and his affair with starlet Virginia Hill.

Bugsy was given a limited release by TriStar Pictures on December 13, 1991, followed by a theatrical wide release on December 20, 1991. It received generally positive reviews from critics. It received ten nominations at the 64th Academy Awards (including for Best Picture and Best Director) and won two: Best Art Direction and Best Costume Design. It won the Golden Globe Award for Best Motion Picture - Drama.

== Plot ==
1941, Benjamin "Bugsy" Siegel, a long-time associate of Meyer Lansky and Charlie Luciano, arrives in Los Angeles. While visiting actor George Raft on the set of Manpower, the gangster instantly falls in love with tough-talking starlet Virginia Hill. He buys a house in Beverly Hills, planning to stay there while his wife Esta and two daughters Millicent and Barbara remain in Scarsdale, New York. Bugsy is tasked by Luciano and Lansky with protecting their lucrative bookmaking rackets run in partnership with weak Los Angeles crime family boss Jack Dragna. Ascending local Jewish gangster Mickey Cohen robs Dragna's operation one day. He is confronted by Bugsy, decides to do business with Cohen rather than Dragna. Cohen is put in charge of the betting casinos; Dragna is forced to confess to a raging Bugsy that he stole $14,000 and is told he now answers to Cohen.

After arguments about Virginia's trysts with drummer Gene Krupa and various bullfighters as well as Bugsy's reluctance to get a divorce, Virginia makes a romantic move on Bugsy. On a trip to Nevada to make a maintenance call to a rough gambling joint, Bugsy is struck with the inspiration for a luxury hotel and casino in the desert of Nevada. This happens to be in the only state where gambling is legal.

Bugsy obtains $1 million in funding from Lansky and other New York City mobsters, on the motion of going big, doing it legit in Nevada. Virginia wants no part of it until Bugsy offers her a share, puts her in charge of accounting and begins constructing the Flamingo Las Vegas in Las Vegas. However, the budget soon soars out of control to over $6 million. Bugsy ultimately has to relinquish his own share to cover some of the losses.

Bugsy receives a visit from gangster Harry Greenberg, who has betrayed his old associates to save himself but has now run out of money from a combination of his gambling habits and being extorted by prosecutors who want his testimony. Harry begs him for help; after taking him to a secluded spot so they can talk privately, Bugsy shoots his friend Harry dead. He is arrested for the murder but the only witness, the cab driver who dropped Harry off in front of Bugsy's house, soon disappears after being paid off.

Lansky waits for Bugsy outside the jail and gives a satchel of money to his friend, though he warns Bugsy that he will no longer be able to protect him. A rainstorm ruins the Flamingo's opening night and $2 million of the budget is unaccounted for. Bugsy discovers that Virginia stole the money, but lets her keep it. He suggests Lansky never sell his share of the casino because he will live to thank him someday. Returning to Los Angeles, Bugsy is shot and killed in his home. Learning the news in Las Vegas, Virginia runs outside into the rain.

The end title cards state that one week after Bugsy's death, Virginia returned all of the missing money to Lansky and later committed suicide in Austria. By 1991, the $6 million invested in Bugsy's Las Vegas dream had generated revenues of $100 billion.

== Cast ==
- Warren Beatty as Benjamin "Bugsy" Siegel
- Annette Bening as Virginia Hill
- Harvey Keitel as Mickey Cohen
- Ben Kingsley as Meyer Lansky
- Elliott Gould as Harry Greenberg
- Joe Mantegna as George Raft
- Bebe Neuwirth as Countess Dorothy di Frasso
- Bill Graham as Charlie "Lucky" Luciano
- Lewis Van Bergen as Joe Adonis
- Wendy Phillips as Esta Siegel, Bugsy's first wife
- Richard C. Sarafian as Jack Dragna
- Carmine Caridi as Frank Costello
- Andy Romano as Del Webb, general contractor for The Flamingo
- Wendie Malick as Inez Malick
- Stefanie Mason as Millicent Siegel, Bugsy's elder daughter
- Kimberly McCullough as Barbara Siegel, Bugsy's younger daughter
- Don Calfa as Louie Dragna, Jack Dragna's nephew and cohort
- Ray McKinnon as David Hinton, architectural designer of the Flamingo
- Joe Baker as Lawrence Tibbett, a famed opera singer whose house Bugsy buys
- Ksenia Prohaska as Marlene Dietrich, George Raft's co-star in Manpower
- Giancarlo Scandiuzzi as Count di Frasso, an Italian aristocrat and personal friend of Benito Mussolini
- Joseph Roman and James Toback as Moe Sedway and Gus Greenbaum, the mobsters who take control of The Flamingo after Bugsy's murder

Other cast members in smaller roles include Robert Glaudini as Dominic Manzella, Jack Dragna's hatchet man; Eric Christmas as Ronald the butler, Robert Beltran as Alejandro, Don Carrara as Vito Genovese, Bryan Smith as Chick Hill, Virginia's brother; Traci Lind as Natalie St. Clair, and Debrah Farentino as Bugsy's one-night stand.

== Production ==
Warren Beatty's desire to make and star in a film about Bugsy Siegel can be traced back to the late 1970s and early 1980s. After completing Reds (1981), Beatty had several projects that he wanted to do but his two dream projects were to produce, star and possibly direct the life story of Howard Hughes and the life story of Siegel. Beatty stated that of all the characters he played in films, such as Clyde Barrow in Bonnie and Clyde (1967) and John Reed in Reds, he felt that he was the right actor to play both Siegel and Hughes.

Beatty was fascinated by Siegel, who he thought was a strange emblem of America (an American gangster who was the son of Jewish immigrants Max and Jennie Siegel who became fascinated with Hollywood and who also envisioned a desert city in which legal gambling is allowed). Several filmmakers attempted to make a film based on Siegel's life, most famously French director Jean-Luc Godard, who wrote a script entitled The Story and envisioned Robert De Niro as Siegel and Diane Keaton as Virginia Hill. In the late 1970s, Beatty met screenwriter James Toback, with whom he became fast friends when Beatty was preparing Heaven Can Wait. Years later, when Beatty was in pre-production on Ishtar, he asked Toback to write a script on Siegel.

During the course of six years and in between two films that he was involved in, Toback wrote a 400-page document of Siegel's life. However, under some strange circumstances, Toback lost the entire document. Under pressure from Warner Bros., who Beatty learned also had a Bugsy Siegel script ready to be produced, Beatty pursued Toback to write a script based on his lost document. Toback handed his new script to Beatty. Beatty approved it and went to several studios in hopes of obtaining financing and distribution for the film. Beatty presented Toback's script to Warner Bros. and claimed that it was much better than the one that Warner Bros. was interested in producing. Warner Bros. passed on the project and Beatty eventually got the backing of TriStar Pictures.

Initially, Toback was under the impression that he would be the director. For a while, Beatty could not find a director (he did not know or chose not to know of Toback's desire to direct the film). Beatty feared that he would be stuck in the position of having to direct the film himself. He said, "I'm in just about every scene of the picture, and I didn't want to have to do all that other work." However, Beatty announced to Toback that Barry Levinson was on board to direct Bugsy. At first, Toback was disappointed, but he quickly learned that Levinson was the right person for the job. Despite the length of the script (which would have run three and a half to four hours), Beatty, Levinson and Toback condensed it to a two-and-a-half to three-hour script. The trio worked very closely together during the production of the film.

During casting, Beatty wanted Annette Bening to play the role of Virginia Hill. Before Bugsy, Bening was a candidate to play Tess Trueheart in Beatty's Dick Tracy. After seeing her audition, Beatty phoned Levinson and told him, "She's terrific. I love her. I'm going to marry her". Levinson thought Beatty was just excited at her audition and did not think that Beatty actually meant what he had said. Both Beatty and Bening stated that their relationship started after completing the film. Later that summer, Bening became pregnant with her and Beatty's first child, which resulted in a tabloid/media frenzy at the time. The child, Stephen Ira Beatty, was born January 8, 1992, and the couple married on March 12. Before Bening's casting, Michelle Pfeiffer was considered for the role of Virginia Hill, but turned it down.

Originally, Beatty played Siegel with a heavy New York City accent (which can be heard in the trailer). However, both Levinson and Toback thought that the accent was not right, so Beatty dropped the accent (which he thought was "charming") and used his normal voice. Principal photography began in January 1991 and filming wrapped in May 1991. Locations included Los Angeles, Pasadena, California, Coachella Valley, California, and the Mojave Desert.

== Release ==
Bugsy premiered at the Museum of Modern Art in New York City on December 10, 1991. It had a limited release on December 13, 1991, and was released nationwide on December 20, 1991. Director Barry Levinson would later complain about how TriStar Studios promoted and distributed the film, deeming that they did not invest on it as much as their other release of that month, Hook. A director's cut was released on DVD, containing an additional 13 minutes not seen in the theatrical version.

== Reception ==
On Rotten Tomatoes the film has a rating of 84% with a mean of 7.1 of a possible 10 based on 64 reviews. The site's critical consensus reads, "Stylishly scattered, Bugsy offers cinematic homage to the infamous underworld legend, chiefly through a magnetic performance from Warren Beatty in the title role." Metacritic gave the film a score of 80 based on 27 reviews, indicating "generally favorable" reviews. Audiences polled by CinemaScore gave the film an average grade of "B" on an A+ to F scale.

Film critic Roger Ebert gave the film four of four stars, saying "Bugsy moves with a lightness that belies its strength. It is a movie that vibrates with optimism and passion, with the exuberance of the con-man on his game."

== Accolades ==
Award	Category	Nominee(s)	Result	Ref.
Academy Awards	Best Picture	Mark Johnson, Barry Levinson, and Warren Beatty	Nominated	
Academy Awards	Best Director	Barry Levinson	Nominated	
Academy Awards	Best Actor	Warren Beatty	Nominated	
Academy Awards	Best Supporting Actor	Harvey Keitel	Nominated	
Academy Awards	Best Supporting Actor	Ben Kingsley	Nominated	
Academy Awards	Best Screenplay – Written Directly for the Screen	James Toback	Nominated	
Academy Awards	Best Art Direction	Art Direction: Dennis Gassner; Set Decoration: Nancy Haigh	Won	
Academy Awards	Best Cinematography	Allen Daviau	Nominated	
Academy Awards	Best Costume Design	Albert Wolsky	Won	
Academy Awards	Best Original Score	Ennio Morricone	Nominated	
American Society of Cinematographers Awards	Outstanding Achievement in Cinematography in Theatrical Releases	Allen Daviau	Won	
Artios Awards	Outstanding Achievement in Feature Film Casting – Drama	Ellen Chenoweth	Nominated	
Bambi Awards	Film – International	Ben Kingsley	Won	
Berlin International Film Festival	Golden Bear	Barry Levinson	Nominated	
Chicago Film Critics Association Awards	Best Director	Barry Levinson	Nominated	
Chicago Film Critics Association Awards	Best Actor	Warren Beatty	Nominated	
Chicago Film Critics Association Awards	Best Actress	Annette Bening	Nominated	
Chicago Film Critics Association Awards	Best Supporting Actor	Harvey Keitel	Won	
Chicago Film Critics Association Awards	Best Screenplay	James Toback	Nominated	
Dallas–Fort Worth Film Critics Association Awards	Best Film		Nominated	
Dallas–Fort Worth Film Critics Association Awards	Best Actor	Warren Beatty	Nominated	
Dallas–Fort Worth Film Critics Association Awards	Best Supporting Actor	Harvey Keitel	Nominated	
Dallas–Fort Worth Film Critics Association Awards	Best Cinematography	Allen Daviau	Nominated	
Directors Guild of America Awards	Outstanding Directorial Achievement in Motion Pictures	Barry Levinson	Nominated	
Golden Globe Awards	Best Motion Picture – Drama		Won	
Golden Globe Awards	Best Actor in a Motion Picture – Drama	Warren Beatty	Nominated	
Golden Globe Awards	Best Actress in a Motion Picture – Drama	Annette Bening	Nominated	
Golden Globe Awards	Best Supporting Actor – Motion Picture	Harvey Keitel	Nominated	
Golden Globe Awards	Best Supporting Actor – Motion Picture	Ben Kingsley	Nominated	
Golden Globe Awards	Best Director – Motion Picture	Barry Levinson	Nominated	
Golden Globe Awards	Best Screenplay – Motion Picture	James Toback	Nominated	
Golden Globe Awards	Best Original Score – Motion Picture	Ennio Morricone	Nominated	
Los Angeles Film Critics Association Awards	Best Film		Won	
Los Angeles Film Critics Association Awards	Best Director	Barry Levinson	Won	
Los Angeles Film Critics Association Awards	Best Actor	Warren Beatty	Runner-up	
Los Angeles Film Critics Association Awards	Best Screenplay	James Toback	Won	
MTV Movie Awards	Best Kiss	Warren Beatty and Annette Bening	Nominated	
National Board of Review Awards	Top Ten Films		2nd Place	
National Board of Review Awards	Best Actor	Warren Beatty	Won	
National Society of Film Critics Awards	Best Film		3rd Place	
National Society of Film Critics Awards	Best Actor	Warren Beatty	2nd Place	
National Society of Film Critics Awards	Best Supporting Actor	Elliott Gould	3rd Place	
National Society of Film Critics Awards	Best Supporting Actor	Harvey Keitel (also for Mortal Thoughts and Thelma & Louise)	Won	
National Society of Film Critics Awards	Best Screenplay	James Toback	2nd Place	
National Society of Film Critics Awards	Best Cinematography	Allen Daviau	3rd Place	
Writers Guild of America Awards	Best Screenplay – Written Directly for the Screen	James Toback	Nominated	

The film is recognized by American Film Institute in these lists:

- 2003: AFI's 100 Years...100 Heroes & Villains:
  - Bugsy Siegel – Nominated Villain
- 2005: AFI's 100 Years...100 Movie Quotes:
  - Virginia Hill: "Why don't you go outside and jerk yourself a soda?" – Nominated
- 2008: AFI's 10 Top 10:
  - Nominated Gangster Film

== See also ==
- List of films set in Las Vegas
