= Virginia Hill =

American mobster (1916–1966)

- Hill at the Kefauver Committee, 1951
- Born: Onie Virginia Hill; August 26, 1916; Lipscomb, Alabama, U.S.
- Died: March 24, 1966 (aged 49); Koppl, Salzburg, Austria
- Other names: Virginia Hill–Hauser; Queen of The Mob; Onie Virginia Hauser
- Years active: 1934–1954
- Known for: Member of the Chicago's Outfit and as mobster Bugsy Siegel's girlfriend
- Spouses: George Randell (m. 1931; div. 1934) Osgood Griffin (m. 1939; ann. 1939) Carlos Valadez Gonzalez (m. 1940; div. 1944) Hans Hauser (m. 1950)
- Partner: Bugsy Siegel (1945–47)
- Children: Peter Hauser

Virginia Hill (born Onie Virginia Hill; August 26, 1916 – March 24, 1966) was an American organized crime figure. An Alabama native, she became a Chicago Outfit courier during the mid-1930s. She was famous for being the girlfriend of mobster Bugsy Siegel.

== Early life ==
Born Onie Virginia Hill on August 26, 1916, in Lipscomb, Alabama, she was one of ten kids of an alcoholic marble worker. By the time she was eight, she moved to Marietta, Georgia with her mother and siblings after her parents separated. She attended Roberts Grammar School, where she completed eighth grade, then dropped out. In November 1931, when she was 15, she married 16-year-old George Randell.

== Association with organized crime ==
In 1933, Hill left Georgia for Chicago with Randell, hoping to enter the pornography business. Once in Chicago, she separated from Randell, divorcing him the following year. She found a job as a waitress at the mob-run San Carlo Italian Village exhibit during the 1933 Century of Progress Chicago's World Fair, and supplemented her income as a prostitute.

She came to the attention of a wealthy bookmaker and gambler, Joseph Epstein, who is said to have become her financial advisor and, possibly, lover (although Epstein was reputed to be gay). Ultimately, she entered into the Chicago Outfit crime organization. In addition to allegedly acting as a mistress to members of the Chicago Mob, she served as a courier to pass messages between mobsters. One contemporary commentator described her as:

... more than just another set of curves. She had ... a good memory, a considerable flair for hole-in-the-corner diplomacy to allay the suspicions of trigger-happy killers and a dual personality, close-lipped about essentials, and able to chatter freely, and apparently foolishly about inconsequentials.

Even law enforcement eventually concluded that she was a "central clearing house" for intelligence on organized crime and enjoyed an independent power base within the Mafia.

Eventually Hill became associated with Charles Fischetti, a cousin and bodyguard of Al Capone. It was Fischetti who sent her to New York to keep tabs on Luciano family capo Joe Adonis, which she did by becoming his lover. She told people that she was a Southern-belle society girl who had gone through four rich husbands, all divorced or dead, and that she had received $1 million each from their estates, but authentic socialites saw through the ruse. She built up an entourage of hangers-on and Latin gigolos hanging out on Broadway and frequently picked up the check.

While in New York, she was introduced to another Luciano associate, Bugsy Siegel, and they ended up in a hotel together that night. Later Siegel's and Hill's separate life paths brought them both to Hollywood, and they began a torrid affair. There were rumors that she and Siegel were secretly married in Mexico after Siegel divorced his wife Esta in 1946, but there has not been any evidence to prove the theory.

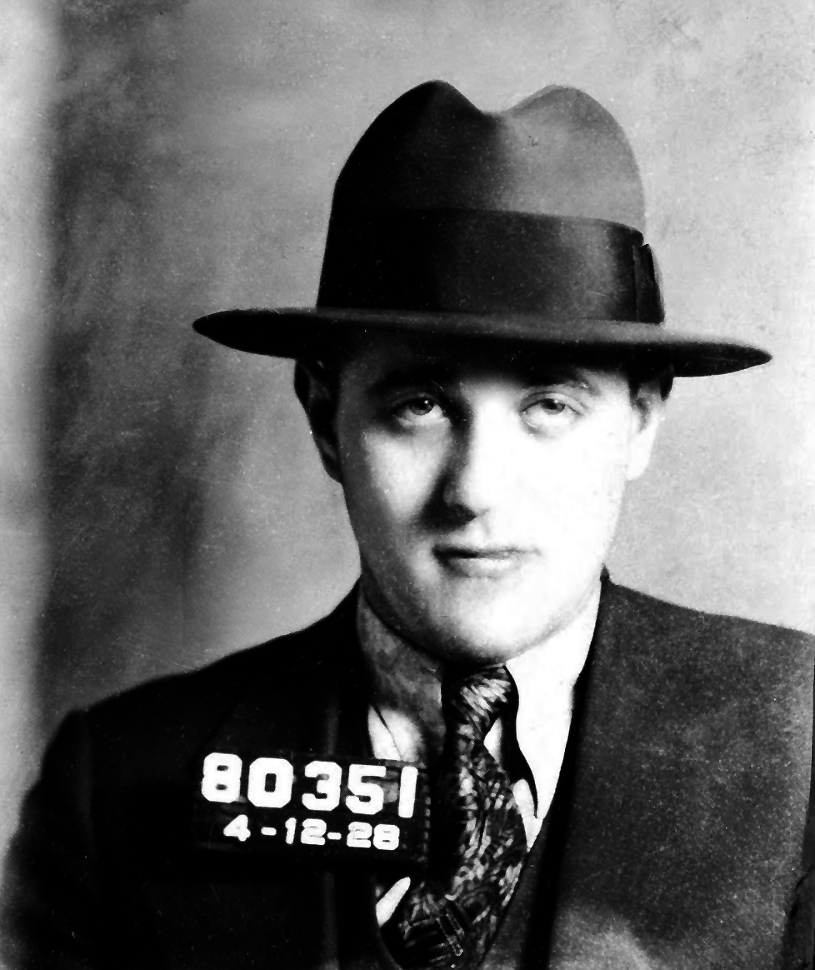
Hill's boyfriend, Benjamin "Bugsy" Siegel NYC police mugshot on April 12, 1928.

Flamingo founder Billy Wilkerson named the Flamingo, long before Benjamin Siegel got involved. Urban legend has it wrong that Siegel named the Flamingo Las Vegas resort after Hill, who liked to gamble and whose nickname was supposedly "Flamingo", a moniker that Siegel was said to have given her, referring to her long, thin legs, but others have said that she was in fact short and somewhat matronly in form. Another story about the origin of the nickname said that after a few drinks, her face would flush a flamingo-like pink. However, organized crime king Lucky Luciano wrote in his memoir that Siegel once owned an interest in the Hialeah Park Race Track and viewed the local flamingo population as a good omen. The "Flamingo" name was given to the project at its inception by original resort financier Billy Wilkerson.

Four days before Siegel was assassinated at the home he leased for her in California (June 1947), she took an unscheduled flight to Paris, France giving rise to speculation that she was warned of Siegel's impending murder.

In 1950, she married Hermann Johann "Hans" Hauser (1911–1974), an Austrian skier (and head of the Sun Valley, Idaho Ski School); later giving birth to their only child, Peter Hauser (1950–1994). In 1951, she was subpoenaed to testify before the Kefauver hearings, where she denied having any knowledge of organized crime despite being described by Time magazine in March of that year as the "queen of the gangsters' molls". After Hill was indicted for income tax evasion in 1954, she moved to Europe, where she lived for the rest of her life with her son.

== Death and legacy ==
Hill committed suicide by an overdose of sleeping pills in Koppl, near Salzburg, Austria, on March 24, 1966, at the age of 49. She is buried in Aigen Cemetery in Salzburg. According to Andy Edmonds' biography Bugsy's Baby: The Secret Life of Mob Queen Virginia Hill, her death was suspicious despite it being an apparent suicide. The Austrian media, which were well informed about her former relationship with Siegel, speculated that she tried to get money by using her knowledge of the Italian-American Mafia.

Hill's appearance at the 1951 Kefauver Hearings was given brief forty second passing satire by an uncredited Carolyn Jones in the 1952 crime film noir The Turning Point. She was the subject of a 1974 television movie, in which she was portrayed by Dyan Cannon. She was played by Annette Bening in the 1991 film Bugsy, a dramatization of her relationship with Bugsy Siegel (portrayed by Warren Beatty). She was also the "loose" basis for Joan Crawford's character in the 1950 film noir The Damned Don't Cry.
