= Bugsy Siegel =

American mobster (1906–1947)

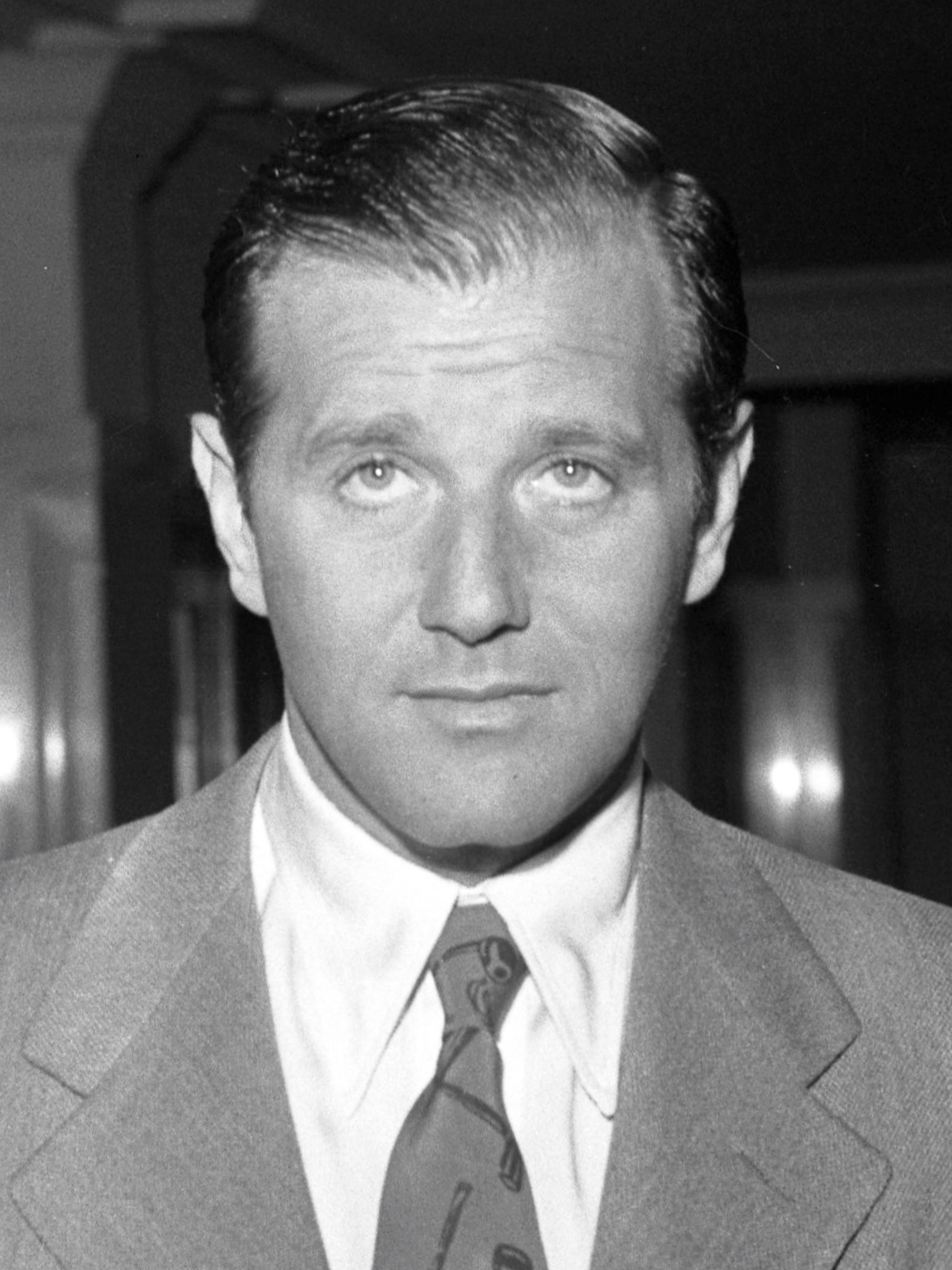
- Siegel in 1944
- Born: Benjamin Siegel; February 28, 1906; New York City, U.S.
- Died: June 20, 1947 (aged 41); Beverly Hills, California, U.S.
- Cause of death: Murder by gunshot wounds
- Resting place: Hollywood Forever Cemetery, Los Angeles, California, U.S.
- Other names: Ben, Benny
- Spouse: Esta Krakower (m. 1929; div. 1946)
- Partners: Wendy Barrie (1942–1943); Virginia Hill (1945–1947)
- Children: 2

Benjamin "Bugsy" Siegel (/ˈsiːɡəl/; February 28, 1906 – June 20, 1947) was an American mobster who was a driving force behind the development of the Las Vegas Strip. Along with his childhood friend and fellow gangster Meyer Lansky, Siegel was influential within the Jewish-American mob, the Italian-American Mafia, and the largely Italian-Jewish coalition known as the National Crime Syndicate. Described as "handsome" and "charismatic," Siegel became one of the first front-page celebrity gangsters.

Siegel was one of the founders and leaders of Murder, Inc. and became a bootlegger during American Prohibition. After the Twenty-first Amendment was passed in 1933 repealing Prohibition, he turned to illegal gambling. In 1936, Siegel left New York and moved to California. His time as a mobster during this period was mainly as a hitman and muscle, as he was noted for his prowess with guns and violence. In 1941, Siegel was tried for the murder of friend and fellow mobster Harry Greenberg, who had turned informant; he was acquitted in 1942.

Siegel traveled to Las Vegas, Nevada, where he handled and financed some of the city's original casinos. He assisted developer William R. Wilkerson's Flamingo Hotel after Wilkerson ran out of funds. Siegel assumed control of the project and managed the final stages of construction. The Flamingo's casino opened on December 26, 1946, in a three-day event that was well received but without a hotel to accompany the casino, the Flamingo struggled and was closed from February 6, 1947 until the hotel was finished and reopened on March 1, 1947. Siegel’s mob partners were convinced that an estimated US$1 million of the construction budget overrun had been skimmed by Siegel, his girlfriend Virginia Hill or by both of them. On June 20, 1947, Siegel was murdered at the age of 41 by a sniper through the window of Hill's Linden Drive mansion in Beverly Hills, California.

== Early life ==
Benjamin Siegel was born on February 28, 1906, in the Williamsburg neighborhood of Brooklyn in New York City, the second of five children of a poor Ashkenazi Jewish family that had emigrated to the U.S. from the Galicia region of what was then Austria-Hungary (now part of Poland and Ukraine). His parents, Jennie (Riechenthal) and Max Siegel, constantly worked for meager wages.

As a boy, Siegel dropped out of school and joined a gang on Lafayette Street on the Lower East Side of Manhattan, mainly committing acts of theft until he met Moe Sedway. Together with Sedway, Siegel developed a protection racket in which he threatened to incinerate pushcart owners' merchandise unless they paid him a dollar. He soon built up a lengthy criminal record, dating from his teenage years, that included armed robbery, rape and murder.

=== The Bugs and Meyer Mob ===
During adolescence, Siegel befriended Meyer Lansky, who applied a brilliant intellect to forming a small mob whose activities expanded to illegal gambling and car theft. Lansky, who had already had a run-in with Charles "Lucky" Luciano, saw a need for the Jewish boys of his Brooklyn neighborhood to organize in the same manner as the Italians and the Irish. The first person he recruited for his gang was Siegel.

Siegel became involved in bootlegging within several major East Coast cities. He also worked as a hitman whom Lansky hired out to other crime families. The two formed the Bugs and Meyer Mob, which handled hits for the various bootleg gangs operating in New York and New Jersey, doing so almost a decade before Murder, Inc. was formed. The gang kept themselves busy by hijacking the liquor cargoes of rival outfits, and were known to be responsible for the killing and removal of several rival gangland figures. Siegel's gang-mates included Abner "Longie" Zwillman, Louis "Lepke" Buchalter and Lansky's brother, Jake; Joseph "Doc" Stacher, another member of the Bugs and Meyer Mob, recalled to Lansky biographers that Siegel was fearless and saved his friends' lives as the mob moved into bootlegging:

"Bugsy never hesitated when danger threatened," Stacher told Uri Dan. "While we tried to figure out what the best move was, Bugsy was already shooting. When it came to action there was no one better. I've never known a man who had more guts."

Siegel was also a boyhood friend to Al Capone; when there was a warrant for Capone's arrest on a murder charge, Siegel allowed him to hide out with an aunt.

Siegel first smoked opium during his youth and was involved in the drug trade. By age 21, he was making enough money to purchase an apartment at the Waldorf Astoria Hotel and a Tudor home in Scarsdale, New York. He also wore flashy clothes and participated in New York City's night life.

From May 13 to 16, 1929, Lansky and Siegel attended the Atlantic City Conference, representing the Bugs and Meyer Mob. Luciano and former Chicago South Side Gang leader Johnny Torrio held the conference at the Ritz-Carlton Hotel in Atlantic City, New Jersey. At the conference, the two men discussed the future of organized crime and the future structure of the Mafia families: Siegel stated, "The yids and the dagos will no longer fight each other."

=== Marriage and family ===
On January 28, 1929, Siegel married Esta Krakower, his childhood sweetheart. They had two daughters, Millicent Siegel (later Millicent Rosen) and Barbara Siegel (later Barbara Saperstein). Siegel had a reputation as a womanizer and the marriage ended in 1946.

=== Affairs ===
While married, Siegel womanized with Ketti Gallian, Wendy Barrie (1942–1943), Marie "The Body" MacDonald, and Virginia Hill (1945–1947).

== Murder, Incorporated ==
By the late 1920s, Lansky and Siegel had ties to Luciano and Frank Costello, future bosses of the Genovese crime family. Siegel, Albert Anastasia, Vito Genovese, and Joe Adonis allegedly were the four gunmen who shot New York mob boss Joe Masseria to death on Luciano's orders on April 15, 1931, ending the Castellammarese War. On September 10 of that year, Luciano hired four gunmen from the Bugs and Meyer Mob (some sources identify Siegel as one of them) to murder Salvatore Maranzano in his New York office, establishing Luciano's rise to the top of the Mafia and marking the beginning of modern American organized crime.

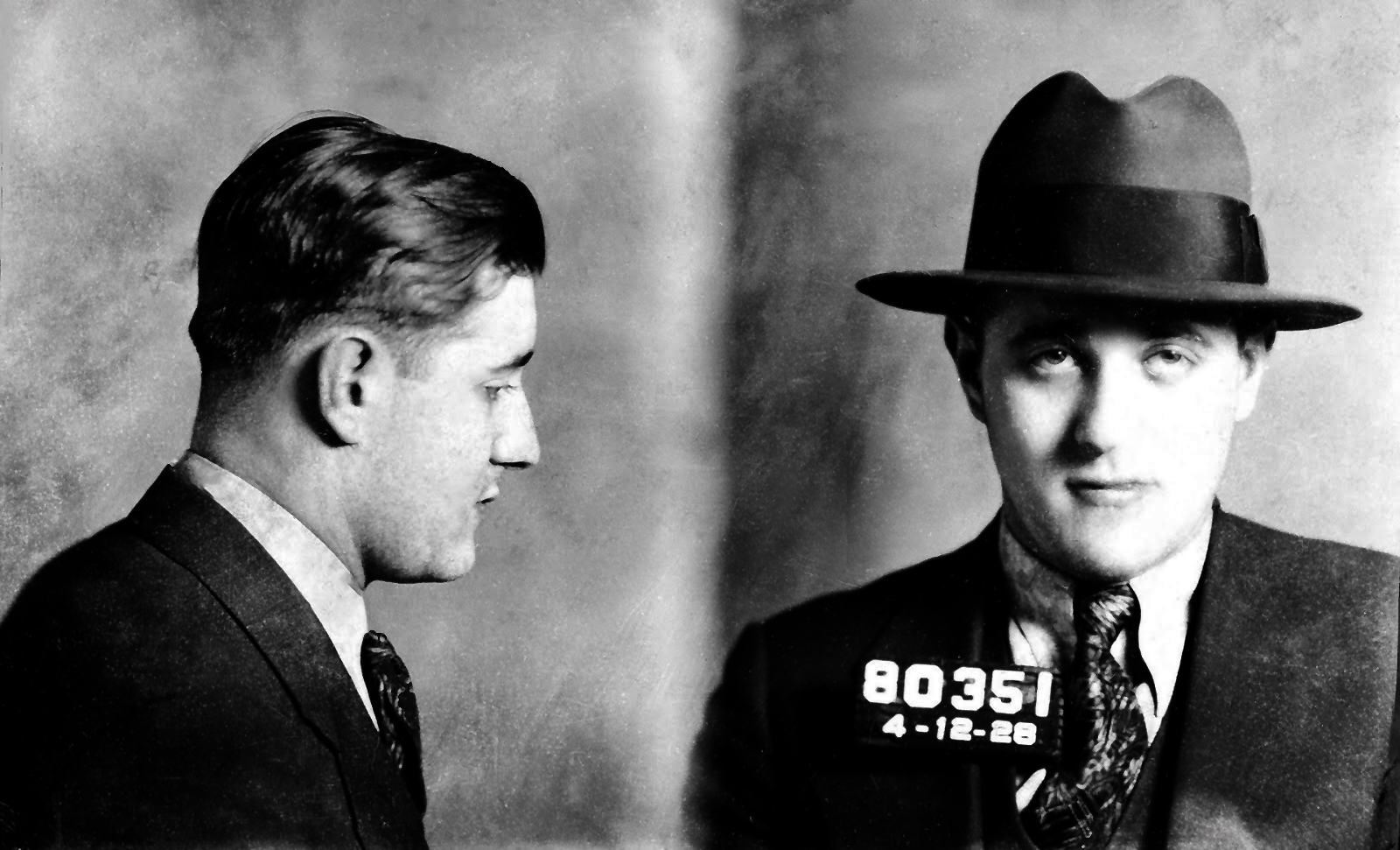
Siegel's mugshot, April 1928

Following Maranzano's death, Luciano and Lansky formed the National Crime Syndicate, a loose organization of inter-ethnic crime families that brought order to the underworld. The Commission, the Italian Mafia's governing body, was established for dividing the families' territories and preventing future gang wars. With his associates, Siegel formed the National Crime Syndicate's enforcement wing: Murder, Inc. After he and Lansky moved on, control over Murder, Inc. was ceded to Buchalter and Anastasia, although Siegel continued working as a hitman. Siegel's only conviction was in Miami: on February 28, 1932, he was arrested for gambling and vagrancy, and from a roll of bills, he paid a $100 fine.

During this period, Siegel got into a dispute with the Fabrizzo brothers, associates of Waxey Gordon. Gordon had hired the brothers from prison after Lansky and Siegel gave the IRS information about Gordon's tax evasion, resulting in Gordon's imprisonment in 1933. Siegel hunted down and killed the Fabrizzos after they made an assassination attempt on him and Lansky by penetrating Siegel's heavily fortified suite at the Waldorf Astoria with a bomb. After the deaths of his two brothers, Tony Fabrizzo had begun to write a memoir and gave it to an attorney. One of the longest chapters was to be a section on the nationwide kill-for-hire squad led by Siegel. However, the mob discovered Tony's plans before he could carry them out. In 1932, after checking into a hospital to establish an alibi and later sneaking out, Siegel joined two accomplices in approaching Tony's house and, posing as detectives to lure him outside, gunned him down. In 1935, Siegel assisted in Luciano's alliance with Dutch Schultz and killed rival loan shark brothers Louis "Pretty" Amberg and Joseph Amberg.

== California ==
Siegel had learned from his associates that he was in danger: his hospital alibi had become questionable and his enemies wanted him dead. In response, the Mafia sent Siegel to California and assigned him with developing syndicate-sanctioned gambling rackets with Los Angeles family boss Jack Dragna. Once in Los Angeles, Siegel recruited gangster Mickey Cohen as his chief lieutenant. Knowing Siegel's reputation for violence, and that he was backed by Lansky and Luciano—who, from prison, sent word to Dragna that it was "in [his] best interest to cooperate"—Dragna accepted a subordinate role. On tax returns, Siegel claimed to earn his living through legal gambling at Santa Anita Park. He soon took over Los Angeles's numbers racket and used money from the syndicate to help establish a drug trade route from Mexico and organized circuits with the Chicago Outfit's wire services.

By 1942, $500,000 a day was coming from the syndicate's bookmaking wire operations. In 1946, because of problems with Siegel, the Outfit took over the Continental Press and gave their percentage of the racing wire to Dragna, infuriating Siegel. Despite his complications with the wire services, Siegel controlled several offshore casinos and a major prostitution ring. He also maintained relationships with politicians, businessmen, attorneys, accountants and lobbyists who fronted for him.

=== Hollywood ===
In Hollywood, Siegel was welcomed in the highest circles and befriended movie stars. He was known to associate with George Raft, Clark Gable, Gary Cooper and Cary Grant, as well as studio executives Louis B. Mayer and Jack L. Warner. Actress Jean Harlow was a friend of Siegel and godmother to his daughter Millicent. Siegel purchased real estate and threw lavish parties at his Beverly Hills home. He gained admiration from young celebrities, including Tony Curtis, Phil Silvers and Frank Sinatra.

Siegel had several relationships with prominent women, including socialite Countess Dorothy di Frasso. The alliance with the countess took Siegel to Italy in 1938, where he met Fascist dictator Benito Mussolini, to whom Siegel tried to sell weapons. Siegel also met Nazi leaders Hermann Göring and Joseph Goebbels, to whom he took an instant dislike and later offered to kill. He only relented because of the countess's anxious pleas.

In Hollywood, Siegel worked with the syndicate to form illegal rackets. He devised a plan of extorting movie studios; he would take over local trade unions and stage strikes to force studios to pay him off so that the unions would start working again. Siegel borrowed money from celebrities and did not pay them back, knowing that they would never ask him for the money. During his first year in Hollywood, he received more than $400,000 in loans from movie stars. He also set up an illegal casino at Castillo del Lago.

=== Selling Atomite to Mussolini ===
According to Siegel's accounts, atomite was a new type of explosive substance that detonated without sound or flash, and Siegel attracted the interest of Mussolini and the Axis powers to purchase it. Mussolini advanced $40,000 to have atomite scaled up, but Siegel failed to detonate the explosive in 1939 during a demonstration to Mussolini and Nazi leaders, including Göring and Goebbels; Mussolini demanded the return of his money.

=== Greenberg murder and trial ===
On November 22, 1939, Siegel, Whitey Krakow, Frankie Carbo and Albert Tannenbaum killed Harry "Big Greenie" Greenberg outside his Hollywood Hills apartment. Greenberg had threatened to become a police informant, and Buchalter ordered his killing. Tannenbaum confessed to the murder and agreed to testify against Siegel. Siegel was implicated in the murder and put on trial in September 1941.

The trial soon gained notoriety because of the preferential treatment that Siegel received in jail: he refused to eat prison food, was allowed female visitors and was granted leave for dental visits. However, Siegel himself protested loudly about "the stories of his privileged incarceration" and behavior during the trial, claiming that they were either untrue or grossly exaggerated. Some reporters wrote that Siegel had a valet in prison, that he had broken down in tears on the stand and that his eyes were brown. Siegel told them: "You can see for yourself that they're not brown" (they were in fact blue).

Press reports also revealed information about Siegel's past and referred to him as "Bugsy." Siegel hated the nickname because it was based on the slang term "bugs," meaning "crazy," and used to describe his erratic behavior; he preferred to be called "Ben" or "Mr. Siegel". Siegel allegedly threatened Hollywood reporter Florabel Muir, "who knew [him] well" and was covering the trial, saying, "You think because I'm locked up here a punk like you can write anything you please ... Maybe you won't be using that typewriter anymore. Maybe your fingers won't be on your hands. I have people outside who'll break your legs or drop you in a hole if I say the word." ... I'm not as bugs as you think. I'm going to beat this rap and then I won't ever have to speak to you newspaper punks."

Siegel hired attorney Jerry Giesler for his defense. Two state witnesses died and no additional witnesses came forward. Tannenbaum's testimony was dismissed. In 1942, Siegel was acquitted due to a lack of evidence, but his reputation was damaged. On May 25, 1944, Siegel was arrested for bookmaking. Raft and Mack Gray testified on his behalf, and he was acquitted again in late 1944.

== Las Vegas ==
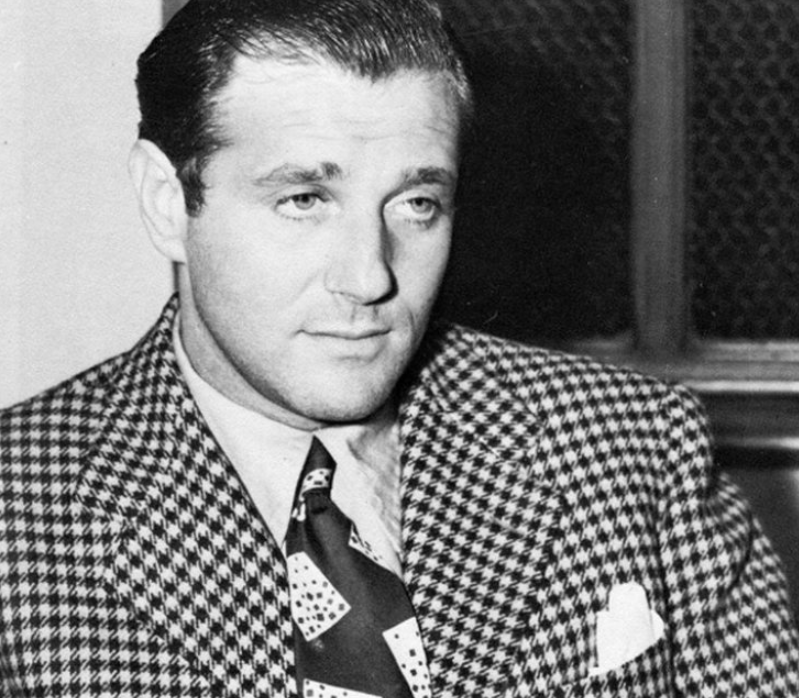
Siegel in Las Vegas

Problems with the Outfit's wire service had cleared up in Nevada and Arizona, but in California, Siegel refused to report business. He later announced to his colleagues that he was running the California syndicate by himself and that he would return the loans in his "own good time." The mob bosses were initially patient with Siegel because he had proven to be a valuable asset.

=== Flamingo Hotel ===
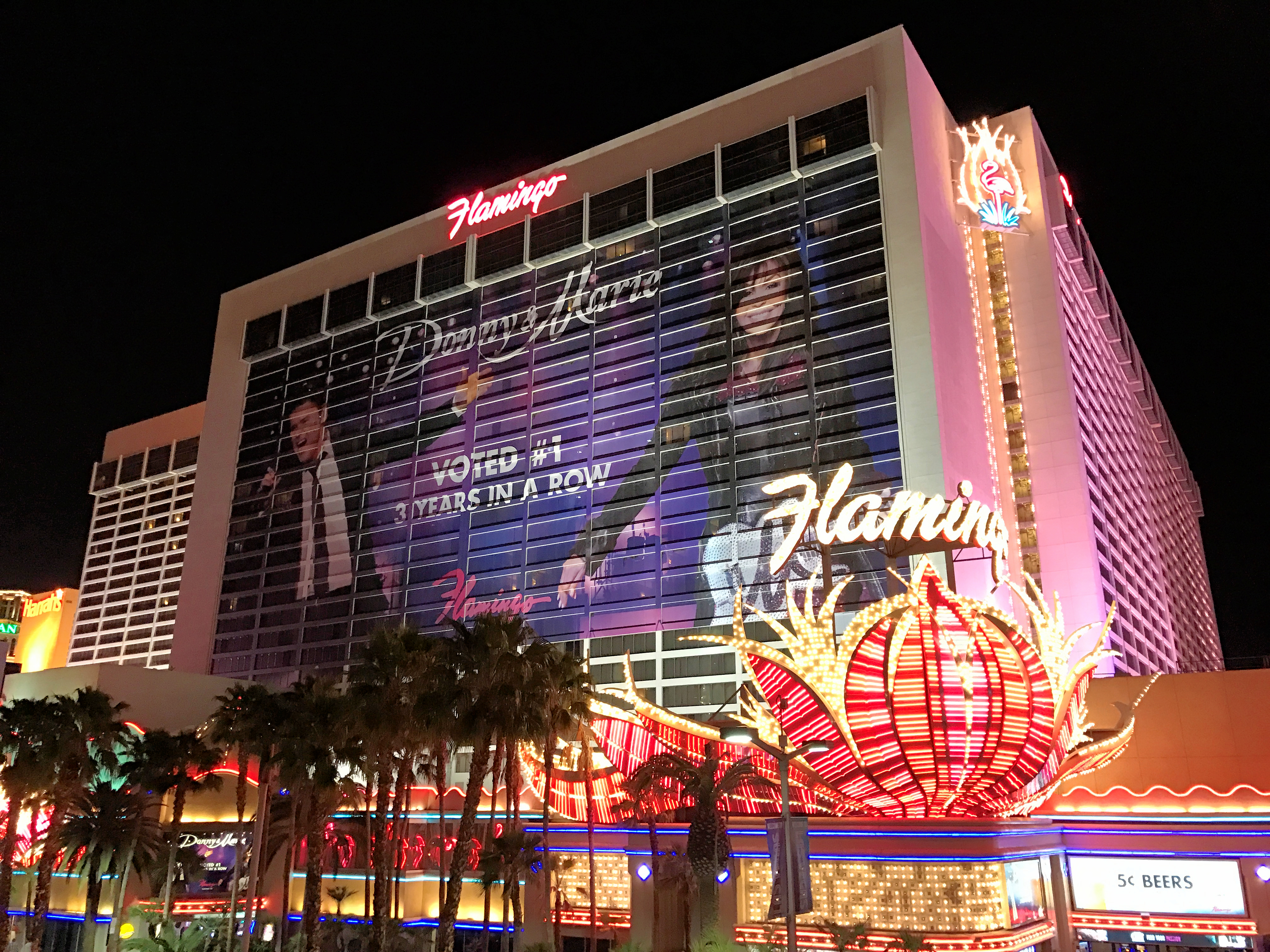
The Flamingo Hotel as seen in 2017

In 1946, Siegel found an opportunity to reinvent his personal image and diversify into legitimate business with William R. Wilkerson's Flamingo Hotel. In the 1930s, Siegel and Sedway had traveled to southern Nevada to explore expanding operations there. He had found opportunities in providing illicit services to crews constructing the Boulder Dam. Lansky had handed over his operations in Nevada to Siegel, who in turn handed them over to Sedway and left for Hollywood.

In the mid-1940s, Siegel was operating in Las Vegas while his lieutenants worked on a business policy to secure all gambling in Los Angeles. In May 1946, he decided that his partnership agreement with Wilkerson had to be altered to give him control of the Flamingo. Within the Flamingo, Siegel would supply the gambling, the best liquor and food and the biggest entertainers at reasonable prices. He believed that these attractions would lure thousands of vacationers willing to gamble $50 or $100, as well as "high rollers." Wilkerson was eventually coerced into selling all stakes in the Flamingo under the threat of death, and he went into hiding in Paris for a time. From this point the Flamingo became syndicate-run. By October 1946, the Flamingo's costs were above $4 million. The following year, the costs were over $6 M (equivalent to $75 M in 2025). By late November 1947, the work was nearly finished.

According to later reports by local observers, Siegel's "maniacal chest-puffing" set the pattern for several generations of notable casino moguls. He boasted one day that he had personally killed some men; he saw the panicked look on the face of head contractor Del Webb and reassured him, "Del, don't worry, we only kill each other." Other associates portrayed Siegel in a different aspect; he was an intense character who was not without a charitable side, including his donations for the Damon Runyon Cancer Fund. Siegel's Las Vegas attorney, Lou Weiner Jr., described him as "very well liked" and said that he was "good to people."

==== Opening ====
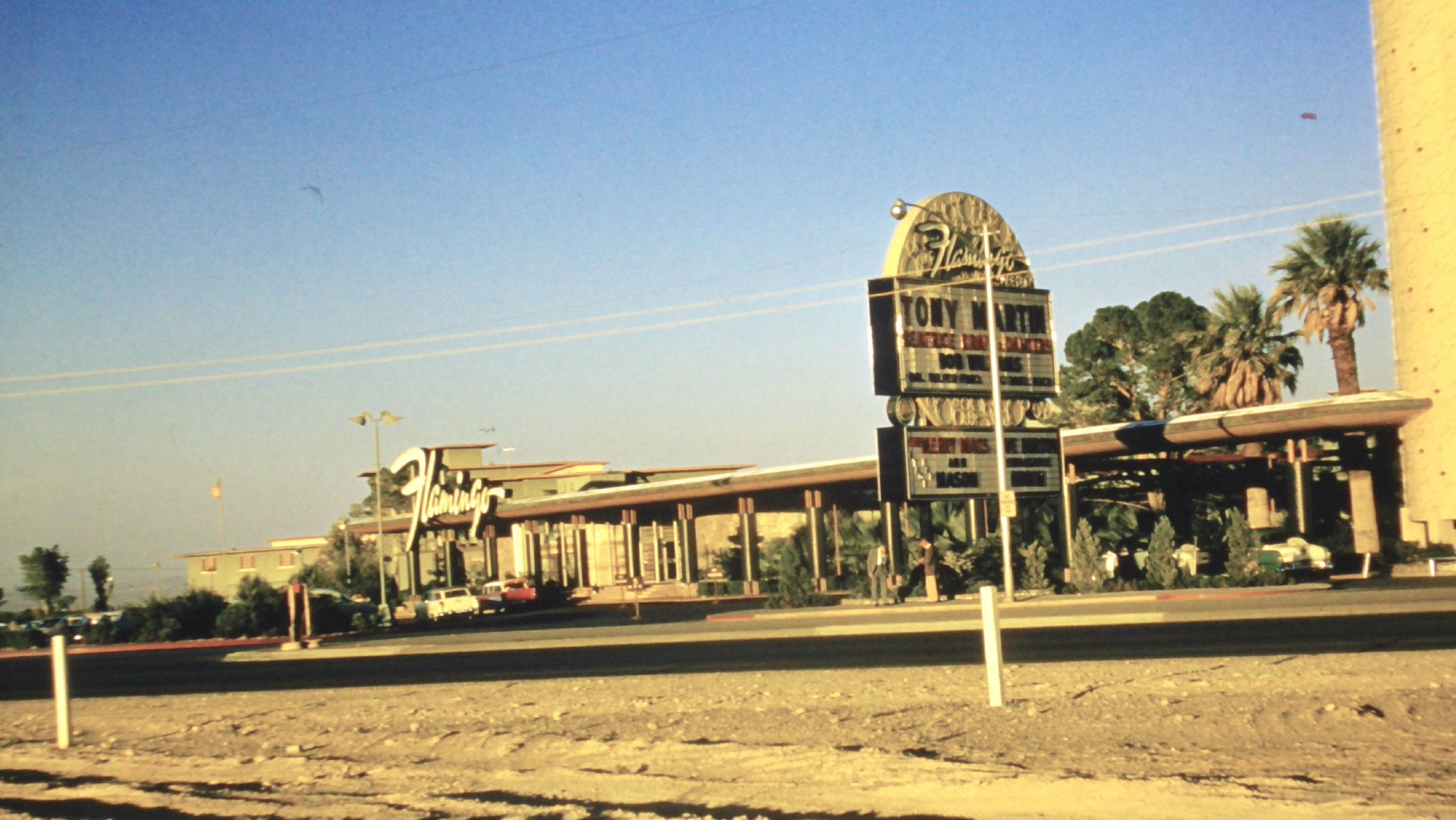
The Flamingo as seen a decade after its opening and retaining the original structure that was built prior to its opening.

The Flamingo opened on December 26, 1946, despite being unfinished. Locals attended the opening, and some celebrities present included Raft, June Haver, Vivian Blaine, Sonny Tufts, Brian Donlevy and Charles Coburn. They were welcomed by construction noise and a lobby draped with drop cloths. When word made its way to Siegel during the evening that the casino was losing money, he became verbally abusive and threw out at least one family.

After two weeks, the Flamingo's gaming tables were $275,000 in the red and the casino briefly shut down. Siegel continued construction and hired Hank Greenspun as a publicist. The Flamingo reopened on March 1, 1947, and began turning a profit. However, by this point Siegel's superiors in the Outfit had lost their patience with him.

== Death ==
On the night of June 20, 1947, Siegel sat on a sofa reading a copy of the Los Angeles Times, together with his associate Allen Smiley, in the living room of 810 North Linden Drive, the Beverly Hills mansion that he had leased for his girlfriend Virginia Hill. Also present in the residence were Hill's brother, Chick Hill; Chick's girlfriend; Jerry Mason; and Eung S. Lee, the residence's cook.

A little before 11:00 p.m., an unknown assailant fired into the living room through a window with a .30 caliber M1 carbine at a range of just fourteen feet (4.3 m) from an archway in the driveway of the house, resting his weapon on a trellis just outside the window. The assailant could not be seen from the street due to an abundance of shrubbery. A total of nine rounds were fired, "four of which found their mark. One hit the bridge of [Siegel]'s nose and ripped out his left eye, a second entered his right cheek and exited at the back of his neck, and two hit him in the chest." According to Muir, who was "one of the first reporters on the scene," and who had spoken to Siegel earlier that day, the remaining shots "destroyed a white marble statue of Bacchus on a grand piano, and then lodged in the far wall." Muir also stated that she noticed Siegel's left eyeball lying on the ground, and "picked up the sliver of flesh from which his long eyelashes extended." Smiley's arm had been grazed by a bullet, but he was otherwise unharmed.

Clark Fogg, the senior forensic specialist in the Beverly Hills Police Department, concluded that Siegel was most likely slain by two shooters, claiming that "it would have been nearly impossible for just one gunman" to make such precise shots to his face because "the mobster's head would have turned upon impact from the first bullet." No one was ever charged with killing Siegel, and the murder remains officially unsolved.

One theory holds that Siegel's death was due to his excessive spending and possible theft of money from the mob. In 1946, a meeting had been held with the "board of directors" of the National Crime Syndicate in Havana, so that Luciano, who by that time had been exiled in Sicily, could attend. A contract on Siegel's life was the conclusion. According to Stacher, Lansky reluctantly agreed to the decision. The coordination of the hit was evidenced by its immediate aftermath: Just minutes after Siegel was gunned down in Beverly Hills, three of Lansky's associates (Gus Greenbaum, Moe Sedway and David Berman) walked into the Flamingo Hotel and announced a change in management. The men who took over were Moe Sedway, Gus Greenbaum, David Berman and Moris Rosen, a mob associate and investor who helped organize the buyout of Siegel's remaining interest.

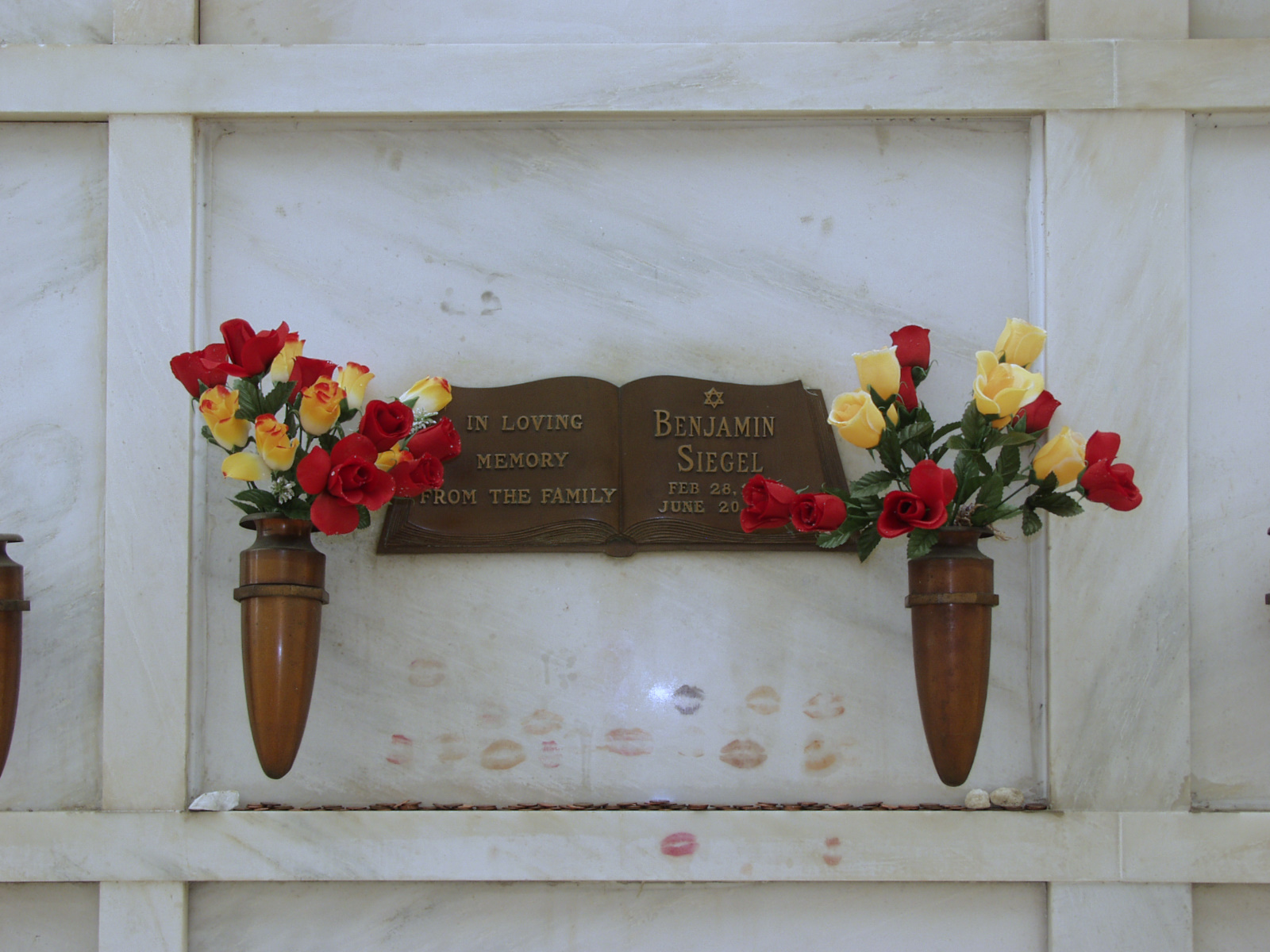
Bugsy Siegel crypt at Hollywood Forever Cemetery

Another theory claims that Siegel was shot to death preemptively by Mathew "Moose" Pandza, the lover of Sedway's wife Bee, who went to Pandza after learning that Siegel was threatening to kill her husband. Siegel apparently had grown increasingly resentful of the control Sedway was exerting over his finances and planned to do away with him. Former Philadelphia family boss Ralph Natale claimed that Carbo was responsible for killing Siegel, at the behest of Lansky. In 1987, former Dragna gopher Eddie Cannizzaro claimed that he killed Siegel under a contract issued by Lansky.

Siegel's death certificate states the cause of death as homicide and the immediate cause as "Cerebral Hemorrage [sic] due to Gunshot Wounds of the Head."

The day after Siegel's death, the Los Angeles Herald-Express carried a photograph on its front page from the morgue of Siegel's bare right foot with a toe tag. Although his murder occurred in Beverly Hills, his death thrust Las Vegas into the national spotlight as photographs of his lifeless body were published in newspapers throughout the country.

=== Memorials ===
In the Bialystoker Synagogue on New York's Lower East Side, Siegel is memorialized by a Yahrtzeit (remembrance) plaque that marks his death date so mourners can say Kaddish for the anniversary. Siegel's plaque is below that of Max Siegel, his father, who died just two months before his son. On the property at the Flamingo Las Vegas, between the pool and a wedding chapel, is a memorial plaque to Siegel.

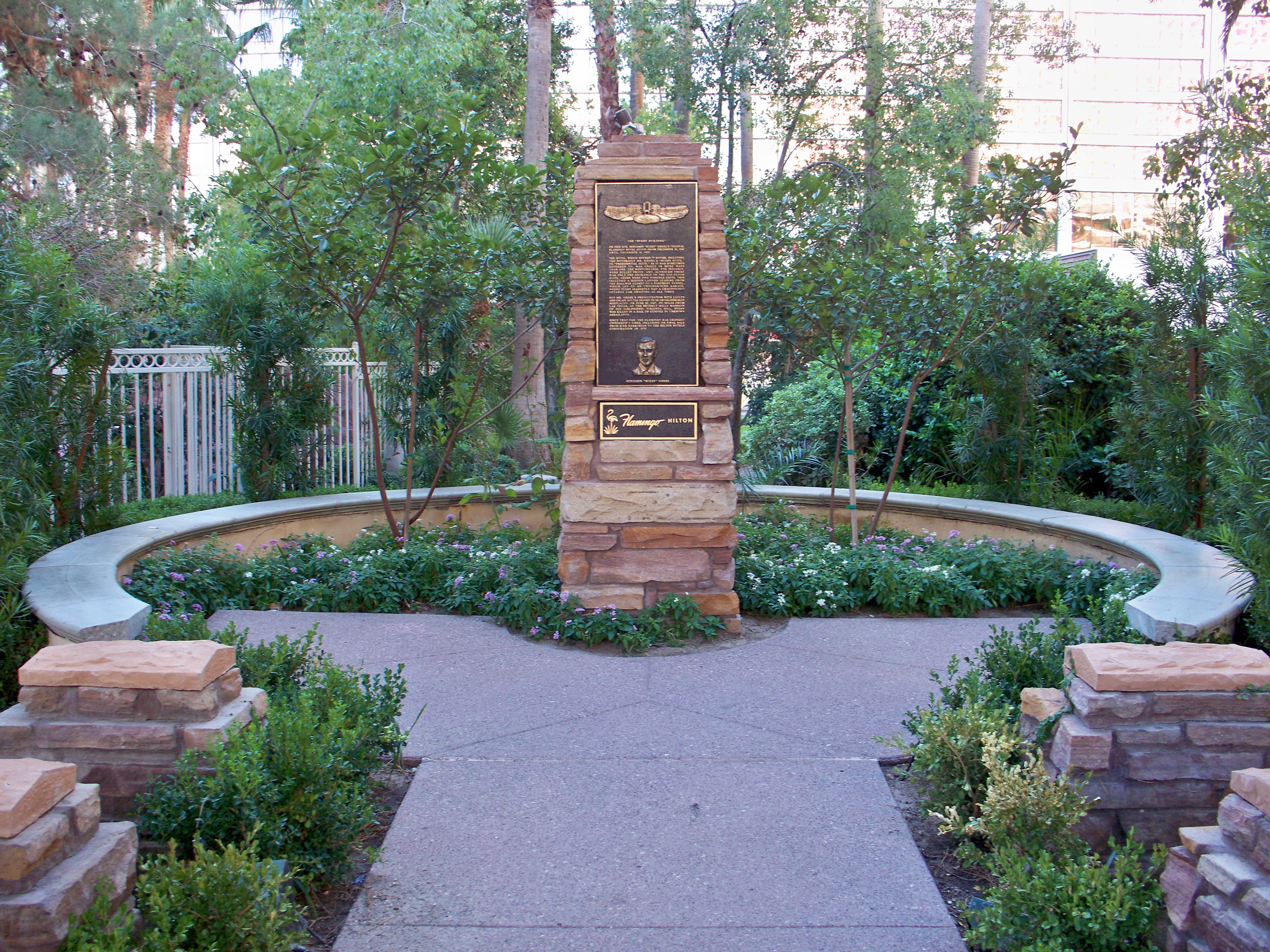
Siegel's memorial outside the wedding chapel at the Flamingo

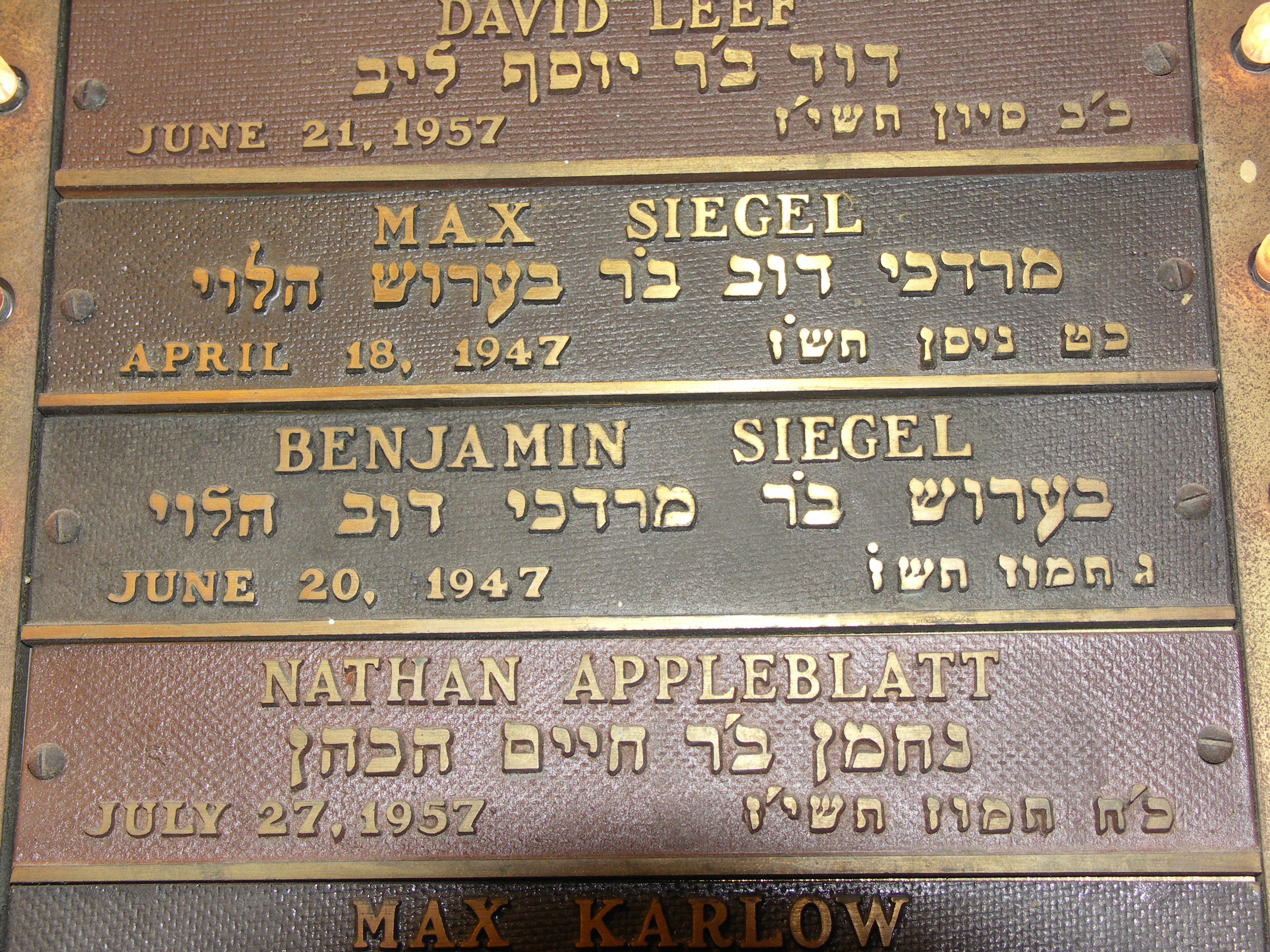
Siegel's memorial plaque at the Bialystoker Synagogue

== Media portrayals ==
- Morris "Moe" Greene is a fictional character appearing in Mario Puzo's 1969 novel The Godfather and its 1972 film adaptation. The role of Greene's character and his manner of death have been identified as being based on Bugsy Siegel. But the character's name is a portmanteau of two of Lansky's associates who succeeded Siegel (Moe Sedway and Gus Greenbaum), suggesting "Moe Greene" is in fact a mashup based on several Jewish mobsters based in the American West.
- The 1991 motion picture drama Mobsters, depicting the rise of the Commission, focused on the empire built by enterprising young criminals Lucky Luciano (Christian Slater), Meyer Lansky (Patrick Dempsey), and Bugsy Siegel (Richard Grieco).
- Siegel was mentioned in Star Trek: Deep Space Nine season 7, episode 15 Badda-Bing Badda-Bang (February 22, 1999), at the 33 minute 21 second mark. The character Frankie refers to him as "The man who built Las Vegas."
- A character of the same name, portrayed by Edwin Richfield, appears in the sixth episode of the second series of the 1960s cult British spy-fi TV series The Avengers.
- Bugsy (1991) is a highly fictionalized movie biography of Siegel, featuring Warren Beatty in the title role.
- In the 1991 film The Marrying Man, Armand Assante plays Siegel.
- Tim Powers imagined Siegel as a modern-day Fisher King in his novel Last Call (1992).
- A biography of Siegel (a 1995 program from the television series Biography) was released on DVD in 2005. 50 minutes, color with b&w sequences. ISBN 9780767081917
- He is portrayed by Michael Zegen in the HBO series Boardwalk Empire.
- He is a central character in Frank Darabont's television series Mob City, portrayed by Edward Burns.
- He is portrayed by Jonathan Stewart in the AMC series The Making of the Mob: New York, a docudrama focusing on the history of the mob with the first season about Charlie "Lucky" Luciano's life story.
- In Fallout: New Vegas, there is a character named Benny, who is visually based on Siegel. He is also a contributor to the development of the New Vegas Strip, based on the Las Vegas Strip and similar to Siegel's role in the birth of Las Vegas gambling. Benny shares Siegel's charismatic demeanor and criminal background.
- Joe Mantegna portrayed Siegel in the 2015 film Kill Me, Deadly.
- Siegel was mentioned in the song 2 of Amerikaz Most Wanted by Tupac Shakur and Snoop Dogg in the album All Eyez On Me. In the fourth verse, Snoop Dogg raps, "my dream is to own a fly casino, like Bugsy Siegel, and do it all legal."
- Jonathan Sadowski portrayed a heavily fictionalized Siegel in the DC's Legends of Tomorrow episode "Miss Me, Kiss Me, Love Me"; a science fiction series with supernatural overtones, it featured Siegel being resurrected after his assassination, although he is finally terminated in Hell by the character John Constantine.
- David Cade portrays Siegel in the 2021 film Lansky.

== See also ==
- Jewish-American organized crime
- List of unsolved murders (1900–1979)

Business positions
Preceded by	Murder, Inc. Boss; 1931	Succeeded by Lepke Buchalter
Preceded by William R. Wilkerson	Flamingo Hotel; Owner; 1946–1947	Succeeded by Moe Sedway
