= Joseph Toblinsky =

Joseph "Yosky" Toblinsky (1883-January 2, 1944), better known as Joseph "Yesky Nigger" Toplinsky, was a New York City racketeer who, as head of an independent gang on East Side Manhattan, was involved in extortion and poisoning horses with the Yiddish Black Hand during the early 1900s. He was eventually sent to Sing Sing Prison for cruelty to animals in 1902.

Toblinsky was arrested by police when he was identified by a witness as having participated in the hijacking of a truck while driving through Sullivan County on May 23, 1935. Although escaping with $8,000 worth of pharmaceutical drugs as well as kidnapping the driver and his assistant, he would be captured within a month after being taken into custody on July 17.
