= Jake Lansky =

American mobster (died 1983)

- Born: Jacob Suchowljansky; Grodno, Russian Empire (now Hrodna, Belarus)
- Died: July 22, 1983; Miami, Florida, U.S.
- Occupations: Casino manager, mob associate
- Known for: Managing Havana casino operations at the Hotel Nacional de Cuba; associate of the Lansky syndicate
- Relatives: Meyer Lansky (brother)

Jake Lansky was an American mobster and the younger brother of the more infamous Meyer Lansky.

== Career ==
In 1911 the Lansky family moved to the United States.

In 1928 Daniel Ahearn was shot by Bugsy Siegel with Lansky as the getaway driver. When the police arrived a still living Ahearn named Lansky who on 3 March 1928 was charged with felonious assault as Ahearn fought for his life in the hospital. Ahearn survived.

Lansky was a fundamental component of his brother Meyer's gambling operations in South Florida. He arrived in Miami Beach in 1933, later being moved northwards to Hollywood, Florida. He operated casinos on his brothers behalf, including The Colonial Inn, Greenacres, and Boheme. Outside of Florida, his business dealings extended to Los Angeles, California. He was a partner in The Thunderbird hotel.

In September 1950 he was indicted on gambling charges, to which he pled guilty, receiving a $2000 fine. He gained publicity as a result of the US Senate's Kefauver Committee hearings on organized crime. Lansky was never called to testify but his name was frequently mentioned as a partner and front man for his brother Meyer. The committee discovered that Jake and his brother Meyer contributed funds to the election of Sheriff Clark in Florida. He also officially contributed $750 to the Florida Sheriffs Association, Justice of the Peace and Constables Association, Police & Sheriff Association, and the Peace Officers Association. The real amount is presumed to be much higher.

He was also active in Havana, Cuba, where he served as pit boss at the Hotel Nacional casino and had interests in the Hotel Havana Riviera. On one return trip from Cuba Lansky was searched at customs. $200,000 in cash and over $50,000 in checks to be deposited in the Bank of Miami Beach were found in his possession. After Fidel Castro took power and pledged to root organized crime out of Cuba, Lansky was arrested on 6 May 1959 and detained at Triscornia Migratory Camp. He was subsequently released and deported back to the United States on the orders of the Minister of Interior Luis Orlando Rodriguez by the end of the month.

== Personal life ==
He had a wife, Anna, with whom he had two daughters, Roberta and Linda. He died in September 1983, aged 79, eight months after Meyer.

Lansky's relationship with his brother Meyer was a close one, both commercially and personally. Lansky was often thought to be the elder of the two brothers as he was a taller and appeared older. When they were children Lansky would slouch in Meyer's presence as he thought that Meyer was bothered by his shortness. As a result, he was called "Jake the Hunchback" when they were children. Jake was considered the more jovial and sociable of the brothers, in contrast to the typically taciturn Meyer.

Chris Marquette plays a child Lansky in the 1999 film about his brother titled Lansky.
