= Abner Zwillman =

American mob boss

- Born: July 27, 1904; Newark, New Jersey, U.S.
- Died: February 26, 1959 (aged 54); West Orange, New Jersey, U.S.
- Cause of death: Suicide (hanging)
- Resting place: B'nai Abraham Memorial Park, Union, New Jersey, U.S.
- Other names: "Longie", "Abele"
- Occupations: Mobster, businessman, bootlegger
- Spouse: Mary de Groot Mendels Steinbach Zwillman (m. 1939)
- Allegiance: Luciano Family (Associate)

Abner "Longie" Zwillman (July 27, 1904 – February 26, 1959) was a Jewish-American mobster who was based primarily in North Jersey. He was a longtime friend and associate of mobsters Lucky Luciano and Meyer Lansky. Zwillman's criminal organization was a part of the National Crime Syndicate and mainly operated from the 1920s to the 1950s, with its peak in the late 1930s.

Zwillman was the founder of the New Jersey Minutemen, a militant anti-fascist group which operated in Newark, New Jersey from 1933 to 1941. They were antagonists of the pro-Nazi German American Bund and the Christian Front.

== Early life and career ==
Abraham "Abner" Zwillman was born on July 27, 1904, in Newark, New Jersey, the second child of Lithuanian Jews Abraham Reuben (born Abram Tzvilman) and Anna (Ella) Slavinsky, who had emigrated from Skapiškis in 1903 with their daughter, Bessie. His father was a grocer. The couple had five more children – Ethel (Etta), Barney, Frieda (Phoebe), Larry, and Irving – born until his father's death in 1915.

Zwillman was forced to quit school to support his family after his father's death. Zwillman first began working at a Prince Street café, the headquarters of a local alderman in Newark's Third Ward. However, in need of more money, Zwillman was eventually forced to quit, later selling fruits and vegetables in his neighborhood with a rented horse and wagon.

Zwillman was unable to compete with the cheaper Prince Street pushcarts, however, so he moved to the more upper-class neighborhood of Clinton Hill, where he began selling lottery tickets to local housewives. He observed that much more money was made selling lottery tickets than produce, so he concentrated on selling lottery tickets through local merchants. By 1920, Zwillman controlled the bulk of the numbers racket with the help of hired muscle.

=== Prohibition ===
At the start of Prohibition, Zwillman began smuggling whiskey into New Jersey through Canada, using several World War I armored trucks. Zwillman later joined a syndicate headed by Joseph Reinfeld to smuggle liquor from Canada using ships. They were reputed to have controlled 40% of liquor smuggling. Zwillman used this revenue to greatly expand his operations in illegal gambling, prostitution, and labor racketeering, as well as legitimate businesses, including several prominent night clubs and restaurants.

In May 1929 he attended the historic Atlantic City Conference, believed to be the first ever national summit of the American mafia. In 1929, he was sent to prison for six months for assaulting an associate. It was the only crime for which he was ever convicted.

Zwillman dated actress Jean Harlow at one time and got her a two-picture deal at Columbia Pictures by giving a huge cash loan to studio head Harry Cohn. Zwillman also bought Harlow a jeweled bracelet and a red Cadillac. He referred to her in derogatory terms to other mobsters in secret surveillance recordings. He married Mary de Groot Mendels Steinbach in 1939. She was the only daughter of Eugene Mendels, whose father, Emanuel S. Mendels, was a founder of the American Stock Exchange (then known as the Curb Exchange). The Zwillmans had a daughter, Lynn Kathryn Zwillman born c. 1944. Mary Zwillman had a son, who became Abner Zwillman's stepson, from a previous marriage.

=== The "Al Capone of New Jersey" ===
After Dutch Schultz's murder in 1935, Zwillman took over those of Schultz's criminal operations that were in New Jersey. The press began calling Zwillman the "Al Capone of New Jersey." However, Zwillman often sought to legitimize his image, offering a reward for the return of the Lindbergh baby in 1932, and contributed to charities, including $250,000 to a Newark slum-clearing project.

Shortly after taking over Schultz's operations, Zwillman became involved in local politics, eventually controlling the majority of local politicians in Newark for over twenty years. During the 1940s Zwillman, along with long-time associate Willie Moretti, dominated gambling operations in New Jersey, in particular the Marine Room inside Zwillman's Riviera nightclub The Palisades.

In 1951, Zwillman's activities were a major focus of the Kefauver Committee's investigation of organized crime. While Zwillman acknowledged that he was a bootlegger during Prohibition, he insisted that his subsequent businesses were legitimate.

Zwillman was also close to many celebrities, including Joe DiMaggio. When Zwillman was being investigated, along with other alleged "Outfit" members, by the Kefauver Committee he reportedly planted three trunks full of money with DiMaggio to hide it from the IRS. It was not returned after Zwillman's death. He knew the boxer Barney Ross, whom he gifted money to when he was suffering in the throes of a heroin addiction and desperately in need of money.

In 1956, Zwillman was tried for income tax evasion. The jury became deadlocked and the charges were dismissed. Several associates of Zwillman were subsequently arrested and charged with bribing two of the jurors.

== Death ==
During the 1959 McClellan Senate Committee hearings on organized crime, Zwillman was issued a subpoena to testify before the committee. Zwillman was found hanged in his West Orange, New Jersey residence on February 26, 1959, shortly before he was to appear. He was buried at B'nai Abraham Memorial Park, a Jewish cemetery in Union, New Jersey, after a funeral attended by 1,850, including celebrities and his 80-year-old mother, Ella. Though the funeral was presided over by a rabbi, there was an abundance of flowers and an open casket—atypical of Jewish custom.

Zwillman's death was ruled a suicide, attributed to intractable income tax and health problems. His stepson, John Steinbach, said that he was also depressed about Senate investigations into jukebox racketeering and a jury tampering investigation, related to a previous failed attempt to prosecute him.

However, police found bruises on Zwillman's wrists, supporting a theory that Zwillman had been tied up before being hanged. It is often speculated that Vito Genovese had ordered Zwillman killed. Others have alleged that Meyer Lansky, suspecting that the New Jersey gangster had agreed to become a government informant, gave permission for the Italian Mafia to take action against Zwillman. The theory that he was hanged was also supported by deported mobster Charles "Lucky" Luciano, who allegedly told journalist Martin Gosch in Italy that the suicide theory was nonsense, and that before hanging him, Zwillman's killers had trussed him up like a pig. Martin Gosch's biography (which he co-authored with Richard Hammer) of Lucky Luciano is somewhat controversial and considered partly fictional by some mob experts. However, the authors have stated that the contents are entirely based on their interviews with Luciano, who died before the book was published.

Zwillman's widow remarried three years later, to sports figure Harry Wismer.
