= Philip Kovolick =

American mobster (1908–c. 1971)

Philip "The Stick" Kovolick [Kovalick] (September 2, 1908 – April 1971?), also known as Joseph Farvel, Phillip Koblick, Joseph Phillips, Phillip Kovolich, and Phillip Kovolik, was a New York mobster and a longtime associate of labor racketeer Louis "Lepke" Buchalter. He was also one of the closest associates of Meyer Lansky, and assisted Meyer and his brother Jake Lansky in operating the Mob's Hallandale Florida casinos, including the plush "rug joint," the Colonial Inn.

== Capture and arrest ==
He was arrested at a restaurant in Little Italy, Manhattan, and charged with "consorting with known criminals for unlawful purposes" in 1965.

Kovolick fled New York to avoid an indictment to appear before a Manhattan grand jury investigating illegal gambling, bribery and corruption. Authorities were attempting to extradite him back to New York before his disappearance, as assistant district attorney Samuel S. Yasgur filed an affidavit in Miami in February 1971.

The body of Philip Kovolick was found sealed in a steel drum at the bottom of a rock pit in Hallandale, Florida on April 28, 1971, after disappearing on April 7, 1971. Police charged 36-year-old John Alvin Baxter with first degree murder, and he was sentenced to death. Eventually the sentence was commuted to life imprisonment.

== See also ==
- List of solved missing person cases
