= Harry Tietlebaum =

American criminal

Harry Tietlebaum or Teitelbaum (born 1889) was an American organized crime figure in New York's underworld during Prohibition as he was associated of the Bug and Meyer Mob. He was later part of a major heroin smuggling operation with Meyer Lansky and Harry "Nig" Rosen during the early 1930s.
