= Hyman Holtz =

American labor racketeer

- Born: c. 1896
- Died: c. 1939 (aged 42–43)
- Cause of death: Assassination by stabbing
- Body discovered: East River
- Other names: Curly; Little Hymie
- Allegiance: Louis Buchalter; Jacob Orgen (previous)

Hyman "Curly" Holtz (c. 1896 – 1939?), also known as "Little Hymie", was a New York labor racketeer who began working as a labor slugger for Jacob "Little Augie" Orgen during the early 1920s.

== Life and career ==
As with many of the other younger members within the organization, Holtz grew disenchanted serving under Orgen, especially for his involvement in narcotics. Without the consent of his lieutenants, Orgen accepted a $50,000 payoff to settle a strike in the painting industry. When Orgen refused a request to return the money, Holtz was one of the younger members who soon left the organization with Louis "Lepke" Buchalter and later aligned himself with Buchalter after his split from Orgen.

In 1927, upon taking control of the International Brotherhood of Painters Flatbush-based Local 102 from Jacob "The Bum" Wellner in Brooklyn, he clashed with Arnold Rothstein, who had been hired by an employers association under the "John T. Nolan Agency", headed by Orgen and Rothstein bodyguards Eddie and Jack "Legs" Diamond to break up union activities after workers went on strike.

A protégé of Buchalter, he is suspected to have been with Buchalter and Jacob "Gurrah" Shapiro when Orgen was gunned down in a drive-by shooting on October 15, 1927.

On November 19, he and associate Benjamin Weinstein were both injured in a drive-by shooting while standing at the corner of Mount Eden and Townsend Avenues. Assigned a police guard of fifteen detectives, he was eventually moved from Fordham Hospital to Morrisania Court for his arraignment for technical assault, which was later dismissed. However he would be detained on a bench warrant regarding a charge of robbery.

An associate of Meyer Lansky, he attended the Franconia Hotel Conference on November 11, 1931. One of his men, Louis Cohen, was killed in 1939 by Murder, Inc. after serving a 15-year prison sentence for the murder of "Kid Dropper" Nathan Kaplan.

He would eventually become involved in Buchalter's drug trafficking operations, with shipments reportedly worth $10 million, bringing heroin and morphine into the United States from China with Jacob "Yasha" Katzenberg. His body was later found dumped in the East River; he had been stabbed to death by Murder, Inc. on orders from Buchalter, who suspected Holtz had been skimming from the narcotics operation.
