= Ukrainian mafia =

Umbrella term for Ukrainian organized crime groups

- Founded: Early 1990s
- Founding location: Ukraine
- Territory: Active in many parts of Eastern Europe, in the former Soviet Union, Western Europe, United States (mostly Brighton Beach and Miami) and Israel.
- Ethnicity: Predominantly Ukrainian Jews and Ukrainians
- Criminal activities: Racketeering, drug trafficking, entryism, extortion, loan sharking, murder, human trafficking, sex trafficking, construction management, money laundering, robbery, bootlegging, arms trafficking, gambling, bribery, fencing, prostitution, theft, skimming, pornography and fraud
- Allies: Russian mafia Camorra 'Ndrangheta; Bulgarian mafia American Mafia; Armenian Power; Triads; Serbian mafia Romanian mafia Israeli mafia Sicilian Mafia

The Ukrainian mafia (Ukrainian: Українська мафія) is a collective of various organized crime related elements originating in Ukraine. Such organizations are regarded as one of the most influential types of organized crime coming out of the former USSR, including also the Russian mafia, the Georgian mafia, the Chechen mafia, the Armenian mafia and the Azerbaijani mafia. Ukrainian criminal organizations are involved in a significant number of illegal activities. Although Ukrainian criminal organizations are for the most part independently operating enterprises, they are sometimes connected with Russian mafia organizations, such as the case with Semyon Mogilevich.

== History ==
Following the collapse of the former Soviet Union, there were large stockpiles of arms left in Ukraine. The rise of the Ukrainian mafia came from their participation in the illicit international arms trafficking. Between 1992 and 1998, some $32 billion in military material disappeared from military depots in Ukraine and ended up primarily in West Africa and Central Asia. At the time Ukrainian criminal organizations were also alleged to have trafficked weapons to war-torn places such as Afghanistan.

From trafficking in arms, Ukrainian crime syndicates entered into the international trade in illegal drugs, becoming a major player in the narcotics traffic from Central Asia to Central Europe. The reach of the Ukrainian criminal organizations has been reported from Central European countries such as the Czech Republic and Hungary, where they're involved in prostitution, to North American countries and Israel, where they found a significant power base following the mass immigration of Ukrainian Jews, most of whom were law-abiding citizens, but also included criminal elements intent on profiting illegally from the open borders.

In the 2000s, the Ukrainian mafia cooperated with the Neapolitan Camorra in the cigarette smuggling business. The Ukrainians would smuggle the cigarettes from Ukraine and Eastern Europe into Italy, where with the help of the Camorra it supplied the Neapolitan market. In recent years, the Camorra Contini clan is said to have cooperated in the same scheme with the Ukrainians.

== Regional crime groups ==
=== Kyiv mafia ===
According to the Directorate on Fight against Organized Crime, during the mid-1990s around 6,000 people participated in activities of organized crime groups in Kyiv. Most of them were engaged in racketeering and illegal operations with foreign currency. Many criminals of that period were killed in gang wars, while a number of those who survived would rise to become notable businessmen and politicians.

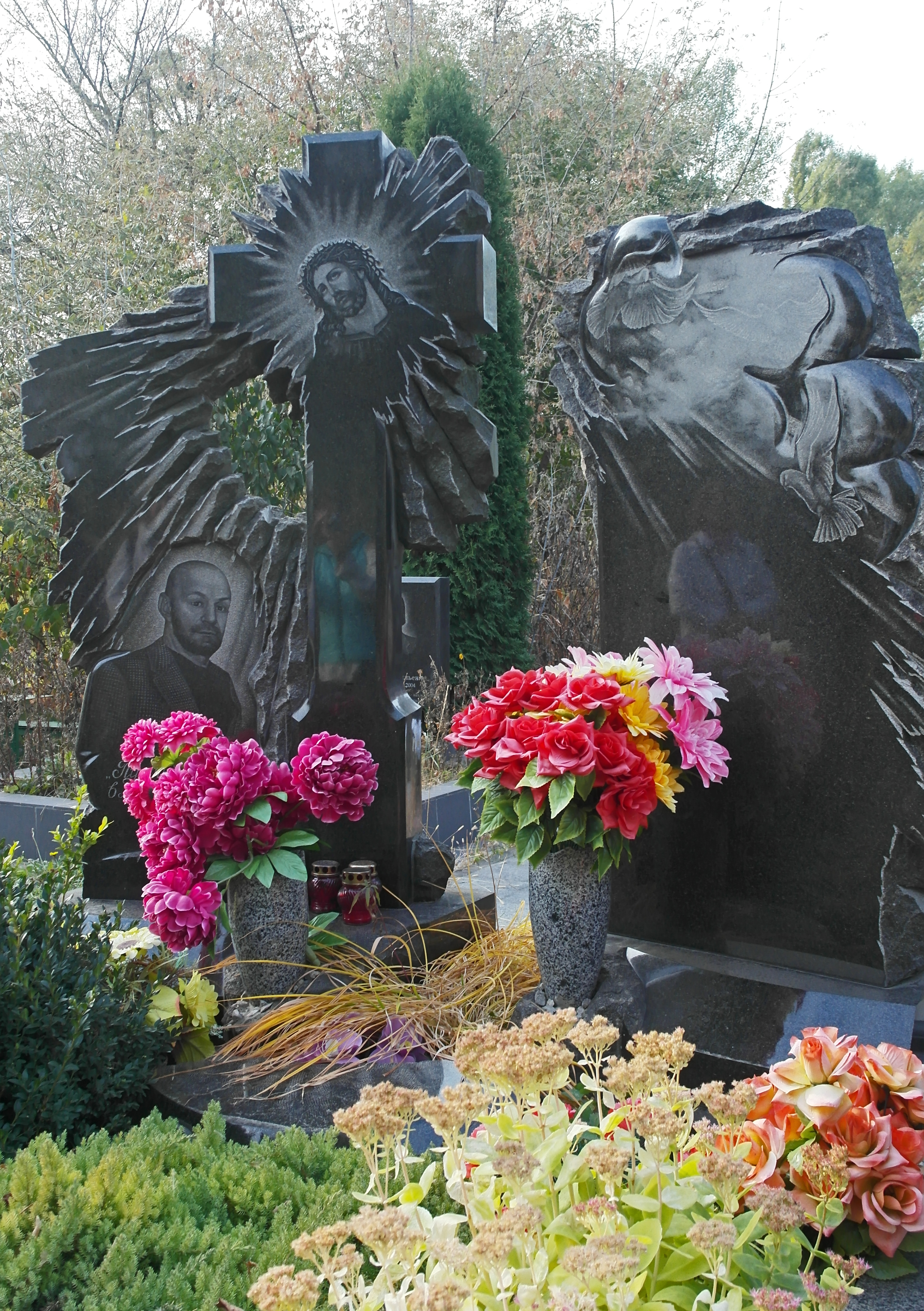
Grave of Viktor "Rybka" Rybalko in Kyiv

A notable crime leader of the Ukrainian capital during that time was Viktor "Rybka" Rybalko (1950–2005), a native of Baku, who represented the old generation of "blatnoy" gangsters which had emerged during the Soviet period. Rybalko's group controlled several popular restaurants, sport clubs and a funeral home in Kyiv, and was reported to have partnership relations with Ihor Bakai, then head of the Naftogaz of Ukraine. It was also claimed, that Rybalko supported the careers of Klitschko brothers, and attempted to use Ukrainian mafia's influence in the United States to provide them a contract with Don King. During his later years Rybalko was active on the real estate market in Amsterdam. He was fatally shot in a contract killing, which took place on 12 May 2005 in Kyiv's Ivan Franko Street and was possibly organized by his former partner Bakai, who had by that time fled to Russia in order to escape possible prosecution following the Orange Revolution.

Another major crime group in Kyiv was headed by Boris Savlokhov (1952–2004), popularly known as "Solokha", a native of North Ossetia, who moved to Kyiv in order to train as a wrestler under the management of Vladimir Sinyavsky. Along with his criminal group, many of whose members were fellow sportsmen from Ossetia, Savlokhov established control over several casinos and markets, and also invested in show business, organizing beauty pageants and variety shows, whose participants frequently engaged in prostitution. Savlokhov received personal protection of Georgian singer Vakhtang Kikabidze, and was awarded by president Leonid Kuchma for his philanthropic activities. After surviving several arrests and an assassination attempt, in 2000 Savlokhov was sentenced to 9,5 years of imprisonment for hooliganism and extortion, but that term was eventually reduced to 5,5 years by the Supreme Court; his verdict was protested by parliamentarians from the Communist Party of Ukraine. On 24 April 2004 Savlokhov died in prison, officially from a heart attack.

A notable case in the criminal history of Kyiv was the assassination of the local gangster Valeriy "Pryshch" Pryshchyk (1960-2003), who controlled a major market in Troieshchyna neighbourhood. Despite having more than 10 cases opened against him, Pryshchyk evaded imprisonment due to corruption, but on 1 December 2003 a hitman murdered him in the court of a hospital owned by the Ministry of Defence. The mastermind behind the assasination could never be discovered, but it was theorized that it could have been performed in revenge for a previous attempt on the life of Volodymyr Kysil, another notable criminal figure in Kyiv.

Volodymyr Kysil (1946–2009), known as "Did" ("Grandpa"), was a professional wrestler, who graduated from the Kyiv Institute of Physical Culture and joined the criminal hierarchy after being imprisoned for robbery in 1981. During the 1990s, Kysil's gang engaged in robbery, assault, extortion, smuggling, racket and illegal finacial operations. In order to diversify his activities, he invested in metal industry, air travel, real estate and gambling, got elected to the Moscow District council of Kyiv and served as a member of Ukraine's National Olympic Committee. Kysil acted as a patron for numerous businessmen, and was known for his tolerant attitude to subordinates. He was also a benefactor of the Ukrainian Orthodox Church - Moscow Patriarchate. After surviving an assassination attempt in November 2003, Kysil died in May 2009 as a result of a traffic accident near Koziatyn, and was buried in a Kyiv monastery reconstructed with his donations.

A significant figure involved in criminal connections between Kyiv and Central Europe was Ihor Tkachenko (1964–2001), nicknamed "Cherep" ("Skull"). A native of Kazakhstan, he moved to Ukraine and became a professional basketball player, before organizing a gang of fellow sportsmen. Tkachenko estalished a human traffic scheme, transporting Ukrainian girls to Budapest and other Central European cities, where they were forced to engage in prostitution. His gang controlled numerous restaurants and entertainment venues in Kyiv, but despite several arrests Tkachenko managed to evade long terms of imprisonment by employing his connections in the prosecutor's office. In 1999 he was appointed manager of Ukraine women's national basketball team, remaining on that post for two years. On 8 December 2001 Tkachenko was shot dead near his house in Kyiv. After his death, phone numbers of numerous politicians and government officials were discovered by investigators in his notebook.

=== Odesa mafia ===
The most infamous and well known form of Ukrainian organized crime is the so-called Odesa mafia named after the Black Sea port city of Odesa. Odesa is an infamous smugglers' haven and a key hub in post-Soviet global trafficking networks, not the least of which is moving Europe-bound Afghan heroin arriving from the Caucasus. Even in Ukraine's west, gangs are often closely involved in the lucrative trafficking of heroin, people, and counterfeit cigarettes into Europe, sometimes in cooperation with Russian mafia gangs.

Odesa traditionally had an ancient culture of banditry, dating back to the large and impoverished Jewish population. Famous writers such as Isaac Babel often wrote about the infamous exploits of Jewish gangsters, thieves and crime lords in the port city. 20th century thuggery made way for sophisticated organized crime when local crime lords began to use the city's sprawling port to their advantage. The at first locally active Odesa mafia, sometimes also called the Malina, became well known when it first branched out to New York City and later to Israel, when both countries gave the opportunity for Soviet Jews to emigrate. Many people from Odesa's Jewish population migrated abroad, among them a significant number of the city's most infamous career criminals. Although the gang was born in the city of Odesa, it has since established most of its headquarters in cities such as New York City, Miami, Tel Aviv, Antwerp and Budapest with brigades composed of former Odesan or Odesa-connected criminals active in a large number of other cities.

In the 1990s a powerful gang led by Alexander Angert, known as the Don of Odesa, Gennadiy Trukhanov, now the current mayor of Odesa, and Nickolay Fomichev established a large drug and arms trafficking scheme, after they made money in the oil industry. The gang branched out into Europe, using Italy as a base of their operations. According to the authorities, the notorious arms dealer Leonid Minin was also involved in the scheme.

In the United States the Odesa mafia is based in the Brighton Beach district of Brooklyn, New York. It is regarded as the most powerful post-Soviet criminal organization in the United States and has since expanded its operations to Miami, Los Angeles and the San Francisco Bay area, where it has established connections with local Armenian and Israeli crime figures. It's known for being a very secretive organization and is involved in protection rackets, loan-sharking, murder-for-hire, narcotics trafficking, as well as the infamous fuel tax fraud rackets. Nonetheless a large amount of Odesa mafia-connected gangsters have become part of the US' criminal folklore, examples being Marat Balagula, Evsei Agron and Boris Nayfeld. Feuds, often resulting in extreme violence, happened in the 1980s and 1990s between Odesa gangsters such as the internal war between Balagula and Agron at first, and later on between the Nayfeld brothers and Monya Elson.

In summer 2010 the Security Service of Ukraine discovered two loads of Bolivian cocaine with a combined weight of more than 700 kilograms and estimated to cost over 61 million USD on a Chilean ship docked in the Port of Odesa. According to the investigators, the cocaine was planned for transportation into the European Union through Moldova.

== In popular culture ==
- The Odesa Mob, or Odesa crime family, first appeared in Detective Comics edition #742 in March 2000 and has since featured in numerous Batman titles.
- The 2000 film Brother 2 features the Ukrainian Mafia in Chicago.
- The 2003 film The Italian Job features the character Mashkov (played by Olek Krupa), a high-ranking member of a Los Angeles Ukrainian mafia family.
- The 2005 film Lord of War tells the story of Ukrainian-American arms trafficker Yuri Orlov (played by Nicolas Cage, and based on Viktor Bout).
- A Ukrainian mafia family called the Zakarov Syndicate, which started out running sweatshops before moving into the crack cocaine trade in Chicago and gaining a foothold in Hong Kong, feature as antagonists in the 2007 video game Stranglehold.
- The Whisper Gang, a Ukrainian mob group operating in Gotham City and led by Luka Volk, made its first appearance in the Batman comics in January 2012 and later featured in the Gotham TV series' third season (2016).
- The Miami branch of a Kyiv-based crime syndicate called the Koshka Brotherhood, specializing in heroin and human trafficking, feature as the main antagonists in the seventh season of the television series Dexter (2012).
- In the TV series Banshee, they were the main antagonist for the first two seasons. They were led by a crime boss named Rabbit who got the main protagonist Lucas Hood arrested for a jewel heist and had people torture him in prison since he and his daughter Anna tried to steal from him. When Lucas got out of prison, he sent his thugs after him to kill him as well as track down his daughter. After the final shootout with the Ukrainian mob, Rabbit shot himself which ended season 2.

== See also ==
- Semyon Mogilevich
- Marat Balagula
- Evsei Agron
- Boris Nayfeld
- Mishka Yaponchik
- Akhat Bragin
- Ukrainian oligarchs
- Corruption in Ukraine
- Human trafficking in Ukraine
