= Boris Nayfeld =

Russian-American gangster

- Born: Boris Mikhailovich Nayfeld; October 4, 1947 (age 79); Gomel, Byelorussian SSR, Soviet Union (now Belarus)
- Other name: "Biba"
- Occupations: Mob Boss, Mobster, Drug Trafficker, Racketeer, Robber, Extortionist, Arsonist
- Spouses: Valentina "Valya" (divorced) Angela Kiperman (divorced)
- Children: 3
- Parent: Mikhail Nayfeld (Father) Ekaterina "Katya" Petrovna (Mother)
- Relatives: Gennady Mikhailovich Nayfeld (brother)
- Allegiance: Russian Mafia

Boris Mikhailovich Nayfeld (Russian: Борис Михайлович Найфельд, Belarusian: Барыс Міхайлавіч Нейфелд) also known as Biba (Russian: Биба, Belarusian: Біба) is a former Belarusian/Russian mob boss and heroin trafficker, who operated out of Brighton Beach, New York City.

== Early life ==
Boris Mikhailovich Nayfeld was born in Gomel on October 4, 1947, to Mikhail and Ekaterina Nayfeld. His father was Jewish while his mother was Russian Orthodox. He and his older brother, Gennady, were raised in a Jewish household by their paternal grandparents, Yosef and Riva after Nayfeld's father was jailed in a gulag and his mother subsequently abandoned the family. Although he excelled in athletics: wrestling, and rowing, Nayfeld was more attracted to street life. At 18, he was arrested on the charge of khuligan and was jailed for three years in a penal colony in Babruysk. When released, he got out of conscripted service by feigning psychopathy. Nayfeld made his money in the black market through a series of no-show jobs and embezzling from the state before immigrating to America with his family. They initially went through Belgium and then Italy before arriving in America.

== Arrival in America and rise to power ==
Boris Nayfeld arrived in JFK Airport on December 7, 1979 as a Soviet Jewish refugee under the Jackson-Vanik Amendment. He and his family lived in Albany for a couple of months before settling in Brighton Beach. He worked as a taxicab driver briefly before returning to crime. He became a small-time criminal and was arrested in Nassau County for grand larceny, pleaded guilty to petty larceny, and was placed on probation for a year. He then led his own gang where they dealt in jewel theft, armed robbery, and arson. He later became a bodyguard and chauffeur to Brighton Beach mob boss Evsei Agron. He was soon one of Agron's most trusted men and became his second-in-command. After a 1984 assassination attempt on Agron's life, Nayfeld took over much of the operation.

In 1985, Evsei Agron was murdered, shot in the back of the head while waiting for the elevator in his apartment. Suspected of killing his former boss, Nayfeld was interrogated and took a lie detector test, but was later released. Nayfeld continues to deny any involvement with Agron's murder. After this, Nayfeld became lead enforcer for Ukrainian mob boss Marat Balagula, whom he had met after first arrived in America and had done some arson jobs for him. He had also acted as a buffer between Agron and Balagula. With Balagula acting as the brains and Nayfeld acting as the brawn, Balagula ruled the neighborhood rackets before being convicted of credit card fraud and gasoline bootlegging in 1989 and 1992 respectively and was sentenced to 18 years in prison. In the aftermath, Nayfeld took over the remnants of Balagula's organization and began to branch out on his own. In 1986, Nayfeld was the target of an assassination attempt in which two gunman charged into his Sheepshead Bay office, firing 38 shots that left his associate and friend, Ilya "Zelya" Zeltzer, dead and Nayfeld with an injured hand. Michael "Misha" Vax and Vladimir Reznikov, two Soviet émigré gangsters were alleged to be the assassins. Reznikov was murdered a couple months later by the Gemini twins, on the orders of Anthony Casso.

== Heroin ring and boss of Brighton ==
Nayfeld's initial entry into drug trafficking was smuggling kilos of cocaine from Brooklyn into West Germany. However, he soon realized he couldn't compete with the more established European organizations. Together with Italo–Polish gangster Ricardo Fanchini, Nayfeld ran a successful heroin-smuggling operation that transported China White from Thailand to the United States. After being smuggled into Singapore, the drug was hidden in television picture tubes and shipped to Warsaw via a Belgium-based import-export company. From there, couriers flew it via plane to Brighton Beach. Upon arrival the heroin was sold partly to the Five Families and partly to Latino street gangs. They only ever smuggled drugs during the winter, as the bulky clothing would hide the drugs. They were able to smuggle the drugs out of Poland as Poland wasn't on the DEA's radar. Things were going well for Nayfeld, and he spent his time in either a luxury apartment in Antwerp with his mistress and son or in his family home in Egbertville, Staten Island with his wife and their two children opposite a nature reserve.

With all the money he was making with his heroin-smuggling ring, and his previous partners either dead or in jail, Nayfeld emerged as the new Russian crime boss of Brighton Beach.

== Gangland war and arrests ==
With Nayfeld acting as the new boss of Brighton Beach, other gangsters were constantly vying to take him out. In 1991, Nayfeld survived his second assassination attempt when a car bomb failed to go off. Monya Elson, a Moldovan gangster from Kishinev, in association with Efim Laskin, a Ukrainian gangster from Lviv who was based in Berlin, were behind the plot in a bid to take out Nayfeld and take over his heroin operation in Brooklyn and rackets in Europe. This would only be the beginning of the Russian mafia war in Brooklyn. After a series of tit for tat attacks in which Elson assassinated several of Nayfeld's associates, Nayfeld got even when on September 27, 1991, Laskin was found murdered in Munich. Nayfeld's associate, Aleksander Timoshenko, a gangster from Gomel, was found guilty and sentenced to life. In a retrial, he was sentenced to 13 years and released on parole in 2006. He was murdered in Moscow in 2014.

In January 1994, he was arrested by federal agents for drug trafficking. Nayfeld agreed to testify against Elson but refused to speak out against any of his inner circle. However, this has been disputed, as legal experts have questioned how Nayfeld could get such a deal by testifying against one person. However, Nayfeld never had to testify against Monya Elson, as Elson had made his own deal with the feds. Nayfeld was sentenced to time served, which was four years and four months and had to do five years of probation.

In 2007, Nayfeld was arrested again on charges of cocaine trafficking and money laundering. Later, he and his co-defendants, the Dozortsev brothers, Nikolai and Arthur, pleaded guilty to laundering the drug money which belonged to themselves and Ricardo Fanchini. Nayfeld was sentenced to five years in prison, where he served his time at FCI Englewood, and where he became friendly with former governor of Illinois Rod Blagojevich. He was released in 2014.

In 2016, Nayfeld was arrested for extorting a victim for $125,000, who Nayfeld was initially hired to kill. He pled guilty to one count of conspiracy to commit extortion, and after cooperating with prosecutors, was sentenced to 23 months incarcerated, 18 which he served during him awaiting trial, and three years of probation.

== Personal life and pop culture ==
Today, Nayfeld lives in Moscow living off a monthly $750 Social Security check.

Nayfeld is twice divorced and has three kids. He has two children, Alesya and Valentin, with his first wife, and another child, Ilyusha, with his second wife.

Nayfeld, along with his wife Angela and son Eli, was featured on season 2 of Families of the Mafia.
