= Potato Bag Gang =

Ukrainian-American crime syndicate

- Years active: mid-1970s
- Territory: New York City
- Ethnicity: Ukrainian Jews, Russian Jews
- Activities: scam, fraud, theft

The Potato Bag Gang, a manifestation of the Odessa mafia, was a gang of con artists from Odessa that operated in New York City's Soviet émigré community in the Brighton Beach area of New York City in the mid-1970s.

== Criminal activity ==
Posing as merchant sailors, they would offer to sell victims bags full of antique gold rubles for thousands of dollars each. In reality, only the sample coin was authentic, and the bags were full of potatoes.

== See also ==
- Ukrainian mafia
- Russian mafia
