= Evsei Agron =

Russian-American gangster

- Agron in the early 1980s
- Born: Yevsei Borisovich Agron; 25 January 1932; Leningrad, Russian SFSR, Soviet Union (now Saint Petersburg, Russia)
- Died: 4 May 1985 (aged 53); New York City, New York, U.S.
- Cause of death: Murder
- Occupation: Crime boss
- Spouses: Valentina (divorced) Maya Rozova (until death)
- Children: 1
- Parent: Boris Agron
- Allegiance: Russian mafia

Evsei Borisovich Agron (/(j)ɪvˈseɪ ˈæɡrɒn/; Russian: Евсей Борисович Агрон; 25 January 1932 – 4 May 1985) was a Soviet-American mobster and boss of New York City's Russian mafia during the 1970s and 1980s. Known for his cruelty, he was called the "Godfather" of the Russian American mafia.

== Criminal career ==
Born in Leningrad, of Jewish origins, Agron was a pickpocket. He served seven years in a Soviet prison camp and emerged as a vor. Agron was expelled from the vor brotherhood, however, for failure to pay a gambling debt. He left the Soviet Union in 1971 and controlled a large prostitution and gambling ring in Hamburg, West Germany.

Agron emigrated to the United States, arriving at John F. Kennedy International Airport in New York City on October 8, 1975 and listing his occupation as a jeweler. The investigative journalist Robert I. Friedman described Agron as a "short, grandfatherly man". He swiftly gained control of criminal operations among the Soviet Jews living in the Brighton Beach neighborhood of Brooklyn, and with the assistance of his enforcers Emile Puzyretsky and the Nayfeld brothers, Benjamin and Boris, oversaw a lucrative extortion ring in the Russian émigré community, which by 1980 was worth tens of thousands of dollars per week. The victims of Agron's protection racket included doctors, lawyers and shopkeepers who "were scared shitless" of Agron, according to Federal Bureau of Investigation (FBI) agent William Moschella. Agron often carried a cattle prod, which he used to torture victims.

As boss of the most powerful Russian crime group in New York, Agron oversaw a gang which operated in at least six North American cities and branched out into truck hijacking, jewelry heists and Medicaid fraud. Agron also purchased a Russian-language newspaper in Brighton Beach, which was later burned down in an apparent arson. Through Murray Wilson, a Jewish associate of the Genovese crime family, Agron began a close alliance with the Genovese family. Many of Agron's operations were headquartered out of the El Caribe club, which was part-owned by Trump lawyer Michael Cohen. Another important ally of Agron was Ronald Greenwald, a politically connected rabbi who allegedly helped Agron obtain a U.S. visa and often hosted meetings with Agron in the office of his commodities firm in Lower Manhattan.

In 1980, Agron was shot while walking on the Coney Island Boardwalk and lost part of his lower intestine. While recovering at Coney Island Hospital, Agron was questioned by a police officer and asked if he knew the identity of the man who had shot him. He answered that he indeed did know, but refused to name the shooter and insisted that he would "take care of it [himself]". There have been various theories regarding the reason behind the shooting, including an unpaid gambling debt, and an attempt to overthrow Agron by a member of his own gang.

Through his powerful Mafia and political connections, Agron ascended blue-collar crime rackets and expanded into white-collar crime. In 1983, federal agents uncovered a multi-million dollar fraud perpetrated jointly by Agron and Wilson relating to the skimming of profits from the Dunes hotel and casino in Las Vegas, which was owned by Morris Shenker. Shenker arranged for Agron and a dozen of his underlings to visit the Dunes on all-expense-paid trips, during which the Russian mafiosi were each given lines of credit of up to $50,000. Rather than gamble the money, however, they instead turned their chips over to Wilson, who later cashed the chips in. With the markers never repaid, the Russians helped defraud the Dunes of more than $1 million over a period of several months.

Agron also organized a motor fuel racket which would earn millions, if not billions, through fuel tax fraud. This type of fraud, which involved selling tax-free home heating oil as diesel fuel, eventually cost the state of New Jersey alone an estimated $1 billion annually in lost tax revenues. Other mobsters closed in on the fuel racket, and a rival organization began expanding its own criminal operations under Boris Goldberg, who, in 1989, would be charged under the Racketeer Influenced and Corrupt Organizations Act (RICO) for drug trafficking, armed robbery, extortion, arms dealing and attempted murder.

In January 1984, Agron survived a second assassination attempt when he was shot twice in the face and neck as he ascended a gentle slope from the garage in the basement of his home on 100 Ocean Parkway in Brooklyn. He was operated on at Coney Island Hospital by Dr. Larissa Blinkin, who was unable to remove the bullets lodged in Agron's body but did save his life. Agron was left paralyzed on one side of his face. The shooting was planned by the Goldberg gang. Agron again refused to identify his assailant.

Agron died after being shot twice in the head outside his Brooklyn apartment in May 1985, at the age of 53. He was succeeded by Marat Balagula as leader of the Russian mob in the United States. In 2018, Heather Digby Parton wrote in Salon that "[Balagula] was suspected of killing Agron".

== Personal life ==
Evsei Agron was married and had met his wife in the early 1950s during his youth. After emigrating in 1982, Agron began a relationship with his civil partner, former Soviet singer Maya Rozova (Rosenweiss). In 1984, Rozova gave birth to their son Gregory, who later served in the US Army in the Iraq War, was wounded, and awarded the Purple Heart. After demobilization, Gregory received a law degree and lived in the state of California.

Evsei Agron's life story was the subject of the book Red Mafiya: How the Russian Mob Has Invaded America, written by American journalist Robert I. Friedman. Following Agron's death, Rozova disputed many of the claims made in the book about Agron's criminal activities.
