= Marat Balagula =

Russian-American mobster

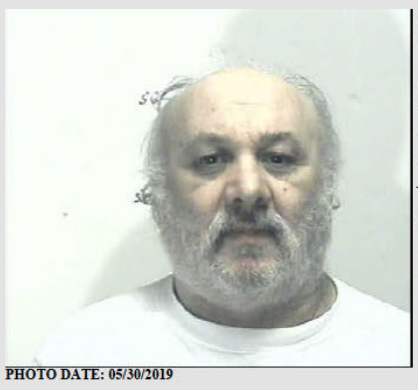
- Born: 8 September 1943; Chkalov, USSR (now Orenburg, Russia)
- Died: 19 December 2019 (aged 76); New York City, U.S.
- Other name: The Russian
- Occupation: Mobster
- Spouse: Alexandra Balagula
- Parent(s): Yakov Balagula (father), Zinaida Balagula (mother)
- Status: Released in 2004
- Allegiance: American Mafia; Lucchese crime family Colombo crime family
- Convictions: 10 years in federal prison
- Criminal charges: Tax evasion (26 U.S.C. § 7201) via bootleg gasoline

Marat Yakovlevich Balagula (/məˈræt ˌbɑːləˈɡuːlə/; Russian: Марат Яковлевич Балагула; 8 September 1943 – 19 December 2019) was a Russian-American organized crime figure, crime boss, and close associate of the Lucchese crime family and Colombo crime family.

== Biography ==
=== Early life ===
Marat Balagula was born to Soviet Jewish parents in 1943 in the Russian city of Orenburg at the height of World War II. ("Balagula" is Yiddish for "wagon driver," from the Hebrew בעל עגלה.) His mother, Zinaida, had fled with the children from their home in Odesa, Ukraine after the German invasion of the USSR. At the time of his birth, Marat's father, Yakov Balagula, was on active service as a lieutenant in the Red Army.

As a young adult, Balagula obtained two advanced university degrees: one in mathematics and another in economics. For many years, Balagula also worked as a crew member of the Soviet cruise ship MS Ivan Franko, which he used as an opportunity to buy scarce Western consumer goods during his trips abroad and then sell them on the black market after returning to the USSR.

=== Start in the United States ===
After years of allegedly running a black market food source with the collusion of corrupt Party officials in Odesa, Balagula decided to move his family to the United States in 1977. At first he worked as a textile cutter in Washington Heights for $3.50 per hour. His wife Alexandra later remembered, "It was hard for us, with no language, no money."

=== Russian mob ===
Balagula moved his family to Brighton Beach, where he opened a restaurant, which he later sold in order to buy a chain of fourteen gas stations. In 1980, Balagula purchased the Odesa restaurant, night club, and cabaret on Brighton Beach Avenue. The Odesa became so popular as a neighborhood locality, that film director Paul Mazursky wished to shoot a scene there with Robin Williams for the movie Moscow on the Hudson. Balagula declined the offer, as he was afraid of drawing unwanted attention to the club.

With the assistance of Leningrad-born neighborhood crime boss and former Thief in law Evsei Agron, Balagula expanded his operation while creating a series of "burn companies" to confuse the Internal Revenue Service and evade both State and Federal gasoline taxes. In time, Agron and Balagula were selling $150 million worth of fuel every month while pocketing an additional $30-$40 million in unpaid income tax. When the IRS went looking for their share, they found that all of the addresses to Agron and Balagula's fuel companies led either to telephone booths or vacant lots.

In the aftermath of Agron's murder on May 4, 1985, Balagula took over as the most powerful Russian gangster in Brooklyn. Balagula's main enforcer was Boris Nayfeld, a Belarusian Jewish gangster who had arrived in America in 1978 and who was suspected by the NYPD of involvement in Agron's murder.

According to Vladimir Kozlovsky, Balagula's wealth made him a notable figure in Brighton Beach, but whenever residents of the neighborhood were asked about his line of work, they would always say that Balagula was in the gasoline business.

However, according to a former Prosecutor from Suffolk County, New York, "Everybody in Brighton Beach talked about Balagula in hushed tones. These were people who knew him from the Old Country. They were really, genuinely scared of this guy."

=== American Mafia ties ===
After Colombo crime family caporegime Michael Franzese sent soldier Frankie "the Bug" Sciortino to extort protection money from Balagula's underlings in the gasoline business by threatening them with a ball peen hammer, Balagula requested a sitdown with Lucchese crime family consigliere Christopher Furnari at the 19th Hole social club in Bensonhurst. According to former Lucchese underboss Anthony "Gaspipe" Casso, who was present at the meeting, Furnari declared,

Here there's enough for everybody to be happy...to leave the table satisfied. What we must avoid is trouble between us and the other families. I propose to make a deal with the others so there's no bad blood...Meanwhile, we will send word out that from now on you and your people are with the Lucchese family. No one will bother you. If anyone does bother you, come to us and Anthony will take care of it.

In an interview with Robert I. Friedman, a Genovese crime family member recalled with a laugh, "The next time I saw Michael [Franzese] and mentioned Marat, his face went white. Christie Tick had put out the word that Marat was under his protection."

In the aftermath, New York's Five Families imposed a two cent per gallon "Family tax" on Balagula's bootlegging operation, which became their greatest moneymaker after drug trafficking.

According to author Philip Carlo, "Because Gaspipe and Russian mobster Marat Balagula hit it off so well, Casso was soon partners with Balagula on a diamond mine located in Sierra Leone. They opened a business office in Freetown."

According to Jeffrey Robinson, there was so much money coming in from the gas tax scam that it was too big for anyone to control and everyone involved was stealing money from each other. Meanwhile, among many other things, Balagula owned a New York mansion decorated in pink marble and a private island off the African coast.

According to one former associate, "The LCN reminded Marat of the apparatchiks in the Soviet Union. He thought as long as he gave them something they would be valuable allies. Then all of a sudden he was at risk of being killed if he couldn't pay to the penny."

At the same time, Balagula's underboss, Boris Nayfeld, was asked by a member of the Gambino crime family if he could obtain heroin. In response, Balagula and Nayfeld set up an international smuggling operation. China White heroin was purchased in Thailand, sealed inside television sets, and then smuggled to Poland. The drugs were then couriered to New York City and sold to the Five Families. As Poland was not an expected source for drug trafficking into the United States, it took a very long time before the DEA and U.S. Customs became wise to the route.

Balagula also ran an arms trafficking ring that purchased automatic weapons in Florida, transported them to New York City, and them shipped them to the USSR for sale on the black market.

=== Enemies ===
Balagula's deal with the Five Families was seen as a sign of weakness by his rival, a fellow Soviet Jewish gangster named Vladimir Reznikov. According to journalist Vladimir Kozlovsky, Reznikov was a former resident of Kyiv and is still believed in Brighton Beach to have been responsible for both the 1983 murder of mobbed up Soviet dissident intellectual Yuri Brokhin and the 1985 murder of neighborhood crime boss Evsei Agron.

As a means of sending a message, Reznikov drove up to Balagula's offices in Midwood, Brooklyn. Sitting in his car, Reznikov opened fire on the office building with an AK-47 assault rifle. One of Balagula's close associates was killed and several secretaries were wounded.

Then, on June 12, 1986, Reznikov entered the Odesa nightclub in Brighton Beach. Reznikov pushed a 9mm Beretta into Balagula's skull and demanded $600,000 as the price of not pulling the trigger. He also demanded a percentage of everything Balagula was involved in. Even though Balagula immediately agreed, Reznikov allegedly threatened to kill Balagula and his whole family if the latter ever crossed him. Shortly after Reznikov left, Balagula first called Anthony Casso and then suffered a massive heart attack. He insisted, however on being treated at his home, where he felt it would be harder for Reznikov to harm him and his family. When Anthony Casso arrived, he listened to Balagula's story and seethed with fury. Casso later told his biographer Philip Carlo that, to his mind, Reznikov had just spat in the face of the entire Cosa Nostra. Casso responded, "Send word to Vladimir that you have his money, that he should come to the club tomorrow. We'll take care of the rest." Balagula responded, "You're sure? This is an animal. It was him that used a machine gun in the office." Casso responded, "Don't concern yourself. I promise we'll take care of him ... Okay?" Casso then asked, "What kind of car does he drive? Do you have a picture of him?"

The hit was easily okayed and the following day, Reznikov returned to the Rasputin nightclub to pick up his money. Upon realizing that Balagula was not present, Reznikov launched into a barrage of profanity and stormed back to the parking lot. There, Reznikov was shot six times in the arm, leg, and hip by DeMeo crew veteran Joseph Testa. As Reznikov attempted to pull out his own sidearm, Testa finished him off with a seventh bullet in the head. Testa then jumped into a car driven by Anthony Senter and left Brighton Beach. According to Casso, "After that, Marat didn't have any problems with other Russians."

In later interviews with journalist Vladimir Kozlovsky, Balagula admitted that his "associates" killed Reznikov in response to his complaints. Balagula denied having been aware at the time that those "associates" were linked to the American Mafia.

=== Downfall ===
In 1986, Balagula was masterminding a $750,000 credit card scam when a business associate, Robert Fasano, began wearing a wire on him for the U.S. Secret Service. After being convicted on federal charges and after an outraged Alan Dershowitz refused Balagula's demand to bribe the appeals judge, Balagula fled to Antwerp with his longtime mistress Natalia Shevchenko. Balagula then moved to Sierra Leone with mobbed up Israeli businessman and KGB spy Shabtai Kalmanovich. In Freetown, Balagula and Kalmanovich ran a very profitable scheme importing gasoline; in a deal brokered by fugitive businessman Marc Rich and financed by the Lucchese family. Balagula and Kalmanovich then moved to South Africa under Apartheid, where they arranged other deals. In later years, however, Balagula's criminal associates would say that they lost money on every deal they did with Kalmanovich. According to Vladimir Kozlovsky, in his later years, Balagula never had anything nice to say about Kalmanovich either.

In February 1987, U.S. Secret Service Agent Harold Bibb traced the credit card receipts of Balagula's mistress, Natalia Shevchenko, to an apartment in Johannesburg. Bibb also learned that Shevchenko's daughter had enrolled in a local university and that Balagula's underlings in New York City were sending Balagula's driver, a former Soviet Navy officer, to South Africa every month to hand-deliver $50,000 to Balagula in a worn black leather bag.

While Agent Bibb wished to travel to South Africa to make the arrest himself, the Secret Service refused to pay for an airplane ticket. Instead, Agent Bibb contacted the security officer at the United States Embassy in Pretoria, who alerted the Johannesburg police and supplied them with photographs of both the Balagula and of his driver. However, Balagula and Shevchenko escaped arrest and fled to Sierra Leone. In an interview with journalist Robert Friedman, Agent Bibb expressed a belief that South African law enforcement officers took bribes to let Balagula get away.

After three years as a fugitive, on February 27, 1989, Balagula was recognized from an Interpol Red Notice by an agent of the Federal Border Guard and arrested at the airport in Frankfurt am Main, West Germany. After being arrested, Balagula said, "It's very difficult to be a fugitive. I can't see my family. In the last year I started to work in the open. I wanted to get caught." In December 1989, Balagula was extradited to the United States and sentenced to eight years in prison for credit card fraud.

In November 1992, Balagula was convicted at a separate trial for gasoline bootlegging and sentenced to an additional ten years in federal prison. While passing sentence, Judge Leonard Wexler declared, "This was supposed to be a haven for you. It turned out to be a hell for us."

Although the FBI pressured him to become a cooperating witness, Balagula refused, and continued giving orders to his organization while incarcerated in Federal prison. Balagula served his sentence, and was released from imprisonment in 2004.

== Personal life ==
Balagula met his future wife Alexandra at a wedding party in 1965 and married her the following year. As Alexandra disliked her husband's long absences, Balagula left his position aboard the Ivan Franko and instead began running a black market food source with the collusion of corrupt Apparatchiks, one of whom, according to Balagula, was future Soviet Premier Mikhail Gorbachev.

Following his success as a gasoline bootlegger, Balagula moved his wife and children from Brighton Beach to a $1.2 million suburban home in Long Island, from which he commuted to "work" in New York City.

== Death ==
He died from cancer in 2019.

== In popular culture ==
- The 2007 police thriller We Own the Night, which is set in Brighton Beach during the 1980s, is inspired by the efforts by law enforcement to shut down the gigantic heroin smuggling operation masterminded by Marat Balagula and Boris Nayfeld. A character inspired by Balagula is renamed Marat Buzhayev (Moni Moshonov) and a character based on Nayfeld is renamed Vadim Nezhinski (Alex Veadov).
