= Russian Dolls (2011 TV series) =

American reality television series

- Genre: Reality
- Country of origin: United States
- No. of seasons: 1
- No. of episodes: 12

Production
- Executive producers: Alina Dizik; Banks Tarver; Colleen Conway; Edward Simpson; Elina Miller; Gena McCarthy; Ken Druckerman; Rob Sharenow
- Running time: 21 minutes (excluding commercials)
- Production company: Left/Right Films

Original release
- Network: Lifetime
- Release: August 11 – October 7, 2011

Russian Dolls is an American reality television series on Lifetime. The series debuted on August 11, 2011 and finished on October 7, 2011. The series follows the lives of eight Russian-American families living in Brighton Beach, New York.

== Production and Cancellation ==
The show premiered on August 11, 2011 at 10:30/9:30c following hit series Project Runway. The show premiered to low ratings with a 0.4 rating in adults 18–49 demo and only 0.97 million viewers watching the episode. While the series was in pre-production, Lifetime originally chose to name the series 'Brighton Beach but was later changed to its current title. The series was deemed a Jersey Shore-esque reality series even before the title change.

On August 23, 2011, Lifetime moved the series to a later time slot, at 11:30/10:30c following a Dance Moms repeat. On September 21, 2011, Lifetime announced that the series would be burned off and the last five episodes of the series aired on October 7, 2011, as a special marathon event.

== Episodes ==
No.	Title	Original release date	U.S. viewers (millions)
1	"Mama Dearest"	August 11, 2011	0.97
2	"From Ukraine with Love"	August 18, 2011	0.77
3	"Tough Russian Love"	August 25, 2011	N/A
4	"Ruski Business"	September 1, 2011	N/A
5	"Calendar Girls"	September 8, 2011	N/A
6	"New Year, Old Grievances"	September 15, 2011	N/A
7	"Cold Wars"	September 22, 2011	N/A
8	"It Takes DVA To Tango"	October 7, 2011	N/A
9	"Single Russian Female"	October 7, 2011	N/A
10	"Eastern Promises"	October 7, 2011	N/A
11	"Perestroika"	October 7, 2011	N/A
12	"Russian Dolls"	October 7, 2011	N/A

== Reception ==
The New York Press stated that "while Russian Dolls is ultimately a Brooklyn Jersey Shore, its unique focus on and respect for Russian culture and parenthood elevates it above the typical reality show drivel." The Wall Street Journal wrote that "Having the opportunity to mash up something as Russian as Brighton Beach with something as American as reality TV really drives home the fact that there’s a place where KGB-era ways and Kim Kardashian can meet."

The show has been criticized for having Ukrainian women appear as some of its "Russian dolls". The Boston Herald noted that the show "reinforces every negative stereotype about Russian women." Pravda.ru described the show as "a spit in Russia's face." The New York Times remarked that "If the Soviet authorities had wanted to torture Aleksandr Solzhenitsyn beyond endurance, they would have forced him to watch Russian Dolls." AM New York describes the show as "so busily edited ...that there’s no flavor of any kind" adding that "If nothing else, this show might make us more appreciative of all the effort those “Jersey Shore” folks put into their portrayals."
