= Rachel Carson High School for Coastal Studies =

Public school in New York City

Rachel Carson High School For Coastal Studies

Location
- 521 West Ave; Brooklyn, (Kings County), New York 11224; United States
- Coordinates: 40.5822°N 73.9722°W

Information
- School type: Public school (government funded), high school
- School district: New York City Department of Education
- NCES District ID: 3600152
- NCES School ID: 360015205826
- Principal: Stephen McNally (IA)
- Faculty: 26.37 (on an FTE basis)
- Grades: 9–12
- Enrollment: 470 (2010-2011 school year)
  - Grade 9: 125
  - Grade 10: 161
  - Grade 11: 103
  - Grade 12: 81
- Student to teacher ratio: 17.82
- Campus: City: Large

Rachel Carson High School for Coastal Studies is a public high school in Coney Island, Brooklyn, New York City. It is a part of the New York City Department of Education.
