= Brighton Beach =

Neighborhood in New York City

- Neighborhood in Brooklyn
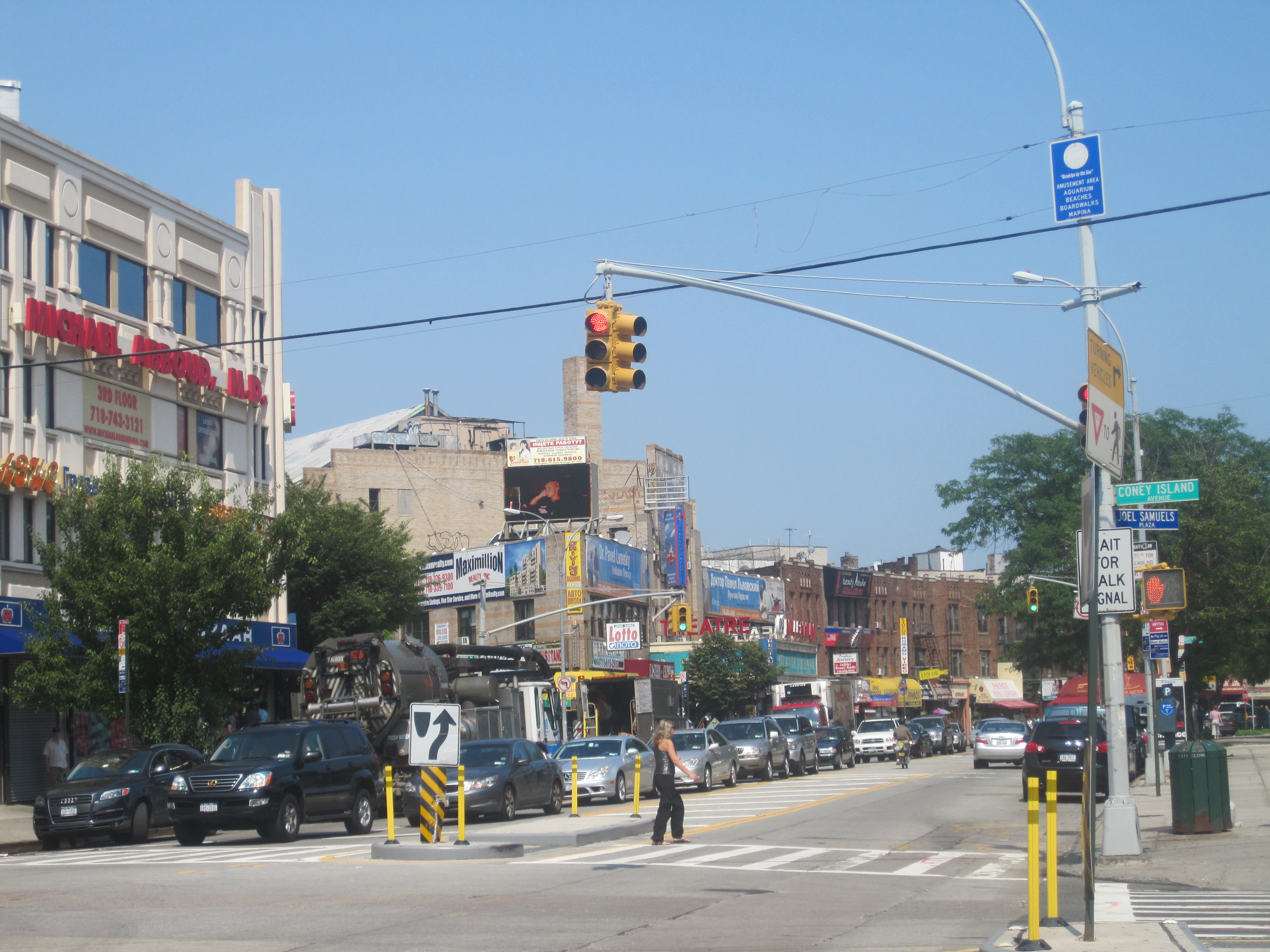
- Looking east along Brighton Beach Avenue from the corner of Coney Island Avenue
- Nickname: "Little Odessa"
- Interactive map of Brighton Beach
- Coordinates: 40.58°N 73.96°W
- Country: United States
- State: New York
- City: New York City
- Borough: Brooklyn
- Community District: Brooklyn 13
- Founded: 1868
- Founder: William A. Engeman

Population (2010)
  - Total: 35,547
- Time zone: UTC– 05:00 (Eastern)
  - Summer (DST): UTC– 04:00 (EDT)
- ZIP Code: 11235
- Area code: 718, 347, 929, and 917

Brighton Beach, (Note: Russian: Брайтон-Бич) also referred to as Little Odessa, (Note: Russian: Маленькая Одесса, romanized: Malenkaya Odessa) or Little Russia, (Note: Russian: Маленькая Россия, romanized: Malenkaya Rossiya) is a neighborhood in the southern portion of the New York City borough of Brooklyn, within the greater Coney Island area along the Atlantic Ocean coastline. Brighton Beach is bounded by Coney Island proper at Ocean Parkway to the west, Manhattan Beach at Corbin Place to the east, Sheepshead Bay at the Belt Parkway to the north, and the Atlantic Ocean to the south along the beach and boardwalk.

It is known for its high population of Russian-speaking immigrants, and as a summer destination for New York City residents due to its beaches along the Atlantic Ocean and its proximity to the amusement parks in Coney Island. It was named in the 1870s as an allusion to the English resort city of Brighton.

Brighton Beach is part of Brooklyn Community District 13, and its primary ZIP Code is 11235. It is patrolled by the 60th Precinct of the New York City Police Department. Politically, Brighton Beach is represented by the New York City Council's 48th District.

== History ==
=== Early development ===
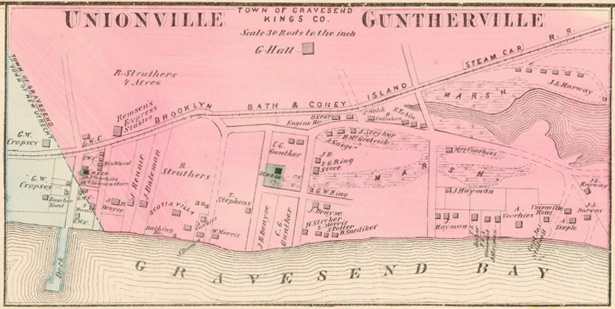
1873 map of Brighton Beach

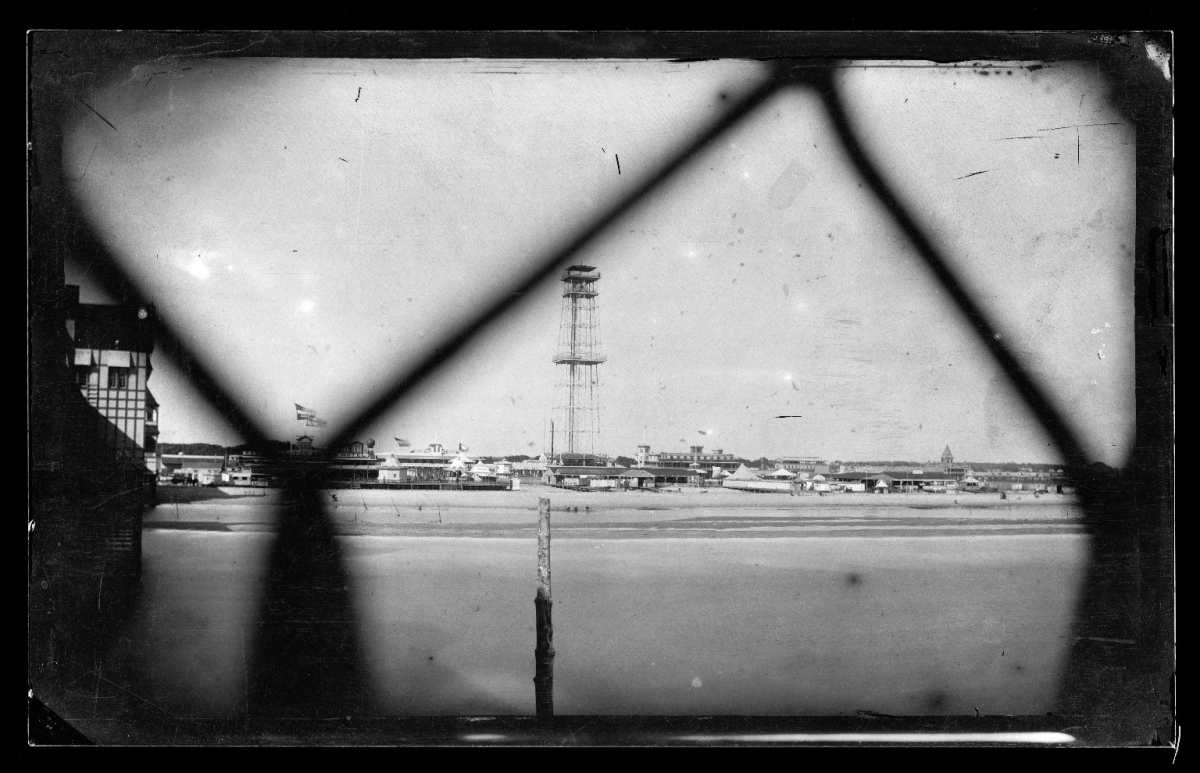
West Brighton, Brooklyn, c. 1872 – c. 1887

Brighton Beach is included in an area from Sheepshead Bay to Sea Gate that was purchased from the Native Americans in 1645 for a gun, a blanket and a kettle.

Brighton Beach was located on sandy terrain, and before development in the 1860s, had mostly farms. The area was part of the "Middle Division" of the town of Gravesend, which was the sole English settlement out of the original six towns in Kings County. By the mid-18th century, thirty-nine lots in the division had been distributed to the descendants of English colonists.

In 1868, William A. Engeman built a resort in the area. The resort was given the name "Brighton Beach" in 1878 by Henry C. Murphy and a group of businessmen, who chose the name as an allusion to the English resort city of Brighton. With the help of Gravesend's surveyor William Stillwell, Engeman acquired all 39 lots for the relatively low cost of $20,000. Mostly patronized by the upper middle class, this 460-by-210-foot (140 by 64 m) hotel close to the then-rundown western Coney Island had rooms for up to 5,000 guests nightly and served meals for up to 20,000 people daily. The 400-foot (120 m), double-decker Brighton Beach Bathing Pavilion was also built nearby and opened in 1878, with the capacity for 1,200 bathers. "Hotel Brighton", also known as the "Brighton Beach Hotel", was situated on the beach at what is now the foot of Coney Island Avenue. The Brooklyn, Flatbush, and Coney Island Railway, the predecessor to the New York City Subway's present-day Brighton Line, opened on July 2, 1878, and provided access to the hotel.

Adjacent to the hotel, Engeman built the Brighton Beach Race Course for thoroughbred horse racing. In December 1887, an extremely high tide washed over the area, creating a new, temporary connection between Sheepshead Bay and the ocean. Wrote the Brooklyn Daily Eagle: "Unless [Engeman] is very lucky the next races on the Brighton Beach track will be conducted by the white crested horses of Neptune."

After that extremely high tide, and a decade of beach erosion, the Brighton Beach Hotel, by then owned by the Railway, faced the possibility of being "undermined and carried away." A "highly ingenious and novel" plan to elevate and move the entire building was begun by railway Superintendent J.L. Morrow and Secretary E.L. Langford. It was accomplished by lifting the entire estimated 5000-ton 460 by 150 feet (140 m × 46 m) hotel on 13 hydraulic jacks, raising the building above its plot, and then laying 24 lines of railroad track – a mile and a half long altogether – under it; then the building temporarily on 112 railroad "platform cars" (flat cars) was pulled by six steam locomotives and relocated another 495 feet inland. This careful engineering (by B.C. Miller) made the move successful; it began on April 2, 1888, and continued for nine days, and was the largest building relocation of the 19th century.

Anton Seidl and the Metropolitan Opera brought their popular interpretations of Wagner to the Brighton Beach Music Hall, where John Philip Sousa was in residence, and the New Brighton Theater was a hotspot for vaudeville. Visitors for tea at Reisenweber's Brighton Beach Casino would be served by Japanese waitresses in full costume. At an enormous private club, the Brighton Beach Baths, members could swim, access a private beach, and play handball, mah-jongg, and cards.

The village, along with the rest of Gravesend, was annexed into the 31st Ward of the City of Brooklyn in 1894.

=== Early 20th century ===
In 1905, Brighton Beach Park opened its own area of amusements, called Brighton Pike. Brighton Pike offered a boardwalk, games, live entertainment (including the Miller Brothers' wild-west show: 101 Ranch), and a huge steel roller coaster. In May 1919, most of the park was burned down, including the roller coaster. The beach remained popular.

Brighton Beach was re-developed as a fairly dense residential community with the final rebuilding of the Brighton Beach railway to rapid transit standards, becoming the Brooklyn–Manhattan Transit Corporation (BMT)'s Brighton Line, which opened as a subway line in August 1920 (the line is now served by the New York City Subway's B and Q services). The subway line within the neighborhood is above ground on an elevated structure. The opening of the BMT Brighton Line had conflicting consequences: although it made Brighton Beach viable as a year-round community, it was now much more feasible for visitors to return home in the evening rather than spend the night. This led to the closure of the Brighton Beach Hotel in 1924.

The years just before and following the Great Depression brought with them a neighborhood consisting mostly of first- and second-generation Jewish-Americans and, later, Holocaust concentration camp survivors. Of the estimated 55,000 Holocaust survivors living in New York City as of 2011, most live in Brighton Beach. To meet the bursting cultural demands, the New Brighton Theater converted itself to the States' first Yiddish theater in 1919.

=== Late 20th century and Soviet immigration ===
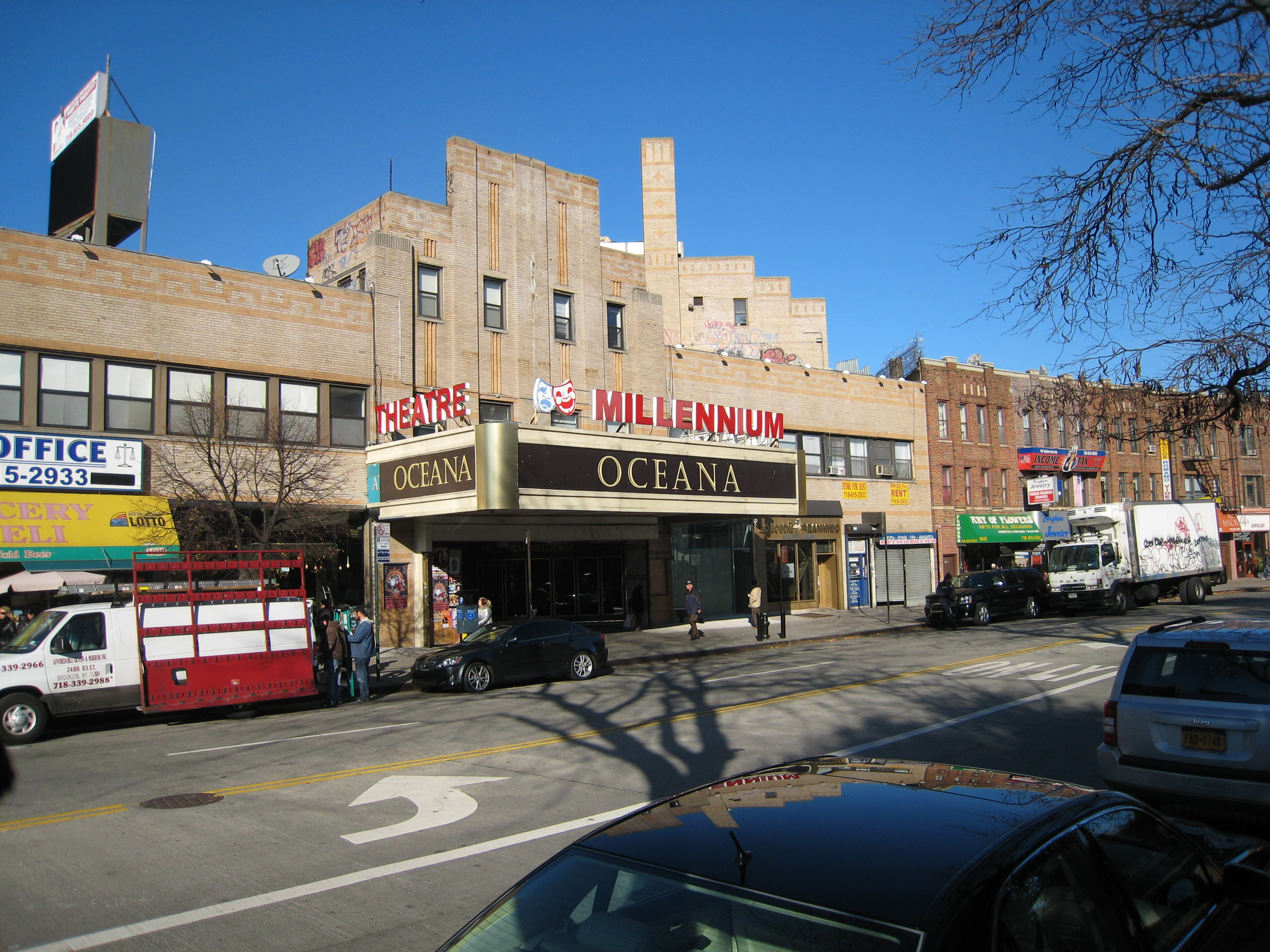
The "Millennium Theater", now the "Master Theater" and NetCost supermarket

After World War II, the quality of life in Brighton Beach decreased significantly as the poverty rate and the ratio of older residents to younger residents increased; this was primarily effectuated by the postwar codification of rent regulation in New York, which incentivized middle-aged residents and retirees (particularly the aforementioned first- and second-generation Jewish-American residents, many of whom had eschewed homeownership in favor of investing their savings in family businesses or postsecondary educations for their children) to retain their units in the prewar six-story semi-fireproof elevator apartment houses that lined Brightwater Court and other nearby thoroughfares for decades. During the 1970s fiscal crisis, the exodus of government workers and other middle class residents to suburban areas accelerated; accordingly, many of Brighton Beach's freestanding houses and bungalows were subdivided into single room occupancy residences for the poor, the elderly and the mentally ill. Brighton Beach suffered from arson as much as it did from constant drug trades. During the summer, however, people from all around the city continued to flock to Brighton Beach's beach next to the Atlantic Ocean.

In the mid-1970s, Brighton Beach became a popular place to settle for Soviet immigrants, mostly Ashkenazi Jews from Russia and Ukraine. So many Soviet Jews immigrated to Brighton Beach that the area became known as "Little Odessa" (after the Ukrainian city on the Black Sea with a significant Jewish population in the first half of 20th century).

The 1991 collapse of the Soviet Union and the subsequent significant changes in the social and economic circumstances of post-Soviet states led thousands of former Soviet citizens to immigrate to the United States. Many more immigrants from the former Soviet Union, who primarily spoke Russian, chose Brighton Beach as a place to settle. This included an influx of immigrants from the Caucasus, mostly from countries such as Georgia and Azerbaijan.

A large number of Russian immigrant firms, shops, restaurants, clubs, offices, banks, schools, and children's play centers opened in the area. The value of real estate in Brighton Beach started to rise again, even though drugs remained a social issue in the area through the early 1990s.

In the early 2000s, a high-income ocean-front condominium complex, the "Oceana", was constructed. This address has become the destination of wealthy businessmen, entertainers, and senior officials from the former Soviet Union, and with their purchase of units at the Oceana, area housing prices have risen.

Since the early 2010s, a significant number of Central Asian immigrants have also chosen Brighton Beach as a place to settle.

Today, Brighton Beach has many synagogues and Jewish institutions, including a Chabad center, a Mikvah and a Jewish day school called Mazel.

== Culture ==
Brighton Beach Avenue runs parallel to the Coney Island beach and boardwalk. The proximity of Brighton Beach to the city's beaches and the fact that the neighborhood is directly served by a subway station make it a popular summer weekend destination for New York City residents.

Brighton Beach's culture

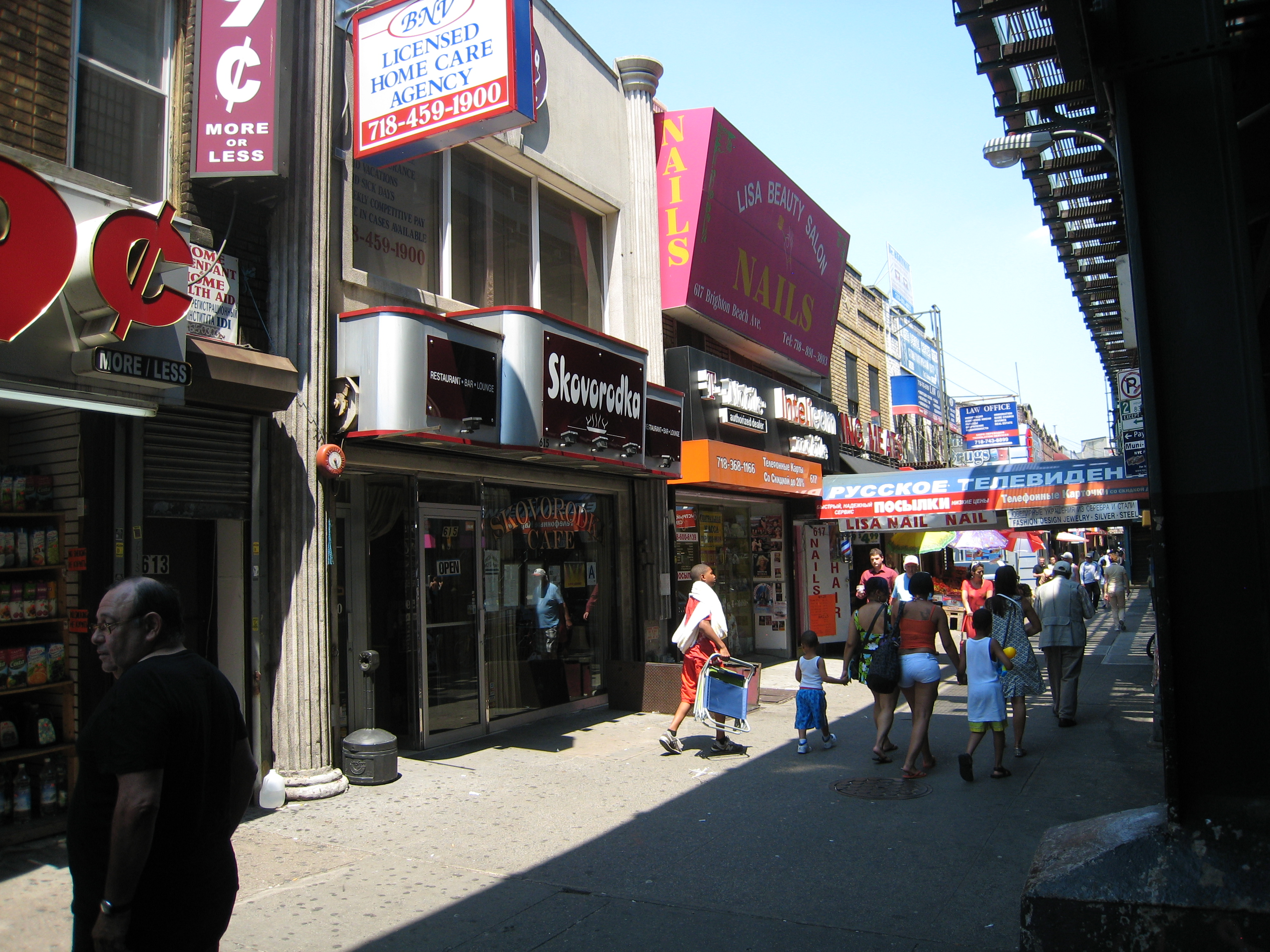
Russian stores in Brighton Beach

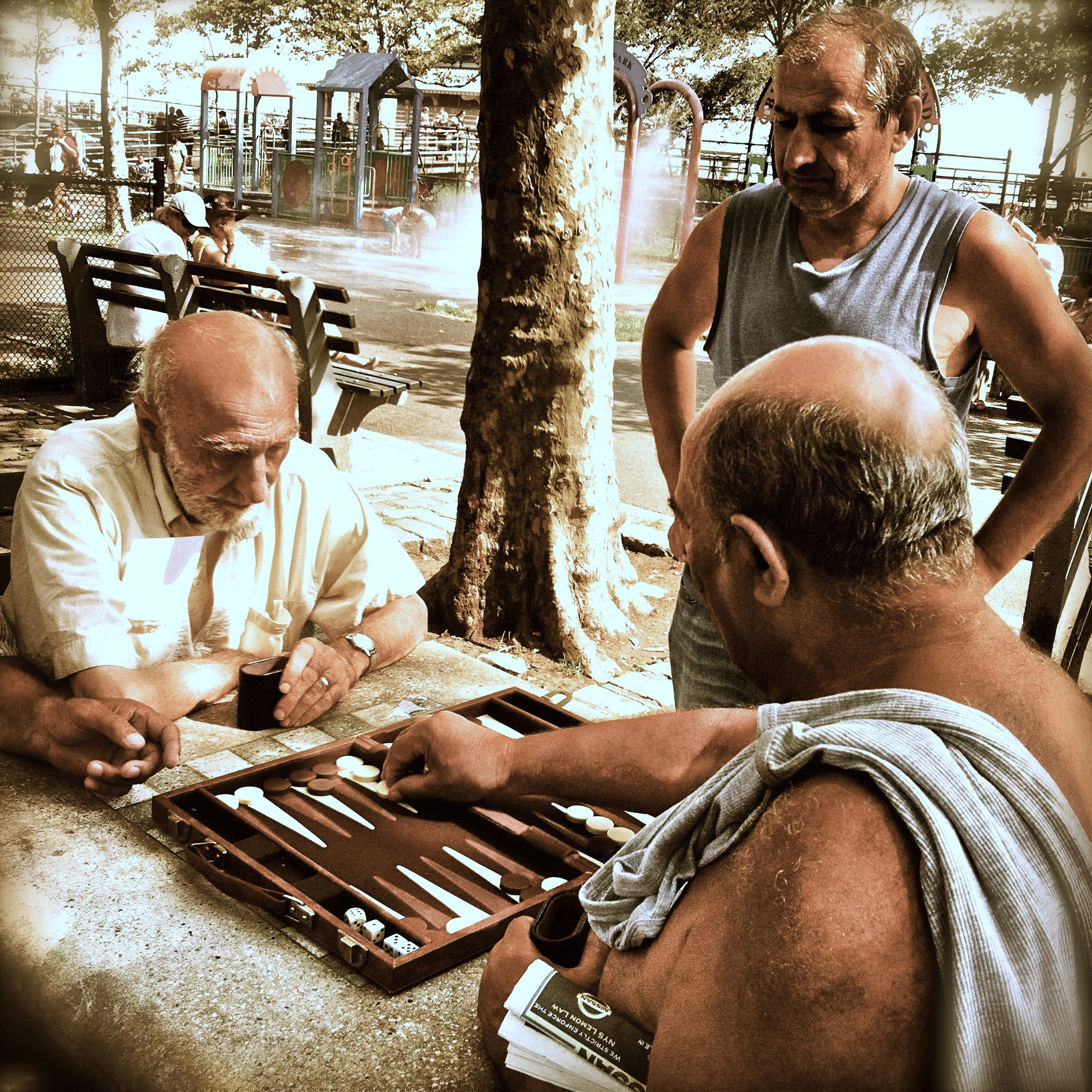
Backgammon players at Second Street Park in 2012

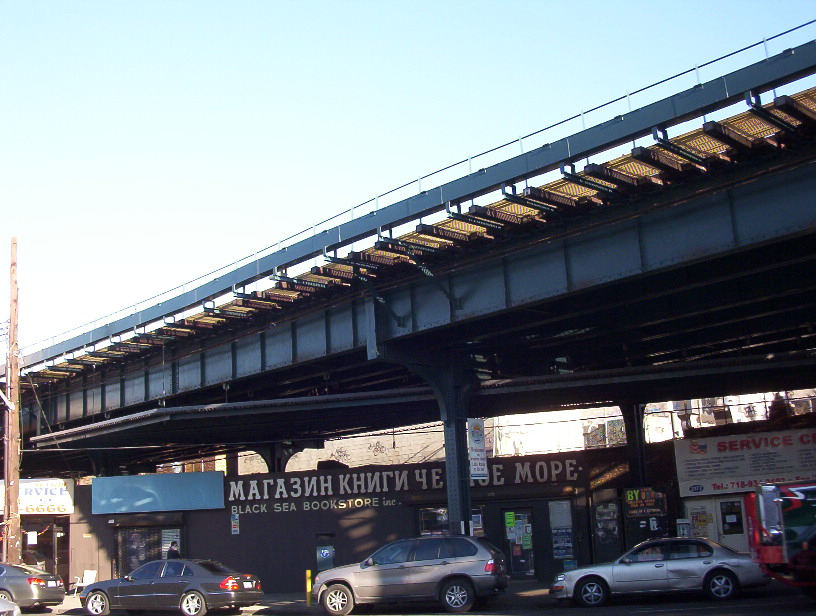
A Russian-language bookstore under the New York City Subway tracks on Coney Island Avenue in Brighton Beach

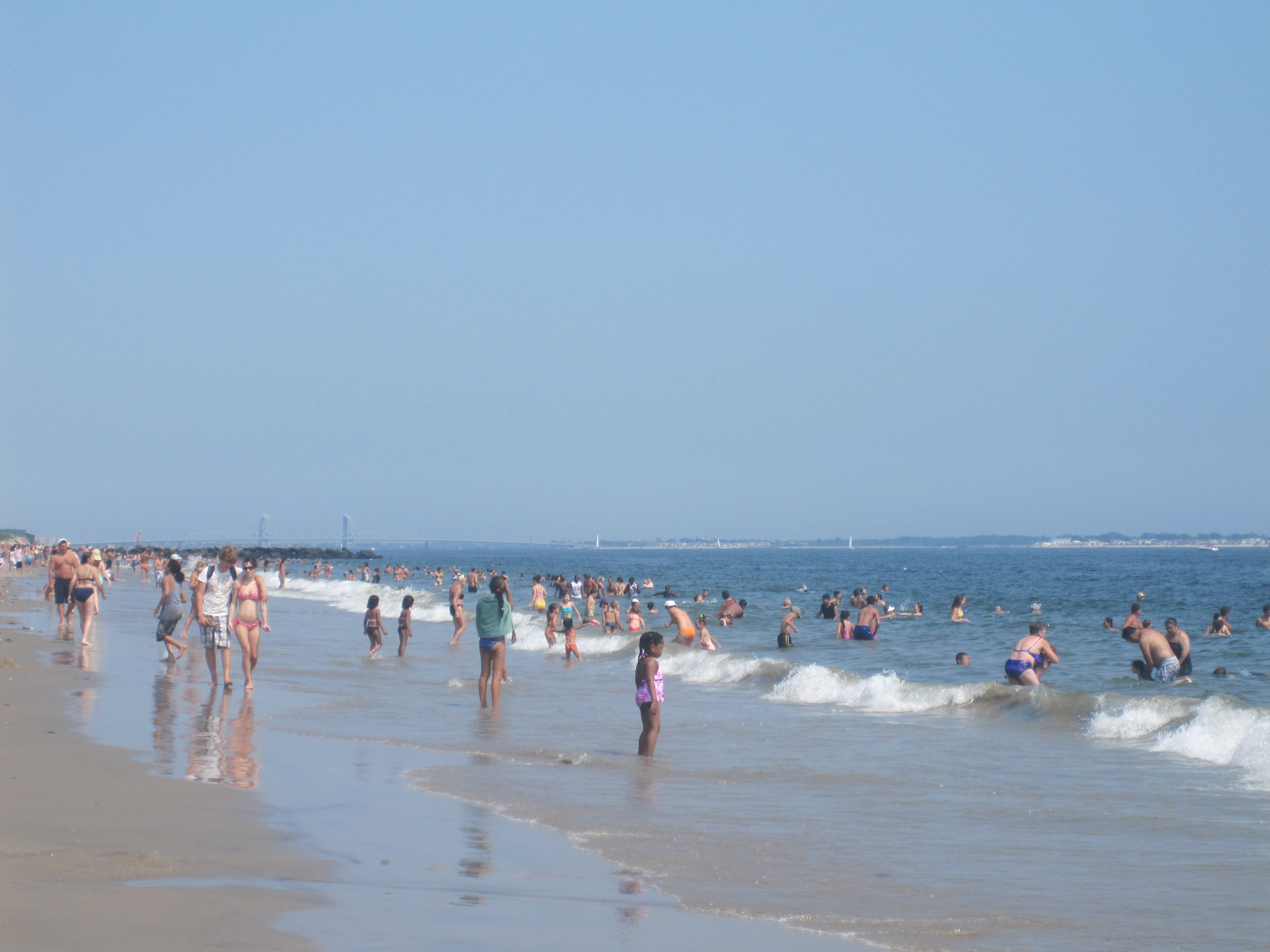
Crowded Brighton Beach on a summer afternoon

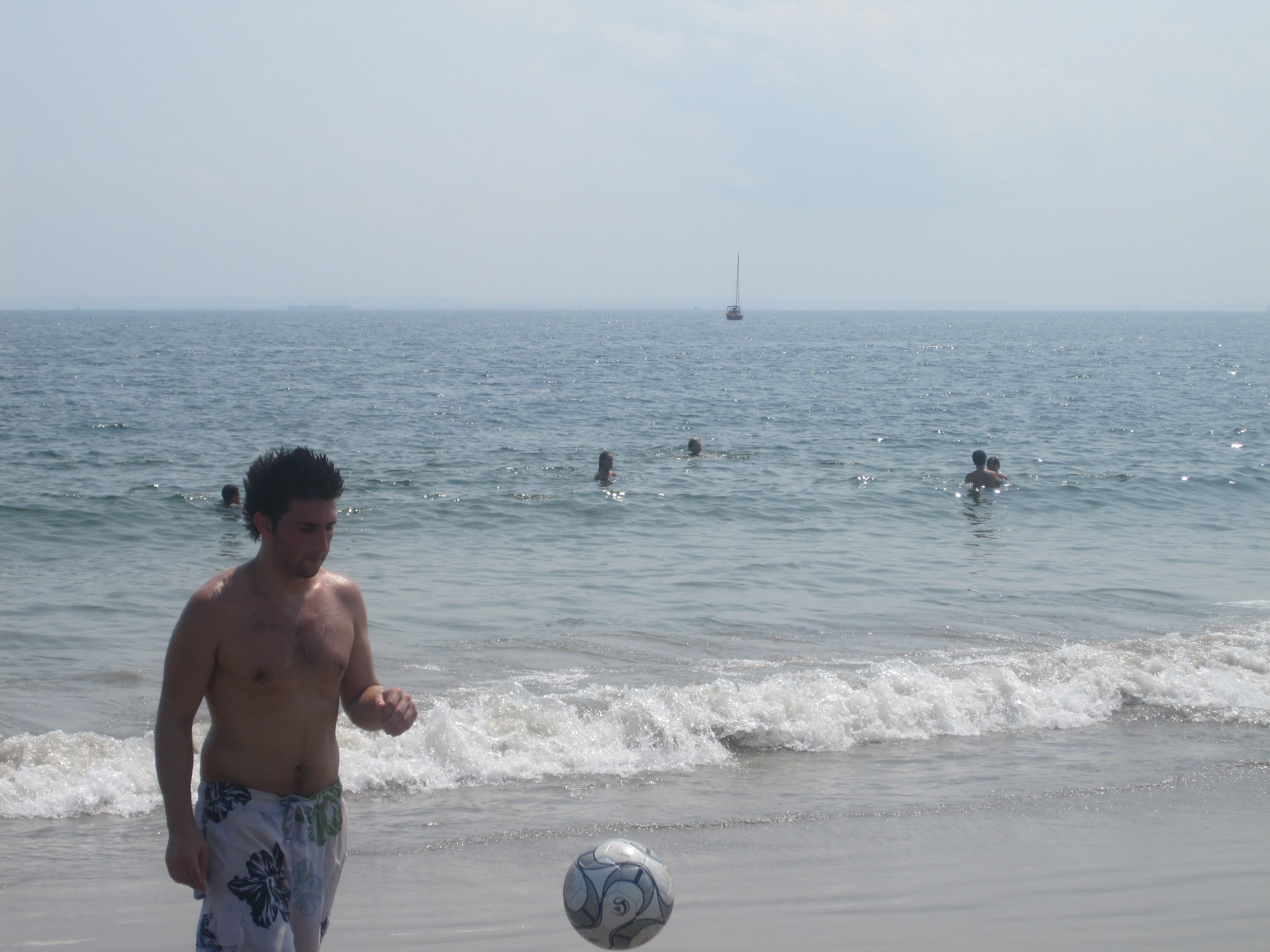
Water sports on Brighton Beach
Brighton Beach housing

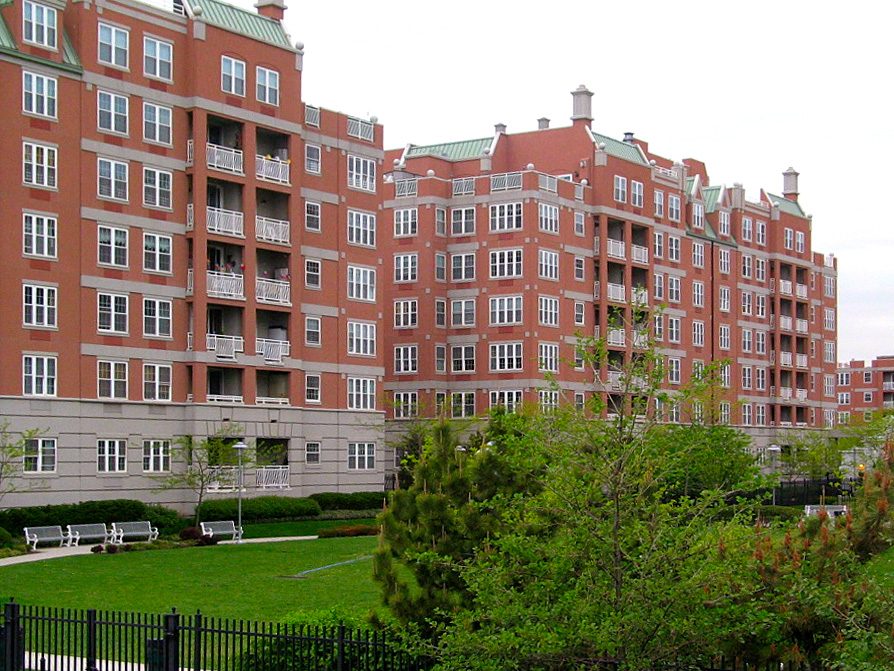
The Oceana luxury condominiums on Brighton Beach, built in the early 2000s

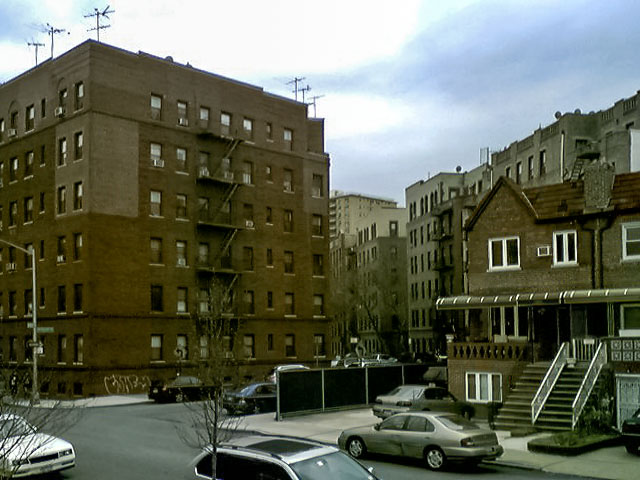
Juxtaposition of apartments and private homes

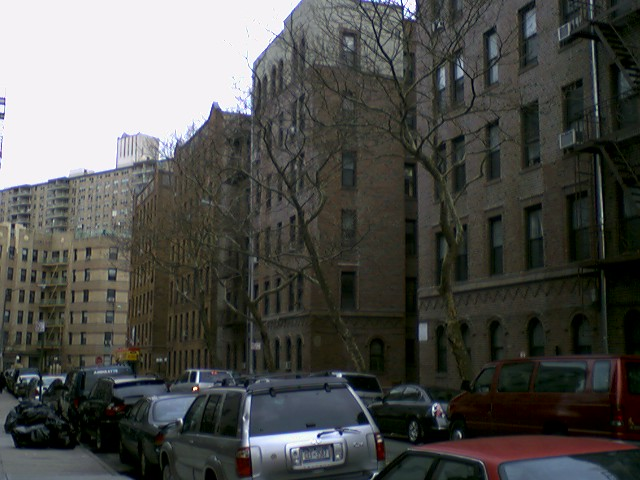
Brighton 15th Street

=== Russian-speaking culture ===
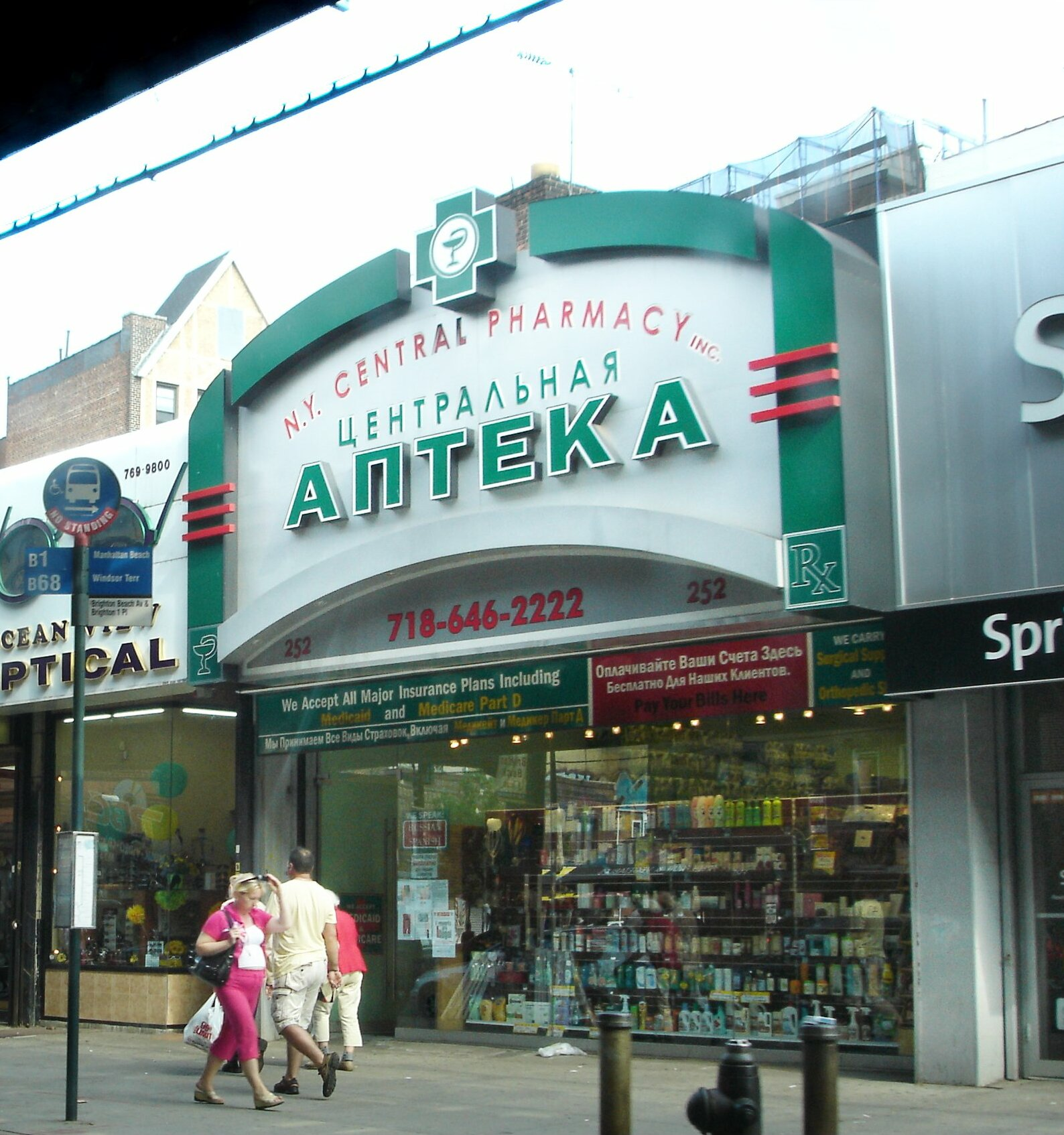
A Brighton Beach storefront's sign, which features both its English and Russian names.

As apartment buildings started to be built in large numbers in the 1930s, many of those who moved into the neighborhood were Jewish immigrants from Eastern Europe, often by way of the Lower East Side. They came from many countries, but also set the stage for a later wave of Jewish immigration from the Soviet Union that started in the 1970s, when Brighton Beach became known as "Little Odessa," and "Little Russia". An annual festival, the Brighton Jubilee, celebrates the area's Russian-speaking heritage, being populated heavily by Russian, Belarusian Americans, and Ukrainian Americans. The area has also been called "the land of pelmeni, matryoshkas, tracksuits, and...vodka" due to its large population of Soviet immigrants.

In 2006, Alec Brook-Krasny was elected for the 46th District of the New York State Assembly, which includes Brighton Beach, becoming the country's first elected Soviet-born politician.

=== Demographics ===
Based on data from the 2010 United States census, the population of Brighton Beach was 35,547, an increase of 303 (0.9%) from the 35,244 counted in 2000. Covering an area of 393.32 acres (159.17 ha), the neighborhood had a population density of 90.4 inhabitants per acre (57,900/sq mi; 22,300/km^{2}). The racial makeup of the neighborhood was 69.7% (24,774) White, 1.0% (352) African American, 0.2% (61) Native American, 12.9% (4,580) Asian, 0.0% (10) Pacific Islander, 0.4% (139) from other races, and 1.2% (442) from two or more races. Hispanic or Latino of any race were 14.6% (5,189) of the population.

In 1983, Brighton Beach consisted mostly of older, middle-class Jews; 27% of Brighton Beach was of age 62 or older, compared to the national average 13.9% at the time. Since the 1990s, however, the neighborhood's ethnic demographics have been changing, with a large influx of Central Asian immigrants—namely Uzbeks. In subsequent years, the proportion of whites leveled out, the proportion of blacks decreased significantly, and the proportion of Asians increased to 14% as of 2014. As of 2010, increasing numbers of Muslim Central Asians were moving into Brighton Beach, and based on the historic Soviet influence over these areas, these immigrants also speak Russian.

According to the United States Census report of 2010, Brighton Beach and Coney Island, combined, had 111,063 residents as of 2009. In that year, the median age of the combined Brighton Beach and Coney Island area was 47.9 years, substantially higher than the median age in Brooklyn of 34.2 and in New York City as a whole at 36.0. As DiNapoli and Bleiwas note in a city report, "the number of residents aged 65 years and older in [this area] rose by 4.1 percent, so that senior citizens accounted for more than one-quarter of the area's population" at that date. According to the census, the population density in Brighton Beach, per se (52,109 people per square mile), was almost twice the average population density of New York City (27,012 people per square mile), though the average household size was 2.1 people, lower than the city average of 2.6 people. The average income of households in the area was $36,574, while the average income in the whole city was $55,217, according to the 2010 census. In Brighton Beach, 21% of the population lives below the poverty line, compared to only 15.4% citywide.

Most of the population of Brighton Beach are immigrants. Less than a quarter (23.3%) of Brighton Beach residents were born in the United States, and nearly three-quarters were born abroad (72.9%). Because of this, English language proficiency in Brighton Beach is lower than the city average. More than a third (36.1%) of the population of Brighton Beach does not speak or understand English, while citywide, only one in fourteen people (7.2%) cannot speak or understand English.

The New York City Department of City Planning showed that in the 2020 census data that there were between 20,000 and 29,000 White residents and between 5,000 and 9,999 Asian residents, meanwhile each the Hispanic and Black populations were each less than 5000 residents.

=== Theater ===
The Brighton Ballet Theater, established in 1987, is one of the most famous Russian ballet schools in the United States. More than 3,000 children have trained in ballet, modern and character dances, and folk dances here.

A Russian-speaking theater near the waterfront, Master Theater, formerly the Millennium Theater and the Oceana Theatre, features performances by actors from the U.S., Russia, and other countries.

== Police and crime ==
Brighton Beach is patrolled by the NYPD's 60th Precinct, located at 2950 West Eighth Street. The 60th Precinct ranked 34th safest out of 69 patrol areas for per-capita crime in 2010. Between 1993 and 2010, major crimes decreased by 72%, including a 76% decrease in robberies, 71% decrease in felony assaults, and 67% decrease in shootings. The 60th Precinct has a substantially lower crime rate than in the 1990s, with crimes across all categories having decreased by 77.5% between 1990 and 2022. The precinct reported five murders, 16 rapes, 179 robberies, 373 felony assaults, 159 burglaries, 527 grand larcenies, and 121 grand larcenies auto in 2022.

Brighton Beach is considered a hot spot for the Russian Bratva, though public perception has been that organized crime "has largely gone away." In the 1970s, the most notorious leg of the mafia was the Potato Bag Gang, which served as a robbery gang for larger Russian crime syndicates in New York City. Marat Balagula was a crime boss from Brighton Beach who denies having any connection to the American Mafia or the Russian-speaking Mafia. The major Russian criminal element in Brighton Beach was the international Russian mafia group, known as vor v zakone or "vory," and the first vory crime boss in Brighton Beach was Evsei Agron, who controlled the area's crime during the 1970s and 1980s until his death in 1985. After the fall of the Soviet Union in the 1990s, many ethnic Russian criminals illegally entered the United States, coming especially to Brighton Beach. The infamous vor Vyacheslav Ivankov, who dominated the Brighton Beach underworld until his arrest in 1995, arrived during this wave.

== Fire safety ==
The New York City Fire Department (FDNY) operates the Engine Co. 246/Ladder Co. 169 firehouse at 2732 East 11th Street.

== Post office and ZIP Code ==
Brighton Beach's ZIP Code is 11235. The United States Postal Service operates the Brighton Station post office at 3157 Coney Island Avenue.

== Parks ==
There are several public parks in Brighton Beach, operated by the New York City Department of Parks and Recreation:

- The Coney Island Boardwalk and Beach run along the coastline south of Brighton Beach.
- Brighton Beach Playground, located on the Boardwalk at Brighton 2nd Street and Brightwater Court, was built in 1950 and renovated in the late 1990s.
- Asser Levy Park located near the Boardwalk between Surf Avenue and Sea Breeze Avenue.
- Century Playground, located on the site of former summer bungalows near PS 370, was built in the late 1960s and renovated in 2012.
- Grady Playground, located on an irregular area between Shore Parkway, Brighton 3rd Street, and Brighton 4th Street. It contains baseball fields, basketball courts, handball courts, playgrounds, and water spray showers.
- A traffic island at Brighton 14th Street, Corbin Place, and Ocean View Avenue was dedicated as Babi Yar Triangle in 1981, in honor of the victims of the Babi Yar massacre, and renovated in 1988.

== Transportation ==
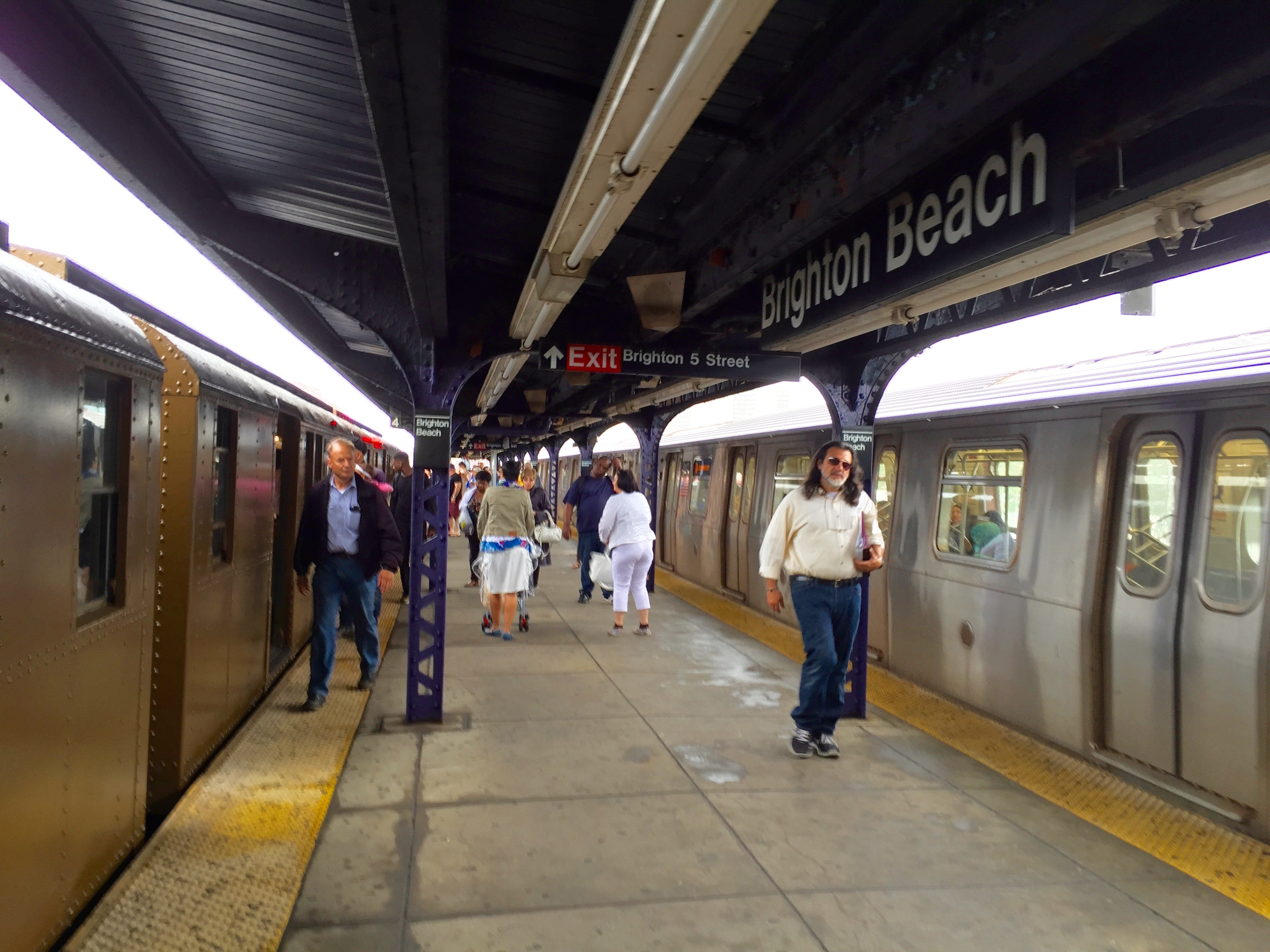
The Brighton Beach subway station

The New York City Subway serves the neighborhood at the Brighton Beach (B and Q trains) and Ocean Parkway (Q train) stations. Both are located on the elevated Brighton Line structure over Brighton Beach Avenue. Buses serving Brighton Beach include the B1, B4, B36 and B68.

== Education ==
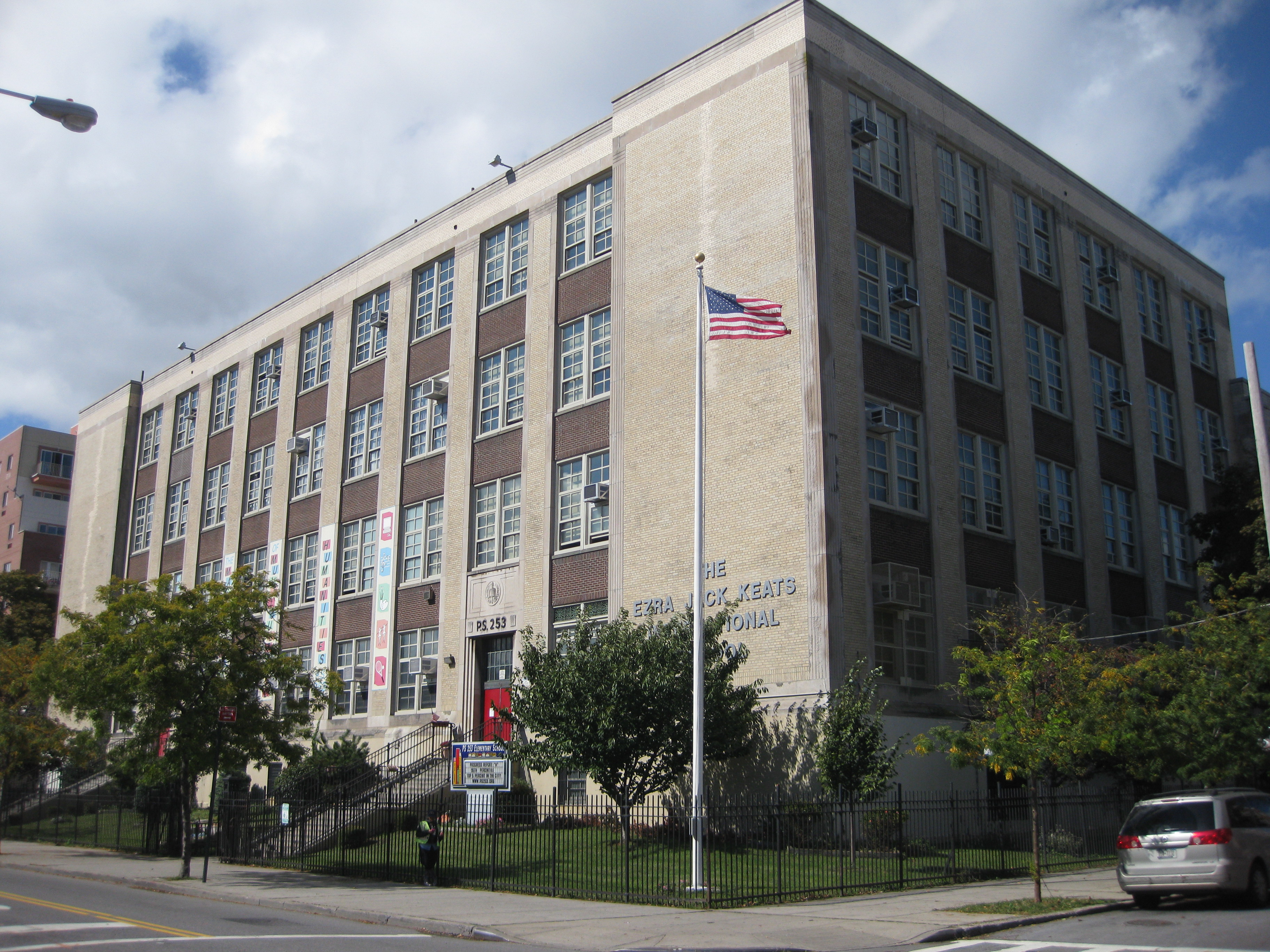
P.S. 253 Ezra Jack Keats International School/The Magnet School of Multicultural Humanities

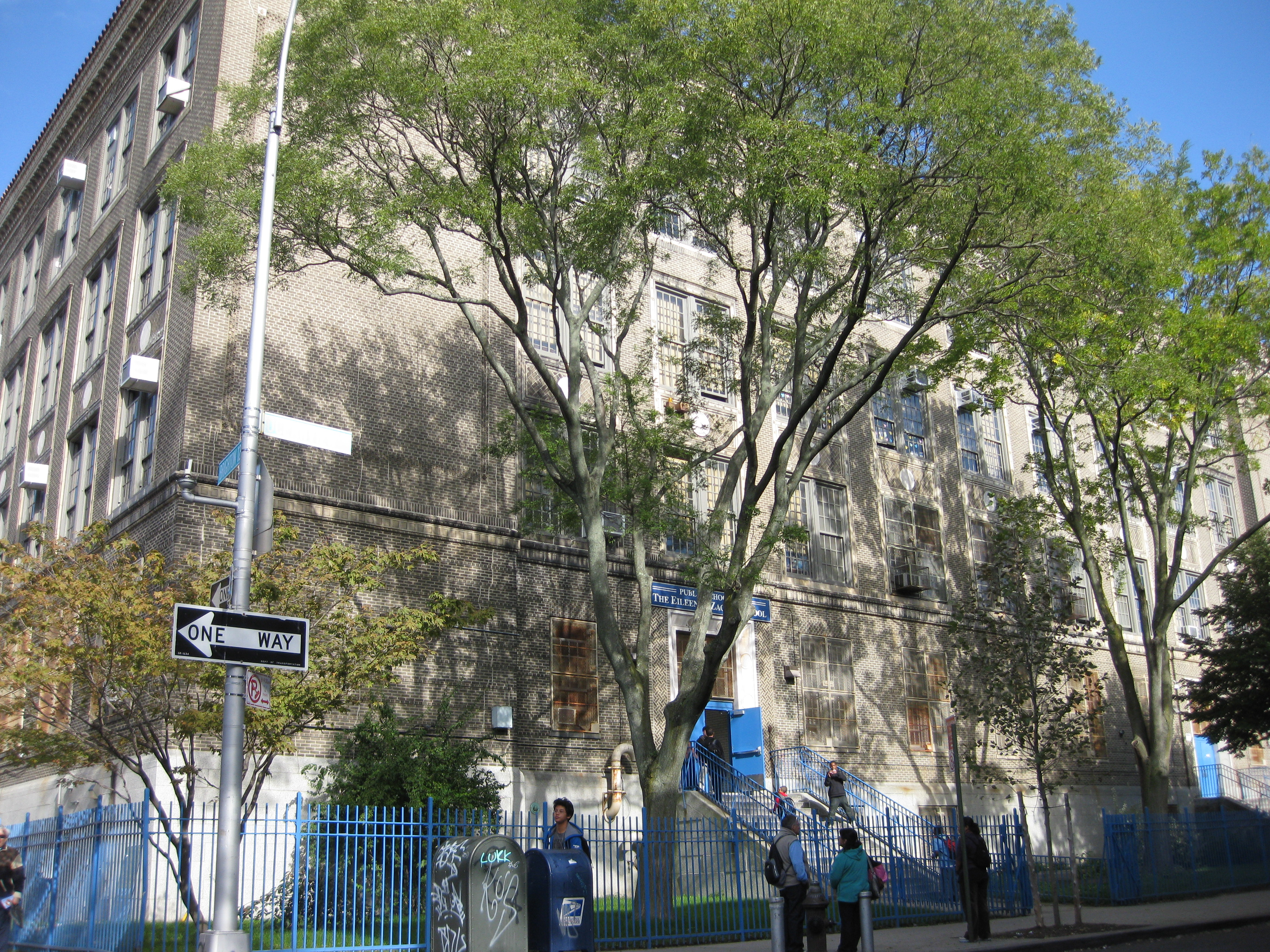
P.S. 225 The Eileen E. Zaglin School

=== Schools ===
Brighton Beach is served by the New York City Department of Education. Primary and middle schools within Brighton Beach include P.S. 225 The Eileen E. Zaglin School for grades K–8, and P.S. 253 the Ezra Jack Keats International School. In 1983, the Community School District 21 operated PS 225, PS 253, and Junior High School 302. During that year, over 62% of its students read at or above their grade level, far above the national average. PS 100, The Coney Island School for grades K–5 and 303 Herbert S. Eisenberg are both located nearby in Coney Island.

William E. Grady CTE High School, a vocational school, is located in Brighton Beach. Abraham Lincoln High School, an academic high school, is in Coney Island. In 1983 Lincoln was the zoned academic high school of Brighton Beach. Other nearby high schools include the Rachel Carson High School for Coastal Studies and The Leon M. Goldstein High School for the Sciences.

=== Library ===
The Brooklyn Public Library's Brighton Beach branch is located at 16 Brighton First Road, near Brighton Beach Avenue. The branch contains a large collection of media in Russian. The branch opened in December 1949, but due to high patronage, moved to its current location in 1964. The branch was renovated in the early 1990s.

== In popular culture ==
The neighborhood has been mentioned or appears many times in popular culture:

- Film
  - Brighton Beach is featured in the Russian-American spy-comedy film Weather Is Good on Deribasovskaya, It Rains Again on Brighton Beach (1992).
  - The crime drama film Little Odessa (1994) is set in Brighton Beach.
  - In the action thriller film Maximum Risk (1996), starring Jean-Claude Van Damme, the main character faces off against the Russian Mob in Brighton Beach.
  - The psychological drama film Requiem for a Dream (2000) is largely set in Brighton Beach.
  - Brighton Beach is featured in the Russian crime drama film Brother 2 (2000).
  - Brighton Beach is featured in the crime drama Lord of War (2005), starring Nicolas Cage, where the protagonist and his family immigrated to from Ukraine in order to escape the Soviet Union.
  - In the romantic drama film Two Lovers (2008), the action takes place in Brighton Beach.
  - The Georgian drama film Brighton 4th (2021) is set largely in Brighton Beach, telling the story of immigrants from the country of Georgia.
  - The romantic comedy-drama film Anora (2024) is set against the backdrop of Brighton Beach, which is the Russian-speaking protagonist's hometown.
  - Spider-Man: Brand New Day (2026) features Brighton Beach as the neighborhood in which Yelena Belova's spa "office" is located.
- Literature
  - In Robin Cook's novel Vector (2000), disillusioned former Russian biochemical worker Yuri Davydov develops weapons-grade anthrax in the basement of his Brighton Beach home.
  - Hubert Selby's novel Requiem for a Dream is set in Brighton Beach during the 1970s.
  - "B for Brighton Beach" Mikhail Salita
  - "Princess of Brighton" (Russian edition) Mikhail Salita
- Plays
  - Neil Simon's play Brighton Beach Memoirs (1983), which won two Tony Awards in 1983, as well as its 1986 film adaptation, are both set against the backdrop of Brighton Beach during the Great Depression, in 1937.
- Television
  - A Lifetime reality TV show called Russian Dolls, documenting the lives of young Russian-Americans and a group of Brighton Beach housewives spending time in a popular Russian nightclub, Rasputin Restaurant, premiered August 11, 2011.
  - Episode 7,Witness of Person of Interest season 1 centers on a gang war in Brighton Beach.
- Video games
  - Brighton Beach is prominently featured as a fictionalised version in the video game Grand Theft Auto IV (as "Hove Beach"), and is where the player's first safe-house is.
- Music
  - The Russian metal band E.S.T. has a song called Brighton Beach about the neighborhood and its history.

== Notable residents ==
Notable current and former residents of Brighton Beach include:

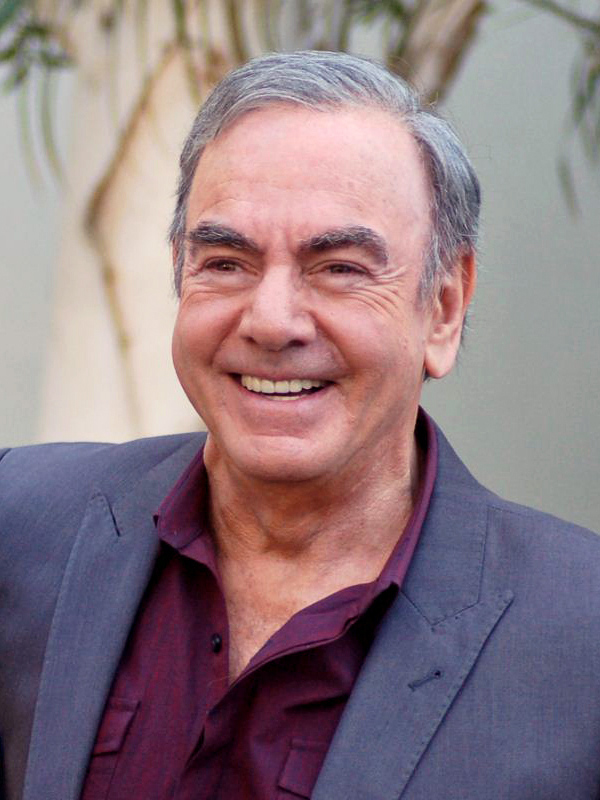
Neil Diamond

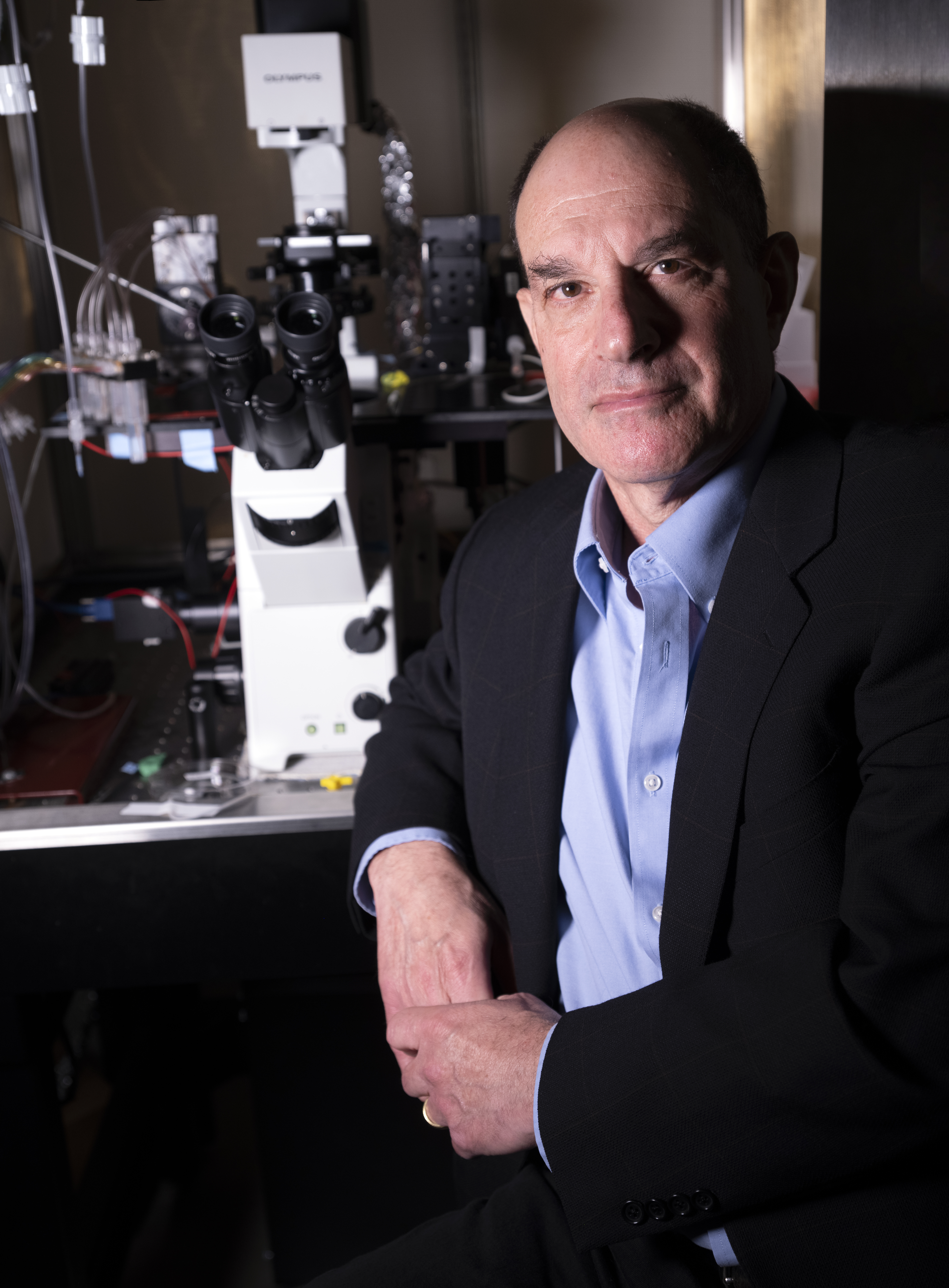
David Julius

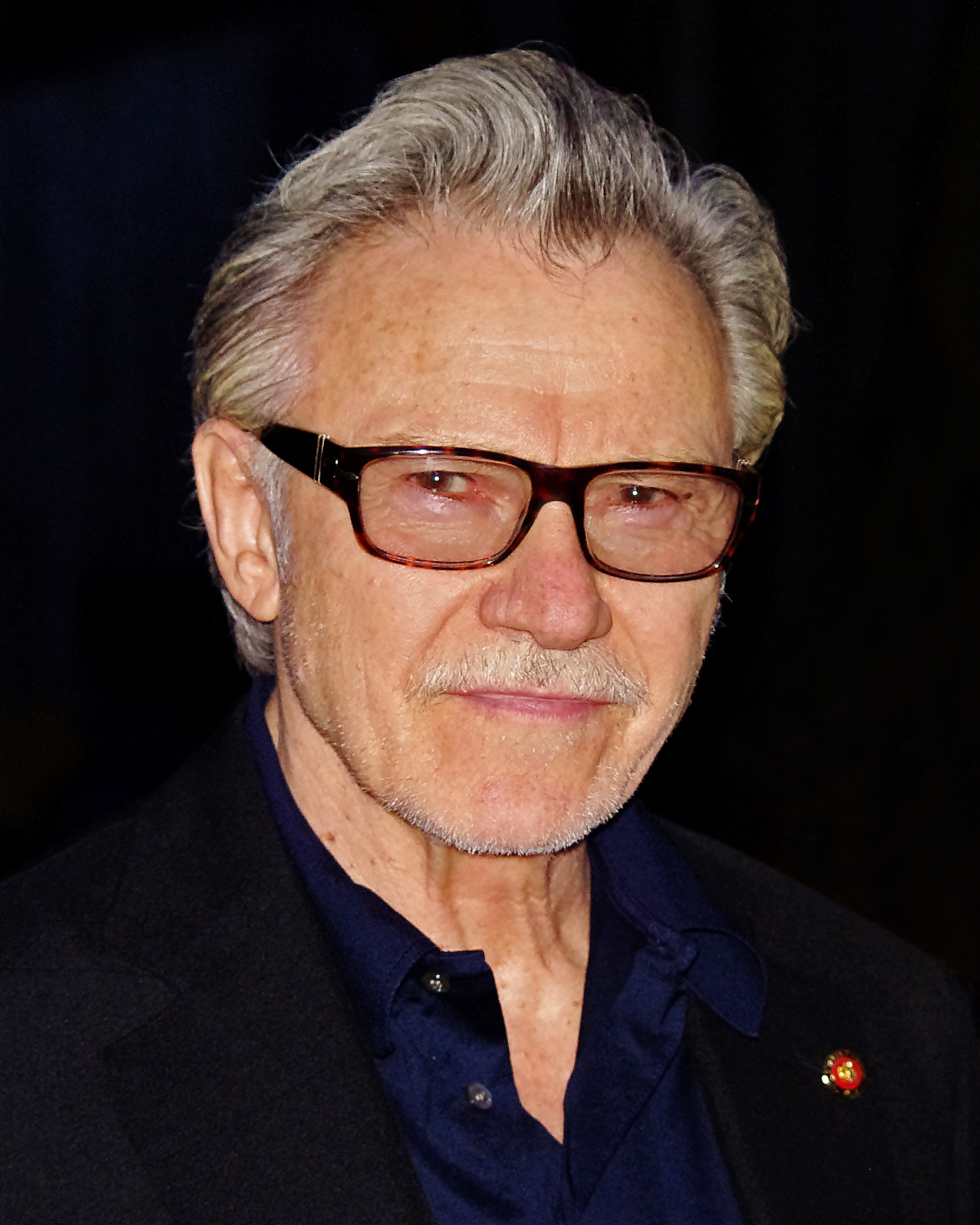
Harvey Keitel

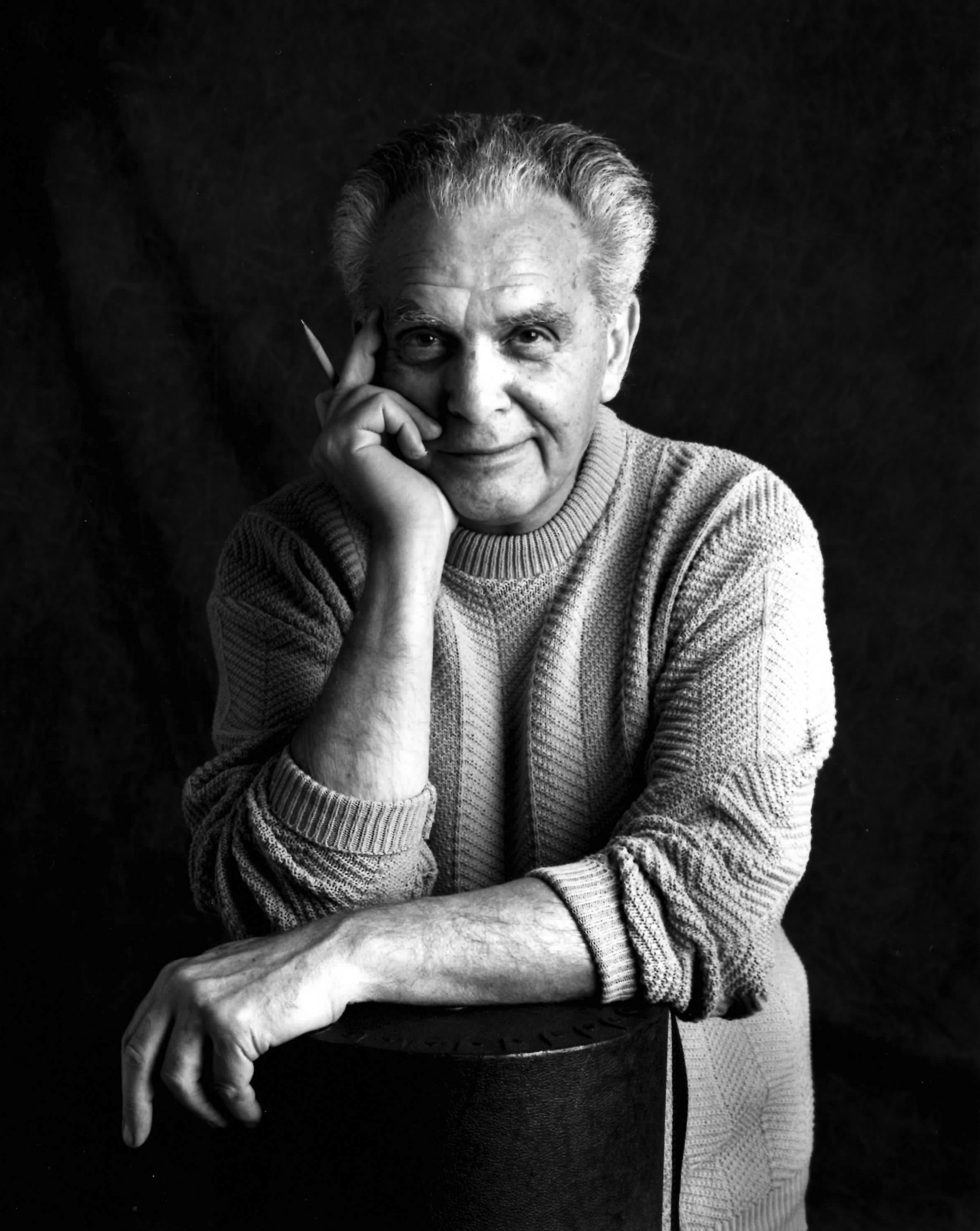
Jack Kirby

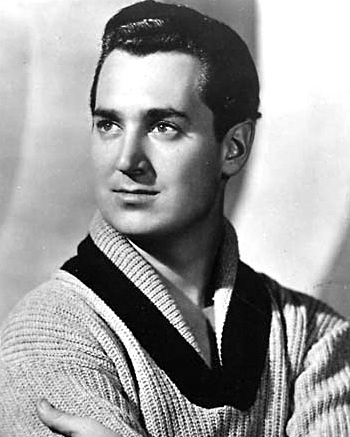
Neil Sedaka

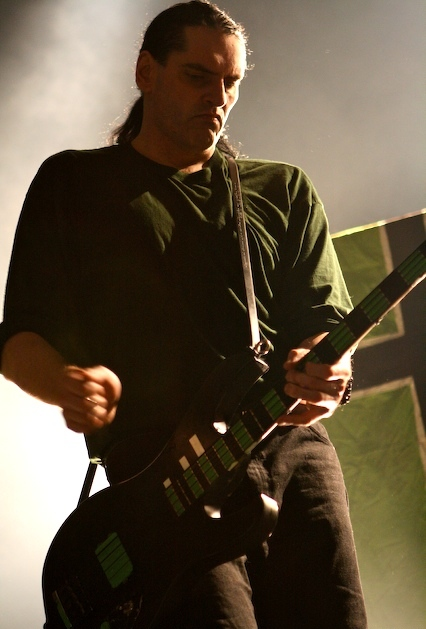
Peter Steele

- Marv Albert (born Marvin Aufrichtig, 1941), sportscaster
- Marat Balagula (1943–2019), neighborhood mob boss during the 1980s
- Herbert Berman (1933–2014), politician who served on the New York City Council
- Gail Brodsky (born 1991), professional tennis player
- Jack Carter (born Jack Chakrin; 1922– 2015), comedian, actor, and television presenter
- Adele Cohen (born 1942), member of the New York State Assembly, representing the 46th district, from to 1998 to 2006
- Herb Cohen (born 1940), 2x Olympic foil fencer
- Eddie Daniels (born 1941), clarinettist, saxophonist, and composer
- Neil Diamond (born 1941), singer-songwriter, musician artist grew up in Brighton Beach
- Jane Freilicher (1924–2014), representational painter of urban and country scenes
- Howard Greenfield (1936–1986), lyricist and songwriter
- Alfred Harvey (born Alfred Harvey Wiernikoff, 1913–1994), founder of Harvey Comics
- David B. Hollander (1913–2009), longest active pulpit rabbi in America
- Vyacheslav Ivankov (1940–2009), alleged crime boss
- David Julius (born 1955), Nobel laureate in Physiology or Medicine (2021)
- Harvey Keitel (born 1939), actor and producer.
- Jack Kirby (1917–1994), comic book artist, co-creator of Captain America during the early 1940s and the Fantastic Four, X-Men, and Incredible Hulk in the 1960s
- Sergei Kobozev (1964–1995), Russian boxer
- Jack Laub (1926–2023), professional basketball player, drafted by the NBA's Baltimore Bullets, recipient of the French Legion of Honor, and pharmaceutical executive
- Victor Niederhoffer (1943–2026), hedge fund manager, 8x U.S. Squash Champion and 4x Paddleball Champion, bestselling author, and statistician.
- Lea Bayers Rapp (born 1946), author, journalist, playwright
- Vladimir Reznikov, Russian-American hitman, murdered outside of the infamous Odessa Restaurant in 1986
- Gene Russianoff, chief spokesman for the Straphangers Campaign, a public transport advocacy group that focuses primarily on subway and bus services run by New York City Transit
- Neil Sedaka (born 1939), singer, songwriter, and pianist
- Seymour Siwoff (1920–2019), president and chief executive of the Elias Sports Bureau for seven decades
- Rick Sklar (1929–1992), radio program director, was one of the originators of the Top 40 radio format
- Peter Steele (1962–2010), lead singer, bassist, and composer of the gothic metal band Type O Negative, who grew up in Brighton Beach, and has Brighton Beach as a returning symbol in several of his songs with Type O Negative.
- Alexander Steinweiss (1917–2011), graphic design artist, invented album cover art
- Boris Thomashefsky (1866–1939), Ukrainian-born Jewish singer and actor who became one of the biggest stars in Yiddish theatre
- Willi Tokarev (1934–2019), Russian-American singer and songwriter
- The Tokens, doo-wop vocal group formed in 1955 at Abraham Lincoln High School
- Jerry Wurf (1919–1981), labor leader and president of the American Federation of State, County and Municipal Employees (AFSCME) from 1964 to 1981

Disco Freddy (also called Larry the Unbelievable), was a character on the Riegelmann Boardwalk during the 1970s through the 1980s. During his heyday, he was about 60 years old.

== See also ==
- Jackson–Vanik amendment
- Russian diaspora
- Odesan Russian
