= Russian Americans in New York City =

Ethnic group

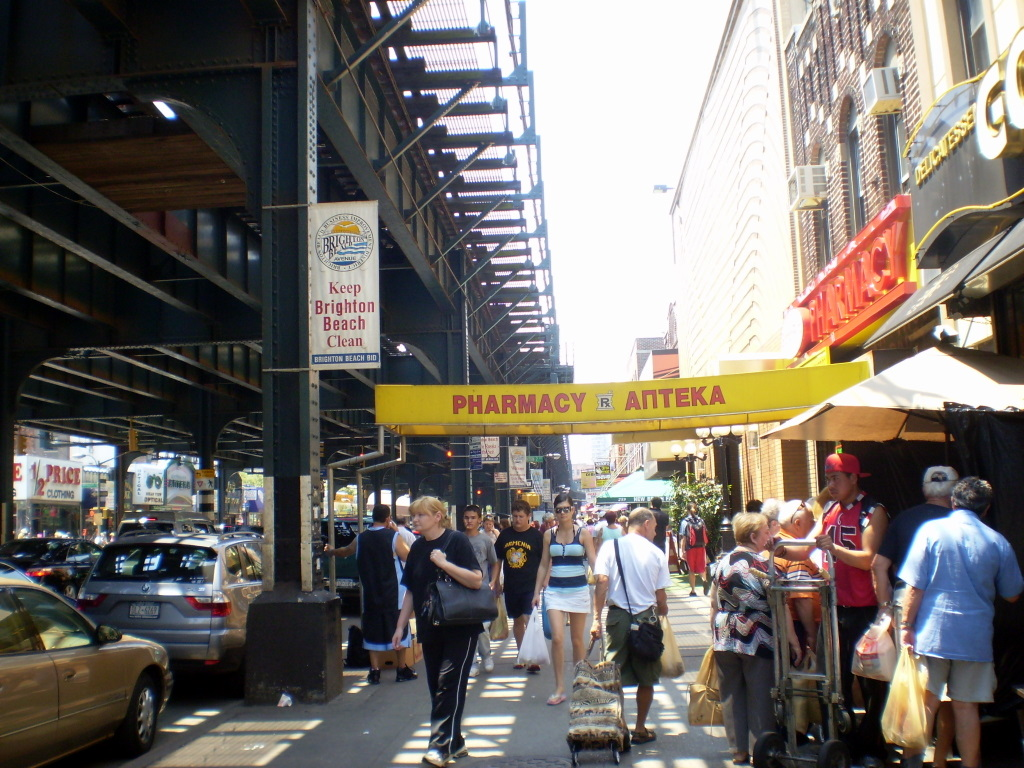
"Little Russia" or "Little Odessa" in Brighton Beach, Brooklyn

New York City is home to the largest Russian and Russophone population in the Western Hemisphere.

The largest Russian-American communities in New York City are located in Brighton Beach and Sheepshead Bay in Brooklyn. Brighton Beach has been nicknamed Little Odessa due to its population of Russian-speaking immigrants from the former Soviet Union.

== History ==
The first Russian immigrants to the United States arrived in the end of the 18th century (one of the first immigrants from Russia was Demetrius Galitzen, a Russian noble who became a Catholic priest in Mount Savage, Md.). Historians differ on the number and timing of the waves of Russian immigration. The first large influx of refugees from Russia, primarily to New York City, began in the 1880s after massive pogroms and restrictions imposed upon the Jews in the Russian Empire. By the time of the Russian Revolution, prominent political exiles from Russia in New York included Leon Trotsky, Nikolai Bukharin, and Emma Goldman. With the start of the Revolution of February 1917 some Russian exiles moved back to Russia to participate in the Revolution; some of the radicals who stayed in the US suffered from Palmer Raids of 1919 and some were deported from the US. After the Bolshevik takeover in October 1917 and their victory in the Civil War of 1918-20, some of their opponents, including Alexander Kerensky, fled to the US (some call this the "First Wave" of Russian immigration). Many of them made their way to New York City, most of them moving to Hamilton Heights, Manhattan, and other sections of New York City. Many emigres of this wave also moved to the US on the eve of WWII from Western European countries already occupied by the Nazis.

The so-called "Third Wave" of Russians were largely Russian (Soviet) Jews, who came primarily as refugees during the 1970s to Brighton Beach, as well as Rego Park/Forest Hills, Washington Heights and other parts of the city, including Manhattan. Immigrant writers and artists of this wave in New York included Joseph Brodsky, Mikhail Baryshnikov, Sergei Dovlatov and Eduard Limonov.

== Demographics ==
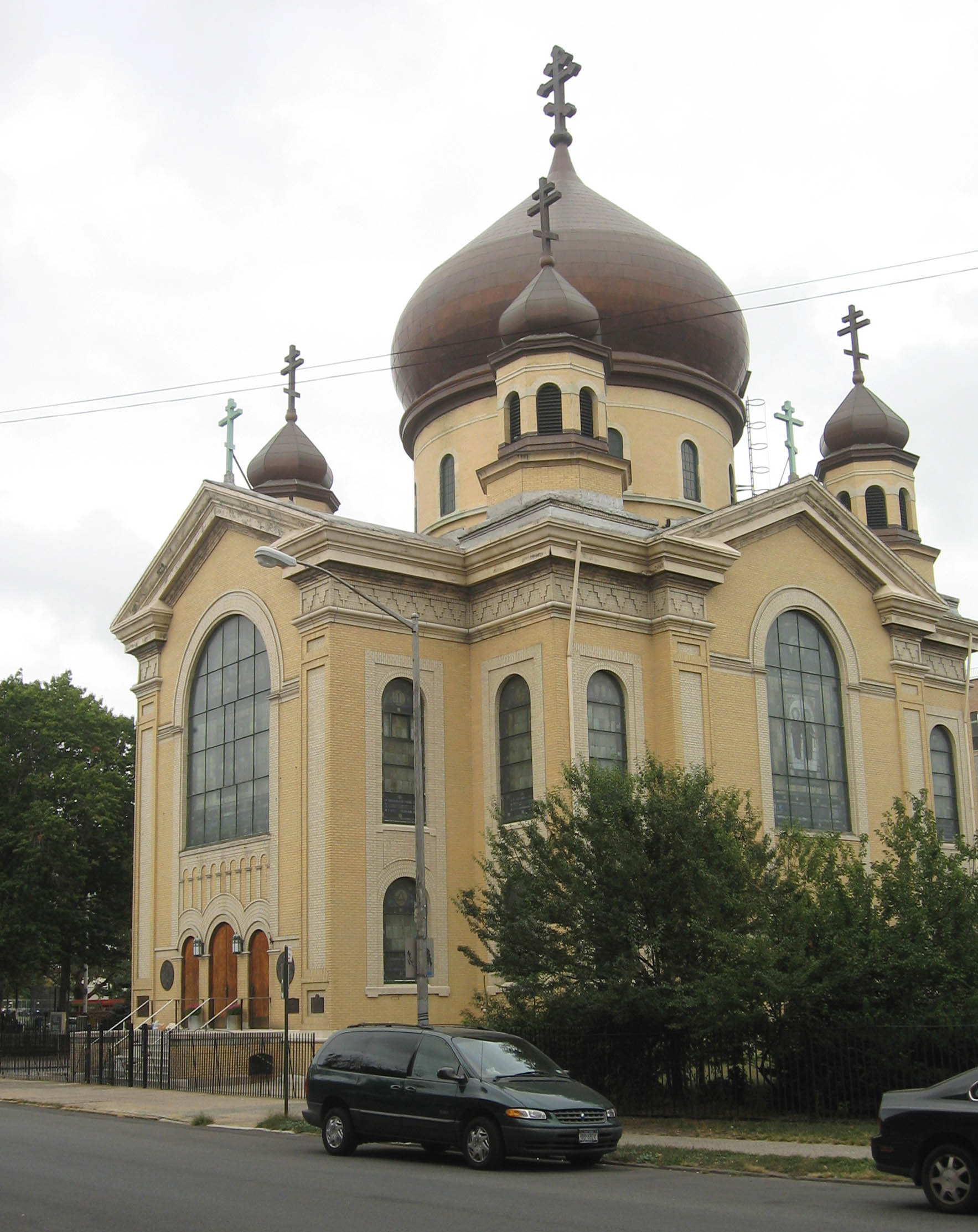
Russian Orthodox Cathedral of the Transfiguration of Our Lord, Williamsburg, Brooklyn

The New York Tri-State area has a population of 1.6 million Russian-Americans and 600,000 of them live in New York City. There are over 220,000 Russian-speaking Jews living in New York City. Approximately 100,000 Russian Americans in the New York metropolitan area were born in Russia.

New York City also has a large population of immigrants born in Central Asia, Ukraine, Belarus, and other ex-Soviet states. Most of the Central Asian immigrants are from Uzbekistan, Kazakhstan, Kyrgyzstan, and Tajikistan, and due to their Soviet influence, most of them speak the Russian language.

The New York metropolitan area continues to be by far the leading metropolitan gateway for Russian immigrants into the United States. In 2013, 1,974 individuals immigrated to the New York–Northern New Jersey–Long Island statistical area from Russia alone, not including immigrants from other previous Soviet bloc countries; in 2012, this number was 2,286; 1,435 in 2011; and 1,283 in 2010. These numbers do not include the remainder of the New York-Newark-Bridgeport, NY-NJ-CT-PA Combined Statistical Area. Brighton Beach, Brooklyn continues to be the most important demographic and cultural center for the Russian American experience. However, as Russian Americans have climbed in socioeconomic status, the diaspora from Russia and other former Soviet-bloc states have moved toward more affluent parts of the New York metropolitan area, notably Bergen County, New Jersey. Within Bergen County, the increasing size of the Russian immigrant presence in its hub of Fair Lawn prompted a 2014 April Fool's satire titled, "Putin Moves Against Fair Lawn".

== Politics ==
As of 2012, Russians generally back the Republican Party, leaning more towards the Republicans than most New Yorkers in general or most immigrant New Yorkers in particular. However, Russian-American voters sometimes support established Democratic politicians who have campaigned in Russian-speaking communities and who have dedicated money to Russian-American causes. Russian-speaking candidates from both political parties often enjoy support from the Russian community when running against non-Russophone candidates. Because of the importance of political primaries in majority-Democratic New York City, Russians may register as Democrats as often as Republicans, despite voting mostly Republican during general elections. The right-wing preference of many Russian-American voters is often motivated by their opposition to Communism and socialism, having an unfavorable view of the Soviet Communism they previously lived under.

== See also ==
- Russian Dolls, 2011 reality TV series about Russian-American families in Brighton Beach
- Russian Tea Room, restaurant on West 57th Street, opened in 1927
- Russian Mission School in New York
- Consulate-General of Russia in New York City
- Novy Mir, 1916/17 magazine
- Belarusian Americans in New York City
- Demographics of New York City
