= Robert I. Friedman =

American journalist

Robert I. Friedman (November 29, 1950 – July 2, 2002) was an American investigative journalist.

In 1993, Friedman castigated the FBI for ignoring information it had developed on the Muslim extremists behind the first bombing of the World Trade Center. The report earned him a Society of Professional Journalists (SPJ) Award for Best Investigative Reporting in a Weekly.

Friedman wrote about Meir Kahane and the Jewish Defense League (JDL), and the book Red Mafiya about the Russian mob and its entry into the U.S. Friedman described the rise of Russian crime boss Vyachelsav Kirillovich Ivankov.

His reporting resulted in Friedman receiving death threats throughout his career. The FBI at one point informed him that Russian organized crime boss Semion Mogilevich had put a contract out on his life.

Robert I. Friedman died on July 2, 2002, at the age of 51 as the result of a rare disease he contracted while in India working on a story about human trafficking and sexual slavery.

== Legacy ==
The "Robert I. Friedman Award" is given out to investigative journalists by the board of the Fund for Investigative Journalism.

== Books by Robert I. Friedman ==
- (1990): The False Prophet Rabbi Meir Kahane, From FBI Informant To Knesset Member. Published by Lawrence Hill & Co., Brooklyn, NY, ISBN 1556520786
- (1992): Zealots for Zion. Inside Israels West Bank Settlement Movement. Published by Random House, New York. ISBN 0394580532
- (2000): Red Mafiya: How the Russian Mob Has Invaded America Published by Little, Brown and Company, Boston, New York, London ISBN 0316294748
