= Mob Museum =

History museum in Downtown Las Vegas, Nevada

The Mob Museum National Museum of Organized Crime and Law Enforcement
- Museum logo
- Established: 14 February 2012; 14 years ago
- Location: 300 E Stewart Avenue; Las Vegas, NV 89101, USA
- Coordinates: 36.172823°N 115.141252°W
- Type: History
- President: Jonathan Ullman
- Chairperson: Steve Martinez
- Website: themobmuseum.org

The Mob Museum, officially the National Museum of Organized Crime and Law Enforcement, is a history museum located in Downtown Las Vegas, Nevada, United States.

Opened on February 14, 2012, the Mob Museum is dedicated to featuring the artifacts, stories, and history of organized crime in the United States, as well as the actions and initiatives by law enforcement to prevent such crimes. The museum is housed in the former Las Vegas Post Office and Courthouse, which was built in 1933 and is listed on the National Register of Historic Places. The museum is located on Stewart Avenue, two blocks north of Fremont Street, the main artery of the downtown casino district.

Developed under the creative direction of Dennis Barrie, co-creator of the International Spy Museum and the Rock and Roll Hall of Fame, the museum is a 501(c)3 non-profit organization governed by a non-profit board of directors. The museum is dedicated to the contentious relationship between organized crime and law enforcement within the historical context of Las Vegas and the entire United States.

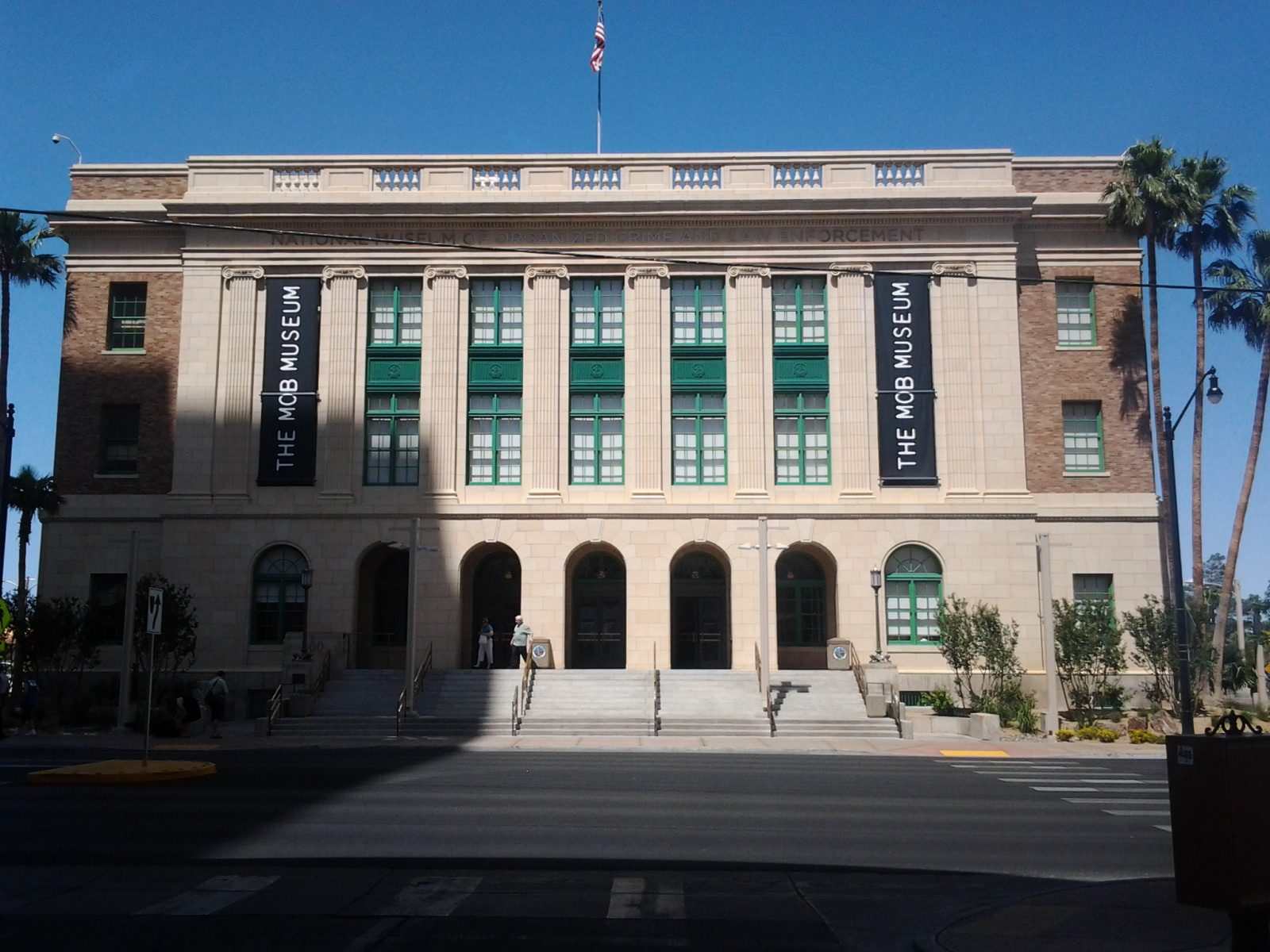
The front of the museum

== History ==
In 2000, the federal government sold the former post office and federal courthouse to the city for $1, with stipulations that the building be restored to its original look and be used for a cultural purpose.

Then-Mayor Oscar Goodman, himself a former Mob defense attorney, had the idea for a mob museum in 2002. The idea faced early opposition from Italian-American groups, while being supported by the FBI, including the former head agent in Las Vegas, Ellen Knowlton, who joined as president of the museum's board.

The project budget was estimated at $50 million, including $26 million for restoring the building. Funding included federal, state, and local grants. Goodman generated controversy by suggesting that federal stimulus money could be used for the museum.

The museum opened February 14, 2012. (The morning and day before were reserved for press and dignitary ceremonies.) As of summer 2026, general admission is $37.95 for adults ($19.95 for Nevada residents), with varying prices for other categories such as students and groups.

== Exhibits ==
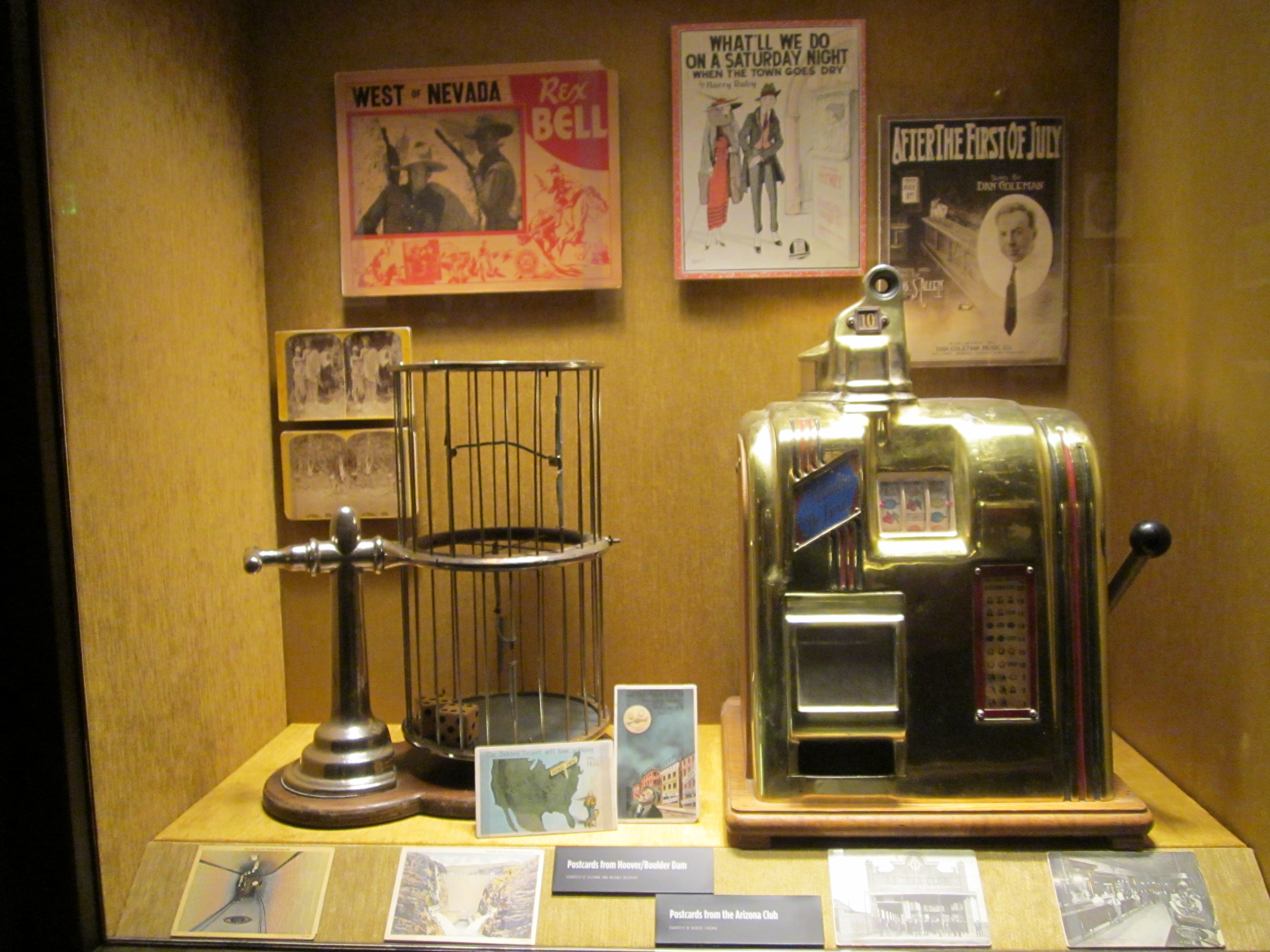
Mob Museum exhibit showing an early slot machine

The centerpiece of the Mob Museum is the second floor courtroom, which was the location of one of fourteen national Kefauver Committee hearings to expose organized crime held in 1950 and 1951. The museum also acquired the brick wall where the Saint Valentine's Day Massacre took place. Other exhibits focus on Mob violence, casino revenue skimming operations, and wiretapping by law enforcement. In 2018, a new exhibit called Organized Crime Today was added to the first floor following a major renovation.

The self-guided tour commences on the third floor where the actual wall of the St. Valentine's Day Massacre is on display, accessible by elevator or stairs, and winds its way down to the second and first floors. Visitors can watch a film about the history of Organized Crime (beginning around the time of the passing of Prohibition). The main part of the exhibition consists of Mob-related photos with captions explaining the significance of the particular images, but also what individuals/events to which they were connected.

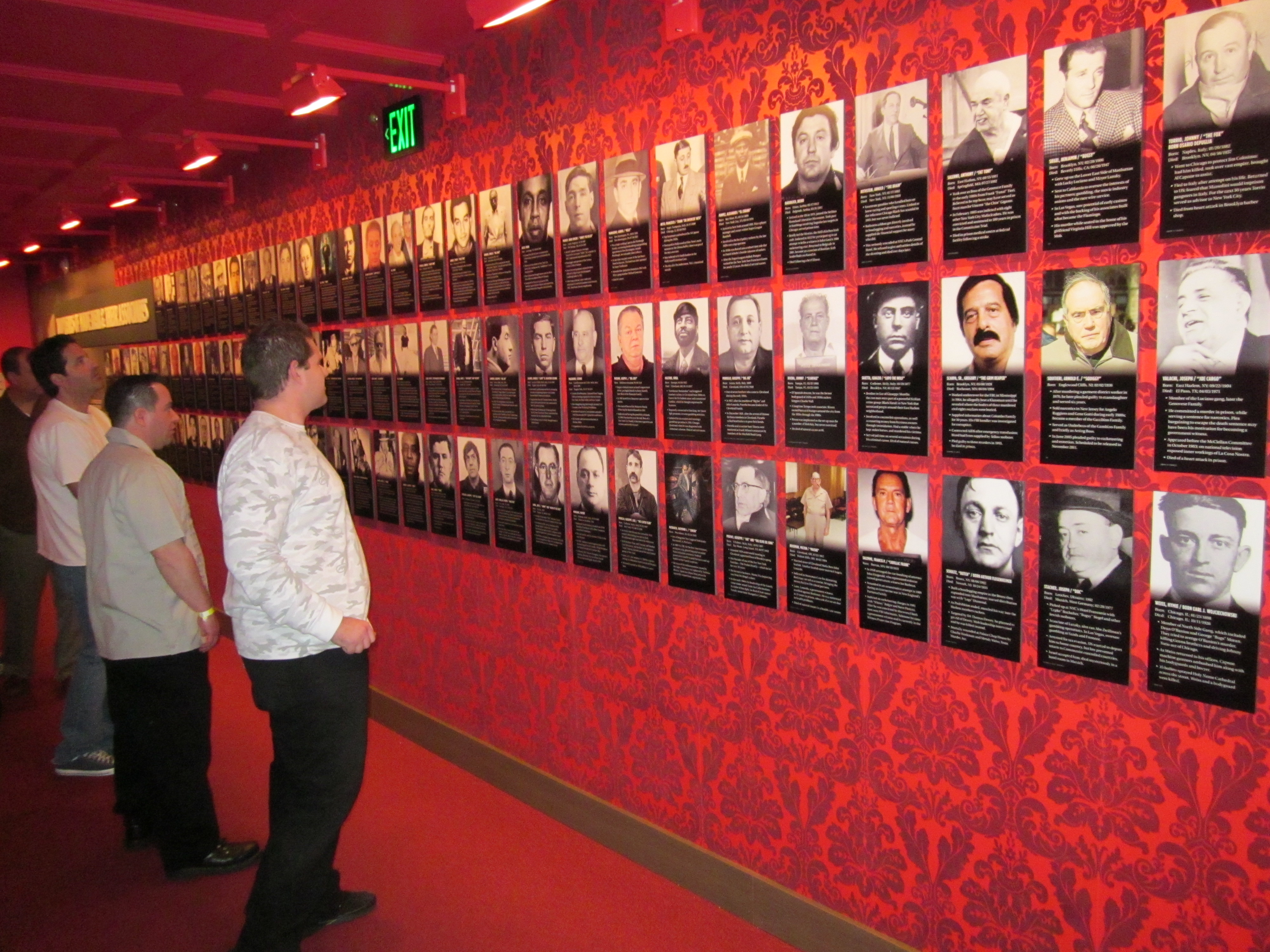
Wall of Mobsters

The museum offers a wide array of thematically oriented sections addressing the Mob's involvement in illegal activities such as gambling, drugs, prostitution or bootlegging and the efforts of law enforcement to counteract and eliminate those criminal operations. Additionally the visitor is able to view some uniquely disturbing, otherwise rarely accessible material, for example the photographs of victims of the most famous murders credited to the Mafia (appropriately named "Mob's Greatest Hits"; these are quite graphic in nature, because they show the actual corpses of the deceased), as well as pictures and short biographies of the most popular and notorious gangster personalities. A special Wall located near the exit depicts images of all the actors who portrayed well-known Mobsters in movies or series. A significant number of exhibits are interactive; there are also several stations situated throughout the museum, where relevant film footage is played on a loop.

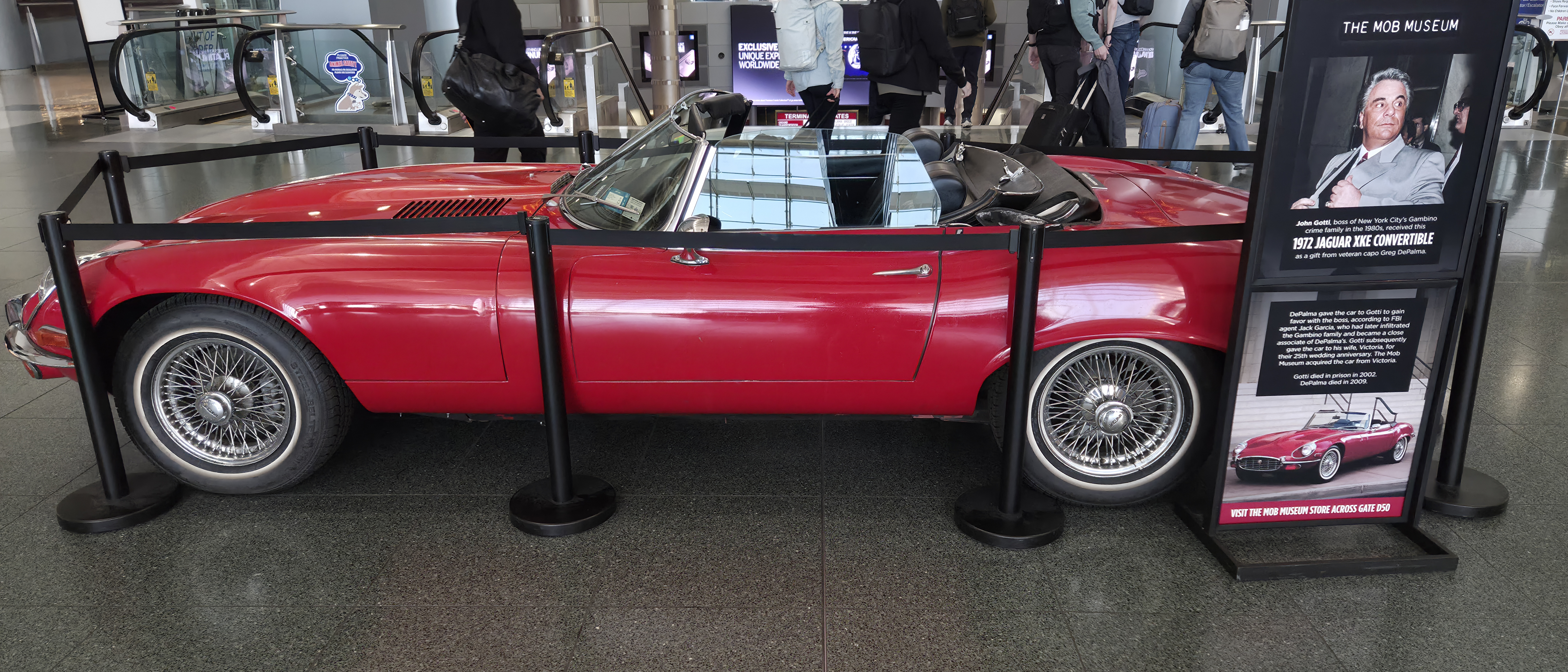
John Gotti's 1972 Jaguar XKE gifted to him by Greg DePalma, on display by the Mob Museum in Terminal D at Harry Reid International Airport

There is a gift shop on the first floor. Using photos, text, displays, interactive techniques, hands-on exhibits, and other first-class museum methods, the visitor learns about the history of organized crime, Prohibition and the business opportunity it provided. Visitors learn about Las Vegas' first casinos, Howard Hughes, J. Edgar Hoover, the origins of the FBI, Al Capone, Eliot Ness, and much more. A visitor can sit in a replica electric chair, listen to actual wire taps, train in a use of force training simulator and explore an interactive crime lab exhibit related to forensic science.

In April 2018, the museum opened a fully operational speakeasy and distillery in their basement exhibit, The Underground. The space features exhibits related to the cultural history of the Prohibition era as well as the bootleggers, rumrunners, and moonshiners who ensured Americans still had access to liquor during the 13 years of federal Prohibition. The museum distills its own 100 proof, 100% corn moonshine in a custom-built pot still located in the Underground. In 2019, the Mob Museum began selling its moonshine through Lee's Discount Liquor stores in the Las Vegas Valley. The museum's moonshine had previously only been available at The Underground.

== Notable mobsters ==
Mobsters who operated in casinos
Name	Family	Rank	Casino
Meyer Lansky	Genovese crime family	Associate	Flamingo Hotel and Riviera
Bugsy Siegel	Genovese crime family	Associate	Flamingo Hotel
Frank Costello	Genovese crime family	Boss	Tropicana (Investor)
Vincent Alo	Genovese crime family	Capo	Desert Inn
Moe Sedway	Genovese crime family	Associate	El Cortez and Flamingo Hotel
Joseph Stacher	Genovese crime family	Associate	Sands and Fremont
Marshall Caifano	Chicago Outfit	Soldier	
Anthony Spilotro	Chicago Outfit	Soldier	Stardust
Frank Cullotta	Chicago Outfit	Associate	Stardust
Frank Rosenthal	Chicago Outfit	Associate	Stardust, Fremont, Marina and Hacienda
Michael Spilotro	Chicago Outfit	Associate	Stardust
Gus Greenbaum	Chicago Outfit	Associate	El Cortez, Flamingo Hotel and Riviera
Herbert Blitzstein	Chicago Outfit	Associate	Binion's
Raymond Patriarca	Patriarca crime family	Boss	The Dunes (Investor)
Anthony Joseph Zerilli	Detroit Partnership	Underboss	New Frontier
Moe Dalitz	Cleveland crime family	Associate	Desert Inn, Castaways, Stardust and Sundance Hotel Casino
Anthony Cornero	Los Angeles crime family	Associate	Stardust
Peter Simone	Kansas City crime family	Associate	Harrah's
Charles Panarella	Colombo crime family	Soldier	Westin Las Vegas
