= Glen Jones =

American law enforcement officer (1910–1983)

- Born: Glen C. Jones; July 15, 1910; Overton, Nevada, U.S.
- Died: September 9, 1983 (aged 73); Las Vegas, Nevada, U.S.
- Resting place: Woodlawn Cemetery
- Occupation: Sheriff
- Political party: Democratic

Glen C. Jones (July 15, 1910 – September 9, 1983) was an American law enforcement officer from Nevada. He served as sheriff of Clark County from 1942 to 1955.

== Early life ==
Glen C. Jones was born on July 15, 1910, in Overton, Nevada, to Albert L. Jones. His father was county commissioner.

== Career ==
Jones moved to Las Vegas in 1928. He joined the Clark County fire and police departments when they were formed in 1935. In 1938, he joined the sheriff's department and was appointed undersheriff in 1939. He held that role until his election as sheriff of Clark County in 1942. He served as sheriff until 1955 when he was defeated by Butch Leypoldt. His defeat is discussed in Chapter VI of The Green Felt Jungle (1963) by Ed Reid and Ovid Demaris. Jones was the founder of the Sheriff's Posse and the Aero Squadron.

Jones was a Democrat. He ran for Nevada State Assembly in 1966, but lost. He also ran unsuccessfully for North Las Vegas City Council in 1975. In 1973, he sought gambling licenses at the 101 Club in North Las Vegas.

== Personal life ==
Jones married Rebecca Gentry of St. Thomas in 1929.

Jones died of a cerebral hemorrhage on September 9, 1983, aged 73. He was buried in Woodlawn Cemetery.
