= Ed Becker =

American businessman and author (died 2007)

- Died: 2007
- Occupations: Promoter, businessman, private investigator, author
- Writing career
- Genre: True crime

Ed Becker (died 2007) was a Las Vegas promoter, businessman, private investigator and author.

== Biography ==
He was the entertainment director at the Riviera Hotel and Casino under Gus Greenbaum at Las Vegas. In 1956 he met singer Frank Sinatra through a cousin of Sinatra's, they became friends. In the 1960s he began to work part-time for private investigator Julian Blodgett, a former FBI agent. He later founded his own investigative firm, Ed Becker Associates.

Becker was hired as a researcher for Ed Reid's book The Grim Reapers: The Anatomy of Organized Crime in America (1970). He came to know Reid through their mutual friend Hank Greenspun, the publisher of the Las Vegas Sun. By the 1970s he was involved in business with Jerris Leonard. He co-authored with the journalist Charles Rappleye All-American Mafiosi: The Johnny Roselli Story, published in 1991 by Doubleday. Becker had known Roselli personally from his days in Las Vegas. He was introduced to Sidney Korshak through him.

He was one of a plethora of people interviewed for the book Casino: Love and Honor in Las Vegas (1995) by Nicholas Pileggi, later adapted into the film Casino by Martin Scorsese. He contributed the afterword to a 2000 Barricade Books edition of Hickman Powell's 1939 biography of Lucky Luciano, Lucky Luciano: The Man Who Organized Crime in America (original title: Ninety Times Guilty).

Becker is known for his allegations related to the assassination of John F. Kennedy. Becker claimed that he visited Marcello at his farmhouse in Louisiana in September 1962 to discuss an oil deal and after they began drinking whiskey, in the presence of himself and two Marcello associates, Marcello described his intent to assassinate the President. According to Becker, Marcello shouted the Sicilian curse "Take that stone out of my shoe!" and went on to explain "Don't worry about that Bobby son-of-a-bitch. He's going to be taken care of", elaborating that "the dog will keep biting you if you only cut off its tail", which implied that President Kennedy would be assassinated in order to get the Attorney General Bobby Kennedy off the mafia's back. He added that Marcello told him they would get a "nut" to do it so that it could not be traced back to them. According to Becker he informed the FBI of this at that the time, but the FBI denied it had any records indicating such a thing. He repeated his allegation under oath when he was brought in to testify before the HSCA. He repeated the allegation in 1988 on The Kwitny Report. When Marcello testified before the HSCA he rejected Becker's allegation, denying any such meeting took place. Becker's claim was first reported on in Ed Reid's book The Grim Reapers: The Anatomy of Organized Crime in America (1970). The FBI found out about the book and its contents in 1967. FBI agent George Bland subsequently paid Reid a visit, describing Becker as a "liar and a cheat". The FBI were unsuccessful in convincing Reid to drop the allegation from his book, although he did remove mention of Becker having reported the incident to the FBI. In 1992 Becker's employer at the time of the alleged incident, former FBI man Julian Blodgett, stated that two days later Becker informed him about it, and that he passed on the information to his contacts in the FBI Los Angeles bureau.

Becker died in 2007.

== Authored works ==
- (with Charles Rappleye) All American Mafioso: The Johnny Rosselli Story. Barricade Books. 1995. ISBN 978-1-56980-027-0.
- Afterword to Powell, Hickman (2000). Lucky Luciano: The Man Who Organized Crime in America. Barricade Books.
