= Vincent Alo =

American mobster (1904–2001)

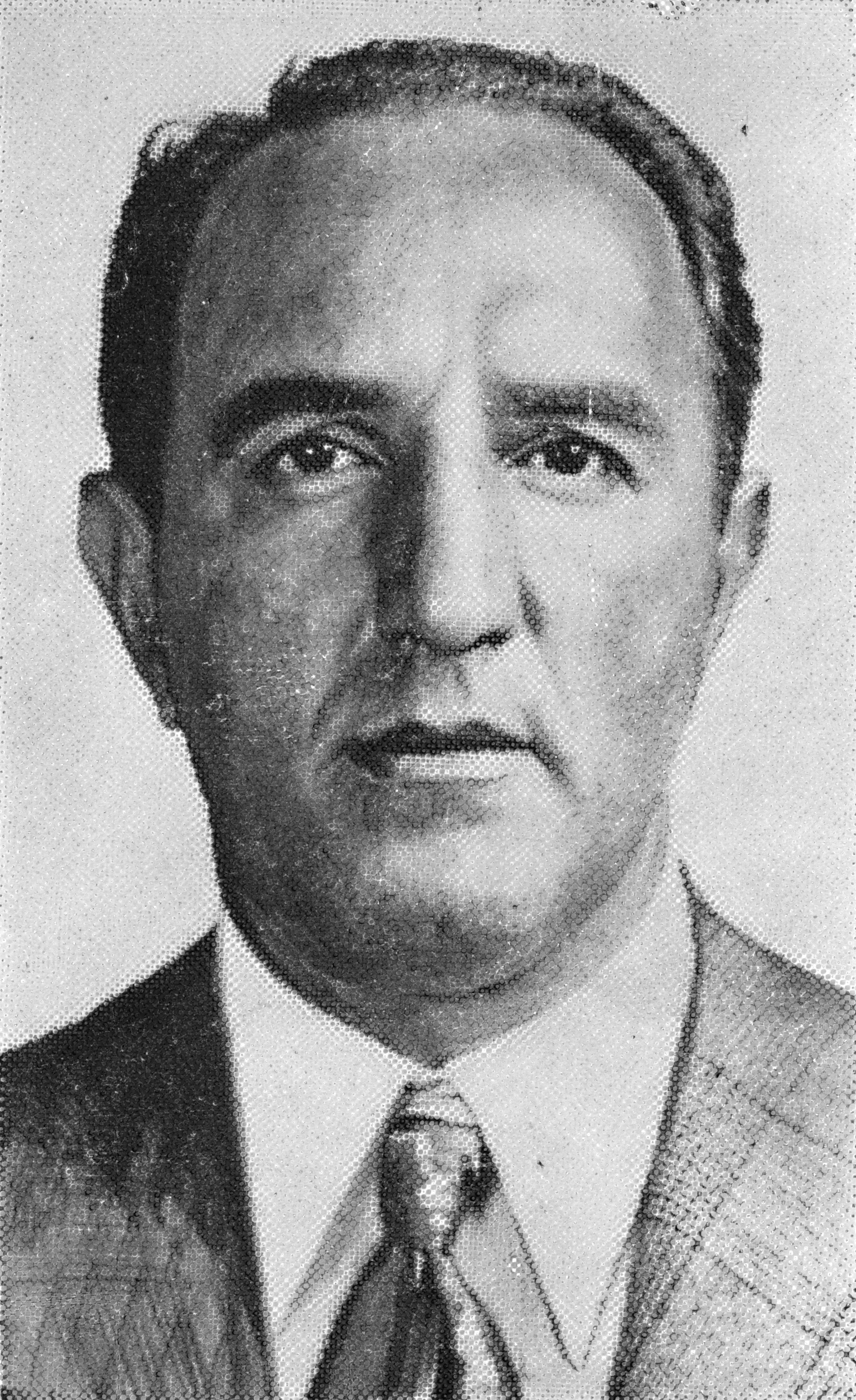
- Alo in 1950
- Born: May 26, 1904; Harlem, New York City, U.S.
- Died: March 9, 2001 (aged 96); Florida, U.S.
- Other name: Jimmy Blue Eyes

Vincent "Jimmy Blue Eyes" Alo (May 26, 1904 – March 9, 2001) was a New York mobster and a high-ranking capo in the Genovese crime family who set up casino operations with mob associate Meyer Lansky in Florida and Cuba.

== Early years ==
Born in Harlem, Alo started working on Wall Street at age 14. As a young man, Alo was convicted of armed robbery and sent to either Sing Sing or Dannemora state prison.

In 1926, Alo became a made man, or full member, of Joseph "Joe the Boss" Masseria's powerful New York gang. Named a caporegime of the old Joe Adonis crew, Alo oversaw clubs, speakeasys, and illegal gambling in Brooklyn.

== Partnership with Lansky ==
In 1929, Lucky Luciano, one of Masseria's lieutenants, introduced Alo to Meyer Lansky. An old friend of Luciano's, Lansky was a valuable money-maker for Masseria's organization and Luciano wanted Alo to guard him. Luciano may have wanted Alo to also monitor Lansky (a claim reinforced in Vincent Teresa's My Life In the Mafia and The Last Mafioso by Ovid Demaris). However, the majority of crime historians view this as unlikely, as Lansky was at this time the head of a gang independent of Masseria and Luciano called the Bugs and Meyer mob, which made much of their income through extortion and was one of the most violent gangs of the era. Alo is described as a junior partner in Lansky's operations in virtually all sources, if mentioned at all. Both Lansky and Alo were introverted, bookish men who wanted to become legitimate businessmen. The two mobsters quickly became friends.

When Alo first met Lansky, Alo was involved in a setting up a casino in the town of Hallandale, Florida (now called Hallandale Beach). Immediately realizing that Alo would be perfect for this venture, Meyer invited him to become a partner. When Lansky and Alo arrived in Florida, they immediately started making contributions to local fraternal organizations and secret payments to politicians and law enforcement.

When they opened their first casino in Hallandale, Alo and Lansky faced no government or public opposition. Business was so good in the first casino that Alo and Lansky soon opened a second one in Hallandale. This cooperative relationship between the town and the mob would continue uninterrupted until 1947. As the town's economy became more diversified, public embarrassment about the illegal gambling increased. At that point, Alo and Lansky closed their two Hallandale casinos and started planning for casinos in Cuba.

== Later years ==
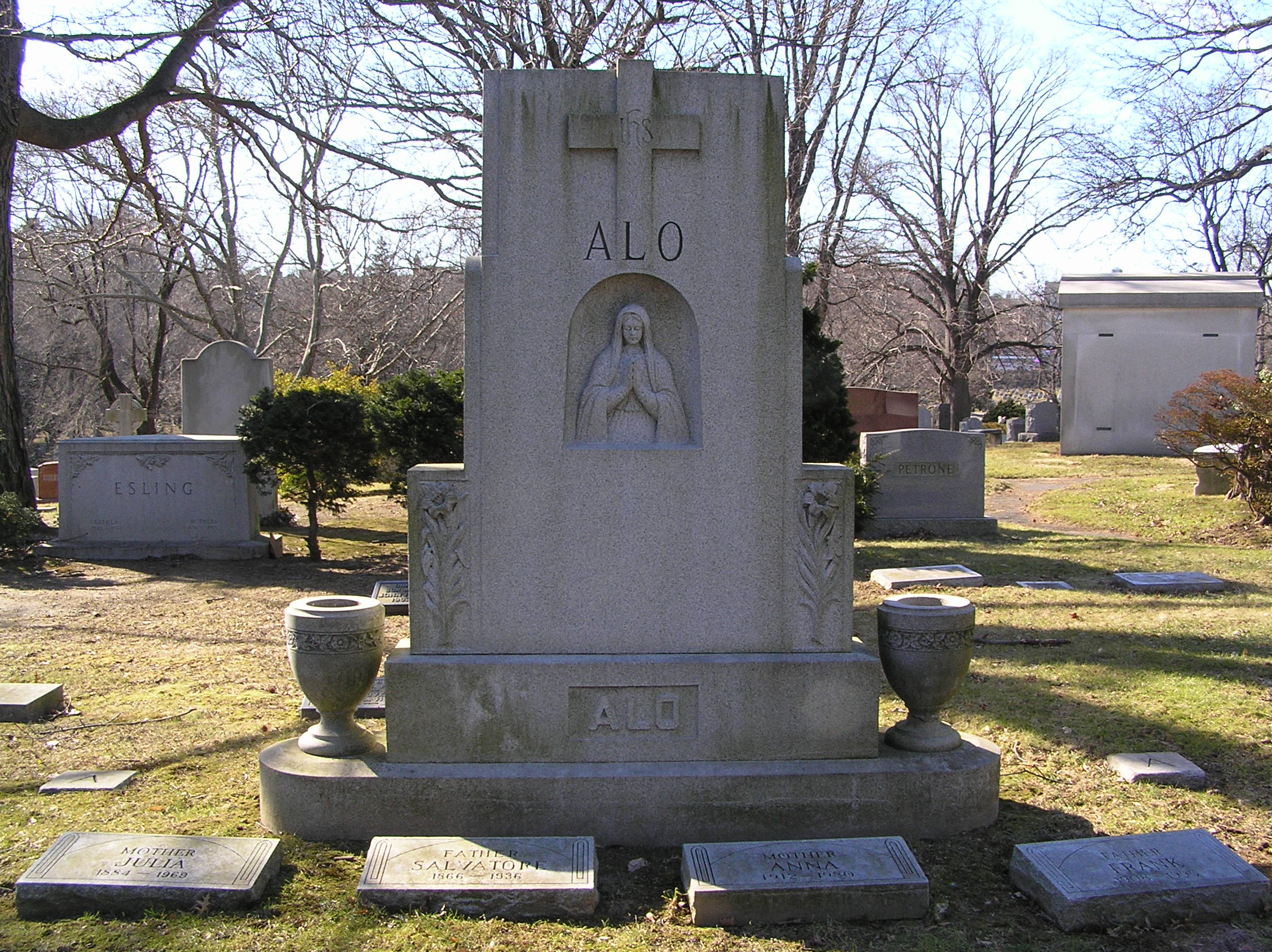
The grave of Vincent Alo in Woodlawn Cemetery

In 1970, Alo was convicted of obstructing justice. Robert M. Morgenthau, U.S. District Attorney for the Southern District of New York, stated that "Alo is one of the most significant organized crime figures in the United States. He is closely associated with Meyer Lansky of Miami, who is at the apex of organized crime." Alo was described as being charming, intelligent and well liked by his associates. He retired in the mid-1970s and his crew was taken over by Matthew Ianniello.

On March 9, 2001, Alo died of natural causes in Florida at age 96. His remains were interred in Woodlawn Cemetery in the Bronx.

== In popular culture ==
The character Johnny Ola, portrayed by Dominic Chianese, in the film The Godfather Part II (1974) is based on Alo. The character Victor Tellegio, portrayed by Robert De Niro in the film American Hustle (2013) is based on Alo, as well.

He also provided the story of Prohibition-era bootlegging to Drew Struzan's wife Dylan, who published it as the 2019 nonfiction narrative book A Bloody Business.

He is mentioned early in the 2019 Martin Scorsese film The Irishman by Frank Sheeran, also played by De Niro.
