= The Green Felt Jungle =

1963 nonfiction book

- First edition
- Author: Ovid Demaris and Ed Reid
- Language: English
- Publisher: Trident Press
- Publication date: January 1, 1963
- Publication place: United States
- Media type: Print, e-book

The Green Felt Jungle is a 1963 book by Ovid Demaris and Ed Reid. It exposes Las Vegas's dark underbelly, discussing the role of mobsters, prostitution, and political influence peddling in control of the city. It was a New York Times Best Seller for 23 weeks.

Benjamin "Bugsy" Siegel, Gus Greenbaum and Benny Binion are among the well-known characters who make an appearance in The Green Felt Jungle. An important contribution to the early history of the Las Vegas, the book documents a time prior to the transition from gangster control of the city to its clean-up, and purchase of the casinos by legitimate companies.
