= Artillery (magazine) =

- Categories: contemporary art magazine
- Founder: Tulsa Kinney; Charles Rappleye
- Founded: 2006
- First issue: 2006
- Country: America
- Based in: Los Angeles
- Language: English
- Website: artillerymag.com

Artillery is an American contemporary art magazine based in Los Angeles. Features and exhibition reviews are often L.A.-centric yet increasingly dedicated to coverage of the arts worldwide, with contributors based in New York, San Francisco, Dallas, Berlin, and London. The bi-monthly publication is available in both print and web editions. The print version is distributed and for sale via subscription and can also be found in bookstores, museum shops, art galleries, and other locations. Print circulation is currently at about 50,000, with a readership of about 35,000. Artillery also hosts public events such as live debates, poetry readings, and book signings in major cities as well as at art fairs.

== History and profile ==
Artillery was co-founded in 2006 by former LA Weekly editorial staff members Tulsa Kinney and Charles Rappleye as an alternative to "the stodgy, art-mag paradigm"—as editor-in-chief, Kinney put it in the inaugural issue—slyly referencing the often academic "artspeak" generated by gallery press releases and prevalent in widely circulated arts publications such as Art in America and Artforum.

To date, the single most widely read Artillery feature article, published in January 2011, turned out to be the last interview conducted with international art star Mike Kelley before the artist committed suicide that same month. The feature, written by Kinney, revealed the depths of the artist's depression and his apparent disenchantment with the commercial art world.

Artillery is notable for its interviews and reviews of artists, including artists Njideka Akunyili Crosby, Kehinde Wiley, Jim Shaw, Elliott Hundley, Barbara Kruger, Amadour, Joan Didion, Lita Albuquerque, Francesca Woodman, William Kentridge, Tala Madani, Catherine Opie, Wolfgang Tillmans, and Abraham Cruzvillegas.
