= Machine Gun McCain =

1969 crime film by Giuliano Montaldo

- Italian film poster
- Italian: Gli intoccabili
- Directed by: Giuliano Montaldo
- Screenplay by: Mino Roli; Giuliano Montaldo; Israel Horovitz
- Story by: Mino Roli
- Based on: Candyleg by Ovid Demaris
- Produced by: Marco Vicario; Bino Cicogna
- Starring: John Cassavetes; Britt Ekland; Peter Falk; Gabriele Ferzetti; Florinda Bolkan; Salvo Randone; Gena Rowlands
- Cinematography: Erico Menczer
- Edited by: Franco Fraticelli
- Music by: Ennio Morricone
- Production company: Euroatlantica
- Distributed by: Euro International Film (Italy)
- Release date: 1 April 1969 (Italy)
- Running time: 116 minutes
- Country: Italy
- Language: English
- Box office: ₤803,751 million

Machine Gun McCain (Italian: Gli intoccabili, lit. 'The Untouchables') is a 1969 English-language Italian crime film directed by Giuliano Montaldo and starring John Cassavetes, Britt Ekland, Peter Falk, Gabriele Ferzetti, and Florinda Bolkan. Cassavetes' spouse and regular collaborator Gena Rowlands appears in a supporting role. The film is based on the Ovid Demaris novel Candyleg, adapted by Montaldo, Mino Roli, and American playwright Israel Horovitz. It premiered at the 1969 Cannes Film Festival, where it was nominated for the Palme d'Or.

== Plot ==
Charlie Adamo, the Mafia's recently promoted operations chief on the West Coast of the United States, attempts to muscle in on the newly constructed Royal Casino-Hotel in Las Vegas, demanding its manager Abe Stilberman sell him a 20% stake in the enterprise. When Stilberman refuses, Adamo arranges for convicted bank robber Hank McCain to be released from prison by his son Jack, who poses a plan to rob the casino without telling him of Adamo's involvement. McCain is interested, but he is wary of his son's obvious naivete and suspects more is happening than he's being told. Nonetheless, McCain begins casing the Royal, picking up and marrying an eager young woman named Irene along the way.

Unbeknownst to Adamo, the Royal is owned by the Mafia. His superior, Don Francesco, demands he cease any attempt to buy a stake, and Adamo orders the heist called off immediately. However, McCain is determined to see it through and ignores his son's calls. Eventually, he agrees to meet him in a remote warehouse, where he points out that Jack's two cohorts (working for Adamo) plan to kill them both. McCain manages to kill them instead, but not before his son dies in the crossfire.

McCain carries out his plan, setting off time bombs throughout the casino, detonating a second explosion outside town to distract authorities, and disguising himself as a firefighter to rob the safe while the building is evacuated. The plan goes off without a hitch, but Don Francesco learns of Adamo's involvement through the machinations of his wife. He tortures McCain and Irene's identities out of Adamo before having him killed.

McCain and Irene are now on the run, with the Mafia distributing photographs of the two among their network of informants. With nowhere left to turn, McCain goes to his old lover and partner-in-crime Rosemary Scott. She arranges their safe passage out of the country, but she is found out and captured by Francesco's men. She kills herself before she can be tortured for information.

Irene is spotted by an informant and captured. Francesco's men take her to McCain's awaiting boat, where they kill her. Enraged, McCain blindly fires at his assailants, but he is unceremoniously shot and killed. His and Irene's bodies are quietly disposed.

== Cast ==
- John Cassavetes as Hank McCain
- Britt Ekland as Irene Tucker
- Peter Falk as Charlie Adamo
- Gabriele Ferzetti as Don Francesco DeMarco
- Pierluigi Aprà as Jack McCain
- Luigi Pistilli as Duke Mazzanga
- Florinda Bolkan as Joni Adamo
- Gena Rowlands as Rosemary Scott
- Salvo Randone as Don Salvatore
- Steffen Zacharias as Abe Stilberman
- Tony Kendall as Pete Zacari
- Val Avery as Chuck Regan
- Margherita Guzzinati as Margaret DeMarco
- Claudio Biava as Barclay
- James Morrison as Joby Cuda
- Dennis Sallas as Fred Tecosky
- Jack Ackerman as Britten

== Production ==
Giuliano Montaldo stated that both Machine Gun McCain and his previous film Grand Slam were purely commercial projects made to establish himself in the film industry before making what he wanted to make. Montaldo stated that John Cassavetes also only took the title role to finance his own films.

The film was the first collaboration between Cassavetes and Peter Falk, preceding their more well-known pairings in Husbands and A Woman Under the Influence. Gena Rowlands and Val Avery, two other regulars of Cassavetes' ensemble, also appeared in the film.

=== Filming ===
Filming took place on-location in Las Vegas, San Francisco, Los Angeles, and New York City. The interiors were filmed at De Paolis and Dear Studios in Rome. Future Oscar-winning producer Gray Frederickson served as the film's U.S. production manager.

== Reception ==
In a contemporary review, the Monthly Film Bulletin described the film as "executed with minimal flair, and thudding rather heavily on the moralist/social documentary side of the fence" and that "apart from an over-use of the Techniscope zoom lens, there's no style to speak of."

In a contemporary review of Blu-ray from the Blue Underground, Tom Charity described the film as "haphazardly scripted" but noted that it is "Cassavetes' participation alongside his soon-to be regular collaborator Falk and his wife Gena Rowlands that piques our curiosity" and that "Adroitly mixing stylish Roman interiors with colourful location work, fast-paced and featuring a ridiculously snappy Ennio Morricone dirge, The Ballad of Hank McCain...adds up to an attractive footnote to Cassavetes' career".

== Notes ==
=== References ===
- Curti, Roberto (2013). Italian Crime Filmography, 1968-1980. McFarland. ISBN 978-0-7864-6976-5.
