= The Case Against Brooklyn =

1958 film

- Original film poster
- Directed by: Paul Wendkos
- Screenplay by: Raymond T. Marcus; Daniel B. Ullman
- Story by: Daniel B. Ullman
- Based on: "I Broke the Brooklyn Graft Scandal" by Ed Reid
- Produced by: Charles H. Schneer
- Starring: Darren McGavin; Margaret Hayes
- Cinematography: Fred Jackman, Jr.
- Edited by: Edwin H. Bryant
- Production company: Morningside Productions
- Distributed by: Columbia Pictures
- Release date: June 1958
- Running time: 81 minutes
- Country: United States
- Language: English

The Case Against Brooklyn is a 1958 film noir crime film directed by Paul Wendkos, starring Darren McGavin and Margaret Hayes, and based on the True Magazine article "I Broke the Brooklyn Graft Scandal" by crime reporter Ed Reid. The film features depictions of American police corruption, though no police officer in uniform is shown to be corrupt.

== Plot ==
In an attempt to combat police corruption, newly graduated rookie cops are recruited to serve undercover to find information on a complex illegal betting network in Brooklyn. One of these officers, ex-Marine Pete Harris, formerly with Military Intelligence in Japan, is tasked to make the acquaintance of a woman whose husband was recently murdered by the Mob over gambling debts.

== Cast ==
- Darren McGavin as Pete Harris
- Margaret Hayes as Lil Polombo née Alexander (as Maggie Hayes)
- Warren Stevens as Rudi Franklin
- Peggy McCay as Mrs. Jane Harris
- Tol Avery as Dist. Atty. Michael W. Norris
- Emile Meyer as Police Capt. T.W. Wills
- Nestor Paiva as Finelli
- Brian G. Hutton as Jess Johnson (as Brian Hutton)
- Robert Osterloh as Det. Sgt. Bonney
- Joe Turkel as Henchman Monte
- Bobby Helms as Himself - Vocalist
