= Charles Rappleye =

American writer and editor (1956–2018)

- Born: January 22, 1956
- Died: September 15, 2018 (aged 62)
- Occupations: Writer, editor
- Spouse: Tulsa Kinney

Charles (McMillan) Rappleye (January 22, 1956 – September 15, 2018) was an American writer, investigative reporter and newspaper editor.

== Life ==
Rappleye was born in Texas in 1956, growing up in Cambridge, Massachusetts. He had a brother Bill who became a reporter for NBC 10 News. In 1978 he graduated from the University of Wisconsin with a major in economics. He later moved to California, where he became editor of the Santa Barbara News & Review. In 1988 he earned a master’s degree in professional writing from the University of Southern California.

His work appeared in Virginia Quarterly Review, American Journalism Review, Columbia Journalism Review, LA Weekly, LA CityBeat, and OC Weekly.

He co-authored with Ed Becker All-American Mafiosi: The Johnny Roselli Story, published in 1991 by Doubleday. From 1994 to 2003 he worked for L.A. Weekly as a news editor, reporter and writer. He played a role in the exposure of the Rampart scandal. In 2006 he was the co-founder, along with his wife Tulsa Kinney, of the art magazine Artillery.

After a six year battle with cancer Rappleye died at his home in Echo Park. He had been working on a book about US President Zachary Taylor.

== Awards ==
- 2006 best book by the New York City American Revolutionary War Round Table.
- 2007 George Washington Book Prize.

== Works ==
- Rappleye, Charles. Herbert Hoover In The White House. New-York, NY: Simon & Schuster, 2016. ISBN 978-1-4516-4868-3.
- Rappleye, Charles. Robert Morris: Financier of the American Revolution. New York: Simon & Schuster, 2010. ISBN 978-1-4165-7091-2.
- Sons of Providence: The Brown Brothers, the Slave Trade, and the American Revolution. Simon & Schuster. 2006. ISBN 978-0-7432-6688-8.
- Charles Rappleye; Ed Becker (1995). All American Mafioso: The Johnny Rosselli Story. Barricade Books. ISBN 978-1-56980-027-0.
