= Ed Reid =

American investigative journalist

Ed Reid (1914 - 1988) was an American author and investigative journalist who exposed organized crime in New York City and Las Vegas.

== Early life ==
Reid was born in Manhattan and grew up in Brooklyn. Reid started as a reporter in 1935 and used his writing to fight corruption.

== Career ==
An eight-part series starting in 1949 exposed the activities of bookmaker Harry Gross and corrupt members of the New York City Police Department. This exposé led to an investigation by Brooklyn District Attorney Miles McDonald, and resulted in the eventual resignation of Mayor of New York City William O'Dwyer. His article in True Magazine I Broke the Brooklyn Graft Scandal was the basis for the 1958 movie The Case Against Brooklyn.

In the 1950s and early 1960s, Reid worked at the Las Vegas Sun. His investigative reporting exposed the hidden ownership interest of mobsters Jake and Meyer Lansky in the Thunderbird Hotel. On one occasion in March 1954 Reid was beaten by two men in Las Vegas when he was investigating criminal infiltration there. Reid, with Ovid Demaris, co-authored The Green Felt Jungle, a New York Times Best Seller for 23 weeks in 1964, that exposed greed and depravity in Las Vegas. The book connected then Senator Barry Goldwater to labor racketeer Willy Bioff. Goldwater threatened a libel suit against the publisher. Reid and Demaris were invited to join a panel on David Susskind's show "Open End" for a discussion of organized crime. Reid was dismissed from the Las Vegas Sun by publisher Hank Greenspun after he wrote The Green Felt Jungle.

In 1970 he published The Grim Reapers: The Anatomy of Organized Crime in America, hiring Ed Becker as a researcher to aid his work. He came to know Becker through their mutual friend Hank Greenspun, the publisher of the Las Vegas Sun. The book was the first to publicize Becker's allegation that in Louisiana, September 1962, New Orleans crime boss Carlos Marcello, in an outburst as they were drinking whiskey, stated his intention to Becker that he would lay the blame on a "nut" in an assassination plot against President John F. Kennedy. The FBI found out about the book and its contents in 1967. FBI agent George Bland subsequently paid Reid a visit, describing Becker as a "liar and a cheat". The FBI were unsuccessful in convincing Reid to drop the allegation from his book, although he did remove mention of Becker having reported the incident to the FBI.

== Recognition ==
In October 1950 Reid received the first ever annual By-Line Award of the Newspaper Reporters Association of New York City for excellence in local reporting. It was presented to him by president of the association Alfred Clark at the Roosevelt Hotel. A series of articles he penned on gambling in Brooklyn earned him the award. Reid reporting for the Brooklyn Eagle earned the outlet the public service 1951 Pulitzer Prize.

== Family ==
Reid was married to Natalie (Borokhovich) Reid, a fashion model, and had two children. They divorced in 1963. In 1964, he married Nancy Hagen, then a feature columnist for Parade Magazine.

== Works ==
- Mafia. Random House. 1952.
- The Shame of New York. Random House. 1953.
- Las Vegas: City Without Clocks. Prentice-Hall. 1961.
- (with Ovid Demaris) The Green Felt Jungle. Trident Press. 1963.
- The Grim Reapers: The Anatomy of Organized Crime in America. Bantam. 1970.
- The Mistress and the Mafia (The Virginia Hill Story). Bantam. 1972.
- Mickey Cohen: Mobster. Pinnacle Books. 1973.
