= El Cortez (Las Vegas) =

Hotel and casino in Las Vegas, Nevada, United States

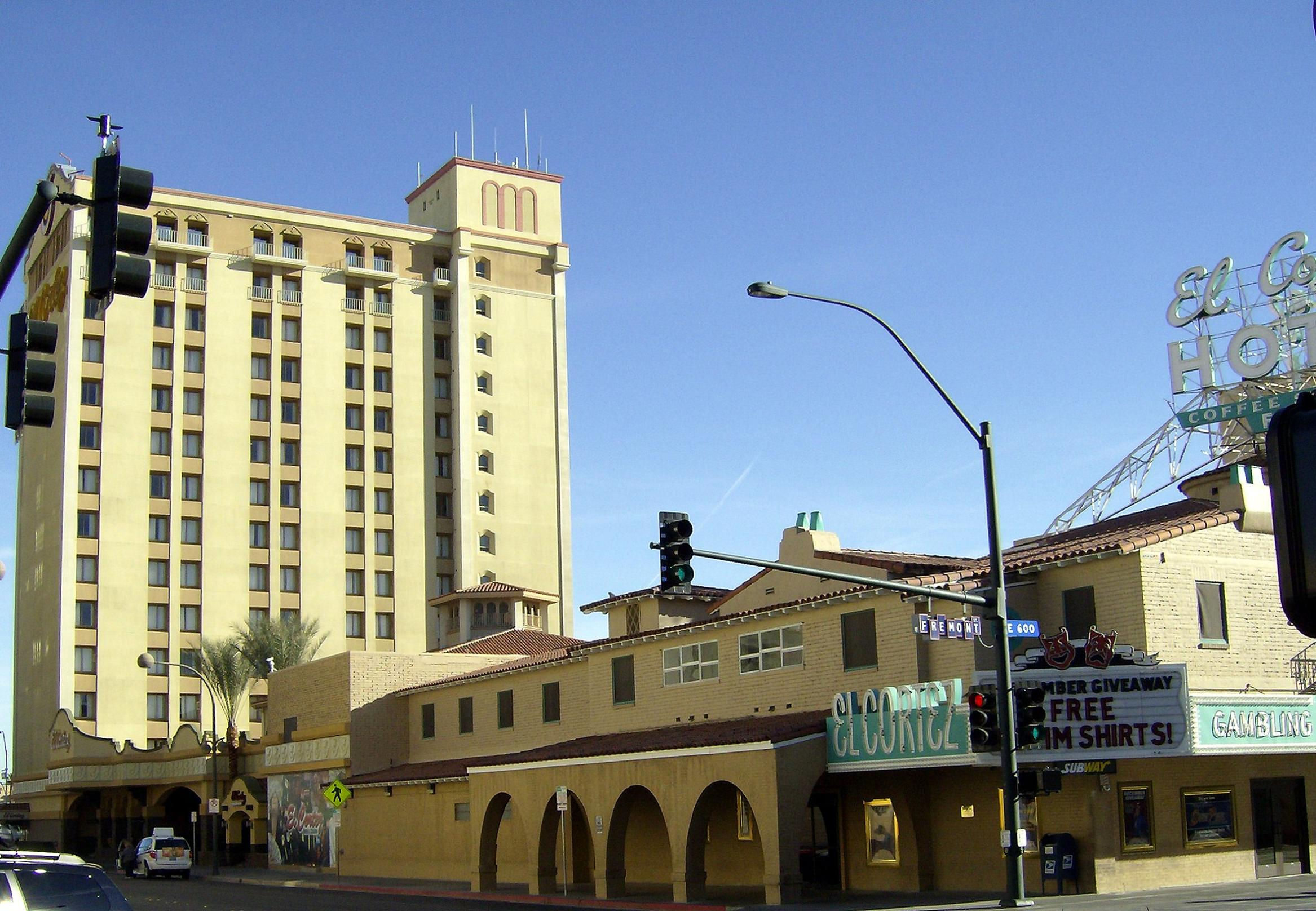
- Interactive map of El Cortez
- Location: Las Vegas, Nevada 89101; 600 East Fremont Street
- Opened: November 7, 1941; 84 years ago
- Theme: Western
- No. of rooms: 364
- Gaming space: 41,842 sq ft (3,887.2 m^{2})
- Notable restaurants: Siegel's 1941
- Casino type: Land
- Owner: Kenny Epstein
- Renovated in: 1952, 1963, 1980, 2006, 2009, 2019, 2024
- Website: www.elcortezhotelcasino.com
- El Cortez
- U.S. National Register of Historic Places
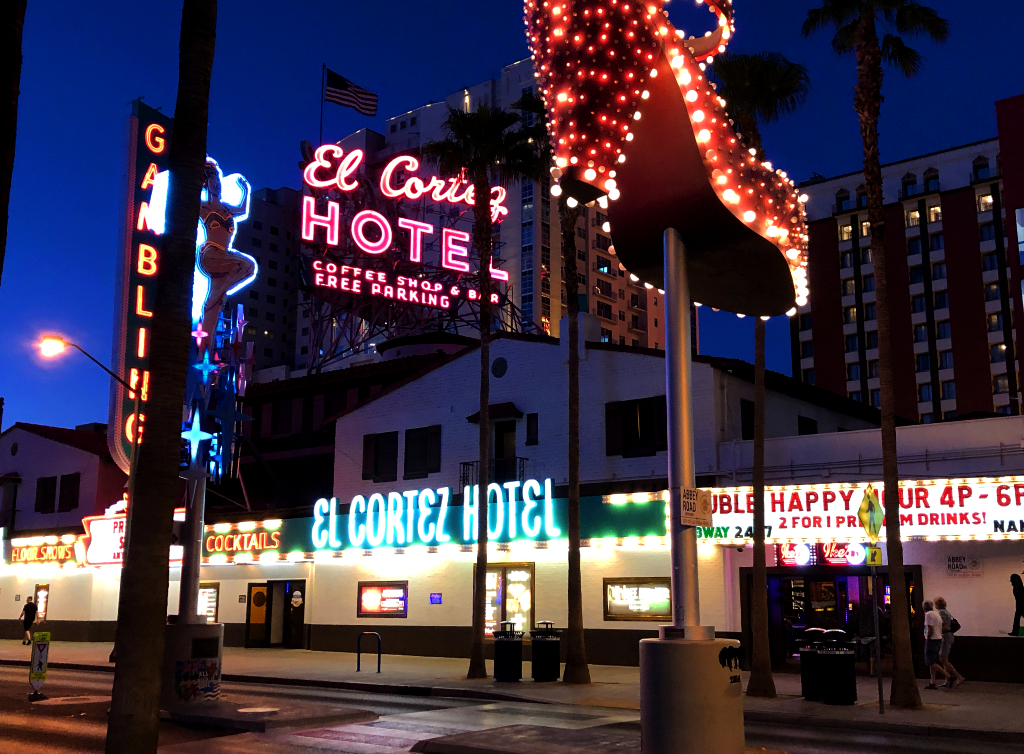

- Location within Downtown Las Vegas Location within Nevada Location within the United States
- Coordinates: 36°10′9.7284″N 115°08′19.0602″W
- Built: 1941
- Architectural style: Spanish Colonial Revival
- Visitation: 3 million (2016)
- NRHP reference No.: 13000010
- Added to NRHP: 2013

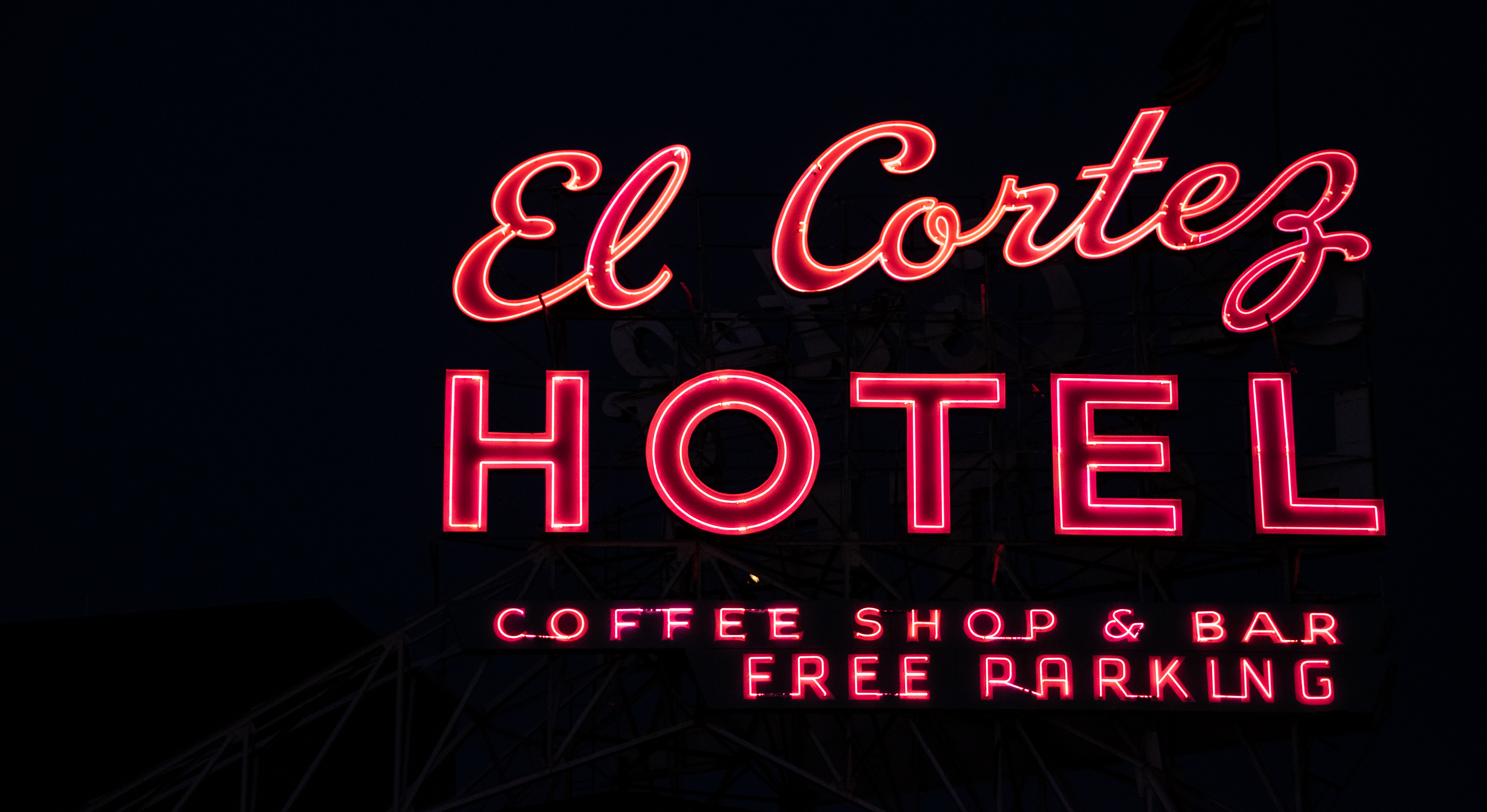
El Cortez sign on East Fremont Street

El Cortez, a hotel and casino, is a relatively small downtown Las Vegas gaming venue a block from the Fremont Street Experience and Las Vegas Boulevard. Slots, table games, and a race and sports book occupy one floor of the main pavilion, at this historic casino. It opened on Fremont Street on November 7, 1941, and is one of the oldest casino-hotel properties in Las Vegas, along with the nearby Golden Gate Hotel and Casino. Primarily Spanish Colonial Revival in style, it reflects a 1952 remodel when the façade was modernized. On February 22, 2013, the structure was placed on the National Register of Historic Places.

== History ==
Marion Hicks and J.C. Grayson built El Cortez, downtown Las Vegas' first major resort, for $245,000. El Cortez opened on November 7, 1941. The location at 6th Street and Fremont was originally considered too far from downtown, but it quickly became so profitable that Bugsy Siegel, Meyer Lansky, Gus Greenbaum and Moe Sedway bought the property in 1945 from J. Kell Houssels for $600,000. In 1942, FBI documents described Isadore Blumenfeld, alias Kid Cann, as the, "recognized leader of graft and racketeering in Minneapolis". They added that Blumenfeld was, "known to have corrupted City and County officials... and has been known to harbor criminals of various types." The same files also report that Kid Cann often boasted that he had the Minneapolis City Council, "in the palm of his hand." These files further allege that Kid Cann was involved with Bugsy Siegel in the running of the El Cortez Hotel and Casino in Las Vegas.

John Kell (J. Kell) Houssels Sr. (1895–1979) had originally opened the 59-room hotel and casino before the sale to the major organized crime figures. Houssels purchased the hotel back from Siegel's group in 1946 for $766,000. In 1963, the Pavilion Rooms were added after the hotel was purchased by Jackie Gaughan. Another 15-story tower addition was opened in 1984.

== Operations ==
=== Gaughan ownership (1963–2008) ===
The 64-room Cabana Suites were completed in the former Ogden House in 2009, bringing the total room count to its current 364. Gaughan, a casino owner and operator since the early 1950s, lived in El Cortez's tower penthouse and was known to be on the casino floor almost daily. The property is one of the few casinos to have never changed its exterior façade in Las Vegas, retaining the same signage and ranch-themed architecture for over seventy years.

Jackie Gaughan's son Michael Gaughan ran the sports and race book in the current casino under the name South Point Race and Sports Book during the late 2000s, but the sports book is now run by Station Casinos. El Cortez has undergone several renovations, with the latest major remodeling completed in 2006. New carpet, marble flooring, gaming machines, refurbished guest rooms and an upgraded kitchen for the restaurant were added. Although only a block away from the Fremont Street Experience, the hotel is part of the newly created Fremont East section of downtown. It has also created a main entrance off Las Vegas Boulevard (5th Street) by opening a block-long pedestrian walkway from the boulevard to the hotel's main entrance on 6th Street. El Cortez is also well known in the casino industry as the most prominent "break-in house" for new table-game dealers to get experience before moving onto bigger properties. The separate hotel in the back, the 100-room Ogden House, has been completely renovated into the 64-suite Cabana Suites.

=== Epstein ownership & renovations (2008–present) ===
In 2008, Jackie Gaughan sold El Cortez and its properties to Kenny Epstein. Over the next decade, Epstein and his business partners put more than $50 million of renovations into the property. Gaughan continued to live at the casino and still played poker in the poker room until his death on March 12, 2014.

As of 2013, it was the oldest continuously operating casino in Las Vegas. In March 2019, El Cortez was closed by police for several hours following a shooting.

In 2018, renovation work took place on 73 rooms located on the first five floors of the hotel tower. Additional hotel remodeling was underway in 2019. In 2021, as part of a $25M renovation project, the El Cortez opened up a high-limit room. Effective April 1, 2022, El Cortez became a 21-and-over property, prohibiting minors from all areas including the hotel and restaurants. The property's general manager said the change "comes after careful consideration and decades of trying to accommodate minors in a property that is focused primarily on gaming and popular casino bars".

Since the early 2020s, the El Cortez has had a novelty following online on YouTube and other streaming platforms, as it is one of the few Las Vegas casinos to allow players to stream their live table play to online audiences.

In the summer of 2024, El Cortez underwent a $20 million renovation of its casino, adding a high-limit slot room, two new bars, a new noodle restaurant called "Hot Noods" and a Starbucks coffee shop. The existing casino floor was also renovated, adding 10,000 square feet of casino space. Access in and around the property was also improved.

In April 2026, the casino's Siegel's 1941 restaurant, which had opened in June 2015 featuring Bugsy Siegel memorabilia, was closed, with an Alex Prime steakhouse slated to open in its place, named in honor of Alexandra “Alex” Epstein-Gudai, who worked at the casino with her father, Kenny, and died in February 2026.

== Photo gallery ==
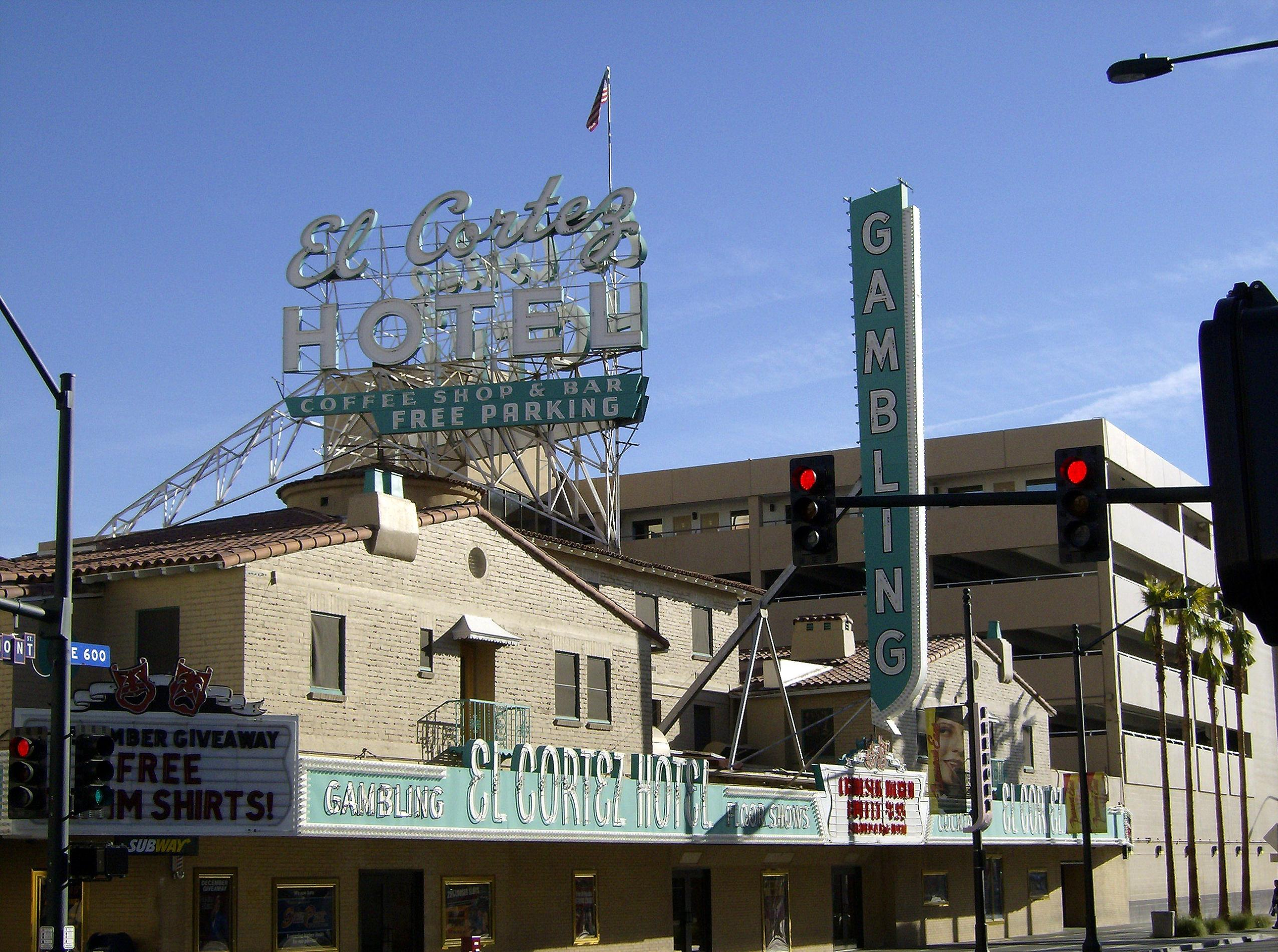
The same sign has been atop the casino since the 1940s

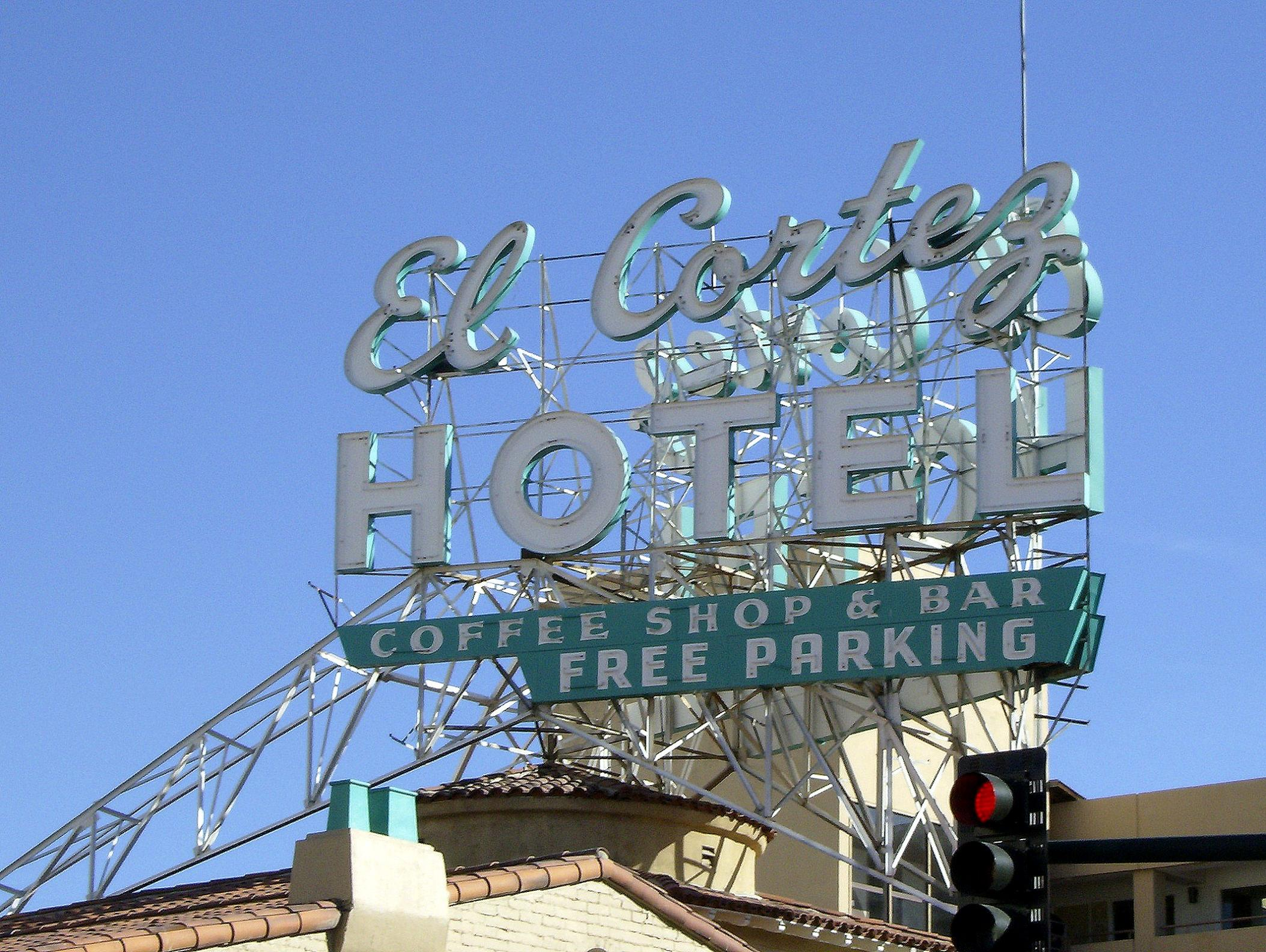
Close-up of the sign

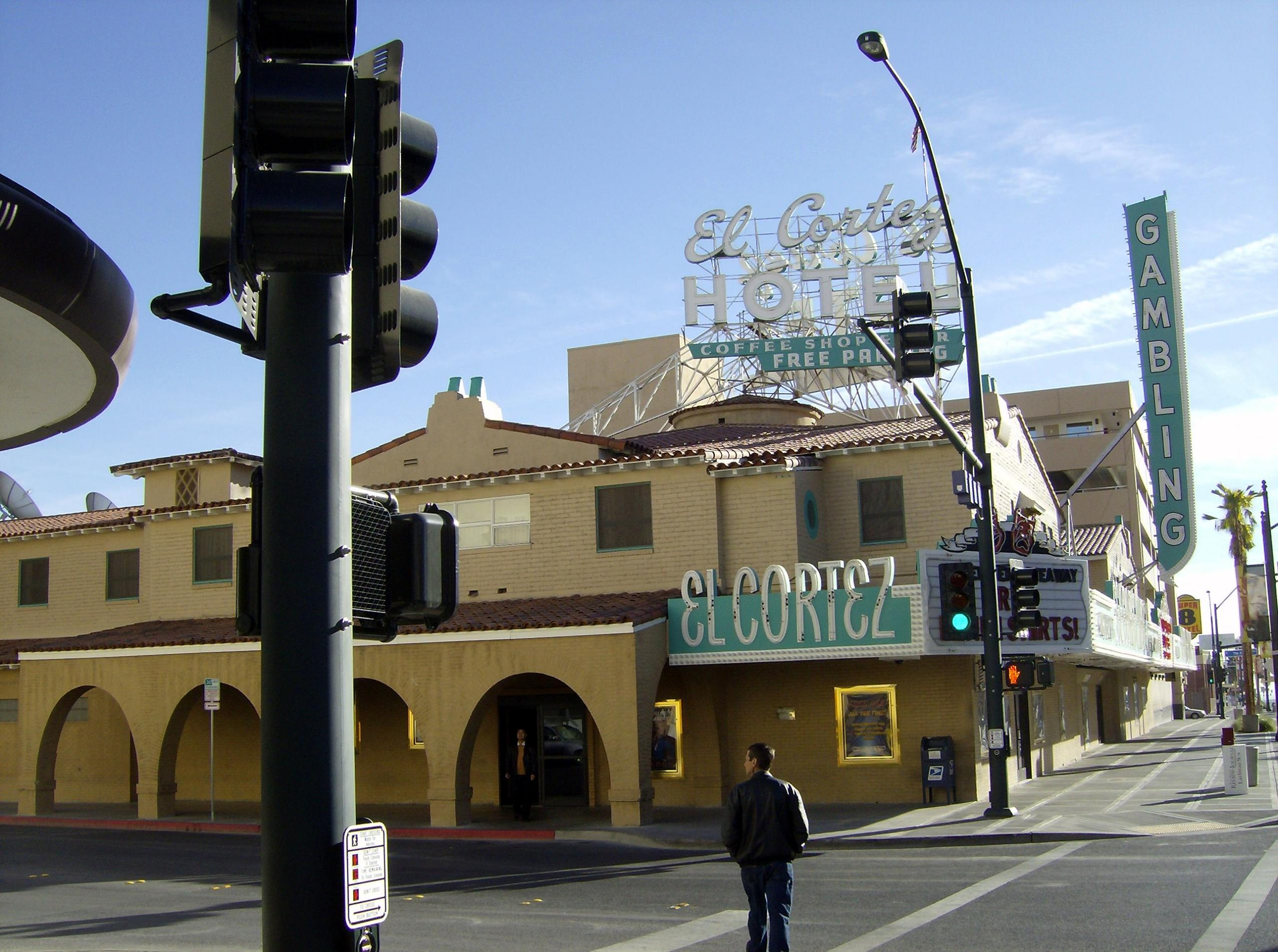
The Spanish Ranch theme dominates the exterior

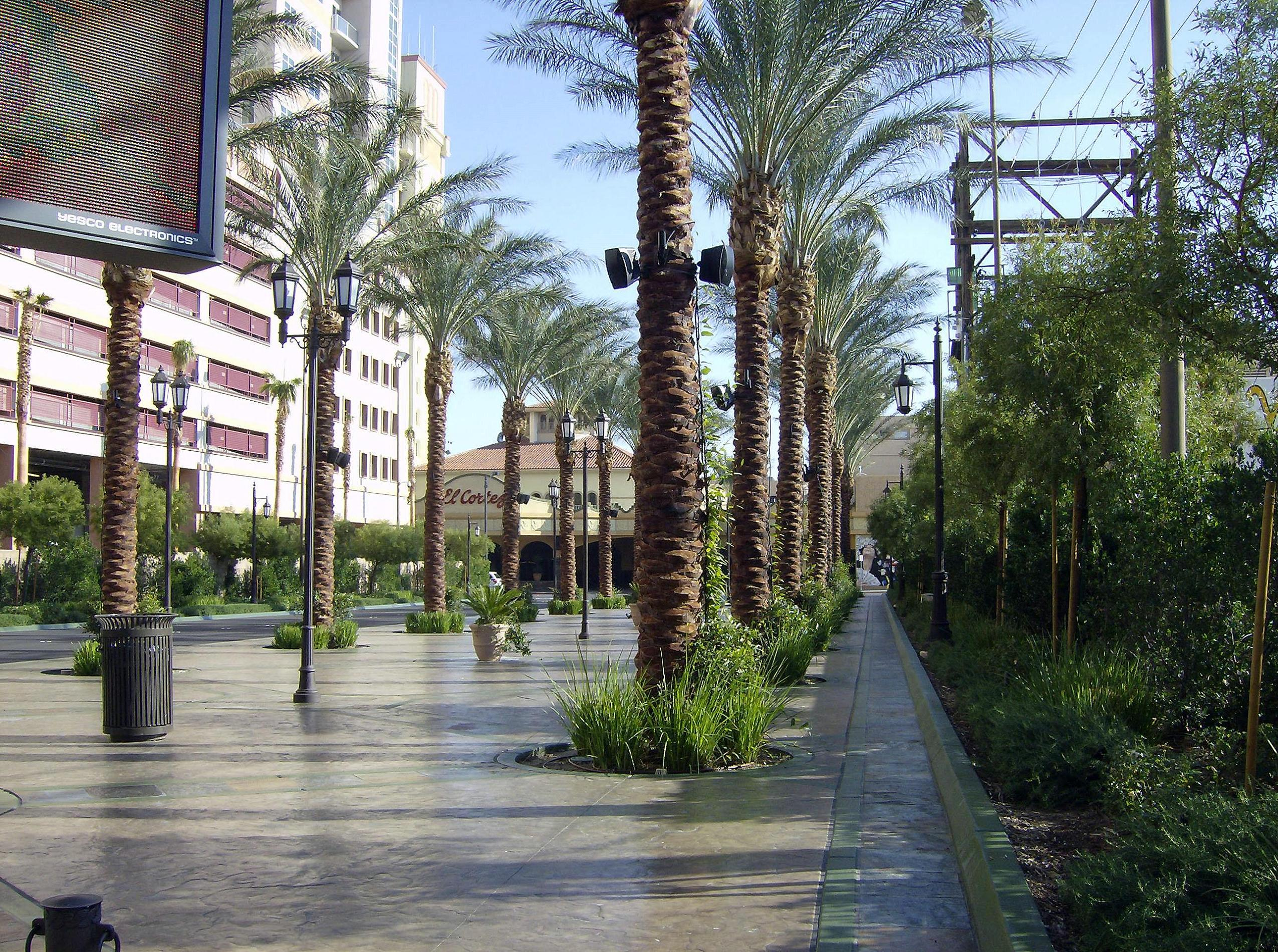
Las Vegas Blvd frontage was created with a palm tree lined walkway

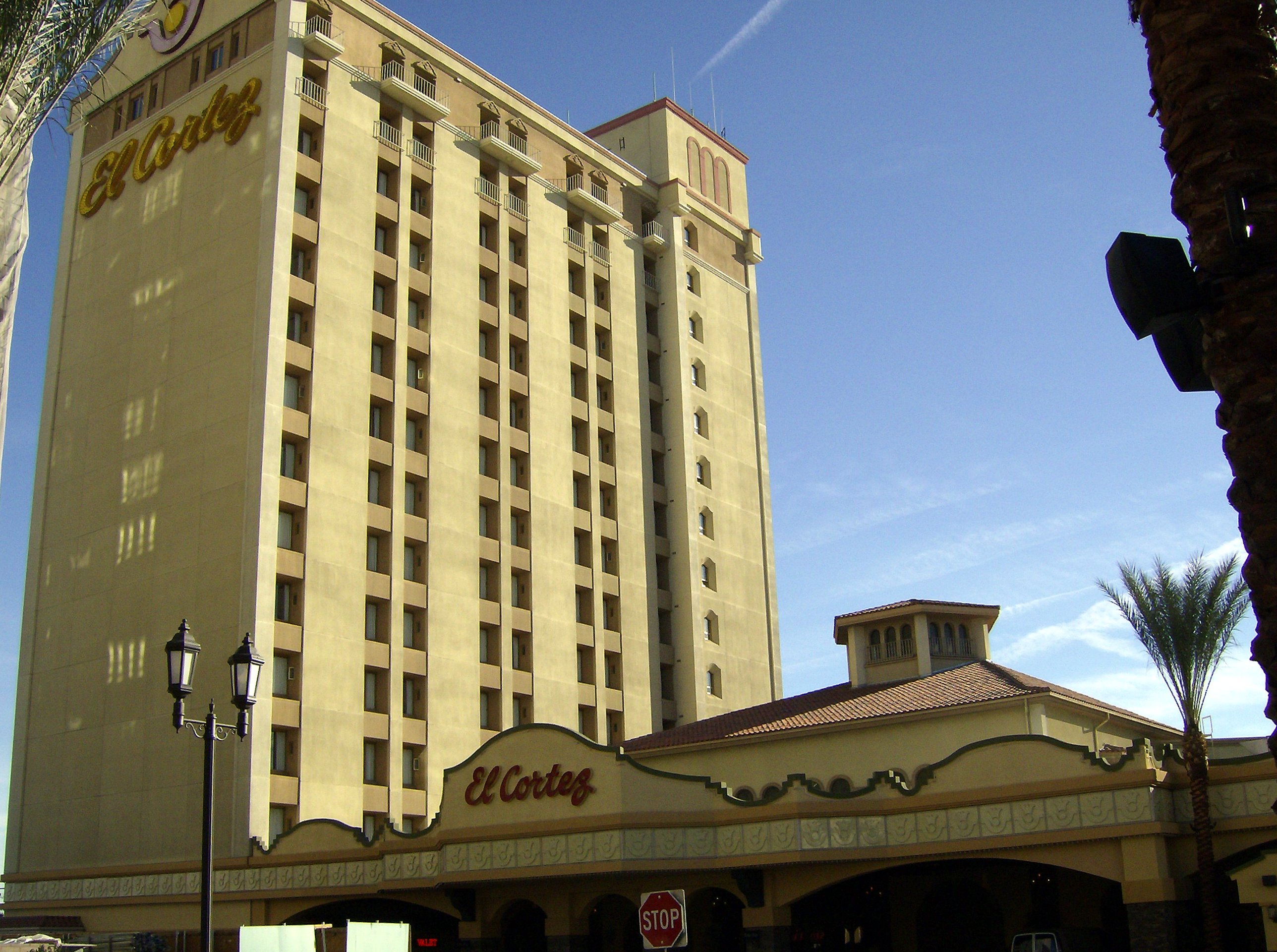
Hotel tower

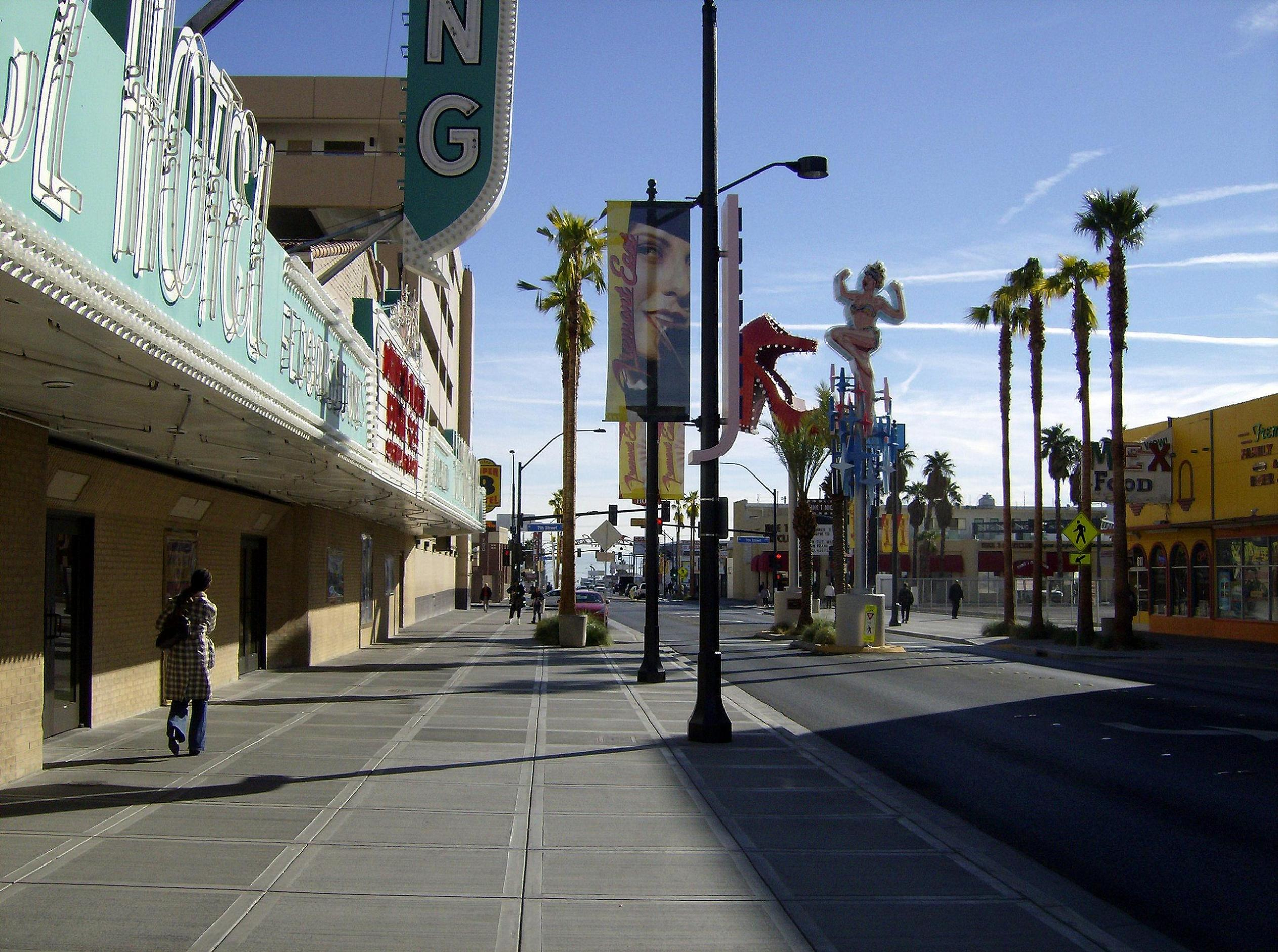
View of Fremont East from El Cortez.

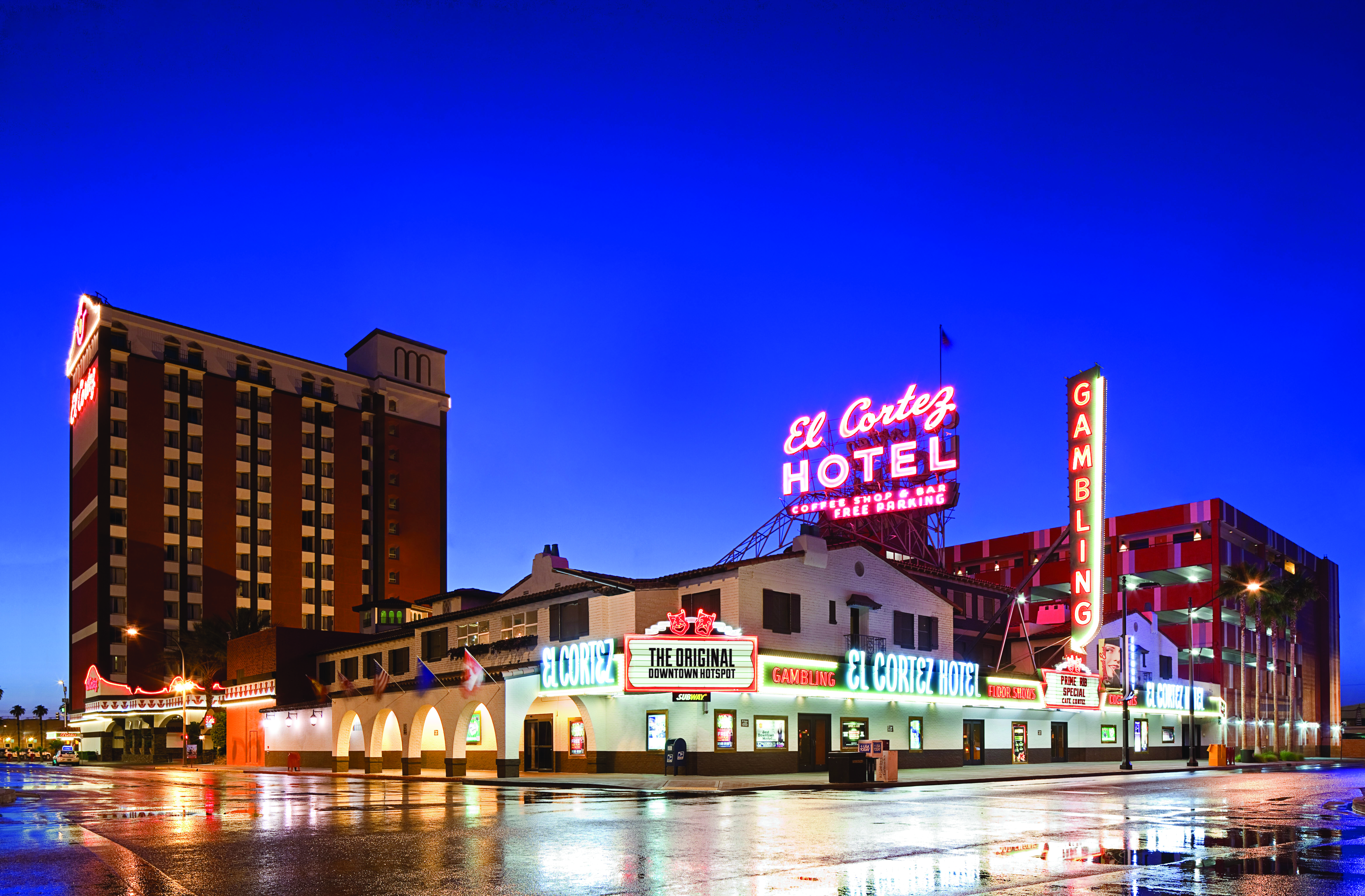
View of the iconic El Cortez sign at dusk

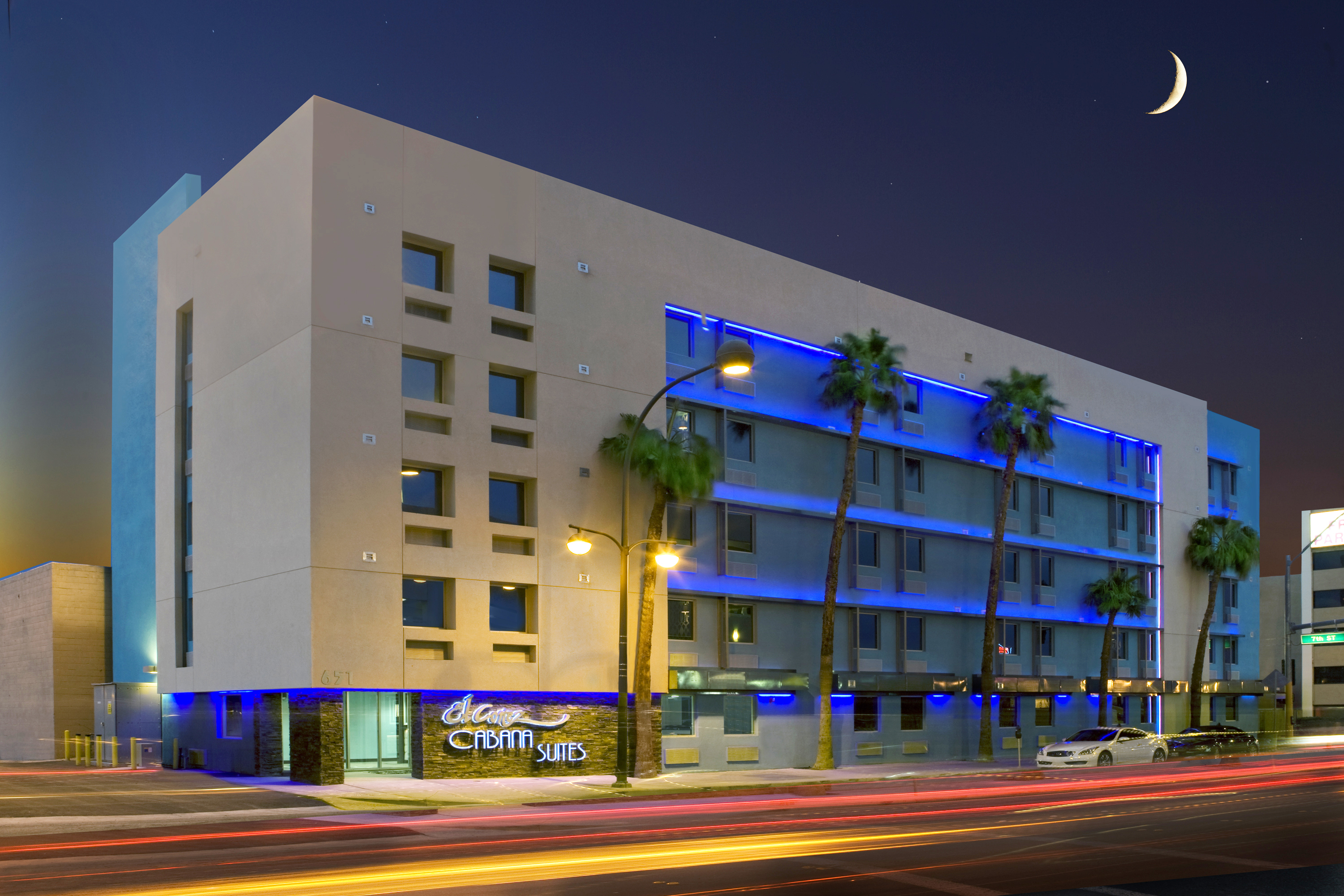
Exterior view of the Cabana Suites at El Cortez

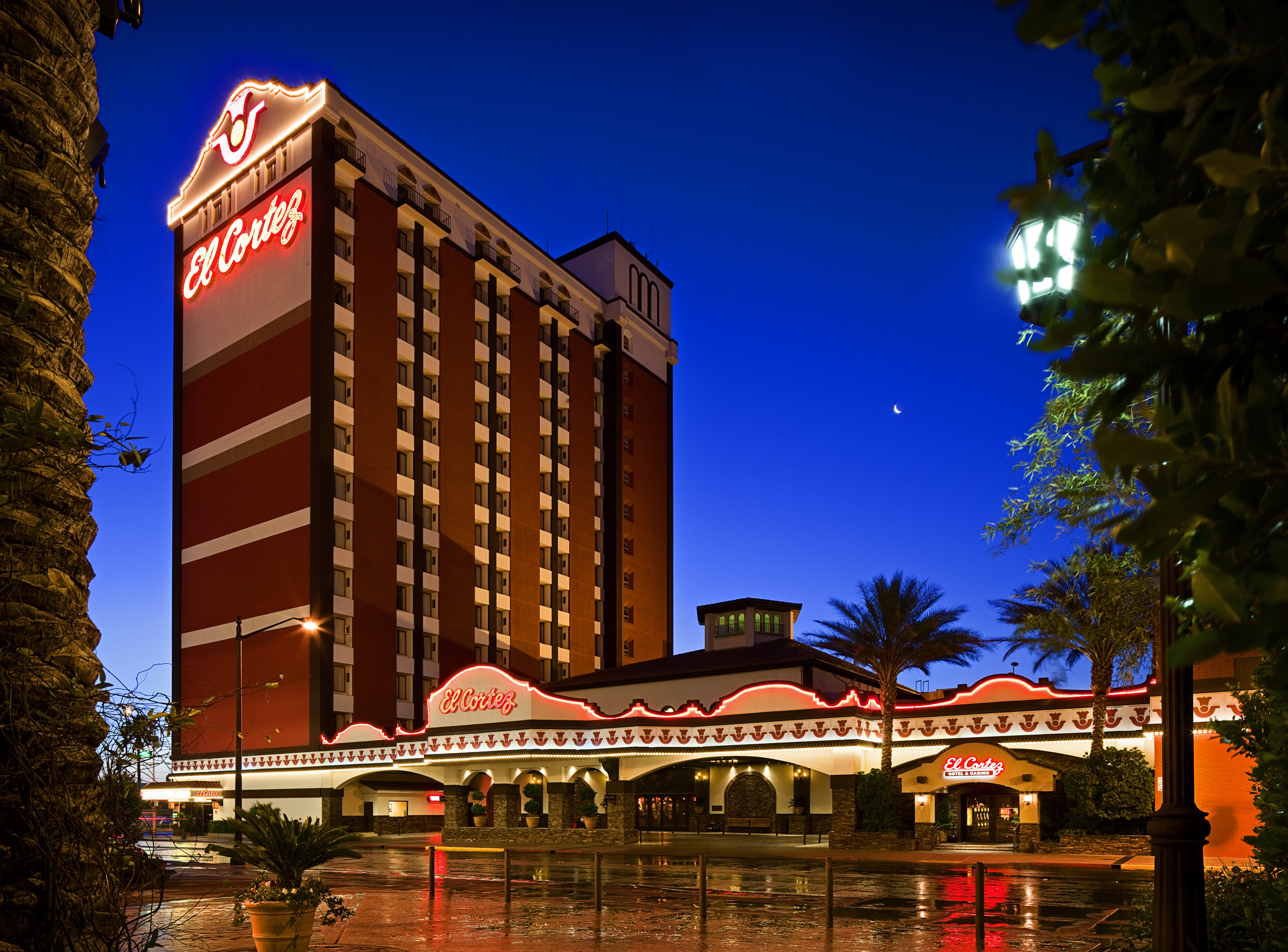
Exterior view of the Tower at El Cortez

== See also ==
- National Register of Historic Places listings in Clark County, Nevada
