= Moe Sedway =

American businessman and mobster (1894–1952)

- Sedway's NYPD mugshot
- Born: Morris Sidwirtz; July 7, 1894; Poland, Russian Empire
- Died: January 3, 1952 (aged 57); Los Angeles, California, U.S.
- Resting place: Hollywood Forever Cemetery
- Occupations: Mobster, businessman
- Spouse: Beatrice Sedway (m. 1936)

Moe Sedway (July 7, 1894 – January 3, 1952) was an American businessman and mobster. He was an associate of Benjamin "Bugsy" Siegel and a faithful lieutenant of organized crime czar Meyer Lansky. He and Gus Greenbaum made the Flamingo Hotel & Casino in Las Vegas very successful after Siegel's murder.

== Biography ==
Moe Sedway was born to a Jewish family as Morris Sidwirtz in 1894 in Poland.

At an early age, he began his criminal career in Manhattan in street gangs with Bugsy Siegel. He had a police record dating as far back as the early 1920s in New York. Later in his criminal career, he began making trips to Las Vegas on Meyer Lansky's behalf in the early 1930s to franchise the syndicate's Trans-America race wire service. By 1945, along with Gus Greenbaum, he was running the El Cortez Hotel with great success.

Sedway was also instrumental in the financing and construction of the Flamingo Hotel when William R. Wilkerson ran into financial difficulties. Sedway saw the Flamingo as unique opportunity for their group to expand operations in Las Vegas. Minutes after Bugsy Siegel's murder, Sedway and Greenbaum took possession of the Flamingo. No one questioned or disputed their authority. Under Sedway and Greenbaum's partnership, the Flamingo became a non-exclusive facility affordable to almost anyone. They made the enterprise extremely successful. In the first year, Sedway and Greenbaum turned a $4 million profit. He accurately predicted that the postwar demand for "entertainment" would be enormous. According to his calculations, hordes of gamblers from every state in the union would soon be flooding to Las Vegas.

Sedway served as a Clark County commissioner, and was head of the United Jewish Appeal in Las Vegas. He was also on the board of directors of the Clark County Library.

Sedway was married to Beatrice "Bea" Sedway. He died from natural causes in 1952. He is buried in Hollywood Forever Cemetery.

Sedway was a confidential federal informant.

== In popular culture ==
His name was merged with Gus Greenbaum's to inspire the name for the character "Moe Greene" in the American crime film The Godfather.
