= Ovid Demaris =

American journalist

Ovid Demaris (6 September 1919 – 12 March 1998 as Ovide E. Desmarais) was a native of Biddeford, Maine and an author of books and detective stories. A former United Press correspondent and newspaper reporter, he wrote more than 30 books and hundreds of newspaper articles. He graduated from the College of Idaho in 1948 and Boston University in 1950. Previously, he had served in the United States Army Air Forces.

His most important works were of a historical or biographical nature about the Mafia and other gangland characters. He is most noted for The Last Mafioso, his biography of Jimmy Fratianno, and for The Green Felt Jungle, his exposé on Mafia operations in Las Vegas.

== Books ==
=== Non-fiction ===
- 1960: Lucky Luciano, Monarch Books
- 1961: The Lindbergh Kidnapping Case, Monarch
- 1961: The Dillinger Story
- 1964: The Green Felt Jungle, Pocket Books, Montreal 1964; written with Ed Reid
- 1965: The Toughest Customers
- 1967: Jack Ruby, Da Capo Press, written with Garry Wills
- 1969: Captive City: Chicago in Chains, Sphere Books Limited
- 1970: Poso del Mundo: Inside the Mexican–American Border, from Tijuana to Matamoros ISBN 0-671-78066-2
- 1970: America the Violent, Cowles Book Co.
- 1974: The Lucky Luciano Story (The Godfather series), Belmont Tower Books
- 1974: Dirty Business: The Corporate-Political Money-Power Game, Harper's Magazine Press
- 1975: The Director. An Oral Biography of J. Edgar Hoover
- 1977: Brothers in Blood, The International Terrorist Network ISBN 0-684-15192-8
- 1978: Judith Exner: My Story, Grove Press, with Judith Exner
- 1980: The Last Mafioso, The Treacherous World of Jimmy Fratianno. Bantam Books ISBN 0-553-25474-X
- 1986: The Boardwalk Jungle, Bantam Books
- 1994: J. Edgar Hoover: As They Knew Him, Avalon Publishing Group

=== Novels ===
- 1957: Ride the Gold Mare
- 1957: The Hoods Take Over
- 1958: The Lusting Drive
- 1959: The Long Night
- 1959: The Slasher
- 1960: The Extortioners
- 1960: The Enforcer
- 1960: The Gold-Plated Sewer
- 1961: Candyleg (alternative title: Machine Gun McCain)
- 1963: The Parasite
- 1965: The Organization (alternative title: The Contract)
- 1966: Fatal Mistake
- 1971: Mason's Women
- 1972: The Overlord
- 1973: Legs Diamond
- 1983: The Vegas Legacy
- 1988: Ricochet

== Films ==
- 1958: Gang War - based on the novel The Hoods Take Over
- 1969: Machine Gun McCain - based on the novel Candyleg
