= Meyer Lansky =

American gangster (1902–1983)

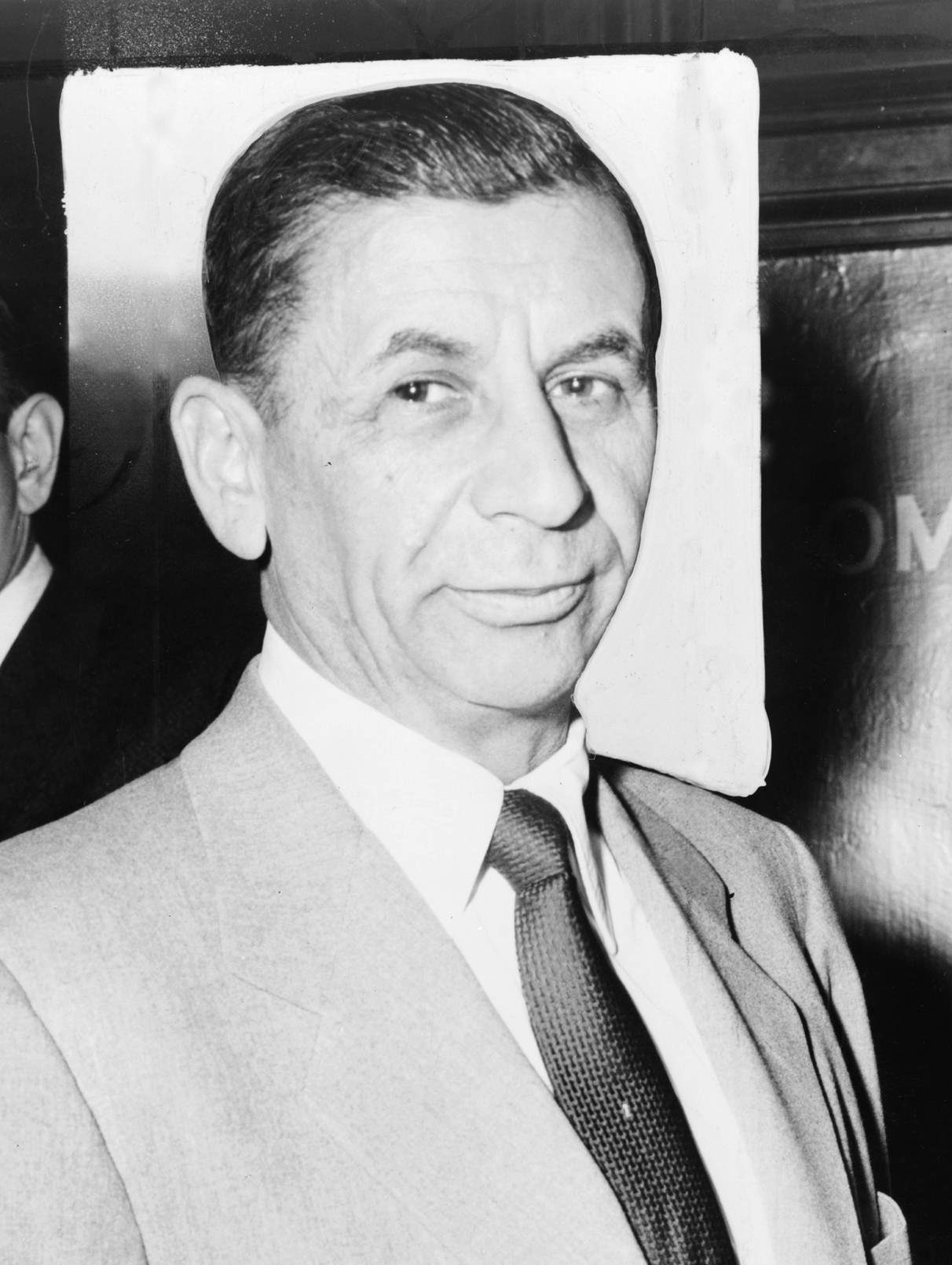
- Lansky in 1958
- Born: Maier Suchowljansky; July 4, 1902; Grodno, Russian Empire
- Died: January 15, 1983 (aged 80); Miami Beach, Florida, U.S.
- Resting place: Mount Nebo Cemetery, Miami, Florida
- Other name: "Little Man"
- Known for: Mafia associate; Mafia financier
- Spouse(s): Anna Citron (m. 1929; div. 1946) Thelma Schwarz (m. 1948)
- Relatives: Jake (brother)

Meyer Lansky (born Maier Suchowljansky; July 4, 1902 – January 15, 1983) was an American organized crime figure associated with gambling operations and illicit finance in the United States, Cuba, and the Caribbean during the mid-20th century. He was closely linked to Charles "Lucky" Luciano and is frequently described by historians and law-enforcement sources as a key figure in the formation of interethnic criminal cooperation in the United States, including the network later referred to as the National Crime Syndicate.

Lansky emerged from New York City’s Jewish underworld in the 1910s and 1920s and became primarily associated with gambling enterprises rather than narcotics trafficking. Contemporary investigations and later historical studies describe him as a financial organizer and intermediary who facilitated cooperation between Jewish and Italian-American crime figures, particularly in gambling and casino operations in Florida, Cuba, and Las Vegas. The extent of Lansky’s direct ownership interests and managerial control has been the subject of debate, with scholars cautioning that his role has often been exaggerated in popular accounts.

Despite decades of scrutiny by federal and state authorities, including nearly fifty years of investigation by the Federal Bureau of Investigation, Lansky was convicted only of illegal gambling offenses and was never found guilty of major financial or violent crimes. Estimates of his wealth during his lifetime varied widely in law-enforcement and journalistic accounts, but no substantial hidden fortune was recovered, and his estate at the time of his death was modest. Historians generally regard claims of extraordinary personal wealth as unproven and reflective of organized-crime mythology rather than documented financial control.

== Early life ==
Maier Suchowljansky was born on July 4, 1902, in Grodno, Russian Empire (now Belarus), to a Polish-Jewish family. When asked his native country, Lansky always responded "Poland". In 1911, Lansky emigrated to the United States through the port of Odessa with his mother and brother Jacob, and joined his father (who had immigrated in 1909) living on the Lower East Side of Manhattan, New York.

Lansky met Benjamin "Bugsy" Siegel when they were children. They became lifelong friends, as well as partners in the bootlegging trade, and together managed the Bugs and Meyer Mob, with its reputation as one of the most violent Prohibition gangs. Lansky was also close friends with Charles "Lucky" Luciano; the two met as teenagers when Luciano attempted to extort Lansky for protection money on his walk home from school. Luciano respected the younger boy's defiant responses to his threats, and the two formed a lasting partnership. They later associated with veteran gangster Arnold Rothstein until his murder in 1928.

== Career ==
=== Gambling operations, 1929–1945 ===
Luciano had a vision to form a national crime syndicate in which the Italian, Jewish, and Irish gangs could pool their resources and turn organized crime into a lucrative business for all—an organization he founded after a conference in Atlantic City organized by himself, Lansky, Johnny Torrio, and Frank Costello, in May 1929.

Lucky Luciano, Lansky's partner in the American Mafia

Also, as early as 1932, Lansky shifted money from illegal activities in New Orleans to Swiss offshore accounts. The Swiss secrecy law from 1934 sanctioned the money laundering by "banks whose officials knew very well they were working for criminals". By 1936, Lansky had established gambling operations in Florida and Cuba. These gambling operations were founded upon two innovations:

- Lansky and his connections had the technical expertise to manage them effectively based upon Lansky's knowledge of the mathematical odds of most popular wagering games.
- Mob connections and bribed law enforcement were used to ensure their establishments' legal and physical security from other crime figures and law enforcement.

There was also an absolute rule of integrity concerning the games and wagers made within their establishments. Lansky's "carpet joints" in Florida and elsewhere were never "clip joints", where gamblers were unsure whether the games were rigged. Lansky ensured that the staff administering the games were of high integrity.

With Carlos Marcello of Louisiana and Frank Costello of New York he was a partner in the New Southport and Beverly Club casinos of Jefferson Parish, Louisiana.

=== Opposing Nazi activity in America 1938–1941 ===
With the election of Hitler as the Chancellor of Germany in 1933, the influence and membership of the Nazi party grew. Soon after, the influence of the Nazi party spread to America, mostly among German immigrants, who formed the organization Friends of New Germany (FONG). In 1936, FONG was succeeded by the German American Bund, with increased Nazi activity including rallies, marches and demonstrations. At the request of the New York Judge and former Congressman Nathan Perlman, Lansky and his gang stepped outside their usual criminal activities to break up rallies held by the pro-Nazi German-American Bund. He recalled a particular rally in Yorkville, a German neighborhood in Manhattan, that he and 14 associates disrupted, on April 20, 1938:

The stage was decorated with a swastika and a picture of Adolf Hitler. The speakers started ranting. There were only fifteen of us, but we went into action. We threw some of them out the windows. Most of the Nazis panicked and ran out. We chased them and beat them up. We wanted to show them that Jews would not always sit back and accept insults.

When Judge Perlman offered to pay Lansky for his services, he declined: "I am a Jew, and I feel for the Jews in Europe who are suffering. They are my brothers".

=== World War II involvement, 1941–1945 ===
During World War II, Lansky was instrumental in helping the Office of Naval Intelligence (ONI)'s Operation Underworld, in which the government recruited criminals to watch out for German infiltrators and submarine-borne saboteurs. Lansky helped arrange a deal with the government via a high-ranking United States Navy official that secured Luciano's release from prison; in exchange, the Mafia provided security for the warships being built along the docks in New York Harbor. German submarines were sinking Allied ships in great numbers along the eastern seaboard and the Caribbean coast, and there was great fear of attack or sabotage by Nazi sympathizers. Lansky connected the ONI with Luciano, who reportedly instructed Joseph Lanza to prevent sabotage on the New York waterfront. Lansky was given an ONI contact code number and introduced ONI to John M. Dunn and Jeremiah Sullivan of the International Longshoremen's Association. After Lansky's death, a Medal of Freedom, which possibly had been secretly awarded to him for his deal with the ONI, was found amongst his possessions.

=== Flamingo Hotel, 1946–1947 ===
In 1946, Lansky convinced the Italian-American Mafia to put Siegel in charge of Las Vegas, and became a major investor in Siegel's Flamingo Hotel. To protect himself from the type of prosecution that sent Al Capone to prison for tax evasion and prostitution, Lansky transferred his growing casino empire's illegal earnings to a Swiss bank account, where anonymity was assured by the 1934 Swiss Banking Act. Lansky eventually bought an offshore bank in Switzerland, which he used to launder money through a network of shell and holding companies.

In 1946, Lansky attended a secret meeting in Havana to discuss Siegel's management of the Flamingo Hotel, which was running far behind schedule and costing Siegel's Mafia investors a great deal of money. The other bosses wanted to kill Siegel, but Lansky begged them to give his friend a second chance.

Despite this reprieve, Siegel continued to lose money on the Flamingo. A second meeting was then called. By the time the meeting occurred, the casino had turned a small profit. With Luciano's support, Lansky convinced the other investors to give Siegel more time. When the hotel started losing money again, the other investors decided that Siegel was finished. It is widely believed that Lansky was compelled to give the final okay on eliminating Siegel due to his long relationship with him and his stature in the organization.

On June 20, 1947, Siegel was shot and killed in Beverly Hills, California. Twenty minutes later, Lansky's associates, including Gus Greenbaum and Moe Sedway, walked into the Flamingo and took control of it. According to the FBI, Lansky retained a substantial financial interest in the Flamingo for the next 20 years. Lansky said in several interviews later in his life that if it had been up to him, "Ben Siegel would be alive today".

Siegel's death marked a power transfer in Vegas from New York's Five Families to the Chicago Outfit. Although his role was considerably more restrained than in previous years, Lansky is believed to have both advised and aided Chicago boss Tony Accardo in initially establishing his hold.

=== Cuba, 1946–1959 ===
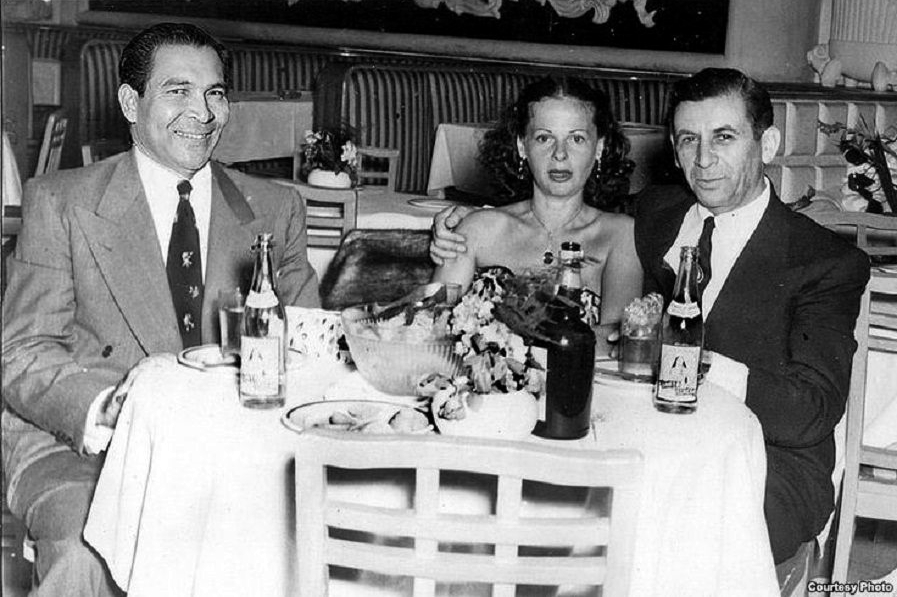
Lansky with his wife and future Cuban dictator Fulgencio Batista, 1948

Lansky was part of a group of mobsters who came to Havana in the 1940s and 50s that involved themselves in the casino and hotel industry on the island of Cuba. He established himself as the most powerful mobster in the country.

As early as 1937 he controlled the casino at the Hotel Nacional. In the same year Cuban dictator Fulgencio Batista gave Lansky the task of renovating the Oriental Park Racetrack casino. In 1939, to celebrate the renovation of the racetrack's casino, Batista was presented with the ceremonial keys to the casino. Batista and Lansky formed a renowned friendship and business relationship that lasted a decade. During a stay at the Waldorf-Astoria Hotel in New York in the late 1940s, it was mutually agreed that, in exchange for kickbacks, Batista would offer Lansky and the Mafia control of the country's casinos and racetracks. Batista would open Havana to large-scale gambling, and his government would match, dollar for dollar, any hotel investment over US$1 million, which would include a casino license. Lansky would put himself at the center of Cuba's gambling operations. He immediately called on his associates to hold a summit in Havana.

In 1946 Luciano's sentence was commuted as a thanks for his help during Operation Underworld. He was freed from US prison and deported, subsequently making his way to Cuba which he hoped would serve as a base of operations. In December 1946 Meyer Lansky co-hosted the Havana Conference with Luciano at the Hotel Nacional. It was attended by mafia families up and down the United States and set the National Crime Syndicates policy, rules, and business interests in the new postwar era. Lansky attempted to use his influence to keep Luciano in Cuba. He interceded personally with Batista and with his friend the Minister of the Interior, Alfred Pequeno. Eventually Luciano was deported under immense pressure from the US government who threatened an exports embargo on drugs going into Cuba should Luciano not be kicked out.

In 1952 Batista staged a coup that brought him back to power. He sought to clean-up and revitalize the gambling industry, so he brought in Lansky as an advisor on the gambling reform program. In 1955 Batista altered the gambling laws so that any club or hotel worth an amount equal to or in excess of $1 million was permitted to host a casino. Following this there was a surge of investment in the hotel and club industry of Havana. In 1956 Lansky began building the Havana Riviera hotel. He provided the majority of the $14 million used to build the hotel. It opened on 10 December 1957, for tax purposes Lansky listed his position as "kitchen manager". He ran the Montmartre Club, at which he set up a gambling school to teach young Cubans how to run games of blackjack, roulette and other games. Along with his associates he gained interests in the Sevilla Biltmore, the Internacional, the Commodore, and the Havana Hilton.

=== Cuban Revolution and flight to Bahamas (1959 and the 1960s) ===
The 1959 Cuban Revolution and the rise of Fidel Castro changed the climate for mob investment in Cuba. On New Year's Eve 1958, while Batista was preparing to flee to the Dominican Republic before settling permanently in Francoist Spain, where he died in exile in 1973, Lansky was celebrating the US$3 million he made in the first year of operations at his 440-room, US$8 million palace, the Havana Riviera. Many of the casinos, including several of Lansky's, were looted and destroyed that night. Lansky fled on January 7 to the Bahamas. In Nassau the Bay Street Boys were ruling.

A number of mafiosi were arrested and imprisoned by the new Cuban government but Lansky avoided arrest as he had already fled the country by then, leaving behind $17 million in cash, although his brother Jake Lansky was imprisoned in Triscornia. Lansky's businesses were nationalized and shut down. He would later say "I crapped out" in Cuba and his brother Jake joked to Lansky's children "Don't expect a lot of money. If your father died today, he's broke".

In 1975 American mercenary Frank Sturgis testified under oath that he was approached by an associate of Lansky with an offer of $1 million to assassinate Castro. Sturgis said that he was willing to accept the offer but that he did not receive "the go-ahead from his contacts in the American embassy". In August 1960 Lansky struck a deal in Miami with the former Prime Minister of Cuba Tony Varona. Varona would form a government-in-exile bankrolled by Lansky who would also help with the publicity side of things. Lansky promised millions of dollars in support in return for a re-opening of the hotels and casinos in a post-Castro Cuba. However the deal fell through.

After the mafia lost significant sources of revenue following Castro's revolution, they migrated elsewhere in the Caribbean to the Bahamas, as did Lansky. He was suspected of secretly owning the Lucayan Beach Casino at Freeport, Grand Bahama. In any case, he derived some form of income from the venture. Lansky bankrolled Lynden Pindling who became Prime Minister in 1967, Pindling facilitated Lansky's dealings in the country.

=== Attempted emigration and trial (1970–1972) ===
In 1970, Lansky fled to Herzliya Pituah, Israel, to escape federal tax evasion charges in the United States. He was a strong sympathizer with Israel. In the 1940s he held a fundraiser for the Hagannah at his establishment, The Colonial Inn, for which he made a donation. Overall $10,000 was raised. He also sent a $25,000 cheque to the Zionist American League for a Free Palestine. Israel fundraiser Shepard Broad recalled that "You did not have to ask Meyer Lansky twice" for money and that Lansky "was always waiting for me in the lobby, ready with a check". Lansky utilized the New York waterfront to smuggle arms to Zionist paramilitaries by diverting shipments of arms from their intended destination to Haifa. After the Six-Day War broke out in 1967, he made donations to the Emergency Fund for Israel, encouraging his friends to do so also.

At the time Israeli law did not permit the extradition of Israeli citizens, and under the Law of Return, any Jew could legally settle in Israel and naturalize. The Israeli government reserved the right to exclude Jews with a criminal past from settling in the country. Two years after his arrival, Lansky was deported back to the U.S. The federal government brought Lansky to trial with the testimony of loan shark Vincent "Fat Vinnie" Teresa. Lansky was acquitted in 1973.

== Personal life and death ==
In 1929 Lansky married Anna Citron, with whom he had three children, before divorcing in 1946. In 1948 he married Thelma Schwartz. They were officially married in Havana, Cuba on 16 December 1948. The ceremony consisted of nothing more than a private signing of papers in the office of a lawyer. Lansky did not want his first wife or children to know he had remarried.

Lansky retired in Miami and spent his last 10 years quietly at his home in Miami Beach, Florida. He died of lung cancer on January 15, 1983, aged 80.

=== Equity ===
At the time of his death in 1983, Lansky held few assets in his own name and left no substantial estate. While U.S. law-enforcement agencies long suspected that he retained access to undisclosed wealth, no verified cache of hidden assets was ever identified, and publicly released records do not establish a specific amount.

Lansky’s biographer Robert Lacey describes the final decades of his life as financially constrained, noting his difficulty paying medical expenses for his disabled son and the absence of evidence supporting claims that he controlled large, recoverable fortunes late in life. Lacey concludes that Lansky’s wealth and influence were frequently exaggerated and that much of his reputation reflected law-enforcement suspicion and organized-crime mythology rather than documented financial control. Family accounts cited by later journalists similarly describe Lansky as leaving a modest amount of liquid assets at his death, though such accounts are not independently corroborated.

Journalists and investigators who followed Lansky have argued that his influence was exercised less through personal ownership of assets than through long-standing personal and business relationships, including informal partnerships and trusted intermediaries. However, the extent to which such arrangements translated into retained personal wealth remains uncertain, and no comprehensive financial reconstruction has demonstrated that Lansky successfully concealed large sums beyond the reach of taxation or prosecution.

== In popular culture ==
=== In film ===
- The character Hyman Roth, portrayed by Lee Strasberg in the film The Godfather Part II (1974), is based on Lansky. Shortly after the premiere, Lansky phoned Strasberg and congratulated him on a good performance (Strasberg was nominated for an Oscar for his role), but added, "You could've made me more sympathetic." Roth's statement to Corleone that "We're bigger than U.S. Steel" was similar to something an FBI surveillance operation picked up Lansky telling his wife while watching a news story on the Mafia. The character Johnny Ola, Roth's right-hand man, was inspired by Lansky's associate Vincent Alo. The character Moe Greene, a friend of Roth, has a name that is a portmanteau of two of Lansky's associates who succeeded Bugsy Siegel (Moe Sedway and Gus Greenbaum), suggesting "Moe Greene" is a mashup based on several Jewish mobsters based in the Las Vegas.
- In Nicholas Roeg's 1983 film Eureka, based on the story of Sir Harry Oakes, Joe Pesci plays Mayakofsky, a Lansky stand-in looking to expand his gambling empire to The Bahamas.
- Maximilian "Max" Bercovicz, the gangster played by James Woods in Sergio Leone's 1984 film Once Upon a Time in America, was inspired by Lansky.
- In the 1990 Sydney Pollack film Havana, Mark Rydell plays Lansky.
- In the 1991 film Bugsy, a biopic of Siegel, Lansky is a major character, and played by Ben Kingsley, who was nominated for the Academy Award for Best Supporting Actor for his performance.
- In the 1991 film Mobsters, he is played by Patrick Dempsey.
- In the 2002 film Undisputed, the character Mendy Ripstein reveals that he worked for Lansky.
- In the 2005 film The Lost City, which presents a fictionalized account of Lansky's involvement in Cuba, Lansky is portrayed by Dustin Hoffman.
- In the 2015 film Legend, Lansky is referred to many times and sends associate Angelo Bruno, played by Chazz Palminteri, to London.
- In the 2018 film Speed Kills, Lansky is played by James Remar.
- In the 2021 film Lansky, based on Lansky's life, Harvey Keitel portrays the aging gangster, while John Magaro portrays him during his younger years.

=== In television ===
- In the 1981 NBC miniseries The Gangster Chronicles, the character Michael Lasker, played by Brian Benben, is based on Lansky. Because Lansky was still living at the time, the producers derived the "Michael Lasker" name to avoid legal complications.
- In the 1986–1988 TV series Crime Story, a fictional account with composite characters about the Mafia's expansion from Chicago into Las Vegas and American politics, the character Manny Weisbord, played by Joseph Wiseman, is based on Lansky.
- In the 1993 revival of The Untouchables, Chicago actor Marc Grapey played Lansky in two episodes.
- In the 1999 made-for-TV movie Lansky, Richard Dreyfuss stars as Lansky, Eric Roberts as Siegel, and Anthony LaPaglia as Luciano.
- In the HBO series Boardwalk Empire (2010–2014), Lansky is played by Anatol Yusef.
- In the 2013 TNT series Mob City, Lansky is played by Patrick Fischler. (Jeff Braine plays a younger Lansky in a flashback sequence.)
- In the 2015 AMC series The Making of the Mob: New York, Lansky is played by Ian Bell.

=== In literature ===
- In the 2010 book of photographs New York City Gangland, Lansky is seen "loitering" on Little Italy's famed "Whiskey Curb" with Siegel, Alo, and waterfront racketeer Eddie McGrath.
- In the 1996 novel The Plan, by Stephen J. Cannell, Lansky and Alo are involved in putting an anti-Racketeer Influenced and Corrupt Organizations Act presidential candidate into office.
- In Lansky, the 2009 one-act play by Joseph Bologna, Lansky is portrayed by Mike Burstyn.
- In the book Havana by Stephen Hunter, Lansky and Fidel Castro are both main characters.
- In the 2009 novel If The Dead Rise Not by Philip Kerr, the hero, Bernie Gunther, meets Lansky in Havana.
- In the 2009 novel Ride of the Valkyries by Stuart Slade, Lansky runs Cuba as the head of the Mafia.
- In the 2011 memoir of cocaine cowboy Jon Roberts, American Desperado, Roberts recounts several encounters such as his uncle Joe Riccobono's relationship with Lansky and the eventual asking for Lansky's personal permission to kill his stepson Richard Schwartz on October 12, 1977, in Miami in a revenge plot.
- Lansky is a supporting character in The Raiders, Harold Robbins's 1995 follow-up to The Carpetbaggers.
- In the 2015 novel World Gone By, by Dennis Lehane, Lansky is a supporting character and friend to fictional gangster Joe Coughlin. He is mentioned but not seen in the previous novel in the series, Live by Night.
- The 2016 book of photographs Organized Crime in Miami includes previously unpublished photos of Lansky and his second wife on their 1949 honeymoon, as well as photographs from Lansky's 80th birthday with his brother Jake, and longtime partners Alo and Harry "Nig Rosen" Stromberg.
- The 2019 comic book Meyer fictionalizes "one last caper" by the aged Lansky, involving a violent chase of a lost cocaine shipment. It is set in 1982 Miami and Florida Keys.

=== In music ===
- Wu-Tang Clan affiliated rapper Myalansky derived his stage name from Lansky.
- Jewish-Israeli musician Sagol 59 released the song "The Ballad Of Meyer Lansky" on his 2011 album Another Passenger. The song chronicles Lansky's life, including his time in Israel.
- Jay-Z refers to Lansky in the song “Party Life”.
