= Gus Greenbaum =

American gangster and manager of the Flamingo Hotel (1893–1958)

- Born: Gustave Greenbaum; February 26, 1893; Chicago, Illinois, U.S.
- Died: December 3, 1958 (aged 65); Encanto, Phoenix, Arizona, U.S.
- Cause of death: Murder
- Occupation: Businessman

Gus Greenbaum (February 26, 1893 – December 3, 1958) was an American gangster in the casino industry, best known for taking over management of the Flamingo Hotel in Las Vegas after the murder of co-founder Bugsy Siegel.

== Early life ==
Gustave "Gus" Greenbaum was born in Chicago to Jewish immigrant tailor parents Herman Greenbaum and Sarah Goldberger, who initially lived between New York City and Nebraska before settling in Illinois, according to the 1900 census. His parents originated from the Austro-Hungarian empire, with Sarah's birthplace documented as "Poland" on her birth record.

== Career ==
An associate of Meyer Lansky, Greenbaum joined his organization on New York's Lower East Side in the mid or late 1910s. During Prohibition, Greenbaum began working with the Chicago Outfit, managing the southwest division in Phoenix, Arizona, of the Trans-America Race wire service in 1928. He set up in the Luhrs Tower and developed strong relationships with Phoenix leaders even, allegedly, future Senator Barry Goldwater. Sent to Las Vegas shortly after World War II began, Greenbaum gained control over syndicate gambling operations with Morris Rosen and Moe Sedway. Sedway and Greenbaum ran the El Cortez Casino in 1945, until Greenbaum was asked by William R. Wilkerson to manage casino operations for the Flamingo Hotel. In 1946, Bugsy Siegel took over construction and creative control of the Flamingo, until it was shut down in January 1947 due to mounting losses as a result of Siegel's skimming.

== Murder and legacy ==
After Siegel's murder in June 1947, Greenbaum brought the struggling casino out of debt within several months, controlling several other syndicate casinos and bookmaking operations in Arizona within several years. He had been able to secure funding from Phoenix-based bank Valley National Bank, the first bank to lend money to the mob. Greenbaum planned to retire to Arizona and rejected offers to run the Riviera for Tony Accardo, though after Greenbaum's sister-in-law was murdered, he accepted the job. As a syndicate associate in Las Vegas, Greenbaum asked Tom Dragna of the L.A. Mob to order the deaths of Anthony Brancato and Tony Trombino for robbing the Sports and Racebook at the Flamingo Las Vegas Hotel Casino in Las Vegas. Shortly after his close friend and Chicago-enemy union organizer Willie Bioff's murder, Greenbaum's worsening gambling, womanizing, and drug habits eventually caused him to begin skimming from casino operations. His embezzlement was discovered by the Chicago syndicate. On December 3, 1958, Greenbaum and his wife, Bess, were found dead in their Phoenix home. Their throats had been cut with a butcher knife. Greenbaum was found in bed with a heating pad and his television turned on. He had nearly been decapitated. Bess sustained blunt trauma to her head before her throat was cut. Her head was padded with newspaper and a towel, seemingly to avoid blood stains on the furniture.

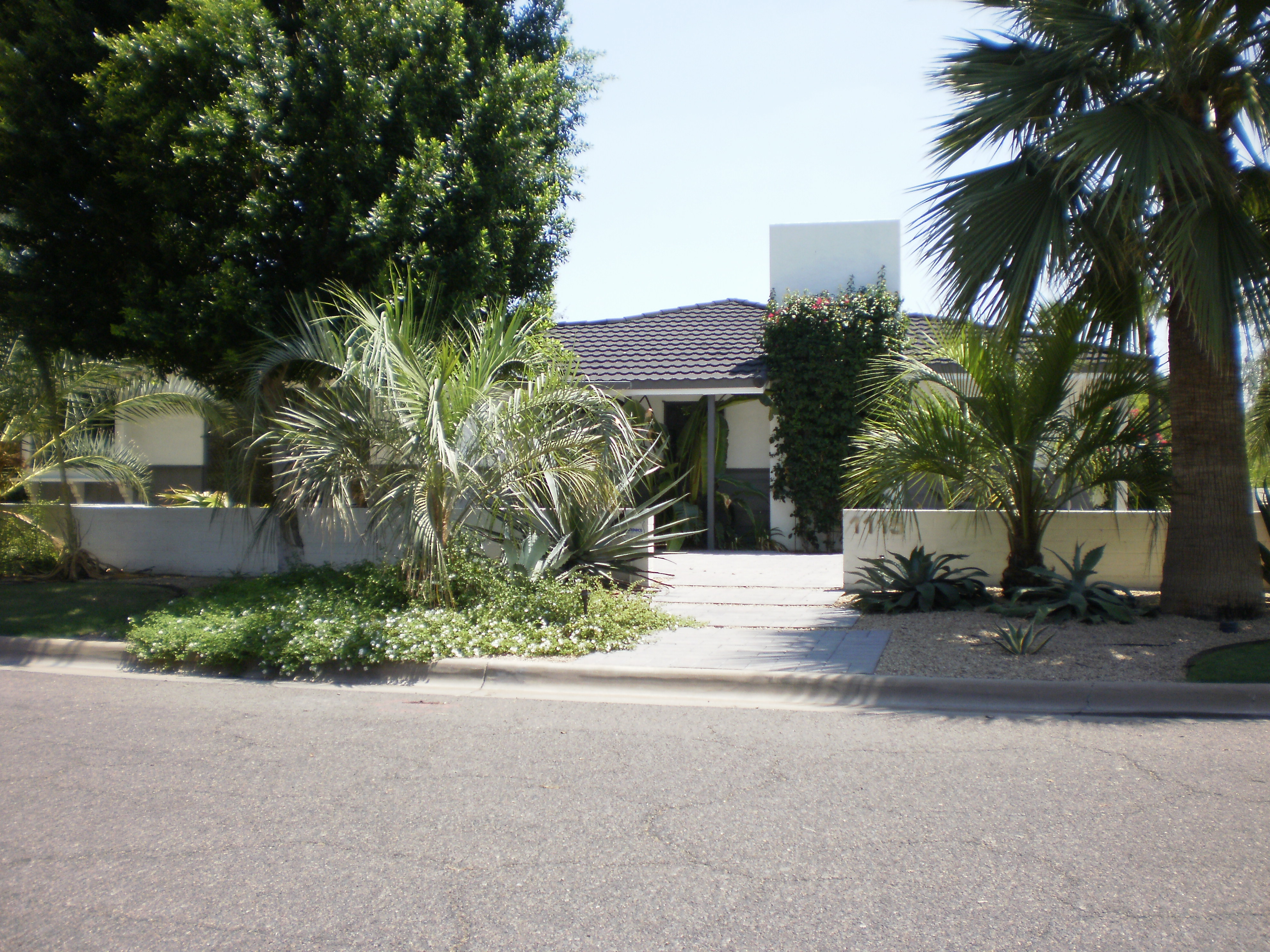
Present-day photo of Phoenix house where Greenbaum and his wife were murdered; location info from "The Naked Desert" by Dewey Webb

Greenbaum's name was merged with Moe Sedway's to inspire the name for the character "Moe Greene" in the crime drama film The Godfather.

== See also ==
- List of unsolved murders (1900–1979)
