= Alfred Polizzi =

American mobster

- Born: Alfonso Polizzi; March 15, 1900; Siculiana, Agrigento, Italy
- Died: May 26, 1975 (aged 75); Denver, Colorado, U.S.
- Other names: "Big Al"; Albert Allen
- Citizenship: American
- Occupations: Construction firm owner, crime boss
- Predecessor: Frank Milano
- Successor: John T. Scalish
- Spouse: Philomena Valentino
- Children: 3
- Allegiance: Cleveland crime family
- Criminal charges: Liquor law violations
- Penalty: Two-year sentence

Alfred Polizzi (born Alfonso Polizzi; Italian pronunciation: [alˈfɔnso poˈlittsi]; March 15, 1900 – May 26, 1975) was a Sicilian emigrant to the United States who was boss of the Cleveland crime family in Cleveland, Ohio, from 1935 to 1945. He stabilized the Cleveland crime family after a period of revenge killings, and was one of the most influential mobsters in the United States. He retired to Florida in 1945, where he was involved in the construction industry. He used several aliases, including "Big Al" and Albert Allen.

== Early life ==
Alfonso Polizzi was born in Siculiana, Sicily, Italy, on March 15, 1900, to Raimondo and Giovannina (née Indelicato) Polizzi. He emigrated from Italy to the United States with his family in 1909. His father, a blacksmith, settled the family on Woodland Avenue in one of Cleveland's Italian enclaves. He quit school at the age of 14 to sell newspapers on the street for the Cleveland News. The News was in a major circulation war with The Plain Dealer and the Cleveland Press. The News hired 24-year-old Arthur B. McBride as its circulation manager, and McBride hired young toughs like Polizzi not only to hawk newspapers but to intimidate sellers of other papers. In the summer of 1917, Polizzi worked as a lifeguard at Luna Park, where he met future mobster Fred Angersola.

Alfred had three brothers, Joseph (b. 1893?-d. 1965), Jasper (b. 1895?-d. 1957), and James (b. 1910?-d. 1979), and two sisters, Carmela (or Carmelina; b.1892?-d. 1963) and Catherine (b. 1920-d. ?). (Note: A sister, Angelina, was born in 1912 and died at the age of one. Another sister, Jenny, was born in 1922 and died at the age of 8 months.) Joseph was also involved in mafia activity, although at a low level.

Alfonso had an adopted brother, Charles "Chuck" Polizzi, also known as Albert Polizzi. Chuck Polizzi was born Leo Berkowitz. His parents were Russian Jews who had emigrated to Cleveland but died soon after their son was born. Historians Michael Newton and Hank Messick say Chuck was unofficially adopted by the Polizzis, but historian Albert Fried says the adoption was formalized. Chuck Polizzi is often mistakenly called Alfred's brother; Alfred himself said he felt Chuck to be a cousin.

== Cleveland crime family ==
=== Mayfield Road Mob and Cleveland Syndicate ===
In his late teens, Polizzi became a member of the Mayfield Road Mob, an Italian American gang that had formed in Cleveland's Little Italy neighborhood. As part of the Mayfield Road Mob, Polizzi became a close associate of mobsters Fred Angersola, George Angersola, John Angersola, Frank Brancato, and Charles Colletti. Polizzi quickly became gang leader Frank Milano's top lieutenant.

Polizzi engaged in extortion, and robbery, bootlegging, and other crimes. By the time he retired in 1945, he had been arrested seven times (four while using the alias "Albert Allen"). He was first arrested in 1920. He was convicted of violating the Volstead Act in 1926; he served six months in prison, and was fined $1,000 ($16,071 in 2025 dollars). He was arrested again in 1928 when Cleveland police suspected him of bombing the home of Nathan Weisenberg. Weisenberg ran a racket that controlled all the legal slot-machines in the area, forcing customers to lease them at high prices and skimming part of the profits. The Mayfield Road Mob attempted to take over the business, and Polizzi and Colletti were believed to have placed the explosives at Weisenberg's home in September 1928.

During Prohibition, Polizzi sold bootleg alcohol in Detroit, Michigan, and became a close associate of Detroit mobster Moe Dalitz. Dalitz, along with Maurice Kleinman, Louis Rothkopf, Sam Tucker, and Thomas "Blackjack" McGinty, was an original member of the Cleveland Syndicate, a group of Jewish and Irish mobsters based in Cleveland and Akron, who engaged in bootlegging and smuggling. The Cleveland Syndicate preferred to give a cut of its profits to mobsters in other criminal organizations, who then did the actual work of bootlegging or running illegal gambling operations. John Angersola and Alfred Polizzi were the two members of the Cleveland crime family to do bootlegging for the Syndicate. The Polizzi-run bootlegging operation moved large amounts of high-quality liquor into northeast Ohio and northwest Pennsylvania, generating substantial profits for Polizzi and the others involved.

The Arrowhead Club (or Arrowhead Inn) was established near Cincinnati, Ohio, in 1926, and featured bootleg liquor and illegal gambling. A few years later (probably no later than 1929), Polizzi became an investor in the Arrowhead Club along with other members of the Cleveland crime family and the Syndicate.

=== Role in the takeover by Frank Milano ===
By the early 1920s, the Cleveland mafia (or Cleveland crime family) had taken over the Mayfield Road Mob and become the dominant criminal organization in Cleveland. It was led by boss Joseph "Big Joe" Lonardo, and both Alfred and Chuck Polizzi sometimes acted as bodyguards for Lonardo and his family. Lonardo was assassinated in June 1927 by Salvatore "Black Sam" Todaro and Joseph "Big Joe" Porrello. Todaro was killed by the Lonardo family in June 1929.

Corn sugar (Note: Corn sugar is created by treating corn starch slurry with hydrochloric acid and then heating the mixture under pressure for several minutes. When filtered, clarified, concentrated, and seeded with a few dextrose crystals, the mixture can be poured into shallow pans where it will crystallize. It is generally sold in slabs, as pellets, or in chips.) was the key to the manufacture of corn whiskey. Corn whiskey was usually made with cornmeal or unground corn mixed with rye as the mash. Corn sugar could not only be substituted for grain as the mash ingredient but also permitted faster production of the final liquor. Control of the corn sugar industry as well as the distribution of illegal liquor was critical to creating wealth, and the Porrellos produced and distributed most of the corn sugar in northeast Ohio. Frank Milano wanted the Porrellos' business, and in early 1930 invited Joseph Porrello and his top lieutenant, Sam Tilocco, to meet at Milano's Venetian Restaurant at 12601 Mayfield Road in Cleveland. Polizzi attended the meeting. It quickly became apparent to Porrello that Milano wanted to take over his business, not form a partnership. Porrello made a counter-proposal: That he be allowed to join the East End BiPartisan Political Club, an organization Milano had founded to put mafia money and organizational muscle behind preferred political candidates. Milano refused.

In late June, Porrello established his own political club. On July 4, Polizzi telephoned Porrello and arranged a meeting for the following day at the Venetian Restaurant. Polizzi greeted Porrello and Tilocco as they arrived shortly before 2 p.m. on July 5. (Note: Most sources say Alfred Polizzi was present for the meeting. Michael Newton says Chuck Polizzi, not Al, was at the meeting.) Also present were Milano and Mayfield Road mobsters John Angersola and Charles Colletti. The six men played cards and discussed business. Gunfire erupted, and both Porrello and Tilocco were killed.

Milano and the Mayfield Road Mob were now in control of the Cleveland crime family. Polizzi, who fled the scene of the crime, was wanted by the police for questioning. By the time he turned himself in to the police at the end of July, the police declined to interview him. The investigation into the Porrello/Tilocco murder had turned up no clues, and the police had no questions to ask him.

Cleveland police arrested Milano in March 1932 for being a "suspicious person". Police officials at the time suspected him of bootlegging and attempting to take over a number of different rackets in the area. A court dismissed the charge, saying being "suspicious" is not enough to warrant arrest.

=== Career under Milano ===
Along with John Angersola, Charles Colletti, and Anthony Milano, Alfred Polizzi was one of the top leaders of the Cleveland crime family under Milano's rule. Police believed he ran more numbers rackets in the area than any other criminal, and he became close to Cleveland mobsters John DeMarco and John T. Scalish. Although the Cleveland crime family had a reputation for using murder as a way of dealing with threats, Polizzi came to favor bribery instead. He spent many years attempting bribe officials into paroling Toledo, Ohio, gangster Thomas "Yonnie" Licavoli, who was convicted of murder in 1934. (Note: Polizzi's sudden interest in Yonnie Licavoli was because of the close relationships the Cleveland crime family and the Syndicate had with the Purple Gang. The Purple Gang was an extremely violent Jewish gang in Detroit that engaged in bootlegging, drug running, extortion, hijacking, jewelry store robberies, murder, and other crimes. The Purple Gang brought Yonnie Licavoli, his brother Pete, and his cousin James, to Detroit as gunmen. The Purple Gang had close connections with Moe Dalitz and Chuck Polizzi, as Detroit was one of the main entry points in the United States for illegal liquor.)

In December 1932, Polizzi and eight others from the Cleveland Syndicate and the Cleveland crime family formed Buckeye Enterprises Company. (Note: The other investors consisted of Dalitz, Rothkopf, and Tucker from the Syndicate and John Angersola, Chuck Polizzi, Martin O'Boyle, and Harry Potter from the Sicilian-Italian mafia.) Buckeye Enterprises invested in a wide range of legal and illegal businesses, including the Thomas Club (a luxury casino in the Cleveland suburb of Maple Heights), the Continental Supper Club (a casino and restaurant located at 8591 Carnegie Avenue in Cleveland), Shaw-Clair Catering, Superior Catering, Eastern Service Company (a company which laundered income from Buckeye Enterprises so as not to draw attention from the Internal Revenue Service), and Buckeye Catering (which acted as a front for a slot machine leasing and profit-skimming business). (Note: Other organized crime figures who invested in Buckeye Catering were John Angersola, Chuck Polizzi, and Nathan Weisenberg.)

Polizzi co-owned Tornello Importing Co., an olive oil, pasta, and tomato paste importation business, with Frank Milano. It was a front for numerous illegal activities, and used to launder money. With Frank Milano and Moe Dalitz, Polizzi was also a partner in the Molaska Corporation. Formed in 1933 just 10 days after the end of Prohibition, it manufactured dehydrated molasses for use in alcohol manufacturing nationwide. (Note: Other investors included Meyer Lansky, Lucky Luciano, and Frank Costello (Luciano's lieutenant).) This product was also used in the illegal manufacture of alcohol, which was sold tax-free and often adulterated.

Polizzi also invested widely in distilleries. These investments were an attempt to "go legit" (invest in legal business enterprises), (Note: Another early legitimate investment was the incorporation of Garbo Foods Specialty, a luxury food importer and distributor.) Among the more important ones was Lubeck Brewing and Distributing of Cleveland, which he obtained control of in 1939. The following year, Polizzi purchased the Sunrise Brewing Company of Cleveland. He changed the name to Tip Top Brewing, and the purchased an independent beer distributor. Polizzi established a fake bank account at the Morris Plan Bank in Cleveland under the name of Fred W. Garmone, a well-known local criminal defense attorney who did extensive work for the Cleveland crime family. The money in this account was used to guarantee loans the bank made to retail customers of Tip Top. In return, the retailers purchased their alcoholic beverage exclusively from Tip Top. This created a "tied house" arrangement in violation of federal law.

== Boss of the Cleveland crime family ==
=== Becoming boss ===
On January 30, 1935, Milano fled to Mexico to avoid prosecution for income tax evasion. As Milano could not run the Cleveland crime family from across the border, he stepped down as boss and was succeeded by Alfred Polizzi. Although most sources say Polizzi was officially named boss in 1935, former Cleveland FBI chief Joe Griffin says power did not transfer until 1942.

=== National leadership and power-sharing ===
Polizzi gained a seat on the Grand Council of the Sicilian Mafia, a group of nine leaders of the Sicilian Mafia in the United States. According to future Cleveland crime family underboss Angelo Lonardo, Polizzi also had a seat on The Commission, a seven-member group of American mafia families that handled high-level disputes, and began to associate with mobsters such as Frank Costello, Joe Doto (a.k.a. Joe Adonis), Lucky Luciano, and Joe Profaci.

It's unclear how much control Polizzi had over the Cleveland mafia. Cleveland mafia historian Rick Porrello has written that The Commission made it clear to Polizzi that Syndicate leader Moe Dalitz was the real authority in Cleveland. (Note: Italian and Sicilian mafia in the United States routinely blocked Jewish gangsters from becoming members, although they associated with them and used their services. This began to end after the establishment of The Commission, although some crime families continued to adhere to the old rules barring Jews from becoming "made men".) Dalitz and Polizzi also stayed in routine touch with Frank Milano in Mexico, occasionally traveling to see and consult with him. (Note: Messick documents the first trip as occurring in early 1937.) Polizzi partnered with Dalitz in various illegal enterprises while head of the Cleveland crime family, which allegedly made both men wealthy. Nevertheless, at one point U.S. Senate investigators characterized Polizzi as one of the most influential members of the American mafia.

In addition to his partnerships with Moe Dalitz, Polizzi continued to engage in a wide range of lucrative criminal activities on his own. Mobster James Ragen and U.S. Senate investigators believed that Polizzi controlled the wire service in Cleveland, bringing him extensive income from betting shops and parlors. During Polizzi's tenure as boss in Cleveland, he relinquished control of mafia activities in Youngstown, Ohio, to another family. (It is unclear whether he did so on his own initiative, or at the request of another crime family.) The Cleveland crime family continued to receive 25 percent of the profits from the Youngstown rackets (primarily gambling and vending machines), which averaged about $5,000 to $6,000 ($89,418 to $107,301 in 2025 dollars) a month in the 1970s.

Polizzi was also an investor in the Beverly Hills Country Club of Newport, Kentucky. The casino, established in 1937, was one of the most lucrative gambling establishments in the region and heavily patronized by organized crime leaders. Polizzi received a portion of the profits, and continued to do so long after he had retired.

In 1938, former Detroit gangster James T. Licavoli, Yonnie Licavoli's cousin, asked Polizzi for permission to operate in Cleveland. The Licavolis had left Detroit for Toledo in 1931, but returned to Detroit about 1933 or 1934. The establishment of the Detroit crime family in 1931 under William "Black Bill" Tocco left the Licavolis with no room to operate. Polizzi gave Licavoli permission to resettle in Cleveland and begin criminal activities.

=== Protecting Angelo Lonardo ===
Lonardo says he sought permission from boss Frank Milano to kill Giuseppe "Dr. Joe" Romano, whom Lonardo believed to be involved in the murder of his father, Joseph "Big Joe" Lonardo. Milano approved the assassination, which occurred on June 10, 1936. The revenge killing of a crime family boss required approval by The Commission, approval that had not been sought. To protect Lonardo (who was not then a "made man" and member of any mafia) from assassination, Alfred Polizzi was forced to defend the killing before a meeting of the Commission. Lonardo was permitted to live only because Polizzi successfully argued that as a "civilian" he did not yet know the rules of the mafia.

=== Liquor dealing conviction ===
In 1943, Polizzi got involved in an illegal liquor sales operation that later led to a conviction under federal law.

At the time, the state of Ohio had a monopoly on the sale of liquor, which sold it to dealers and retailers at a set price. Liquor was scarce due to World War II, so the state permitted liquor to be purchased from out-of-state manufacturers. The state required that out-of-state suppliers be registered, and taxes paid on the alcohol. (Note: Peerless was one of the largest manufacturers of alcohol illegally imported into the United States during Prohibition.) Polizzi purchased 1,501 cases of liquor from Peerless and sold it to tavern owners at a price $9.00 ($167 in 2025 dollars) above the legal price. Of this markup, $5.00 ($93 in 2025 dollars) went to Peerless and $4.00 ($74 in 2025 dollars) to Polizzi.

The venture proved so profitable that Polizzi made a new deal with Peerless. Peerless agreed to register the Ohio Department of Liquor as an importer of out-of-state liquor and as a liquor retailer. Out-of-state liquor manufacturers often found themselves with excess stock they could not sell, or for which they lacked bottles. Peerless obtained this excess stock and brought it to Ohio. Polizzi illegally sold the liquor, and kicked back $1.00 ($19 in 2025 dollars) for every case of liquor imported. The scheme worked so long as the state of Ohio and the federal government believed the imported liquor remained in warehouses and was not sold. For this, Peerless and Polizzi needed warehouse receipts. Through a series of middlemen, Polizzi purchased legitimate warehouse receipts for use by his liquor distributors. The scheme made an extremely large amount of money.

The scheme fell apart when Polizzi's warehousemen failed to produce the proper receipts for federal inspectors. Polizzi and three others were arrested in late December 1943 on 28 counts of federal liquor and tax law violations. Deciding to get out of the brewery business, Polizzi sold Tip Top Brewing in July 1944 for $1 million ($18,605,769.23077 in 2025 dollars). Polizzi reached a plea bargain with federal prosecutors about September 20, 1944, under which he agreed to plead guilty to a single count of selling liquor without a federal wholesale liquor dealer's license. Polizzi was sentenced to two years in jail, and required to pay a $5,000 fine ($100,000 in 2025 dollars).

Polizzi was released in prison in late 1945 (having served a total of two years), and moved to Coral Gables, Florida. He retired as boss of the Cleveland crime family, and was succeeded by John T. Scalish.

== Post-conviction career ==
=== Legitimate business activities ===
By his own account, Polizzi moved to Florida with $300,000 to $500,000 ($5,600,000 to $9,300,000 in 2025 dollars) in profits from past criminal and legitimate activities. Media reports in 1951 said the amount was closer to $300,000, although mafia historian Rick Porrello puts the amount at $400,000 ($7,153,419.59335 in 2025 dollars) (Note: According to Cleveland Magazine in 1978, Polizzi had earned more than $100 million ($1,788,354,898.3364 in 2025 dollars) from illegal gambling and slot machine activities.)

George and John Angersola settled near Coral Gables as well. Polizzi loaned them a large amount of money, and went into business with them. The three established the Polkin Company (an amalgam King—the Angersola alias—and Polizzi) to build homes and hotels. (Note: "John King" was an alias of John Angersola.)

In 1947, Polizzi went into business with Forrest Thompson. About six months earlier, Cleveland mafioso Vincent "Doc" Mangine introduced the two. Assisted by attorney Nick Mangine, Vincent's brother, they formed Thompson-Polizzi Construction in Coral Gables. By this time, Arthur McBride was also involved in real estate development in southern Florida. Partnering with McBride, Thompson-Polizzi Construction built extensively in and around Coral Gables. The company built two luxury movie theaters, an A&P supermarket, and other structures which are now landmarks in the city. (Note: Thompson-Polizzi also built a $90,000 home for Detroit crime family consigliere Joe Massei in Miami Beach, Florida.) He built a shopping center for Charles "Bebe" Rebozo (a confidante of President Richard Nixon) in 1967.

Polizzi and McBride often co-invested as individuals in construction projects which made substantial profits. Their first business transaction together occurred in 1948 when they formed H.&I. Holdings, a real estate development company. Both men turned over property to the company as their initial investment. About 1949 or 1950, Polizzi and McBride purchased a former golf course in Coral Gables and built homes there. The deal was worth at least $102,000 ($1,364,937.75934 in 2025 dollars).

Polizzi was also involved in Arizona real estate. On August 8, 1947, members of the Cleveland crime family and the Cleveland Syndicate formed Tucson Motels. Polizzi had become interested in Arizona during his 1937 and subsequent visits, and Moe Dalitz had a large ranch there which he used for hunting. Alfred Polizzi put in $35,000 ($504,657.22802 in 2025 dollars) into Tucson Motels, making him the biggest investor. Chuck Polizzi, Dalitz, Kleinman, Rothkopf, and Tucker each put up $14,000 ($504,657.22802 in 2025 dollars). Tucson Motels constructed several luxury hotels in the area, which were used by visiting mobsters. Arizona quickly became heavily infiltrated by organized crime.

When Cleveland mobster Thomas J. McGinty settled in Palm Beach, Florida, in the early 1950s, Polizzi staked him the cash he needed to form his own real estate company. McGinty was one of a large group of gangsters who rapidly built up Palm Beach, and ending up owning extensive real estate north and south of the city as well.

=== Continuing criminal activity ===
While in prison awaiting trial, Polizzi was involved in helping a number of gangsters to flee Cleveland. In 1943, George Angersola, John Angersola, Shondor Birns, Angelo Lonardo, Chuck Polizzi, Milton Rockman (Scalish's brother-in-law), Angelo Sciria, and 17 other Cleveland area mobsters were indicted for running numbers rackets. Although the indictments were a secret, most of these individuals fled Cleveland secretly aboard Arthur McBride's yacht, the Wood Duck, and relocated to Florida. (Note: McBride allegedly assisted in the mass escape.) On June 3, 1944, Polizzi purchased the Wood Duck for $5,000 ($100,000 in 2025 dollars).

In 1946, Polizzi helped James Licavoli win parole.

When Wilbur Clark built the Desert Inn casino in Las Vegas, Nevada, in 1947, he sought and received capital from a group of mobsters that included Moe Dalitz, Maurice Kleinman, Thomas J. McGinty, Louis Rothkopf, and Sammy Tucker. Polizzi and the Cleveland crime family were asked to also provide capital. Polizzi turned down the deal, afraid that gambling licenses wouldn't be issued and the family would lose their investment. A few years later, this group sold a piece of their investment to John Angersola, (Note: Angelo Lonardo refers to him as "John King" in his testimony before a United States Senate subcommittee in 1987. "John King" was an alias of John Angersola.) Frank Milano, and Alfred Polizzi. Polizzi agreed to prevent other organized crime figures from interfering with the casino and in return became a "silent partner" in the casino. Profits skimmed from the casino continued to flow to the Polizzi and the Cleveland crime family until Howard Hughes purchased the Desert Inn in 1967. Polizzi continued to receive part of the "skim" even in retirement, about $1,000 to $2,000 ($9,923 to $19,846 in 2025 dollars) a month. U.S. Senate investigators and former mafia members said Polizzi also invested secretly in the Stardust Resort and Casino. He shared in the $50,000 ($500,000 in 2025 dollars) a month cut with John Angersola and John T. Scalish, a practice that continued into the mid-1960s.

Polizzi was also suspected of running several illegal gambling rackets and assisting traffickers in illegal narcotics while living in Florida. He openly associated with organized crime figures such as Tony Accardo, Anthony "Little Augie Pisano" Carfano, Charles Fischetti, Rocco Fischetti, Vincent Mangano, Joe Massei, and Harry "Nig" Rosen.

Polizzi himself strenuously denied that he was engaged in anything illegal. After Look magazine ran an article on organized crime which mentioned Polizzi, he sued the magazine for libel in June 1950 and demanded $500,000 ($6,690,871.36929 in 2025 dollars) in damages.

=== 1951 Senate testimony ===
The United States Senate Special Committee to Investigate Crime in Interstate Commerce held hearings in Cleveland, Ohio, in January 1951. Among area organized crime figures testifying where Alvin Giesey, Thomas J. McGinty, Arthur McBride, and Anthony Milano. Alfred Polizzi also testified after being subpoenaed by the committee. Polizzi's initial testimony before the committee was so vague and lacking in details that the committee threatened to pursue perjury and contempt of Congress charges against him. Polizzi voluntarily agreed to testify again.

In testimony before the committee on February 19, 1951, Polizzi admitted to bootlegging during Prohibition and to having had a substantial ownership interest in Buckeye Catering, which at one time controlled 25 percent of the illegal slot machine business in northeast Ohio. He denied having had any involvement in casinos, and claimed to have left organized crime in 1938. Polizzi also told the committee that he had invested his earnings in real estate development, which included the Sands Hotel in Miami Beach, Florida. He said he had earned about $130,000 ($1,612,500 in 2025 dollars) over the past six years.

== Death ==
Alfred Polizzi died on May 26, 1975, in Denver, Colorado, while attending his granddaughter's college graduation. His funeral was held at St. Augustine Catholic Church in Coral Gables, and he was buried at Our Lady of Mercy Catholic Cemetery in Doral, Florida.

== Personal life ==
Polizzi became a naturalized citizen on June 8, 1928. The federal government sued in June 1939 to have his naturalization annulled on the grounds that he had lied about having no previous arrests. The suit was unexpectedly dropped in November. Polizzi sought a federal pardon from President Harry S. Truman in October 1949, but it was denied. He sought a pardon from President Dwight D. Eisenhower in March 1953, but again the pardon was denied. The federal government sought to strip him again of his citizenship in 1952, but a court ruled against the government in December 1953.

Alfred Polizzi married Philomena Valentino, a second cousin of the wife of Anthony Milano. Mobster Peter Licavoli, younger brother of Thomas J. Licavoli, was best man at their wedding. The couple had three children: sons Raymond (b. 1932) and Nicholas (b. 1935), and daughter Joanne.

Alfred Polizzi used a number of aliases during his career. "Big Al" was the most common nickname, because at 5 feet 10 inches (1.78 m) in height he was the tallest of all his friends and criminal associates. He was also known as "Albert Allen" and by variations on his own name (e.g., "Al Polizzi").

== Bibliography ==
- Balboni, Alan (1999). "Moe Dalitz: Controversial Founding Father of Modern Las Vegas". In Davies, Richard O. (ed.). The Maverick Spirit: Building the New Nevada. Reno, Nev.: University of Nevada Press. ISBN 9780874173277.
- Block, Alan A. (1994). "Organized Crime: History and Historiography". In Kelly, Robert J.; Chin, Ko-Lin; Schatzberg, Rufus (eds.). Handbook of Organized Crime in the United States. Westport, Conn.: Greenwood Press. ISBN 9780313283666.
- Bureau of Narcotics (2007). Mafia: The Government's Secret File on Organized Crime. New York: HarperCollins. ISBN 9780061363856.
- Burbank, Jeff (2006). Las Vegas Babylon: True Tales of Glitter, Glamour, and Greed. London: Robson Books. ISBN 9781861059666.
- Burnstein, Scott M. (2006). Motor City Mafia: A Century of Organized Crime in Detroit. Charleston, S.C.: Arcadia Publishing. ISBN 9780738540849.
- Capeci, Jerry (2004). The Complete Idiot's Guide to the Mafia. Indianapolis: Alpha Books. ISBN 9781592573059.
- Casillo, Robert (2006). Gangster Priest: The Italian American Cinema of Martin Scorsese. Toronto: University of Toronto Press. ISBN 9780802094032.
- Fried, Albert (1993). The Rise and Fall of the Jewish Gangster in America. New York: Columbia University Press. ISBN 9780231096829.
- Griffin, Joe; DeNevi, Don (2002). Mob Nemesis: How the FBI Crippled Organized Crime. Amherst, N.Y.: Prometheus Books. ISBN 9781573929196.
- Hart, F. Leslie; Fisher, Harry Johnstone (1971). Modern Food Analysis. Berlin: Springer-Verlag. ISBN 9783540051268.
- Jacobs, James B.; Panarella, Christopher; Worthington, Jay (1996). Busting the Mob: United States. New York: New York University Press. ISBN 9780814742303.
- Kerr, Kathel Austin (1973). The Politics of Moral Behavior. Reading, Mass.: Addison-Wesley.
- Marquis Who's Who (1981). Who's Who in Finance and Industry. Volume 22. Chicago: Marquis Who's Who.
- Messick, Hank (1967). The Silent Syndicate. New York: Macmillan.
- Nelli, Humbert S. (1976). The Business of Crime: Italians and Syndicate Crime in the United States. Chicago: University of Chicago Press. ISBN 9780226571324.
- Newton, Michael (2007). Mr. Mob: The Life and Crimes of Moe Dalitz. Jefferson, N.C.: McFarland & Co. ISBN 9780786435166.
- Permanent Subcommittee on Investigations (1988). 25 Years After Valachi. Committee on Government Operations. United States Senate. 100th Cong., 2d sess. S. HRG.; 100-906. Washington, D.C.: U.S. Government Printing Office. hdl:2027/mdp.39015028778994.
- Porrello, Rick (1995). The Rise and Fall of the Cleveland Mafia: Corn, Sugar, and Blood. New York: Barricade Books. ISBN 9781569800584.
- Potter, Gary W.; Barker, Thomas; Meglen, Jenna (2008). Wicked Newport: Kentucky's Sin City. Charleston, S.C.: History Press. ISBN 9781596295490.
- Roth, Mitchel P. (2017). Global Organized Crime: A 21st Century Approach. New York: Routledge. ISBN 9781138639478.
- Schwarz, Ted (2010). Shocking Stories of the Cleveland Mob. Charleston, S.C.: History Press. ISBN 9781596299184.
- Sifakis, Carl (2005). The Mafia Encyclopedia. New York: Checkmark Books. ISBN 9780816056958.
- Sonnichsen, C.L. (1987). Tucson, the Life and Times of an American City. Norman, Okla.: University of Oklahoma Press. ISBN 9780806120423.
- Special Committee to Investigate Organized Crime in Interstate Commerce (1951). Investigation of Organized Crime in Interstate Commerce. Part 1. United States Senate. 81st Cong., 2d. sess. Washington, D.C.: U.S. Government Printing Office. hdl:2027/uc1.$b643193.
- Special Committee to Investigate Organized Crime in Interstate Commerce (1951). Investigation of Organized Crime in Interstate Commerce. Part 6. United States Senate. 82d Cong., 1st sess. Washington, D.C.: U.S. Government Printing Office. hdl:2027/uc1.$b643196.
- Special Committee to Investigate Organized Crime in Interstate Commerce (1951). Investigation of Organized Crime in Interstate Commerce. Part 7. United States Senate. 81st Cong., 2d sess. Washington, D.C.: U.S. Government Printing Office. hdl:2027/uiug.30112004468697.
- Tenkotte, Paul A.; Claypool, James C. (2009). The Encyclopedia of Northern Kentucky. Lexington, Ky.: University Press of Kentucky. ISBN 9780813125657.
