= Joe Massei =

US gangster involved in bootleg liquor, illegal gambling and money laundering

Joseph D. Massei
- Born: 1899; Detroit, Michigan, U.S.
- Died: May 1971 (aged 71); Miami Beach, Florida, U.S.
- Other name: "Little Joe"
- Occupation: Gangster

Joseph D. Massei (1899 – May 1971), or Joe Massey, was an American gangster of Italian-Irish origins. He was involved in the Detroit bootleg liquor trade in the Prohibition era and was arrested many times, but was only imprisoned once. In 1936 he moved to Miami Beach, Florida, and became a central figure in illegal gambling. He was a consiglieri of the mob, and helped resolve disputes between the gangsters. He acted as the Detroit mob's money man, funneling illegal earnings into legitimate businesses in Miami. He died at home in Miami Beach at the age of 71.

== Detroit ==
Joe Massei was born in 1899 to Daniel Massei, an Italian immigrant, and Margaret Daisey from Ireland. He joined the Mafia as a "soldier". He was arrested in Detroit on charges of armed robbery on May 24, 1920, and August 11, 1921, but was discharged on both occasions. He was arrested for suspected involvement in a murder on August 31, 1925, but was discharged. In 1930 Massei was named Public Enemy #1 in Detroit. In 1931 he and Peter Licavoli of Detroit were to stand trial for murder, but the chief witness for the prosecution vanished at the last minute. In 1932 he was identified as one of the "people in Canada" who were funding shipments of liquor across Lake Erie to the United States. On June 15, 1932, the gangster Ezra Milford Jones was shot dead at the bar of the Stork Club in Detroit, an exclusive speakeasy. Massei and Pete Licavoli were among the Italian mobsters identified as being present.

Massei was arrested for murder again on February 3, 1933, but was dismissed by the court on May 15, 1934. In 1933 Massei was convicted by a jury of carrying concealed weapons. He was sentenced to 60 days for contempt of court in September 1933, which he served in the Wayne County Jail, Detroit. In August 1934 the Toronto Star reported that Massei was suspected of a recent kidnapping of John Sackville Labatt, president of the Labatt Brewing Company, a charge that he indignantly denied. On October 4, 1934, Massei, Charles Bracco, and Joe Bommarito left a Detroit club at 2:30am with the gambling kingpin Gerald Jimmy Hayes. Hayes was found dead later, beaten and shot in the head but not robbed.

== Miami Beach ==
Massei moved to Miami Beach and in March 1936 registered with the police as a convicted felon. He seems to have maintained his links with Detroit mobsters running the numbers racket such as Peter Licavoli, William Tocco and Joe Zirilli. It was said that due to his ability to avoid conviction he had been given the status of "Counselor" (consiglieri) by the mob, and later served as a mediator in disputes. Apparently he was the "money man" of the Detroit mob, investing the profits from criminal activities in Miami hotels, bistros and casinos. He owned the Miami Provision Co., which was apparently a legitimate business, and sent Christmas turkeys to Miami Beach policemen he favored. The Miami Provision Company supplied groceries and meat to hotels on the Gold Coast. Massei was also involved in running gambling dens.

Massei was arrested for vagrancy in January 1937 and again in February 1940, but in both cases was quickly released. Until the fall of 1947 he owned a house in Miami Beach on Pine Tree Drive. He then moved to the Grand Hotel in Miami Beach, a haunt of hoodlums and gambling operators such as Joe Adonis, Anthony Carfano, Charles Fischetti, Jake Guzik and Ralph Buglio from Chicago. Massei lived in a penthouse on the Grand Hotel on 23rd street, and owned property on Flamingo Waterway. He was known in Miami as "the leader of the Detroit Purple Gang". Massei was a friend of Moe Dalitz, but the two denied any business relationship. Massei used to joke with Dalitz, offering to make him a member of the Mafia if Dalitz would make him a member of the Purple Gang. Massei became one of the leaders of a national gambling consortium, along with Meyer Lansky, Alfred Polizzi, Joe Sonken and others. In 1946 Massei was one of the regular visitors to Al Capone's estate on Palm Island, as were Lansky, Tony Accardo, Jimmy Doyle and Joseph Fischetti. Capone died there in January 1947.

When the Desert Inn opened in Las Vegas on April 24, 1950, Massei was among the mafiosi attendees, as were William Tocco, Sam Maceo, Peter Licavoli and Frank Milano. They kept a low profile as did Dalitz, who was also present. Massei was arrested for the last time in a downtown Detroit motel in 1952 when police broke up a formal meeting of leading gambling operators. The Chicago Crime Commission records include a memorandum dated February 13, 1953 that reported "... that information was received that Leonard Patrick, Dave Yaras, and Joe Massei, the latter formerly of Detroit, had been operating the Sans Souci gambling establishment in Havana, Cuba." On February 8, 1959, the Miami Herald ran a story on a fight at Sonny's Restaurant on 23rd street in which Dave Yaras, who was out on bail for a Miami Beach holdup, had beaten an unidentified Cuban with a pistol butt. Joe Massei was on the scene, and greeted the six policemen who turned up to investigate. No police report was filed and the Herald reporter could not get any clear information on what had happened.

On June 18, 1971, the FBI confirmed that Joseph D. "Little Joe" Massei had died at his Miami Beach home. His funeral had been attended by many members of the underworld including William Tocco of Detroit and George Joseph Angersola of Cleveland.

== Sources ==
- Buchanan, Edna (9 September 2014), Never Let Them See You Cry, Diversion Books, ISBN 978-1-62681-249-9
- Davies, Richard O. (1999), The Maverick Spirit: Building the New Nevada, University of Nevada Press, ISBN 978-0-87417-327-7
- Dickson, Kenneth R. (16 December 2008), "Part 10: Toledo gambling boss shot dead in Detroit", The Blade (Toledo)
- Jewett, Paul N. (2010), The Mob and the Flock, Xulon Press, ISBN 978-1-61379-770-9
- "Joseph Massei". Reocities. Archived from the original on 5 March 2016.
- Kavieff, Paul R. (30 June 2008), Detroit's Infamous Purple Gang, Arcadia Publishing, ISBN 978-1-4396-1926-1
- Miller, Gene (8 February 1959), "Beating? Nobody's Talkin' Hoods Mum; Police Silent", Miami Herald
- Newton, Michael (23 April 2009), Mr. Mob: The Life and Crimes of Moe Dalitz, McFarland, ISBN 978-0-7864-5362-7
- Pashley, Nicholas (1 August 2010), Cheers!: A History of Beer in Canada, HarperCollins Canada, ISBN 978-1-4434-0166-1
- Peterson, Virgil (7 July 1950), Testimony to Kefauver Committee, U.S. Senate Special Committee to Investigate Organized Crime in Interstate Commerce
- Russo, Gus (12 December 2008), Supermob: How Sidney Korshak and His Criminal Associates Became America's Hidden Power Brokers, Bloomsbury Publishing, ISBN 978-1-59691-898-6
- Salerno, Ralph (1979), "xi . Leonard Patrick" (PDF), HSCA Appendix to Hearings, vol. IX, House Select Committee on Assassinations (HSCA)
- UPI (18 June 1971), "FBI Confirms Death of Mafia's 'Little Joe'", Port Charlotte Daily Herald News, Miami
