= Thomas Joseph McGinty =

American mobster (1892–1970)

Thomas Joseph McGinty, commonly known as Thomas Jefferson McGinty, (aka T.J. McGinty and Thomas "Blackjack" McGinty, 1892 - 1970) was an early Cleveland mobster, one of the city's largest bootleggers during Prohibition, as well as a longtime boxing promoter.

A former professional boxer, McGinty was hired as muscle for The Plain Dealer's circulation department and, by 1913, headed a gang of labor sluggers competing against rival Cleveland News sluggers the Mayfield Road Mob under Arthur McBride during Cleveland's "Circulation Wars".

McGinty operated McGinty's Saloon on West 25th Street with two relatives, McGinty was indicted by a federal grand jury in 1924 on charges of operating a "gigantic wholesale and retail conspiracy". Although initially in hiding, McGinty turned himself in after several days and, pleading not guilty, he was convicted and sentenced to 18 months imprisonment. After his release from Atlanta Federal Penitentiary, he soon resumed his bootlegging activities without further interference from authorities (who may have been paid off by McGinty). U.S. Attorney A.E. Bernstein stated McGinty was the "King of the Ohio Bootleggers." During the 1930s and 1940s, McGinty operated gaming halls on West 25th Street and the Mounds Club in Lake County.

McGinty was a member of the Cleveland Syndicate, which included Jewish gangsters Moe Dalitz, Maurice Kleinman, Louis Rothkopf, Sam Tucker and Charles Polizzi, the adopted brother of Alfred Polizzi, head of the Italian Mayfield Road Mob. The Syndicate's gaming operations were located in Youngstown, Ohio, Covington, Kentucky, Newport, Kentucky and as far away as Florida. McGinty and other members of the Syndicate were stockholders of the Las Vegas casino Desert Inn during the 1950s. He was also involved in Meyer Lansky's Hotel Nacional in Havana, Cuba .

McGinty held an interest in numerous race tracks, including Maple Heights, Fair Grounds Race Course, Thistledown Racecourse, Fairmount Park Racetrack, Aurora Downs, and the Agua Caliente Racetrack. McGinty testified before the Kefauver Committee about the Cleveland Syndicate and organized crime.
