= Joseph Lonardo =

Boss of the Cleveland Mafia (1884–1927)

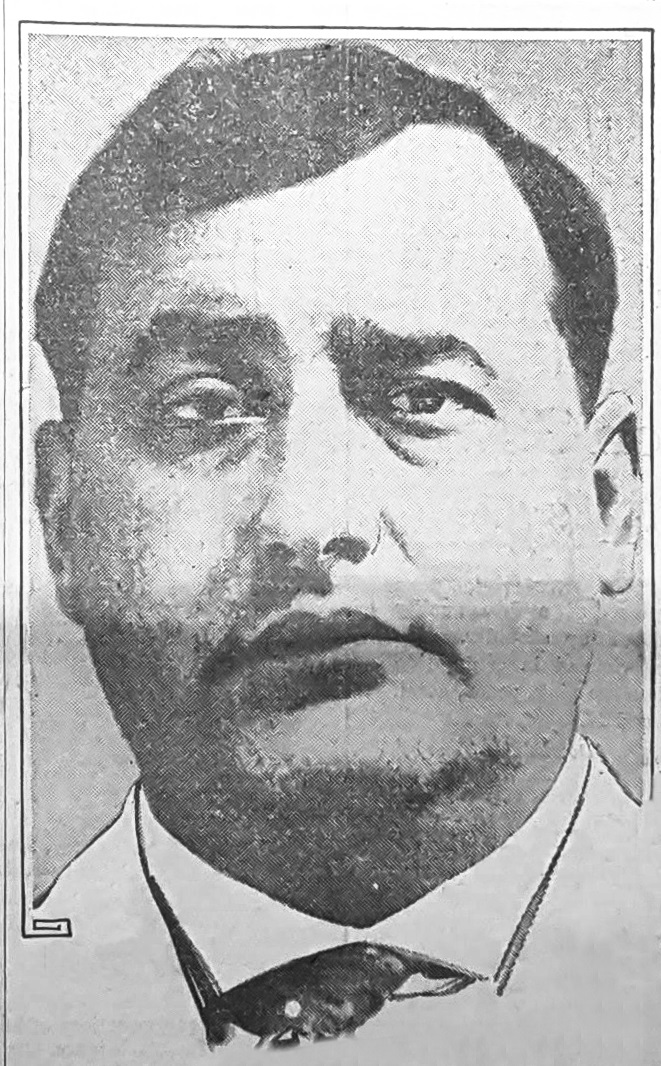
- Born: October 20, 1884; Licata, Sicily, Italy
- Died: October 13, 1927 (aged 42); Cleveland, Ohio, U.S.
- Cause of death: Gun shots
- Resting place: Calvary Cemetery, Cleveland
- Other name: Big Joe
- Citizenship: American
- Occupations: Sugar merchant, crime boss
- Successor: Salvatore Todaro
- Spouses: Concetta Paragone (m. 1902; sep. 1925) Fannie Lanzone (m. 1925; sep. 1927)
- Children: 5, including Angelo
- Allegiance: Cleveland crime family

Joseph Lonardo (Italian pronunciation: [loˈnardo]; October 20, 1884 – October 13, 1927), also known as "Big Joe", was an Italian mobster in the United States, who became the first crime boss of the Cleveland crime family, which he structured from a number of competing organized crime gangs. When national Prohibition began in 1920, Lonardo became a dealer in corn sugar, an essential ingredient in the manufacture of corn whiskey. Lonardo became a "sugar baron" by driving other legitimate corn sugar merchants out of business, encouraging home distillation, and using intimidation, murder, and theft to eliminate or drive his criminal competitors out of business.

Lonardo transformed his gang, the Mayfield Road Mob, into a powerful organized crime family. He had the support of the D'Aquila crime family of New York City, and engaged in widespread bribery of local judges, police, and politicians. His criminal organization's reliance on low-quality corn whiskey led to a drop in revenues when consumers began favoring better quality, illegally imported liquor. He began demanding unquestioning loyalty while taking little risk, alienating many bootleggers, home distillers, and organized crime figures.

Lonardo's control of the Cleveland mafia was usurped in 1927 by underboss Salvatore "Black Sam" Todaro and the Porrello brothers while Lonardo was out of the country. When Lonardo returned to Cleveland, he attempted to regain control of the Cleveland mafia. His bodyguards were arrested as suspects in the Yorkell and Brownstein murders, leaving Lonardo unprotected. On October 13, 1927, he was murdered in a Porrello barber shop, likely on the orders of "Black Sam" Todaro. His death sparked Cleveland's Corn Sugar War.

== Early life ==
Lonardo was born October 20, 1884, in Licata, Sicily, to Antonia (née Verdi) and Angelo Lonardo. (Note: His father's name is sometimes spelled Angielo. His mother's name is also given as Antoinette Vedda.) He had three brothers, Dominic, Frank, and John, and a sister. Angelo Porrello operated a sulfur mine near Licata, and the four Lonardo sons worked alongside Porrello's seven sons in the mine.

Lonardo emigrated from Italy to the United States, entering the country on February 4, 1901. He settled in New York City's Little Italy neighborhood, and his three brothers and his sister emigrated to the United States soon thereafter.

Lonardo moved to Cleveland, Ohio, in 1905, living on La Grange Avenue in the Hough neighborhood, then at 923 Orange Avenue by 1916, and then a few years later to E. 38th Street in the Central neighborhood. He became a naturalized citizen on August 14, 1914. Lonardo worked in various commission houses at first, (Note: E. 38th Street and Woodland Avenue was known as the "commission house district". It was where manufacturers and producers of beef, flowers, poultry, small merchandise (like countertop home appliances, clocks, and watches), and fruits and vegetables would sell their goods to an intermediary known as a "commission house", which in turn sold them to retailers. The intermediary received a commission for this service. Large numbers of intermediaries had no warehouse, but instead operated from small trays, temporary sidewalk stands, or carts. These were "curbside merchants". Motorists could drive up, pause at the curb, peruse the items for sale, and make a quick cash purchase.) then sold fruit for a living, and later opened a confectionery. By the early 1920s, his brothers Frank and John and family friend Salvatore "Black Sam" Todaro were working in the business. Many members of the Porrello family had also emigrated to the U.S. and settled in Cleveland. Among these was Joseph Porrello, who found work in Lonardo's confectionery business. By at least 1924, Lonardo had also partnered with Todaro in opening a grocery store.

== Criminal career ==
Lonardo and his brothers were originally legitimate businessmen, but they soon branched out into extortion and robbery. Lonardo's criminal career began soon after he arrived in Cleveland. He was convicted of aggravated assault in 1906 for stabbing a man, and imprisoned for 22 months in the Ohio State Reformatory. (Note: Another source says he only spent a year in prison.) Shortly after his release, he was arrested for (but not charged with) robbery. He was accused of robbery in 1909 but not indicted. He shot and killed a man during an argument in 1916, but a grand jury declined to indict him. Police suspected he was involved in a number of robberies and by 1924 believed he had also committed two murders, but he was never arrested for any of these alleged crimes.

About 1913, a loosely organized Italian American gang known as the Mayfield Road Mob formed in Cleveland's Little Italy neighborhood. The protection racket was the core business of the Mayfield Road Mob at first. Lonardo's criminal activities were limited to small-time crimes, but once Prohibition began, he and his brothers began taking over the Mayfield Road Mob and organizing it, turning it into the dominant criminal organization in Cleveland.

=== Rise during early Prohibition ===
Prohibition began in Ohio on May 27, 1919, and nationally throughout the United States on January 16, 1920. Once stockpiles of alcohol were consumed, the brewing of beer and distillation of liquor at home increased exponentially in the first few years of Prohibition. (Note: Although the smuggling of liquor into the country also occurred, it became more common than home brewing and distillation only after 1923.) By 1920, Lonardo was so well-regarded nationally by other organized crime families that Buffalo underboss Angelo Palmeri asked Lonardo to be godfather to his daughter.

The start of Prohibition also saw the formation of the Cleveland Syndicate. Formed by Moe Dalitz, Maurice Kleinman, Louis Rothkopf, and Sam Tucker, the Cleveland Syndicate was a group of Jewish mobsters based in Cleveland and Akron who engaged in bootlegging, gambling, and smuggling luxury goods, among other things. The Cleveland Syndicate preferred to give a cut of its profits to mobsters in other criminal organizations, who then did the actual work of bootlegging or running the gambling operations. The Cleveland Syndicate dominated bootlegging in Cleveland during the early days of Prohibition, but swiftly partnered with the Mayfield Road Mob—which did most (but not all) of the bootlegging for the Syndicate. The Mayfield Road Mob's bootlegging operation moved large amounts of high-quality liquor from Canada into northeast Ohio and northwest Pennsylvania, generating substantial profits for those involved.

Beginning in 1924, Lonardo began a campaign of intimidation and murder to win control of the majority of bootlegging in northeast Ohio. The barriers to entry into the illegal liquor industry were low, which meant that Lonardo could reduce, but not entirely eliminate, the competition. Lonardo relied on several associates in his effort, including Salvatore "Black Sam" Todaro, his top lieutenant; Frank Milano, one of the top leaders in the Mayfield Road Mob; and gangsters John Angersola, Charles Colletti, Lawrence Lupo, and Charles Russo. Salvatore "Sam" Tilocco and Porrello also became part of the Lonardo crime family, and Porrello rose to a position of some prominence in the organization.

=== Sugar baron years: 1925–26 ===
In 1925, with pre-Prohibition stockpiles of alcohol exhausted, corn whiskey—which had been manufactured on a small scale—became the illegal liquor of choice in northeast Ohio. (Note: Ohio Prohibition enforcement officials estimated that by May 1921, there were more than 30,000 illegal brewing and distillation operations in Ohio, up from about 100 prior to enactment of the law. Most of these brewed beer; one in four families were making beer at home in violation of the law.) Corn sugar (Note: Corn sugar is created by treating corn starch slurry with hydrochloric acid and then heating the mixture under pressure for several minutes. When filtered, clarified, concentrated, and seeded with a few dextrose crystals, the mixture can be poured into shallow pans where it will crystallize. It is generally sold in slabs, as pellets, or in chips.) was key to the manufacture of corn whiskey. Corn whiskey was usually made with cornmeal or unground corn mixed with rye as the mash. Corn sugar could not only be substituted for grain as the mash ingredient but also permitted faster production of the final liquor. Control of the corn sugar industry as well as the distribution of illegal liquor was critical to anyone seeking to dominate the illegal liquor industry.

Lonardo essentially established a cottage industry in the production of illegal corn whiskey. (Note: Before Prohibition, Cleveland had between 1,000 and 1,200 bars, almost all of them legal, and the home manufacture of illegal liquor was negligible. By 1923, there were more than 10,000 illegal home distillation operations run by as many as 30,000 Clevelanders. They provided liquor to the city's 2,500 to 3,000 speakeasies. Another 100,000 Clevelanders made liquor at home, but didn't sell it—using it only for themselves and their friends.) He and his brothers used their profits from previous criminal activities to invest heavily in corn sugar manufacturing, a completely legal enterprise. They purchased a warehouse located at Woodland Avenue and E. 9th Street. (Note: The warehouse was probably a half-block south of Woodland, as contemporary sources say it was located at E. 9th and Decatur Court.) Todaro ran the warehouse, oversaw the bookkeeping, and assisted home brewers in obtaining and setting up stills. (Note: Todaro entered Lonardo employ as a truck driver in 1923. He was swiftly promoted to salesman, and then manager of the warehouse. The Volstead Act, enacted to implement Prohibition, did not bar the sale of small stills, which often sold in hardware stores for $6 ($96 in 2025 dollars). Stills could also be easily assembled at home from common items such as copper teakettles, coffee percolators, and even large metal garbage cans.) Frank Lonardo oversaw the collection of the corn whiskey and its distribution to buyers. Lonardo sold corn sugar sold to home distillers, who in turn sold their corn whiskey to the Mayfield Road Mob. The mob, in turn, sold the alcohol at high prices to local speakeasies. Lonardo offered his corn sugar customers easy credit, which encouraged expansion in home distilling and drove most legitimate corn sugar merchants out of business. The cottage industry system dispersed distillation operations so that no single raid by law enforcement could seriously interrupt production. The cottage industry system also created few opportunities for law enforcement aggrandizement. The vast majority of home distillers used by Lonardo were immigrants, and few law enforcement officers wanted the media to depict them breaking into the homes of poor immigrants. By 1925, law enforcement recognized that home distilling had become so widespread it was now an industrial concern.

The corn sugar industry generated immense wealth for the Lonardos. (Note: There were rumors in Cleveland at the time that Lonardo's net worth was $1 million ($18,200,000 in 2025 dollars), and that he had money in ten different local banks.) Lonardo's personal profits from the industry were estimated at $5,000 ($100,000 in 2025 dollars) a week. He became Cleveland's first "corn sugar baron", and this in turn allowed him to become boss of the Mayfield Road Mob within just a few years. Lonardo then began to use intimidation and murder to force other corn sugar dealers and purchasers of home-distilled liquor out of business. Tactics included hijacking other people's liquor shipments, stealing liquor from warehouses rented by other gangs, or tipping off the police about where liquor was stored or how it was being moved. The Mayfield Road Mob killed so many small-time corn sugar merchants, distillers, and bootleggers that police claimed hit men were charging a flat fee of $25 ($470 in 2025 dollars) per murder. (Note: The Mayfield Road Mob dumped so many dead bodies at the intersection of Woodland Avenue and E. 25th Street, often in broad daylight, that the press called this "the Bloody Corner".) Lonardo used the same tactics to discourage home distillers from selling liquor directly to speakeasies, and to encourage retailers to sell liquor at the highest possible price. When his better corn sugar customers ran into trouble with the law, Lonardo often donated money for attorneys and bail. As law enforcement improved, the Mayfield Road Mob strengthened its organization and promoted gangsters with stronger personalities and more talent to leadership positions within the mob. Lonardo and his organization also began the widespread bribery of judges, police, and politicians.

The Mayfield Road Mob's influence was not limited to Cleveland. In Akron, a large industrial city 40 miles (64 km) to the south, Frank Bellini and Michael Corcelli controlled the imported illegal liquor and home distilling operations (but not corn sugar sales). The Akron mob owed its allegiance to Lonardo.

=== Boss of the Cleveland crime family ===
The political economist Dennis M.P. McCarthy suggests that the Cleveland mafia went through three stages: An initial stage, where rival gangs and families contended with one another for power; a second stage, when these gangs sometimes cooperated and sometimes competed; and a third stage, where a powerful boss dominated all the gangs and families and the mafia acted more like a unitary organization. The Mayfield Road Mob under Lonardo, he concludes, is typical of the initial stage. (Note: The emerging Porrello gang was not the only one the Mayfield Road Mob was competing with. The Collinwood Crew operated in Cleveland's Collinwood neighborhood at the same time that the Mayfield Road Mob was emerging. The two gangs sometimes worked in competition, sometimes apart but not in competition, and sometimes in cooperation.) The distinctiveness of the Mayfield Road Mob as a crime family is supported by mafioso Nicola Gentile, who called the group predominio dei licatesi (dominance of those from Licata).

Lonardo and the Mayfield Road Mob had become so dominant in Cleveland that other mafia families began to take interest in what was happening in the city. Prohibition also encouraged the much more powerful New York City mafia organizations to seek alliances with crime families in other cities to ensure reliable and large supplies of illegal liquor. Among the many friends Lonardo made while living briefly in New York City were several who later became important mafioso, including Nicola "Uncle Cola" Gentile (a powerful mafia figure who played a major role in peacekeeping among crime families and helped create The Commission in 1931) and Salvatore "Toto" D'Aquila. (Note: Lonardo had assisted Gentile in moving bootleg liquor in Cleveland in 1920; now, Gentile attempted to persuade Lonardo to support a national commission of bosses to adjudicate disputes between crime families. Lonardo declined to support the initiative.) D'Aquila, who was rapidly expanding his influence in New York City and was heavily involved in bootlegging, began supporting Lonardo in his efforts to establish himself as the sole boss in Cleveland. According to Gentile, Lonardo "worshipped" D'Aquila "like a god" and was one of D'Aquila's most avid supporters even though D'Aquila tended to murder any of his associates who grew too rich and powerful.

Through his domination of the corn sugar and corn whiskey industries and with the support of the D'Aquila crime family, Todaro, and the Porrello brothers, Lonardo became the first known boss of the Cleveland crime family. (Note: Technically, Lonardo was only head of the Sicilian mafia in Cleveland, not mafia organizations from other areas like Florence, Milan, Naples, Rome, or Venice. These other Italian organized crime groups either had no presence in Cleveland or were completely dominated by the Sicilian mob.) Lonardo was generally regarded as an effective boss. He overcame resistance to his criminal activities by maintaining good relationships with people in Little Italy (the area most affected by his bootlegging), helping to resolve their disputes and donating money to those in need. He was also aware of the precarious position he held. He had several bodyguards, including Charles Colletti and Lawrence Lupo, and he was rarely seen in public without at least one of them by his side.

Lonardo encountered new problems as boss of the Cleveland crime family. Over time, he came to expect that his word would be obeyed without question and without the need to use force. Many of his competitors, as well as some of his subordinates, felt he was becoming arrogant. Problems with bootlegging also cropped up. The corn whiskey cottage industry system did not emphasize quality, and by the mid-1920s many consumers preferred to purchase high-quality liquor illegally imported from Canada. This hurt the market for corn whiskey, reducing criminal profits. Improvements in law enforcement also made many restive with Lonardo's rule. Lonardo demanded a percentage of the profits from the sale of corn whiskey, but appeared to take little risk. As more and more home distillers were jailed, the number of people willing to brew corn whiskey fell (further reducing income). Some distillers attempted to deceive the mob, selling liquor on the side; many of these individuals were murdered. Some sellers of corn whiskey lied about the amount of whiskey they were selling or the amount of profits they were making, depriving Lonardo and the Mayfield Road Mob of revenue. Many of these people were also killed. More and more distillers and distributors of corn whiskey were joining a new Italian American gang run by the Porrellos that had formed near the intersection of Woodland Avenue and E. 55th Street.

== Death ==
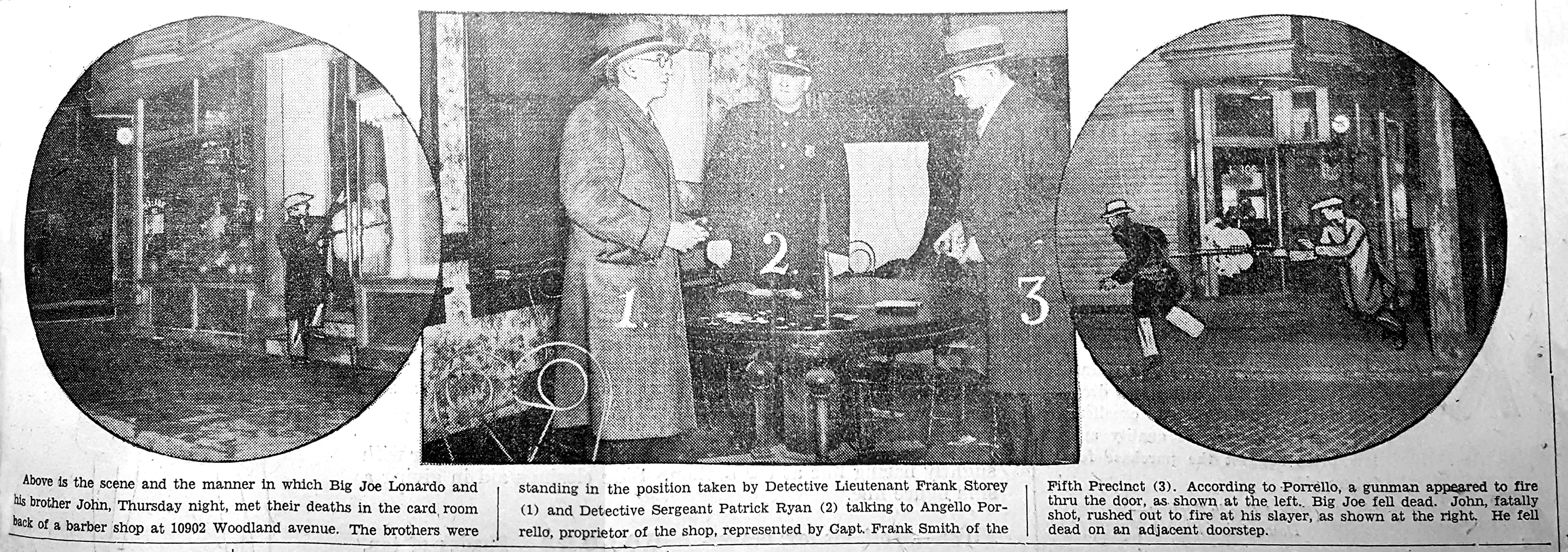
Pastiche of photographs and drawings from The Cleveland Press newspaper indicating the location and manner of Lonardo's death.

=== Changes in support ===
In New York City in the early 1920s, Giuseppe "Joe the Boss" Masseria was contending with D'Aquila for control of organized crime. Masseria began backing challenges to D'Aquila-supported crime families across the country, most notably in Cleveland. (Note: The conflict would end almost a year after Lonardo's death, when D'Aquila was shot dead in New York City on October 10, 1928.) Much of Masseria's extended family lived in Cleveland and his brother was involved in the Mayfield Road Mob, so his interest in the city is not surprising.

In 1924, Porrello and his six brothers pooled their money and began selling corn sugar as well. By 1926, they had purchased several homes and warehouses at the intersection of Woodland Avenue and E. 110th Street, and become wealthy selling corn sugar to distillers. The Porrellos were the only significant corn sugar suppliers other than Lonardo, who had intimidated or eliminated nearly all other competitors. Lonardo tolerated their operation only because the Porrellos were lifelong friends. (Note: Rick Porrello, descendant of Joseph Porrello and a historian of the Cleveland mafia, says that the Lonardo and Porrello brothers regularly played cards together. Lonardo's son and cousin participated in a Porrello wedding, and John Lonardo was a groomsman at Raymond Porrello's wedding.) Todaro, too, was unhappy with Lonardo's rule. Despite largely managing the Lonardo corn sugar business, he had gained little wealth.

After secretly visiting Sicily in April 1926, Lonardo left openly for Sicily in April 1927 for five months to visit his mother. The relationship between Lonardo and the Porrellos worsened while he was away. Law enforcement officials had identified a Porrello-owned barber shop at 10902 Woodland Avenue as a front for the sale of large orders of corn whiskey and, following a sting in early 1927, Raymond Porrello was arrested. He was convicted of various violations of liquor laws and for threatening a law enforcement officer and sentenced to jail. Joseph Porrello allegedly tried to bribe officials to win Raymond's release, and failed. He then asked Lonardo for help. Lonardo agreed to use his political influence, although Porrello had to pay him $5,000 ($100,000 in 2025 dollars). Lonardo either took no action or failed to win Raymond Porrello's release before he left.

John Lonardo served as caretaker of Joseph's businesses while Joseph was in Sicily. John had little temperament for business and lacked good judgment, and a leadership vacuum emerged in the Mayfield Road Mob. As soon as Joseph Lonardo left for Sicily, the Porrellos began offering home distillers corn sugar at $2.19 per pound ($4.8/kg) ($41 in 2025 dollars), much less than the $3.50 per pound ($7.7/kg) ($65 in 2025 dollars) Lonardo charged. Lonardo's influence with local politicians and police evaporated, and law enforcement raids on home brewers loyal to the Lonardos increased significantly. A Porrello subordinate, Mike Chiapetta, began swiftly building a home brewing network loyal to the Porrellos. Just a few weeks after Lonardo's departure, the Porrellos had taken control of more than half of Lonardo's corn sugar and corn whiskey business.

Lonardo returned to Cleveland in August 1927, and worked hard to put his business back in order. He correctly surmised that Todaro had conspired with the Porrellos to undermine his business, and ejected him from the Mayfield Road Mob. Lonardo then ordered Lawrence Lupo to kill Todaro, ostensibly for abusing a Jew who worked for the mafia. (Note: This individual may have been Charles "Chuck" Polizzi, the Jewish foster younger brother of Mayfield Road Mob member Alfred Polizzi. Chuck Polizzi worked the rackets regularly with Al Polizzi and Lawrence Lupo. Nicola Gentile, however, indicates that the individual was a low-ranking bootlegger, possibly someone running a still.) Nicola Gentile says that Joseph Biondo and Paolino Palmieri (Note: Gentile may be referring to Angelo Palmeri, boss of the Buffalo crime family from 1908 to 1916 and consigliere from 1916 to his death in 1932.) members of the Buffalo crime family, (Note: Known as the Magaddino crime family at the time, this mafia organization was very supportive of Lonardo.) tried to convince Lonardo to rescind the death sentence, but he refused. Gentile finally told Lonardo that if Todaro was murdered without good reason, Gentile would leave Cleveland and never return. The seriousness of Gentile's announcement impressed Lonardo, who rescinded the assassination order the next day. Historian Rick Porrello says Todaro was lucky not to have been killed.

Todaro allied with the Porrellos, where he became suddenly wealthy. Lonardo was allegedly enraged that Todaro refused to acknowledge that he owed his station in life to Lonardo—not the Porrellos. Lonardo, however, was not eager to start a gang war. He met several times with the Porrellos to discuss what was happening, allegedly seeking a merger of the two gangs and their bootleg operations.

=== Yorkell and Brownstein murders ===
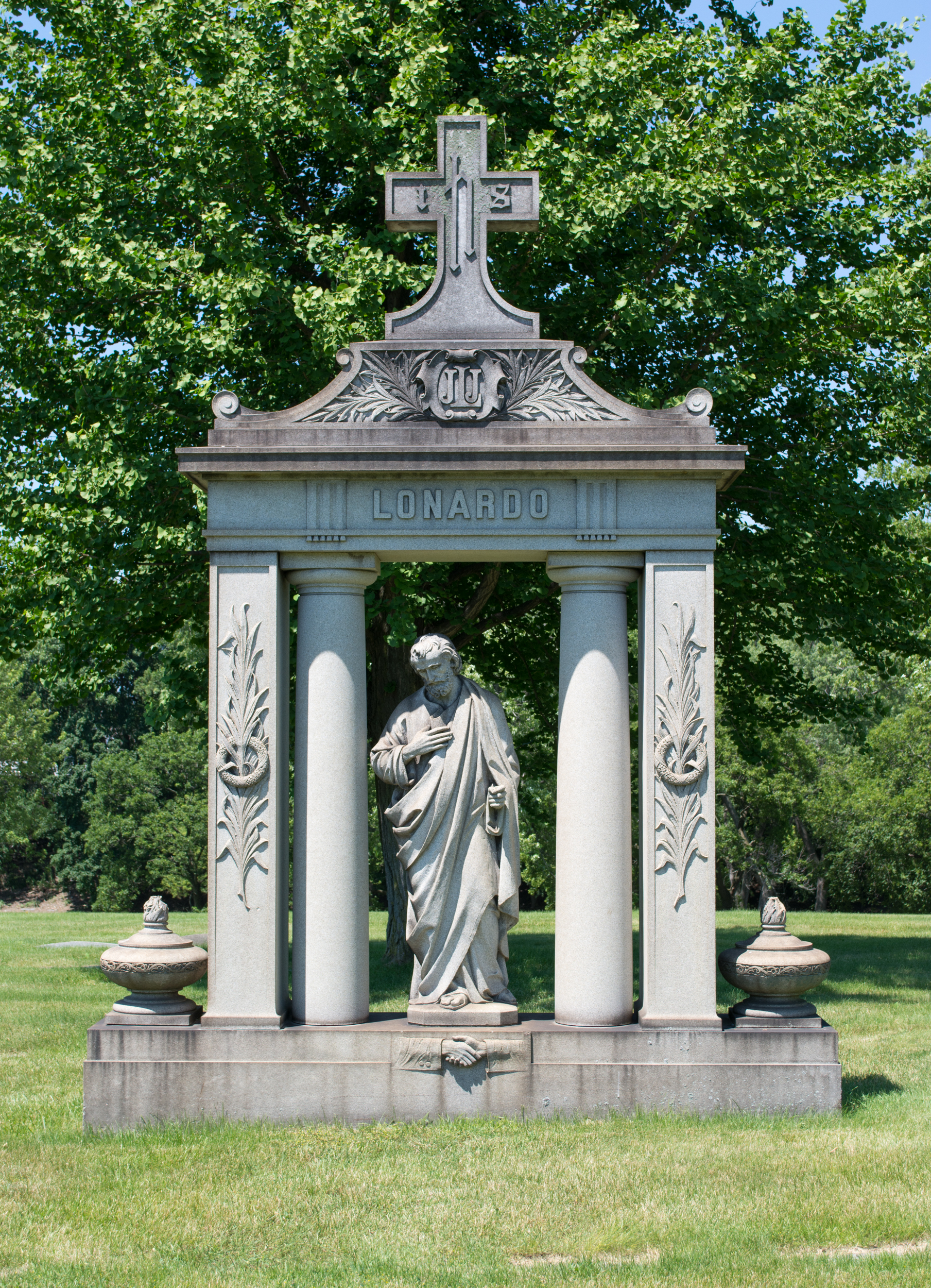
The Lonardo family plot at Calvary Cemetery in Cleveland, Ohio

In September 1927, Ernest J. Yorkell (about 30 years old) and Jack Brownstein (about 25 years old) came to Cleveland. Yorkell had once been a sideshow strongman, nicknamed "Young Hercules." Brownstein had been a small-time robber and thief specializing in jewelry. Almost nothing was known about how the two met and/or where they had operated, except that they had engaged in blackmail in Buffalo, New York, before moving to Cleveland.

After their arrival in Cleveland, Yorkell and Brownstein spent time in local gambling dens, speakeasies, and other places where criminal activity took place. They paid attention to local gossip, learned who the wealthy criminals were, and then attempted to blackmail these gangsters. They allegedly never asked for much money, and never blackmailed a victim twice. On October 7, 1927, Yorkell and Brownstein told witnesses that they intended to hit up a very wealthy local crime boss for $5,000 ($100,000 in 2025 dollars). (Note: Early reports were that the two blackmailers intended to ask for only $2,000.) They did not mention the name of their intended victim, but local newspapers and historians widely believe that they wanted to blackmail Lonardo.

Yorkell and Brownstein's bullet-riddled bodies were found in the early hours of October 8, 1927, at the intersection of East Blvd. (now Martin Luther King Jr. Drive) and North Park Blvd. in Cleveland Heights, less than 0.5 miles (0.80 km) from Lonardo's home and within view of the homes of a number of millionaires. Lonardo was widely believed to have ordered their deaths. Lonardo bodyguards Lawrence Lupo and Charles Colletti were arrested for suspicion in involvement in the Yorkell-Brownstein murders (although both were released in late October).

=== Death at the Porrello barber shop ===
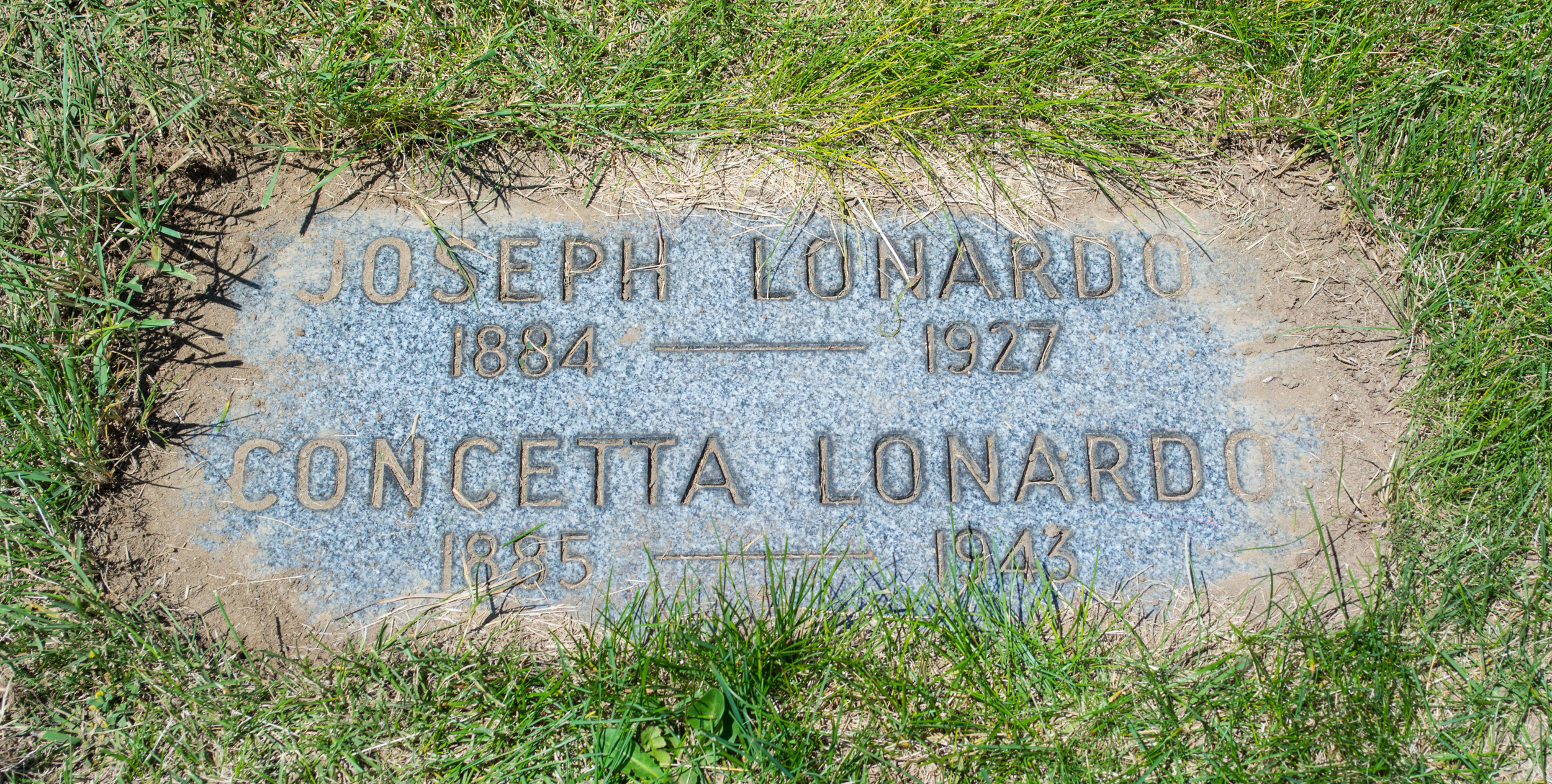
Lonardo's headstone in front of the memorial at the Lonardo family plot in Calvary Cemetery in Cleveland.

Masseria encouraged Todaro to murder Lonardo and take over the Cleveland crime family in order to embarrass Salvatore D'Aquila. (Note: Crime historians Hunt and Tona conclude that Masseria also encouraged the Porrello family to get in on the plot.) Todaro likely ordered the murder of Lonardo, and most likely arranged the meeting at which Lonardo was killed.

Lonardo suspected that his life was in danger. After his return from Sicily, he never entertained at home and rarely ventured out at night. His bodyguards Lupo and Colletti were constantly with him during the day as he conducted his business, but Lonardo was deprived of their services after their arrest in the Yorkell-Brownstein murders.

In the early evening of October 13, 1927, someone telephoned Lonardo and asked him to come to the barber shop owned by Ottavio Porrello at 10902 Woodland Avenue. The caller was never identified, although it appears to have been someone Lonardo trusted. Joseph and John Lonardo arrived at the barber shop without any bodyguards (which was highly unusual) (Note: Bodyguards Lupo and Colletti were still in jail on suspicion of murdering Yorkell and Brownstein.) about 8:15 PM and proceeded into the back room, which was used for playing cards. A few minutes later, (Note: Once source puts the time of the shooting at 8:20 PM. Angelo Porrello told police that at the time that the shooting occurred just after he shook hands with the Lonardos. Another source, published 16 years after the killing, put the time of the shooting at 8:30.) two men entered the card room from the barber shop. (Note: There were two doors leading into the card room, one from the barber shop and one out the rear. Both exits were guarded by Porrello men.) The two men then opened fire. Angelo Porrello, who was in the card room, claims he did not know who the men were and survived only by hiding under the card table. (Note: Angelo Porrello said the gunmen entered from the barber shop. Historian Rick Porrello says the gunmen entered from the rear exit.) Joseph Lonardo was killed instantly. Two bullets entered his skull near his left eye, three bullets entered his left shoulder and upper left arm, and two bullets entered his right side. (Note: Police reported at the time that Joseph Lonardo's clothes were scorched from the gunfire, an indication of how close the gunmen were to him.) John Lonardo was shot in the left leg and stomach. (Note: Lonardo pulled a .32-caliber handgun from a pocket, but dropped it on the card room floor due to shock.) The two gunmen fled out the front door of the barber shop and onto Woodland Avenue. John Lonardo followed them. One of the gunmen stopped in front of Anthony Caruso's butcher shop at 10906 Woodland. When John Lonardo reached him, the gunman hit Lonardo between the eyes with the butt of his pistol. John Lonardo fell unconscious, and bled to death on the sidewalk. (Note: Anthony Caruso, the only eyewitness who claimed he could positively identify the gunmen, was shot several times in the early hours of December 5, 1927, at the garage at 3680 E. 153rd Street where he kept his car. He died 36 hours later.) Police found Joseph Lonardo's will on his body, which led them to suspect that Lonardo knew he was being targeted for death. (Note: He also had $845 ($15,662 in 2025 dollars) in cash in his pockets.)

Joseph and John Lonardo were buried on October 18, 1927. A wake was held at John Lonardo's home at 3269 Warrington Road in Shaker Heights. Several hundred mourners, many from out of town, attended the wake. A procession of about 500 cars followed the hearse to St. Anthony's Catholic Church on E. 13th Street and Carnegie Avenue. (Note: The church, built in 1904, was demolished in 1961 to make way for a freeway.) John and Joseph Lonardo were both buried in silver caskets at Calvary Cemetery in Cleveland.

=== Aftermath ===
Lonardo's death ignited what the press called the "Corn Sugar War", a series of power-grabs and retaliatory blood feuds that left another Lonardo and seven Porrellos dead before it ended. Police in 1927 believed Lonardo's death was only one in a series of five murders recently committed in the city. The name of the conflict is a misnomer, since the struggle for control over Cleveland's corn sugar industry had ended (not begun) with Lonardo's death.

Lawrence Lupo attempted to gain control over Mayfield Road Mob and the Lonardo corn sugar and corn whiskey empire after Lonardo's death but was murdered on May 31, 1928. Salvatore "Black Sam" Todaro is widely believed to have taken over Lonardo's criminal enterprises, becoming the second boss of the Cleveland crime family. (Note: Crime historians Hunt and Tona say that Todaro and Joseph Porrello jointly ran the Mayfield Road Mob after Lonardo's death, but that Todaro was solely responsible for moving the organization into Masseria's camp after Lonardo's murder. Porrello, they say, did not become boss until after Todaro's death. Rick Porrello, grand-nephew of Joseph Porrello, argues that Todaro never became boss. Other historians agree, saying Todaro joined the Porrello faction, and became underboss.)

Todaro was murdered in front of Ottavio Porrello's barber shop on June 11, 1929, by Angelo Lonardo (Joseph Lonardo's son) and Dominic Sospirato (Joseph Lonardo's nephew). Joseph Porrello then took over as boss of the Cleveland crime family.

== Personal life ==
Lonardo was nicknamed "Big Joe" because at 6 feet 2 inches (1.88 m) in height and 300 pounds (140 kg) in weight he was taller and heavier than almost all his peers. For much of his adult life, Lonardo suffered from an unidentified disease in his right eye. At one point in the mid-1920s, he traveled to Boston, Massachusetts, to have surgery on the eye, recuperating afterward at a Massachusetts beach resort. The surgery proved ineffective in the long run, and by the end of his life Lonardo was blind in his right eye.

Once he achieved wealth, Lonardo became well known for being a flashy dresser. He wore expensive tailored suits, closed the cuffs with diamond-studded cufflinks, used a diamond-encrusted tie pin, and wore several diamond rings.

About 1925, Lonardo commissioned local architect J. L. Cameron to design a home for him in Cleveland's Buckeye–Shaker neighborhood. The home, located at 13700 Larchmere Blvd., cost $70,000 to $75,000 ($1,290,000 to $1,380,000 in 2025 dollars).

=== Wives, children, and mistresses ===
Lonardo's common-law wife was Concetta Paragone. (Note: Her name is often spelled Concietta in sources.) She was born in Licata about 1888. Sources differ as to how they became a couple. Some sources say Concetta accompanied Joseph to the United States in 1901. Concetta herself later claimed that she and Lonardo had lived together as man and wife since 1902 (although they never had a civil or religious ceremony). Other sources say that Concetta married a fellow Licatan (either in Sicily or in the United States), and she had three children by him. They were living in Cleveland when Concetta left him in 1906 for Lonardo. All sources agree that the Lonardos had five children: Angelo (b. 1911), Antoinette (b. circa 1914), Frank (b. circa 1917), Dominic (b. circa 1921), and Helen (also known as Ella; b. circa 1922). Angelo "Big Ange" Lonardo was later underboss of the Cleveland crime family from 1976 to 1983. Joseph and Concetta Lonardo separated about 1925, and Concetta died on January 24, 1943, in East Cleveland.

On September 8, 1925, Lonardo married 29-year-old Fannie (or Fanny) Lanzone in Sandusky, Ohio. (Note: Although some sources say her last name was Lansone or Franzone, federal court records list it as Lanzone.) They immediately began living together. Fannie had been widowed only 19 days earlier: Her husband, Angelo Lanzone, attacked her and her 15-year-old daughter, Angelina, with a hatchet. They survived the attack only when Fannie's mother, Frances Damanta, (Note: The spelling of the last name varies considerably depending on the source, and is often spelled Damonte, Domonte, or Damante.) shot and killed Angelo. (Note: Rick Porrello says that Angelina was 18 years old. That seems unlikely, since Fannie would have given birth at the age of 11. A contemporary news report in the Dayton Herald gave Angelina's age as 15.) (Note: In 1927, Fannie claimed she was only 28 years old.) Fannie claimed that she married Lonardo only after he threatened to kill her if she did not. Their relationship apparently did not last; by the fall of 1927, Fannie was living in St. Louis, Missouri.

Constantina Bullone (also known as Concettina Bulone) was Lonardo's mistress. Lonardo met her while in Sicily in 1926 (Note: Porrello dates her entry to the United States to the fall of 1927. This, however, does not jibe with other sources, which agree that she spent about a year in the United States before her deportation.) and began an affair with the married woman. (Note: Her husband had emigrated to New York City a short time before Lonardo arrived in Sicily. He was murdered after Lonardo returned to the United States. Crime historian Rick Porrello believes that Lonardo was responsible, although the murder caused Constantina to leave Lonardo.) He convinced her to come to the United States with him, and she agreed. She lived in Cleveland in a lavishly furnished apartment Lonardo rented on her behalf. She was 24 years old in November 1927 when U.S. officials deported her back to Italy.

=== Wealth ===
Lonardo deeded most of his property to his heirs several months before his death. (Note: The value of this property was never ascertained.) The worth of the remainder of Lonardo's estate was assessed at about $2 million ($37,100,000 in 2025 dollars) by the probate court. Concetta Lonardo was named administrator of the estate, and Lonardo's will distributed most of his remaining wealth and property to her and his five children.

Fannie Lanzone Lonardo sued to overturn the will, claiming that her 1925 civil marriage to Lonardo legally superseded Lonardo's common-law marriage to Concetta. The lawsuit tied up much of the estate, leaving Concetta Lonardo somewhat impoverished. By June 1929, her car had been legally repossessed, and her personal finances were so tight that she had to appeal to Salvatore Todaro for monetary assistance. By March 1930, the probate court had resolved the lawsuit in Concetta Lonardo's favor, although Fannie Lonardo appealed the court's decision. Joseph Metzel was appointed a guardian of the estate while the appeal was heard, and former Cleveland police detective Phil Mooney was appointed a guardian for Lonardo's minor-aged children. The value of the estate dwindled to just $149,000 ($2,900,000 in 2025 dollars) by spring 1930, largely due to legal fees incurred by Concetta Lonardo as she defended herself against murder charges in the death of Salvatore Todaro and by Angelo Lonardo as he fought a concealed weapons charge. Fannie Lonardo's suit was finally dismissed by the United States Court of Appeals for the Sixth Circuit in 1932.

== Bibliography ==
- Anderson, Raymond G. (2003). "Beer". Alcohol and Temperance in Modern History: An International Encyclopedia. Volume 1. Santa Barbara, Calif.: ABC-CLIO. ISBN 9781576078334.
- Basalla, Leslie; Chakerian, Peter (2015). Cleveland Beer: History and Revival in the Rust Belt. Charleston, N.C.: American Palate. ISBN 9781467117791.
- Byers, Stephen R. (2003). "Home Brewing". Alcohol and Temperance in Modern History: An International Encyclopedia. Volume 1. Santa Barbara, Calif.: ABC-CLIO. ISBN 9781576078334.
- Capeci, Jerry (2004). The Complete Idiot's Guide to the Mafia. Indianapolis: Alpha Books. ISBN 9781592573059.
- Cockayne, James (2016). Hidden Power: The Strategic Logic of Organized Crime. New York: Oxford University Press. ISBN 9780190627331.
- Critchley, David (2009). The Origin of Organized Crime in America: The New York City Mafia, 1891–1931. New York: Routledge. ISBN 9780415990301.
- Funderberg, J. Anne (2014). Bootleggers and Beer Barons of the Prohibition Era. Jefferson, N.C.: McFarland & Company. ISBN 9780786479610.
- Gentile, Nick; Chilanti, Felice (1963). Vita di Capomafia [Life of Capomafia] (in Italian). Rome: Riuniti. ISBN 9788886134149.
- Griffin, Joe; DeNevi, Don (2002). Mob Nemesis: How the FBI Crippled Organized Crime. Amherst, N.Y.: Prometheus Books. ISBN 9781573929196.
- Guarnera, Rosemary Valenti (2014). Me and the General. Bloomington, Ind.: Xlibris Corp. ISBN 9781493158324.
- Hart, F. Leslie; Fisher, Harry Johnstone (1971). Modern Food Analysis. Berlin: Springer-Verlag. ISBN 9783540051268.
- Hess, Henner (1998). Mafia and Mafiosi: Origin, Power and Myth. London: Hurst. ISBN 9781863331432.
- Hunt, Thomas; Tona, Michael A. (2013). DiCarlo: Buffalo's First Family of Crime. Vol. 1. Buffalo, N.Y.: Hunt and Tona Publications. ISBN 9781304265814.
- Kerr, Kathel Austin (1973). The Politics of Moral Behavior. Reading, Mass.: Addison-Wesley.
- Mappen, Mark (2013). Prohibition Gangsters: The Rise and Fall of a Bad Generation. New Brunswick, N.J.: Rutgers University Press. ISBN 9780813561158.
- McCarthy, Dennis M.P. (2011). An Economic History of Organized Crime: A National and Transnational Approach. New York: Routledge. ISBN 9780415487962.
- McGirr, Lisa (2016). The War on Alcohol: Prohibition and the Rise of the American State. New York: W.W. Norton & Company. ISBN 9780393353525.
- Messick, Hank (1967). The Silent Syndicate. New York: Macmillan. OCLC 29375530.
- Messick, Hank (1969). Syndicate Abroad. New York: Macmillan. OCLC 22582.
- Messick, Hank; Goldblatt, Burt (1972). The Mobs and the Mafia: The Illustrated History of Organized Crime. New York: Ballantine. ISBN 9780600361541.
- Mitchell, Sandy (2008). Cleveland's Little Italy. Charleston, S.C.: Arcadia Publishing. ISBN 9780738552132.
- Neff, James (1989). Mobbed Up: Jackie Presser's High-Wire Life in the Teamsters, the Mafia, and the F.B.I. New York: Atlantic Monthly Press. ISBN 9780871133441.
- Newton, Michael (2012). The Mafia at Apalachin, 1957. Jefferson, N.C.: McFarland & Co. ISBN 9780786466405.
- Permanent Subcommittee on Investigations (1988). 25 Years After Valachi. Committee on Government Operations. United States Senate. 100th Cong., 2d sess. S. HRG.; 100-906. Washington, D.C.: U.S. Government Printing Office. hdl:2027/mdp.39015028778994.
- Porrello, Rick (1995). The Rise and Fall of the Cleveland Mafia: Corn, Sugar, and Blood. New York: Barricade Books. ISBN 9781569800584.
- Roth, Mitchel P. (2017). Global Organized Crime: A 21st Century Approach. London: Routledge. ISBN 9781138639485.
- Slavicek, Louise Chipley (2008). The Prohibition Era: Temperance in the United States. New York: Chelsea House. ISBN 9781604130058.
- Varese, Federico (2011). Mafias on the Move: How Organized Crime Conquers New Territories. Princeton, N.J.: Princeton University Press. ISBN 9780691158013.
