= Salvatore Todaro (mobster) =

Italian-American mobster (1885–1929)

- Police mugshot of Todaro
- Born: Agosto Arcangelo (Note: His first name is spelled several ways in sources, including Agusto, Augusta, and Augusto. His last name is found in sources as Arcangelo and Archangelo.); January 26, 1885; Licata, Sicily, Kingdom of Italy
- Died: June 11, 1929 (aged 44); Cleveland, Ohio, U.S.
- Cause of death: Gun shots
- Other names: "Black Sam" "Sam Todaro"
- Citizenship: American
- Occupations: Sugar merchant, crime boss
- Predecessor: Joseph Lonardo
- Successor: Joseph Porrello
- Spouse: Carmella Todaro
- Children: 3
- Allegiance: Cleveland crime family

Salvatore Todaro (Italian pronunciation: [salvaˈtoːre ˈtɔdaːro]; born Agosto Arcangelo; [aˈɡosto arˈkandʒelo]; January 26, 1885 – June 11, 1929), also known as "Black Sam" and "Sam Todaro", was an American mobster who became the second boss of the Cleveland crime family. A friend and criminal associate of rising organized crime figure Joseph Lonardo, he rose swiftly in the Mayfield Road Mob and became manager of Lonardo's legitimate corn sugar and criminal corn whiskey operations. He was a well-recognized figure in organized crime circles, and became briefly involved with the Buffalo crime family.

After Lonardo organized the Cleveland crime family, Todaro became underboss. Lonardo briefly considered having him assassinated, but relented after pressure from other mafioso. Frustrated with the minimal profits he made as underboss, Todaro allied with Lonardo's emerging competitor, Joseph Porrello, in 1927. Todaro likely arranged for Lonardo's assassination on October 13, 1927.

U.S. federal law enforcement officials believe Todaro became the second boss of the Cleveland family, although there is evidence that he shared power with the Porrello family. He quickly became wealthy, even as revenues from corn sugar and corn whiskey declined due to changing consumer tastes. When word spread in early 1929 of his involvement with Joseph Lonardo's death, Todaro began to fear for his life. He was murdered by Joseph's son, Angelo Lonardo, in a daylight assassination at a Porrello-owned barber shop on June 11, 1929.

== Early life ==
Todaro was born Agosto Arcangelo on January 26, 1885, in Licata, Sicily, to Joseph and Marie (née Malfatona) Arcangelo. He was raised in Licata, and was a childhood friend of Joseph Lonardo. The local economy was dominated by sulfur mining. The mine owners were extremely wealthy, while nearly all the other people in Licata were extremely poor. Organized crime had been deeply embedded in both Sicilian and Licatan culture for centuries, with the Black Hand and Onorata Societa operating in the town.

Arcangelo family friend Joseph Lonardo emigrated from Italy to the United States in February 1901, followed by Todaro shortly thereafter, entering the country on April 15, 1901, and arriving in Cleveland, Ohio, the next day. His first job was as a night watchman on The Flats. Todaro was not alone in the United States. His cousin, Joseph "Busy Joe" Patitucci, was a close friend and heroin and opium dealer who had been living in Buffalo, New York, since about 1900. Patitucci's mother, Natalia, was Todaro's aunt.

Lonardo moved to Cleveland in 1905, at first engaging in legitimate businesses like selling fruit and operating a confectionery. He also began a criminal career soon after arriving in Cleveland, engaging in extortion and robbery. Many members of the Porrello family also emigrated to the U.S. in 1905 and settled in Cleveland. Joseph Lonardo and his three brothers were well-acquainted with the seven Porrello sons, having worked alongside them in the Porrello sulfur mine near Licata. The Porrellos, too, were lifelong friends with Todaro.

== Criminal career with the Lonardos ==
About 1913, a somewhat loosely organized Italian American gang known as the Mayfield Road Mob formed in Cleveland's Little Italy neighborhood. The protection racket was the core business of the Mayfield Road Mob at first. Once Prohibition began, Joseph Lonardo and his brothers began taking over the Mayfield Road Mob and organizing it, turning it into the dominant criminal organization in Cleveland.

In the early 1920s, Joseph Lonardo, his brothers Frank and John, and Todaro were working in the Lonardo confectionery business. Joseph Porrello also found work there.

=== Lonardo's involvement in Prohibition ===
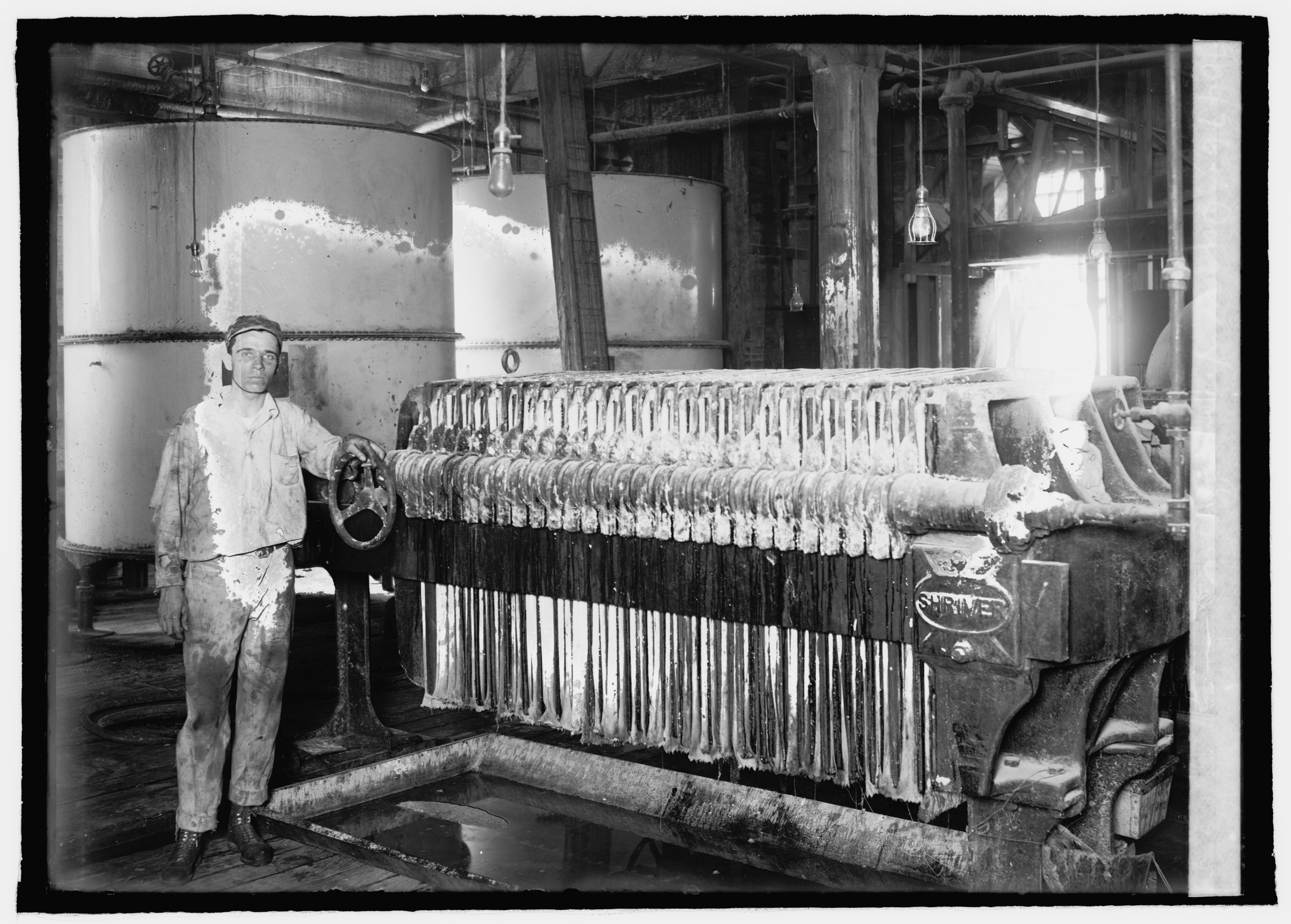
The manufacture of sugar from corn

Prohibition began in Ohio on May 27, 1919, and nationally throughout the United States on January 16, 1920. Todaro quickly got involved in the transportation of illegal liquor.

By 1924, the Mayfield Road Mob was moving to secure a monopoly on both the importation and manufacture of illegal liquor in northeast Ohio. (Note: Although the smuggling of liquor into the country also occurred, it became more important than home distillation only after 1923.) This group consisted primarily of the Lonardo brothers, Todaro, John Angersola, (Note: Gentile refers to "Gianni King" in his book. "John King" was an alias of John Angersola.) Charles Colletti, Lawrence Lupo, and Charles Russo. In 1925, with pre-Prohibition stockpiles of alcohol exhausted, corn whiskey, which had been manufactured on a small scale—became the illegal liquor of choice in northeast Ohio. Corn sugar (Note: Corn sugar is created by treating corn starch slurry with hydrochloric acid and then heating the mixture under pressure for several minutes. When filtered, clarified, concentrated, and seeded with a few dextrose crystals, the mixture can be poured into shallow pans where it will crystallize. It is generally sold in slabs, as pellets, or in chips.) was the key to the manufacture of corn whiskey. It could not only be substituted for grain as the main ingredient in mash but also permitted faster production of the final liquor. Control of the corn sugar industry as well as the distribution of illegal liquor was critical to anyone seeking to dominate the illegal liquor industry.

Lonardo essentially established a cottage industry in the production of illegal corn whiskey. He and his brothers used their profits from previous criminal activities to invest heavily in corn sugar manufacturing, a completely legal enterprise, and purchased a warehouse at Woodland Avenue and E. 9th Street.

=== Todaro oversight of the Lonardo corn sugar business ===
Todaro entered the Lonardo corn sugar business as a truck driver in 1923. He was swiftly promoted to salesman and then manager of the warehouse. He also oversaw the Lonardo corn sugar business' bookkeeping, assisted home brewers working for the Lonardos in obtaining and setting up stills, and managed Joseph Lonardo's personal finances. Lonardo considered him the Mayfield Road Mob's underboss.

Beginning in 1924, Lonardo began a campaign of intimidation and murder to win control of the majority of bootlegging in northeast Ohio. The barriers to entry into the illegal liquor industry were low, which meant that Lonardo could reduce, but not eliminate, the competition. Lonardo relied on several associates in his effort, including Todaro; Frank Milano, another top leader in the Mayfield Road Mob; and Mayfield Road Mob members Angersola, Colletti, Lupo, and Russo. The Porrello brothers were the only significant corn sugar suppliers other than Lonardo, who eliminated nearly all other competitors. Lonardo tolerated the Porrello operation only because they were lifelong friends. Todaro and the Porrello brothers provided the critical support that enabled Lonardo to become boss of the Cleveland mafia.

Todaro became a naturalized citizen on January 23, 1925. Shortly thereafter, Todaro secured the release of his friend, Carmelo Licarti, (Note: His last name was also spelled Licati, and he also used the last names D'Antona and Dottore.) from prison and employed him in the Lonardo sugar warehouse. Licarti had killed Cleveland police patrolman Elmer Glaefke on September 12, 1917, after Glaefke and another patrolman tried to stop Licarti and two other men for questioning. He was convicted of second-degree murder in 1918 and—surprisingly, according to the local news media—sentenced to life in prison rather than death in the electric chair. Todaro secured Licarti's release from prison by inducing federal law enforcement officials to demand his deportation. Ohio Governor A. Victor Donahey shocked the press and public by commuting Licarti's sentence. Although federal records indicated that Licarti sailed for Italy on April 4, 1925, he in fact returned to Cleveland where he lived on the west side. (Note: With Todaro's assistance, Licarti resumed his career in organized crime and became quite powerful. On April 4, 1930, police found Licarti bound, gagged, and shot dead at 11200 Gay Avenue. Police suspected that he was killed by Anthony and Anthony Borsellino, two cousins in the employ of Pittsburgh bootleggers. Police believed that the Lonardo family, by 1930 decimated by its gang war with the Porrellos, had hired the Borsellinos to kill Licarti.)

=== Involvement with the Buffalo crime family ===
About 1919, Patitucci introduced Todaro to leading Buffalo crime family figure Joseph DiCarlo. Todaro probably met low-ranking Buffalo mobster Gaetano Capodicaso about the same time.

Patitucci had by 1923 become an influential member of the Buffalo crime family by virtue of his narcotics dealing. His drug dealing organization had deeply compromised the Buffalo police department with bribes. Patitucci was convicted of selling illegal narcotics in July 1923. Facing a two-year prison term in the federal penitentiary in Atlanta, Georgia, he decided to turn state's evidence and testify about police corruption and drug dealing in Buffalo. The start of his prison term was delayed while he assisted prosecutors. Undoubtedly realizing the danger this posed, Todaro asked Patitucci to relocate to Cleveland. Patitucci declined.

Patitucci accused DiCarlo of leading Buffalo's largest narcotics gang, and testified against him in December 1923. DiCarlo and fellow gang member Peter Gallelo attempted to murder Patitucci on January 1, 1924, as he walked on the street. (Note: Patitucci had been out on bail since late July 1923. The automobile in which DiCarlo and Gallelo were riding was driven by another Buffalo organized crime member, Joseph Ruffino, while a fourth mobster, Gaetano Capodicaso, rode in the car.) In a report that was later retracted, the local news media claimed that a vast criminal conspiracy was attempting to silence witnesses in the Patitucci shooting. DiCarlo, Gallelo, and two others were charged on February 4 with witness intimidation and the attempted kidnapping of a witness with force of arms.

Patitucci provided further testimony against DiCarlo on February 5. Sylvester Camerano (a.k.a. Lester Cameron) was called as a defense witness, impugning Patitucci's character. Patitucci's wife, May, directly contradicted her husband's testimony on the stand. (Note: May Patitucci had previously supported his testimony in statements to a grand jury and to police. She was subsequently arraigned on charges of perjury due to her witness-stand statements.) DiCarlo and Gallelo were found guilty of witness intimidation and sentenced to six year in federal prison.

Todaro became involved in the case when Patitucci sent him a telegram on March 1, asking him to come to Buffalo as soon as possible. Patitucci then attempted to shoot his own wife on March 10, and a few minutes later committed suicide by swallowing bichloride of mercury. On his deathbed, Patitucci allegedly wrote a statement in which he retracted his court testimony accusing DiCarlo and Gallelo of shooting him. (Note: Patitucci also told Todaro that he had falsely accused a number of men in New York City of drug dealing.) Todaro visited Patitucci in a Buffalo hospital on March 31, at which time (Todaro said) Patitucci disclosed the existence of his written confession, telling Todaro it was located in a notebook at the home of Patitucci's mother. Todaro later told federal investigators that he took the notebook and returned to Cleveland. He stored it at the grocery he owned with Joseph Lonardo, and discussed its existence with Lonardo and others. When Patitucci died, Todaro turned the notebook over to Buffalo-based attorney Horace O. Lanza. Although Patitucci's signature on the written confession was verified by handwriting experts, the local district attorney refused to acknowledge it. He felt that Patitucci had signed the document as a means of saving his life. Once he served a reduced prison term, the district attorney believed, Patitucci would flee the state and make the "confession" public—freeing his enemies. State officials would find it very difficult to extradite him under those circumstances.

== Tenure as Cleveland crime boss ==
=== Lonardo's death threat ===
According to Nicola Gentile, (Note: Historian James Cockayne argues that Gentile is a highly accurate source whose reports have been tested and found trustworthy time and again.) Lonardo resolved in October or November 1926 to have Todaro killed, using Todaro's mistreatment of one of Lonardo's Jewish employees as a pretext. (Note: The mistreated individual may have been Charles "Chuck" Polizzi, the Jewish foster younger brother of Mayfield Road Mob member Alfred Polizzi. Chuck Polizzi worked the rackets regularly with Al Polizzi and Lawrence Lupo. Nicola Gentile, however, indicates that the individual was a low-ranking bootlegger, possibly someone running a still.)

Lonardo told capo Lawrence Lupo to carry out the assassination; Lupo, in turn, chose Angersola and Colletti as the killers. Joseph Biondo and Paolino Palmieri, (Note: Gentile may be referring to Angelo Palmeri, boss of the Buffalo crime family from 1908 to 1916 and consigliere from 1916 to his death in 1932.) members of the Buffalo crime family, tried to convince Lonardo to rescind his murder plans, but he refused. Gentile conferred with Palmieri, and both men agreed that Todaro's actions did not warrant death. A high-ranking organized crime messenger and mediator with powerful ties in the Sicilian mafia, Gentile feared a loss of prestige if he could not convince Lonardo to stop the hit. He asked Colletti not to make the hit until Gentile had left Cleveland. Gentile finally told Lonardo that if Todaro was murdered without good reason, Gentile would leave Cleveland and never return. This was a serious threat: Gentile and Lonardo were partners in a legitimate gourmet food import business (Note: This business, established in April 1926, imported about $36,842 worth ($700,000 in 2025 dollars) of cheeses, olive oil, and sardines. These were sold to Lonardo's friends, who competed to purchase them by offering ever-higher dollar amounts. The business made $100,000 ($1,800,000 in 2025 dollars) on its $36,842 investment.) and Gentile had established a store in Cleveland which sold tin cans and other containers needed by bootleggers. Lonardo also stored large stocks of bootleg liquor owned by Gentile, and Gentile would stand to lose a great deal of money. The seriousness of Gentile's announcement impressed Lonardo, who rescinded the assassination order the next day.

Afterward, Gentile, Biondo, Palmieri, and Mayfield Road Mob member Frank Milano (Note: Gentile refers in his text to Ciccio Milano, a "peacemaker" within the Mayfield Road Mob. Ciccio was Frank Milano's birth name.) visited Todaro. Todaro was dismissive of Gentile; in response, Biondo, Milano, and Palmieri beat Todaro and told him that he owed his life to "this saint". Todaro abjectly apologized to Gentile. The five men then visited Lonardo, who forgave Todaro for his betrayal. Later, when Todaro fell ill, Lonardo even visited him on his sickbed.

=== Defection to the Porrellos ===
In April 1927, Lonardo left for Sicily for five months to visit his mother. Lonardo left his brother, John, and Todaro in charge of the Mayfield Road Mob and the corn sugar/illegal distillery business while he was gone.

Todaro was unhappy with Lonardo's rule. Despite largely managing the Lonardo corn sugar business, he had gained little wealth. Although it is unclear who approached whom first, after Lonardo's departure Todaro and the Porrellos conspired to undermine the Lonardo illegal liquor organization. (Note: Newton says that Todaro failed to stop the Porrellos from undermining the Lonardo business. It was only after his dismissal by Lonardo that Todaro joined the Porrellos.) John Lonardo lacked good judgment, and a leadership vacuum emerged in the Mayfield Road Mob which contributed to the rise of the Porrellos. The Lonardo family's influence with local politicians and police evaporated, and law enforcement raids on home brewers loyal to the Lonardos increased significantly. A Porrello subordinate, Mike Chiapetta, began swiftly building a home brewing network loyal to the Porrellos. Just a few weeks after Lonardo's departure, the Porrellos had taken control of more than half of Lonardo's corn sugar and corn whiskey business. Todaro suddenly became wealthy.

Lonardo returned to Cleveland in August 1927. He correctly surmised that Todaro had conspired with the Porrellos to undermine his business, and was allegedly enraged that Todaro refused to acknowledge that he owed his social status to Lonardo—not the Porrellos. In retaliation, Lonardo ejected Todaro from the Mayfield Road Mob.

=== Murder of Lonardo ===
Lonardo was not eager to start a gang war. He met several times with the Porrellos to discuss what was happening, allegedly seeking a merger of the two gangs and their bootleg operations.

Todaro, however, resolved to kill Lonardo and take over organized crime in Cleveland. Lonardo met future "boss of bosses" Salvatore "Toto" D'Aquila while living in New York City from 1901 to 1905. Lonardo treated D'Aquila "like a god", and was one of his strongest supporters. D'Aquila supported Lonardo in his successful attempt to become boss of the Cleveland mafia. In New York, Giuseppe "Joe the Boss" Masseria was contending with D'Aquila for control of the city's mafia, and began backing challenges to D'Aquila's supporters in other cities. Much of Masseria's extended family lived in Cleveland and his brother was a member of the Mayfield Road Mob, so Masseria's interest in Cleveland was particularly acute. Masseria supported efforts by Todaro and the Porrello brothers to challenge Lonardo, and Masseria encouraged Todaro to murder Lonardo and become boss. Todaro likely ordered the murder of Lonardo as well as arranged the meeting at which Lonardo was killed.

Early in the evening of October 13, 1927, someone telephoned Lonardo and asked him to come to the barber shop owned by Ottavio Porrello (Joseph Porrello's brother) at 10902 Woodland Avenue. (Note: The caller was never identified, although it appears to have been someone Lonardo trusted.) Lonardo and John arrived at the barber shop without any bodyguards (which was highly unusual) about 8:15 p.m. and proceeded into the back room, which was used for playing cards. A few minutes after 8:30 p.m., two men entered the card room and shot Lonardo to death. John, severely wounded, attempted to flee but was knocked unconscious in front of 10925 Woodland and bled to death on the sidewalk.

Gentile claims he knew immediately that Todaro, assisted by the Porrellos, had ordered the murder of Lonardo. (Note: Buffalo police later claimed that Lonardo's two killers were brought to that city to kill leading mafioso Filippo Mazzara. The Buffalo crime family was dominated by the Magaddinos. The Magaddinos were led by Mazzara, who was from the Sicilian town of Castellammare del Golfo. The Magaddinos were aligned with D'Aquila and friendly to Lonardo. A rival faction was led by Vincenzo "Big Jim" and Salvatore "Sam" Callea, Licatans backed by the Porrellos. Mazzara was murdered on December 22, 1927, after which the Calleas became the dominant faction in the Buffalo organization.)

=== Becoming Cleveland crime boss ===
Lupo attempted to gain control over the Lonardo corn sugar and corn whiskey empire after Lonardo's death but was murdered on May 31, 1928. (Note: The Plain Dealer later said Lupo even claimed to be boss of the Mayfield Road Mob, although his position was tenuous and never confirmed by other mafia families.) No one was ever convicted of Lupo's killing, although police believed Colletti was one of the killers and they suspected Charles "Chuck" Polizzi (foster younger brother of Mayfield Road Mob member Alfred Polizzi) of involvement as well. Lupo may have been killed on the orders of fellow Mayfield Road mobster Anthony Milano.

Federal law enforcement officials believed that Todaro then successfully took over Lonardo's criminal enterprises, becoming the second boss of the Cleveland crime family. A local newspaper echoed this assessment, calling him "chief of the corn sugar business". Other sources disagree. Rick Porrello (Joseph Porrello's grand-nephew) claims that Joseph Porrello, not Todaro, vied to control bootleg liquor in Cleveland. Angersola, Colletti, and Chuck Polizzi, he says, were also trying to win control of the former Lonardo organization, but each soon fell in line behind Frank Milano. Joseph Porrello, he says, declared himself boss after Lupo's death. Crime authors Patricia Martinelli and Joe Griffin and Don DeNevi do not provide similar details, but do say that Porrello succeeded Lonardo as boss. Historian David Critchley said that Todaro allied with the Porrellos rather than became boss himself, and Griffin and DeNevi claim that Todaro served as the Porrello's underboss. Crime historians Thomas Hunt and Michael A. Tona conclude that Todaro and the Porrellos jointly ran the Mayfield Road Mob. However, Todaro appeared to exercise more power in the group, as it was he who guided the gang into supporting Masseria. Unlike D'Aquila, Masseria believed in admitting non-Sicilians and even non-Italians to the mafia. Todaro and the Porrellos believed the same, whereas Lonardo did not.

A major meeting of Sicilian and Italian organized crime figures was scheduled at Cleveland's Hotel Statler the first week of December 1928. Law enforcement authorities at the time hypothesized that the meeting was called to end Cleveland's "Corn Sugar War", (Note: The Lonardos and Porrellos engaged in a series of retaliatory murders after Joseph Lonardo's death. Police believed the two factions were vying for control of the corn sugar industry, which they called the "Corn Sugar War". In fact, control over corn sugar had been decided with Lonardo's death a year earlier.) or to set up Chicago gang leader Joe Aiello for murder, or to reorganize the rackets after the deaths of Arnold Rothstein and Frankie Yale, or an attempt to elect a successor to Chicago gangster Antonio Lombardo. Several sources say this meeting occurred at the instigation of Joseph Porrello, who invited the heads of the most powerful mafia families in the country to the city to confirm himself as boss of the Cleveland crime family. Although the meeting was raided by police before it could occur, Rick Porrello said Joseph Porrello would have been formally anointed boss because he had Joe Masseria's backing.

Hunt and Tona argue that the Statler Hotel meeting was called to confirm Masseria as "boss of bosses". They point out that Masseria had been the de facto boss of bosses since the death of Umberto Valenti (D'Aquila's patron) in August 1922 and D'Aquila's flight from his Brooklyn home in 1925–26. (Note: D'Aquila had long lived in Brooklyn, and it was considered his "territory" for organized crime. Leaving Brooklyn was considered a major sign of weakness and undermined his claim to be boss of bosses.) Most of Masseria's extended family lived in Cleveland, making Cleveland a likely site for a confirmation meeting. Similar meetings in the past involved hundreds of crime figures. Only 23 individuals were arrested at the Statler, indicating that most of the expected Statler attendees had not yet arrived.

=== Activities as boss ===
According to Angelo Lonardo (Joseph Lonardo's son), Todaro was widely considered the "brains" of the bootleg industry in Cleveland. He became known for talking about his business activities only with his closest associates, and even then he was not very talkative. He also began opening the Mayfield Road Mob to non-Sicilians.

Todaro became quite wealthy after Lonardo's death. He had a half-ownership in the city's million-dollar-a-year corn sugar distribution business, making $10,000 ($200,000 in 2025 dollars) a month in profits. He successfully bribed a number of local officials, including two judges and a Cuyahoga County prosecutor, to protect his illegal businesses. By June 1929, Todaro had allegedly amassed more wealth than any of the Lonardos or Porrellos—earning the nickname "king of the corn sugar barons". He associated with some of Cleveland's most famous people, once even tipping off famed restaurateur Florindo Luccioni that police were undercover in his restaurant looking for illegal liquor sales.

Todaro spent little of his money, although in 1928 he bought two cars and a new home at 2685 E. 126th Street in Cleveland. He sent large amounts of money home to his brother in Italy, where Todaro was engaged in building a luxurious mansion. (Note: Reports differ about where this structure was being built. The Plain Dealer reported in 1929 that Todaro's brother was a government official, and the white marble home was being constructed in Naples. Reporter William Miller in 1947 said, however, that Todaro's brother was a barber and the home was being built in Licata. Miller further claims that the brother was embezzling money from the funds Todaro sent him. The larger the home, the more funds were sent, which is why the brother was building one of the largest homes in Sicily. When Sam Todaro learned about his brother's scheme, he cut off the funds and ordered the home completed.)

In 1929, however, Todaro's corn sugar profits declined as the public began to choose higher-quality smuggled liquor over poor-quality home-distilled corn whiskey.

== Death and interment ==
=== Threats to safety ===
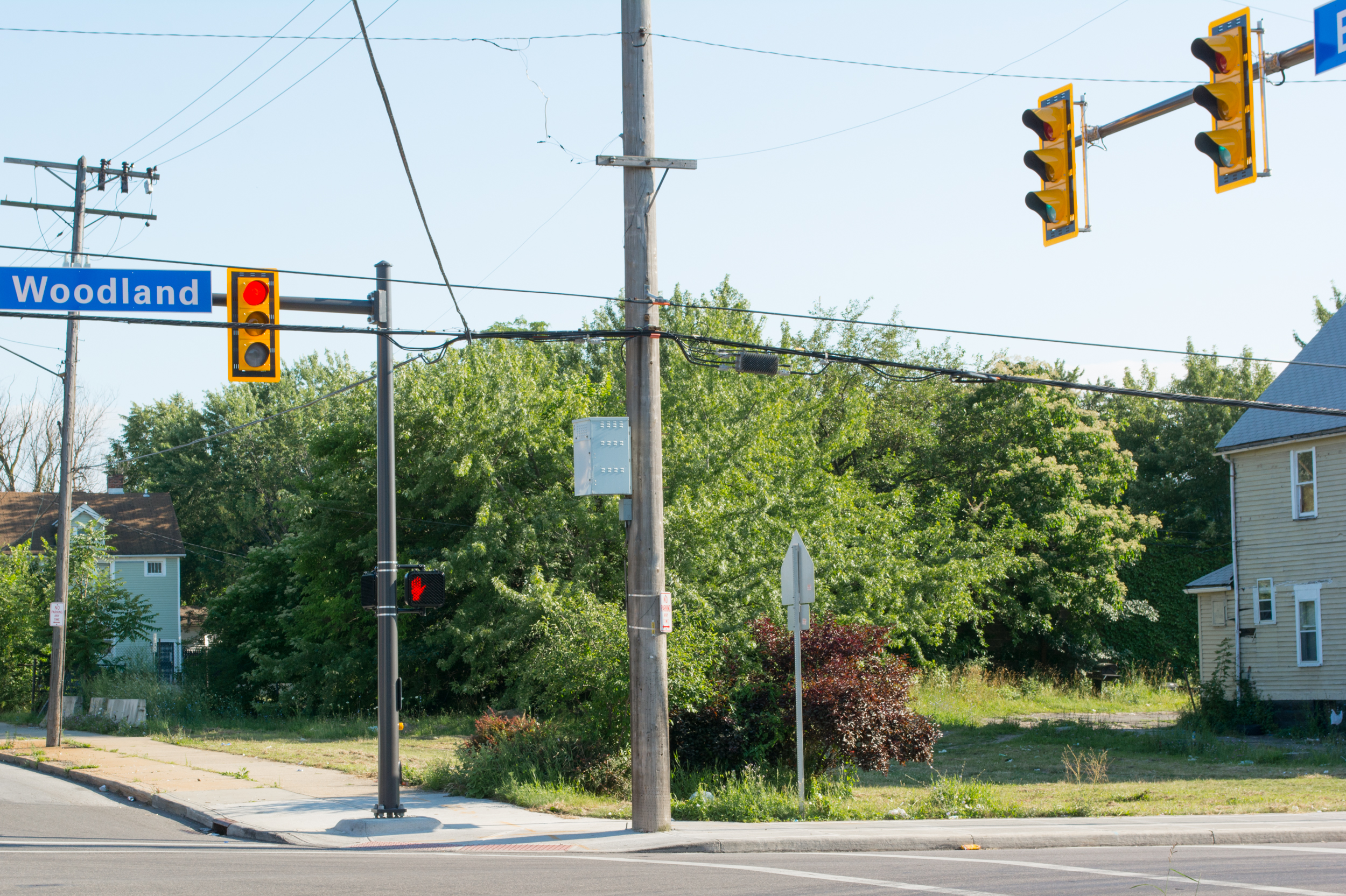
11902 Woodland Avenue (now an empty lot), site of Todaro's murder in 1929

Todaro was not suspected of ordering Lonardo's death for more than a year. (Note: Nicola Gentile claims he knew Todaro was behind Lonardo's death immediately after learning about the murder, and gave orders to have Todaro killed.) The reconciliation between Lonardo and Todaro meant that the Lonardo family still had good relations with Todaro. For example, Joseph Lonardo's widow, Concetta, found herself and her children in financial difficulty due to a probate dispute involving her late husband's will. As the widow of a boss, she was due respect and support from the crime family's new leadership, and she began visiting Todaro frequently to ask for help. Frank Lonardo also spent much time consulting Todaro, seeking business advice and as well as help in collecting debts.

By the late spring of 1929, rumors were spreading in Cleveland that Todaro had ordered Joseph Lonardo's killing. Angelo, John, and Rosario Porrello and their high-ranking capo, Salvatore "Sam" Tilocco, began fearing retribution from the Lonardos and started carrying guns. Todaro, too, began going about armed, although he left his handgun in his automobile while inside the Porrello corn sugar warehouse (where he felt safe). Whenever Todaro felt particularly threatened, he traveled to New York City to avoid being "hit". He made his last trip to New York on May 22, returning to Cleveland on June 5.

Concetta Lonardo was now close to poverty: Her car was repossessed the first week of June and her home was in danger of foreclosure. According to Rick Porrello, Todaro refused to help her any further, claiming he had collected all the debts owed her and her late husband.

=== Murder of Todaro ===
Angelo Lonardo and John DeMarco (one of Joseph Lonardo's nephews) resolved to murder Todaro for killing Joseph Lonardo, but had a difficult time gaining access to him. DeMarco thought that if Concetta Lonardo asked to see Todaro, he would not only have to reveal himself but would not be suspicious of any such meeting. That would give the two men the chance to murder him. At Angelo's urging, Concetta (unaware of the murder plot) arranged to meet Todaro at 1 p.m. on June 11, 1929, at 10902 Woodland Avenue, a barber shop owned by Ottavio Porrello. (Note: Rick Porrello incorrectly claims the murder occurred at the Porrello sugar warehouse.)

Shortly after 1 p.m., a black luxury automobile driven by Angelo Lonardo pulled up to the curb at the E. 110th Street entrance to the Porrello barber shop. Concetta Lonardo sat in front beside him, and Dominic Sospirato (another of Joseph Lonardo's nephews) was in the back seat. The group asked a man to walk around the corner onto Woodland Avenue where Todaro and his brother-in-law, Angelo Scirie, stood talking and tell Todaro that Concetta Lonardo wished to speak with him. As Concetta had spoken to him from her vehicle many times before, Todaro did not suspect foul play. He walked around the corner onto E. 110th Street and stood on the tree lawn by the Lonardo vehicle. Both men opened fire, and Todaro was shot five times. A male bystander, Patsy Lebosco, was shot in the leg. Another bullet lodged in the wall behind Todaro.

Scirie, a friend of Todaro, and a doctor (whose office was a few yards away) rushed Todaro six blocks to St. Luke's Hospital, where he died a few minutes later.

=== Burial and interment ===
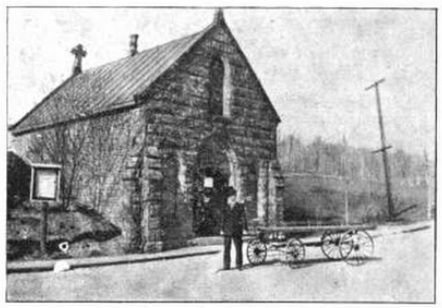
Receiving vault at Calvary Cemetery, first resting place of Salvatore Todaro

Todaro's funeral mass was held at Our Lady of Peace Catholic Church in Cleveland on June 15, 1929. There were an estimated 900 attendees, $7,500 ($100,000 in 2025 dollars) in floral tributes, (Note: Joseph Porrello sent an expensive and unique "gates of heaven ajar" floral display.) and 120 cars in the funeral procession. He was temporarily interred in a $3,900 ($100,000 in 2025 dollars) silvered casket in the receiving vault at Calvary Cemetery in Cleveland.

Todaro's wife Carmella was in Italy at the time of the murder, so she was unable to attend his funeral. She had taken her eldest son, Joseph, to Rome for medical treatment three months earlier. She had her husband's body shipped to Italy for interment, although it is unclear if he was laid to rest in Naples or in a large marble mausoleum in Licata.

Todaro's estate consisted of $2,900 ($54,375 in 2025 dollars) in savings, $150 ($2,813 in 2025 dollars) in clothes, and a 1923 automobile.

=== Aftermath ===
Joseph Porrello became the undisputed boss of the Cleveland crime family after Sam Todaro's death.

Concetta Lonardo was charged with first-degree murder in Todaro's death, but acquitted in November 1929.

Angelo Lonardo and Dominic Sospirato fled Cleveland. They later returned, were convicted of second-degree murder in Todaro's death, and sentenced to life in prison. They won a retrial from the Ohio Supreme Court, and the charges were dropped on November 25, 1931, for lack of witnesses. (Note: Lonardo and Sospirato were originally charged with first degree murder. Scirie was a key government witness in their trial, but—fearing for his life—he fled the United States for Sicily after Concetta Lonardo's trial. Without his evidence, the charges were reduced to second degree murder.)

Frank Lonardo was murdered in the card room of the Chester-18th Barber Shop at 1735 Chester Avenue on October 20, 1929, in retaliation for Todaro's death. Frank Alessi, Todaro's brother-in-law, helped the assassins identify their target.

== Personal life ==
Todaro was 5 feet 4 inches (1.63 m) tall and weighed about 145 pounds (66 kg). His swarthy complexion garnered him the nickname "Black Sam", which was conferred on him by Frank Alessi.

Todaro and his wife, Carmella (born 1894), had three children: Joseph (born August 3, 1921), Mary (born August 5, 1923), and Frank (born 1924). (Note: Antoinette Lonardo, Joseph Lonardo's daughter, was Mary's godmother.)

== Bibliography ==
- Anderson, Raymond G. (2003). "Beer". Alcohol and Temperance in Modern History: An International Encyclopedia. Volume 1. Santa Barbara, Calif.: ABC-CLIO. ISBN 9781576078334.
- Byers, Stephen R. (2003). "Home Brewing". Alcohol and Temperance in Modern History: An International Encyclopedia. Volume 1. Santa Barbara, Calif.: ABC-CLIO. ISBN 9781576078334.
- Capeci, Jerry (2004). The Complete Idiot's Guide to the Mafia. Indianapolis: Alpha Books. ISBN 9781592573059.
- Cockayne, James (2016). Hidden Power: The Strategic Logic of Organized Crime. New York: Oxford University Press. ISBN 9780190627331.
- Critchley, David (2009). The Origin of Organized Crime in America: The New York City Mafia, 1891–1931. New York: Routledge. ISBN 9780415990301.
- Funderberg, J. Anne (2014). Bootleggers and Beer Barons of the Prohibition Era. Jefferson, N.C.: McFarland & Company. ISBN 9780786479610.
- Gentile, Nick; Chilanti, Felice (1963). Vita di Capomafia. Rome: Riuniti.
- Griffin, Joe; DeNevi, Don (2002). Mob Nemesis: How the FBI Crippled Organized Crime. Amherst, N.Y.: Prometheus Books. ISBN 9781573929196.
- Hart, F. Leslie; Fisher, Harry Johnstone (1971). Modern Food Analysis. Berlin: Springer-Verlag. ISBN 9783540051268.
- Hunt, Thomas; Tona, Michael A. (2013). DiCarlo: Buffalo's First Family of Crime. Vol. 1. Buffalo, N.Y.: Hunt and Tona Publications. ISBN 9781304265814.
- Kerr, Kathel Austin (1973). The Politics of Moral Behavior. Reading, Mass.: Addison-Wesley.
- Mappen, Mark (2013). Prohibition Gangsters: The Rise and Fall of a Bad Generation. New Brunswick, N.J.: Rutgers University Press. ISBN 9780813561158.
- Martinelli, Patricia A. (2007). True Crime: Ohio. Mechanicsburg, Pa.: Stackpole Books. ISBN 9780811741736.
- McCarthy, Dennis M.P. (2011). An Economic History of Organized Crime: A National and Transnational Approach. New York: Routledge. ISBN 9780415487962.
- McGirr, Lisa (2016). The War on Alcohol: Prohibition and the Rise of the American State. New York: W.W. Norton & Company. ISBN 9780393353525.
- Messick, Hank (1967). The Silent Syndicate. New York: Macmillan.
- Messick, Hank (1969). Syndicate Abroad. New York: Macmillan.
- Messick, Hank; Goldblatt, Burt (1972). The Mobs and the Mafia: The Illustrated History of Organized Crime. New York: Ballantine Books.
- Miller, William (July 1947). "House for Adano". 1947: The Magazine of the Year. pp. 46–47.
- Neff, James (1989). Mobbed Up: Jackie Presser's High-Wire Life in the Teamsters, the Mafia, and the F.B.I. New York: Atlantic Monthly Press. ISBN 9780871133441.
- Newton, Michael (2007). Mr. Mob: The Life and Crimes of Moe Dalitz. Jefferson, N.C.: McFarland & Co. ISBN 9780786435166.
- Newton, Michael (2012). The Mafia at Apalachin, 1957. Jefferson, N.C.: McFarland. ISBN 9780786466405.
- Permanent Subcommittee on Investigations (1988). 25 Years After Valachi. Committee on Government Operations. United States Senate. 100th Cong., 2d sess. S. HRG.; 100-906. Washington, D.C.: U.S. Government Printing Office. hdl:2027/mdp.39015028778994.
- Porrello, Rick (1995). The Rise and Fall of the Cleveland Mafia: Corn, Sugar, and Blood. New York: Barricade Books. ISBN 9781569800584.
