= Charles Fischetti =

American mobster (1901–1951)

- Born: March 24, 1901; New York City, New York, U.S.
- Died: April 11, 1951 (aged 50); Miami Beach, Florida, U.S.
- Resting place: Holy Cross Cemetery, Brooklyn, New York
- Other name: "Trigger Happy"
- Occupation: Mobster
- Spouse: Ann Fischetti
- Relatives: Rocco Fischetti (brother); Al Capone (cousin)
- Allegiance: Chicago Outfit

Charles "Trigger Happy" Fischetti (March 24, 1901 – April 11, 1951) was an American mobster in the Chicago Outfit who was Al Capone's bodyguard and cousin.

== Early life ==
Charles Fischetti was born on March 24, 1901. His mother was named Mary. He had a brother, Nicholas, who was a dentist, and two other brothers, Rocco and Joseph, who were alleged criminals. He was a cousin of Al Capone.

== Career ==
Fischetti started his career as Al Capone's chauffeur in South Brooklyn. In the 1920s, he helped Capone spread his business in Cicero, Illinois. In March 1932 he and Murray Humphreys were arrested for the murder of Dennis H. Zeigler, secretary of Local 569 of the Hoisting and Portable Engineers Union. They were later released.

Fischetti attended the 1946 Havana Conference of Cosa Nostra leaders and received the murder contract on Bugsy Siegel. Fischetti was also good friends with singers Frank Sinatra and Dean Martin, the former as early as the 1940s. Upon Al Capone's death in 1947, Fischetti reportedly inherited his mob investments.

Fischetti was called a notorious Chicago gangster in the FBI files. With his brother Rocco, he surrendered April 2, 1951, to the sergeant-at-arms of the United States Senate having been sought to testify before the Senate Crime Investigating Committee (Kefauver committee). Charles Fischetti died nine days later, before he could testify.

== Personal life and death ==
Fischetti had a wife, Ann. They resided in Miami Beach, Florida.

Fischetti died of a heart attack on April 11, 1951, in Miami Beach, Florida. $30,000 worth of flowers in seven cars were sent to his funeral, which was held at Our Lady of Peace Roman Catholic Church at 561 Carroll Street in Brooklyn. It was attended by 1,500 relatives, most of them women. The Brooklyn Daily Eagle suggested they may have been the wives of organized crime associates. Meanwhile, there were also 12 policemen in uniform and 20 in plainclothes. Fischetti was buried at the Holy Cross Cemetery in Brooklyn, New York City.
