= Rocco Fischetti =

American mobster (1903–1964)

- Born: March 24, 1903; New York City, New York, U.S.
- Died: July 5, 1964 (aged 61); Massapequa, New York, U.S.
- Resting place: Pine Lawn National Cemetery, Suffolk County, New York
- Other names: "Rocky"; "Ralph Fisher"
- Occupation: Mobster
- Relatives: Charles Fischetti (brother); Al Capone (cousin)
- Allegiance: Chicago Outfit

Rocco Fischetti (March 24, 1903 – July 5, 1964), also known as "Rocky" and "Ralph Fisher", was an American mobster with the Chicago Outfit criminal organization who ran many illegal gambling operations. Fischetti was the brother of Charles Fischetti and a cousin of Al Capone. He also accompanied singer Frank Sinatra on two trips to Havana, Cuba.

== Early life ==
Rocco Fischetti was born on March 24, 1903. He was a cousin of Al Capone.

== Career ==
In the 1920s, the New York-raised Fischetti and his two brothers, Charles Fischetti and Joseph Fischetti moved to Chicago to join their first cousin Al Capone in the Outfit. During this period, the Fischetti brothers alternated between driving for Capone, acting as his bodyguards, and distilling bootleg alcohol. After Prohibition ended, Rocco Fischetti started running illegal gambling operations for the Outfit. In 1932, Rocco was acting as a bodyguard for John Capone, Al's brother, when the two men were arrested on the streets of Chicago for a minor offense.

Rocco Fischetti was soon operating some of the largest illegal gambling establishments in Lake County, Illinois and Cook County, Illinois. In Cicero, Illinois, a Chicago suburb controlled by the Outfit, Rocco Fischetti operated the notorious Rock Garden Club. In 1943, a grand jury investigation of gambling in Cicero prompted Rocco to move his establishment to the Vernon Country Club in Lake County, Illinois, one of the most elaborate establishments in that area. In later years, following investigations in Lake County, Rocco moved his gambling operation into Chicago.

During this time period, Rocco and his brothers became friends with Sinatra. In 1946, Rocco, Charles Fischetti, and Outfit boss Tony Accardo attended the Havana Conference, a convocation of mobsters from all over North America. Sinatra accompanied the Chicago men on the flight to Havana. The official cover story for the Havana Conference was that the mobsters were attending a gala party with Sinatra as the entertainer. Charles and Rocco delivered a suitcase containing $2 million to Charles "Lucky" Luciano, the founder of the national Mafia Commission who was not allowed inside the United States. The money was Luciano's share of the American rackets he still controlled. In February 1947, according to the Federal Bureau of Investigation (FBI), Rocco and Joseph Fischetti traveled again to Havana with Sinatra. During this visit, the three men again met with Luciano. In 1947, Rocco attended the funeral of Al Capone in Chicago.

Fischetti was indicted alongside August D. Liebe for illegal gambling at their Vernon Country Club in 1948.

In 1957, with Accardo's retirement as day-to-day boss and Outfit frontman, Sam Giancana became boss of the Outfit. He had Rocco once again running the gambling operations in Cicero.

== Personal life and death ==
Fischetti was divorced. He died of a heart attack on July 5, 1964, while visiting a friend in Massapequa, New York. He was 61 years old. He was buried at the Pine Lawn National Cemetery in Suffolk County, New York.
