= Louis Rothkopf =

American businessman and criminal

- Born: October 11, 1902; Cleveland, Ohio, US
- Died: July 17, 1956 (aged 53); Bainbridge, Ohio, US
- Resting place: Glenville Cemetery, Cleveland
- Other names: Lou Rhody, Lou Rody, John Zarumba, Uncle Louie
- Occupation: Businessman
- Spouse: Blanche Morgan (m. 1929; died 1955)

Louis Rothkopf, also known as Louis Rhody, Lou Rody or John Zarumba (October 11, 1902 – July 17, 1956), was an American businessman and career criminal. He was a bootlegger in Cleveland, Ohio, during Prohibition in the 1920s and 1930s. He was an investor in casinos in Las Vegas, and racetracks in Ohio and Kentucky in the 1940s and 1950s.

== Early life ==
Rothkopf was born on October 11, 1902, in Cleveland, Ohio. He attended three years of high school, and married Blanche Morgan in 1929. The couple had no children. He was known as "Uncle Louie" among showgirls.

== Career ==
As a bootlegger, Rothkopf traveled widely, and supervised alcohol production for the "Cleveland Four," also known as the Cleveland Syndicate. Rothkopf is credited with the "erection and operation of the largest illegal distilleries ever found in the United States."

He maintained a suite in Cleveland's Hollenden Hotel with his associates. In the early 1930s, Rothkopf was a partner in the Prospect Advertising Co., a front for a gambling operation.

Rothkopf was described as a Cleveland-based "racketeer" in the press by 1931, when he was sought by the police as a possible witness in the murder of a Cleveland councilor, William E. Potter.

Rothkopf and Max Diamond were convicted of tax evasion over liquor sales and sentenced to four years imprisonment and fined $5,000 in 1937. The trial showed they had failed to pay taxes on US$150,000 sales of illegal alcohol.

Rothkopf operated the Pettibone Club (originally the Arrow Club), a gambling club near Solon, Ohio, in Bainbridge Township, and was connected to the Jungle Inn, located near Youngstown, Ohio.

Rothkopf was an investor in the Desert Inn Casino, a casino in Las Vegas. He was also an investor in gambling businesses in Kentucky and Ohio. In 1936, alongside Moe Dalitz, Morris Kleinman and Sam Tucker, Rothkopf invested in the River Downs and Thistledown racetracks in Ohio.

With Morris Kleinman, Rothkopf was asked to testify before the Senate Crime Investigation Committee chaired by Tennessee Senator Estes Kefauver on bootlegging allegations in 1952. When both men refused because they didn't want the media to attend their hearing, they were first charged with contempt of Congress and later cleared.

== Personal life and death ==
Rothkopf and his wife Blanche resided in a 37-acre estate located in Bainbridge Center (formerly home to the Maple Leaf Country Club, or Maple Club, a gambling establishment closed in 1927). Mrs. Rothkopf shot herself on June 6, 1955. A year later, on July 17, 1956, Rothkopf was found dead in his car on their estate.

His brother was Benjamin Rothkopf. His nephew, Bernard Rothkopf, worked for him in Cleveland and at the Desert Inn in Las Vegas.

By the time of his death, his estate was worth $225,000 (equivalent to $2,664,474 in 2025). He bequeathed $5,000 to five philanthropic organizations, for a total of $25,000.
