= List of identities in The Gangs of New York (book) =

This is a list of identities referenced in Herbert Asbury's 1928 book The Gangs of New York including underworld figures, gang members, crime fighters and others of the Old New York era from the mid- to late 19th and early 20th century. Some were also portrayed in Martin Scorsese's 2002 film Gangs of New York.

== Gang members ==
=== Batavia Street Gang ===
Name	Portrait	Life	Comments
Duck Reardon		fl. 1895	Gang leader and "dandy" whose involvement in the theft of Herman Segal's jewelry store resulted in the arrests of himself and several members of the gang.
Mike Walsh		fl. 1895	He and Duck Reardon led several members in the robbery of Herman Segal's jewelry store, supposedly to raise money for members to attend a fancy dress ball at New Irving Hall, and was arrested days later with Reardon and other participants of the robbery.

=== Baxter Street Dudes ===
Name	Portrait	Life	Comments
Baby-Faced Willie		fl. 1870	Founder and leader of the gang during the 1870s.

=== Bowe Brothers ===
Name	Portrait	Life	Comments
Bill Bowe			Member of the Bowe crime family led by his brother Martin Bowe.
Jack Bowe			Member of the Bowe crime family led by his brother Martin Bowe.
James Bowe			Member of the Bowe crime family led by his brother Martin Bowe.
Martin Bowe			Saloon keeper and head of the criminal family which operated out of his Catherine Slip saloon known as the Glass House.
Jack Madill			Bartender and criminal associate. He was sentenced to life imprisonment for murdering his wife after she refused to help him rob a drunken sailor.

=== Bowery Boys ===
Name	Portrait	Life	Comments
Chuck Connors		1852–1913	Political organizer for Tammany Hall and founder of the Chuck Conners Association. One of the more colorful political figures in his day, he was also the longtime ward boss of Chinatown up until the turn of the 20th century.
Mose the Fireboy		d. 1849?	Pseudonym of the supposed leader of the Bowery Boys during the 1840s who was well known for battling members of the Dead Rabbits and other gangs. He was later the subject of a play written by Chanfrau entitled Mose, the Bowery B'hoy and performed at the old Olympic Theater in 1849.
Charley Lozier			Associate of the Bowery Boys and brother-in-law of Bill Poole.
William Poole		1821–1855	Popular sportsman known as "Bill The Butcher", he was one of the most recognized members of the Bowery Boys during the 1840s and 50s. His murder at the hands of Lew Baker resulted in one of the most publicized trials in the city's history.
William Varley, a.k.a. Reddy The Blacksmith		1835-1876	One of the few career criminals of the street gang, he was one of the city's most notorious underworld figures during the mid-to late 19th century.
Syksey			Lieutenant and longtime companion of Mose the Fireboy. He is supposed to have coined the phrase "hold de butt" which refers to a "dead cigar".
Tom McCann			Politician and pugilist who was said to have fought heavyweight champion John Morrissey for the right to court Duane Street madam Kate Ridgely.

=== Car Barn Gang ===
Name	Portrait	Life	Comments
Bill Lingley		d. 1913	Founder and co-leader of the Car Barn Gang with Freddie Muchfeldt. The two were eventually convicted and executed for murder in 1911.
Francis Muchfeldt		d. 1914	Co-leader of the Car Barn Gang known as "The Kid". He and "Big Bill" Lingley were convicted of murder and executed in 1911.

=== Charlton Street Gang ===
Name	Portrait	Life	Comments
Sadie the Goat		fl. 1869	Former Fourth Ward street mugger and one-time leader of the Charlton Street Gang. During the summer of 1869, she led the group of river pirates to pillage up and down the Hudson River.

=== Corcoran's Roosters ===
Name	Portrait	Life	Comments
Tommy Corcoran		fl. 1900	Supposed leader of the criminal organization based in "Corcoran's Roost" founded by his father Jimmy Corcoran.

=== Daybreak Boys ===
Name	Portrait	Life	Comments
William Howlett		1834–1853	He and Nicholas Saul were the co-leaders of the Daybreak Boys during the early 1850s. They were both hanged for murder when they shot and killed a watchman while robbing the brig William Watson.
Nicholas Saul		1833–1853	Co-leader of the Daybreak Boys with William Howlett. He and Howlett were convicted and hanged for murder after killing the watchman during the robbery of the brig William Watson.
Bill Johnson		fl. 1850	A close associate, but reportedly ineffectual, member of the Daybreak Boys. A participant in the robbery of the brig William Watson with William Howlett and Nicholas Saul, he was so drunk that "he was unable to lend a hand at the oars" and was later arrested with them after a gunfight with police at their Slaughter House Point headquarters. Of the three, Johnson was sentenced to life imprisonment and the others to be hanged.
Sow Madden		fl. 1850	Member of the Daybreak Boys during the 1850s.
Sam McCarthy		fl. 1850	Known as "Cow Legged Sam", he was the last leader of the Daybreak Boys before its breakup by Police Chief George Washington Matsell. He eventually abandoned the Daybreak Boys to join a burglary gang operating in the Five Points.
Bill Lowrie		fl. 1850	Took over the leadership of the Daybreak Boys with Slobbery Jim after Howlett and Saul were hanged. After Slobbery Jim left New York for the murder of Patsy The Barber, he and the gang operated out of his bar, The Rising States, with his girlfriend Molly Maher until his arrest for in a dock robbery and sentenced to 15 years imprisonment.
Slobbery Jim		1839-?	He and Bill Lowrie succeeded Howlett and Saul as leaders of the Daybreak Boys. Slobbery Jim was later forced to flee the city after murdering fellow member Patsy the Barber.
Patsy The Barber		d. 1859	Member of the Daybreak Boys during the 1850s. His murder by Slobbery Jim forced the gang leader to flee the city.
Molly Maher		fl. 1850	Criminal associate of the Daybreak Boys and girlfriend of Bill Lowrie and later Sam McCarthy.
Pete Williams		fl. 1850	Dive keeper whose Slaughter House Point dive bar and gin mill was used as a headquarters for the Daybreak Boys.

=== Dead Rabbits ===
Name	Portrait	Life	Comments
Kit Burns		1831–1870	Saloon keeper and owner of the Water Street resort Sportsman's Hall, he and Tommy Hadden served as lieutenants and later became leaders of the Dead Rabbits during the 1850s and 60s.
Tommy Hadden			Saloon keeper and owner of a Water Street crimp house, located next to Dan Kerrigan's place, and co-led the Dead Rabbits with Kit Burns.
John Morrissey		1831–1878	One-time pugilist, sportsman and gambler, Morrissey was one of the most visible figures among Tammany Hall supporters who fought against the Know Nothing party during the 1840s and 50s.
Hell-Cat Maggie		fl. 1840	One of the most prominent female fighters allied with the Dead Rabbits during the early 1840s, she was said to have filed her teeth into points and wore long nails of brass while battling rival gangs from the Bowery.
Jack The Rat			Bowery character and son-in-law of Dead Rabbits leader Kit Burns who took bets at Sportsman Hall to bite the head off of a mouse for ten cents and decapitate a rat for a quarter.

=== Dutch Mob ===
Name	Portrait	Life	Comments
Mike Kurtz		1845–1904	Leader of the Dutch Mob known as "Sheeny Mike". He and the others were run out of their home territory, located between Houston and Fifth Street, by a "flying squad" under police captain Anthony Allaire in 1877.
Little Freddie		fl. 1870	One of the co-founders of the Dutch Mob. He and other gang members were run out of the district by the NYPD in 1877.
Johnny Irving		d. 1883	The third co-founder of the Dutch Mob and brother of Babe Irving. Johnny Irving was shot and killed by rival gang member Johnny the Mick in Shang Draper's saloon in 1883.
Billy Porter		1850–?	A longtime member of the Dutch Mob, he was present during the gunfight at Shang Draper's saloon between Johnny Irving and Johnny the Mick. After killing Johnny the Mick, he himself was immediately gunned down by Shang Draper.
Gilbert Yost		d. 1886	A regular criminal associate, he was a well-known burglar and member of the George Leonidas Leslie gang.

=== Eastman Gang ===
Name	Portrait	Life	Comments
Monk Eastman		1880–1920	One of the last great gang chieftains who founded the Eastman Gang and feuded with Paul Kelly and the Five Points Gang over control of New York's underworld at the turn of the 20th century.
Jack Zelig		1882–1912	A longtime member of the Eastmans, "Big Jack" Zelig took over the gang following the death of Kid Twist and was perhaps its last powerful leader prior to his murder by Red Phil Davidson in 1912. His murder, although never proven, was thought to have been motivated by his testimony as a star witness in the Charles Becker murder trial.
Red Phil Davidson		1882–?	A criminal associate of the Five Points Gang supposedly involved with its leader Jack Sirocco to murder Jack Zelig the day before his testimony in the Becker-Rosenthal murder trial.
Tommy Dyke			Associate of Chick Tricker and manager of his Bowery dive bar. He was also a political organizer and head of the Lenny & Dyke Association.
Richie Fitzpatrick		1880–1905	Former lieutenant to Paul Kelly who defected from the Five Points Gang to join Monk Eastman during their gang war. Killed during a struggle for leadership of the Eastmans with Kid Twist. Invented a method of execution later used in the 1972 film The Godfather.
Vach Lewis		1882–1908	Former circus strongman known as "Cyclone Louis". A close associate of Kid Twist, he was employed as his bodyguard and was later ambushed and killed alongside Kid Twist by Five Points gunman Louis Pioggi.
Charles Livin			A veteran member and longtime lieutenant to Monk Eastman known as "Ike the Blood". He was ambushed and killed by several unknown members of the Gopher Gang at a dive bar at Seventh Avenue and Twenty-Eight Street.
Chick Tricker			Saloon keeper and lieutenant of Jack Zelig who, with Jack Sirocco, later fought Jack Zelig for control of the Eastman Gang. Among his many establishments, he owned a Park Row saloon which competed against Jack McManus's New Brighton dance hall with their underworld feud eventually resulting in McManus's death.
Max Zwerbach		1884-1908	One of Paul Kelly's lieutenants known as "Kid Twist", who defected to Monk Eastman during the Eastman-Five Point gang war. He succeeded Eastman as leader of the gang after the murder of Richie Fitzpatrick, another rival for leadership, in 1905. He and Cyclone Louie were gunned down by Louis Pioggi three years later.
Kid Dahl			A close associate of Kid Twist, he is believed to have killed Richie Fitzpatrick on his orders and later took over the East Side stuss game run by The Bottler.
Jack Sirocco		1882–1954	A lieutenant under Jack Zelig, he and Chick Tricker formed a separate faction and battled Zelig over leadership of the Eastman Gang.
Chris Wallace			Young criminal associate of Monk Eastman who was arrested with Eastman for the infamous street mugging which resulted in Eastman's 10 year imprisonment in Sing Sing.
Charley Torti			A criminal associate of Jack Sirocco, he attempted to kill Jack Zelig during the gang war against the Jack Sirocco-Chick Tricker faction.
Julie Morrell		d. 1911	Criminal associate of Jack Sirocco who was killed in a failed attempt to murder Jack Zelig.
Diamond Charley			Bowery drug peddler who organized and later monopolized the selling of chloral and morphine.
Carroll Terry			Coney Island dancing girl and girlfriend of Kid Twist.

=== Five Points Gang ===
Name	Portrait	Life	Comments
Paul Kelly		1876–1936	Former pugilist and founder of the Five Points Gang, he was the longtime rival of Monk Eastman with whom he battled over control of New York's underworld at the turn of the 20th century. He ruled over the city for a brief time after Monk Eastman's downfall, but his power declined after a failed attempt on his life by Biff Ellison and Razor Riley in 1906 forced him to close the popular New Brighton Dance Hall.
Nathan Kaplan		1891–1923	A former member of the Five Pointers known as "Kid Dropper", he and Johnny Spanish formed a group of ex-Five Point gang members involved in labor racketeering. He and Spanish soon fell out however, their gang war becoming known as the second "Labor Slugger War", and controlled "labor slugging" until his murder by Louis Kushner.
James T. Ellison		1862–?	Former bouncer and criminal associate of Paul Kelly. In 1906, he and Razor Riley attempted to kill Paul Kelly at his New Brighton headquarters. Although they shot him three times, Kelly survived and Ellison was captured in 1910, imprisoned in Sing Sing, and eventually committed to an insane asylum where he died years later.
Pat Hogan			Criminal associate of Paul Kelly known as "Rough House Hogan". He was present with Kelly when Ellison and Riley attacked him and later testified against Ellison at his trial.
Jack McManus		1862-1905	Saloon keeper, pugilist and longtime bouncer known as "Eat 'Em Up" McManus. He was the "Sheriff of the New Brighton" and was killed in an underworld feud with Chick Tricker.
Louis Pioggi		1889–1969	A young Five Points gang member known as "Louie the Lump", who gunned down Eastman leader Kid Twist and his bodyguard Cyclone Louie in a dispute over Coney Island dancing girl Carroll Terry in 1908.
John McCarthy			Criminal associate of the Five Point Gang involved in prostitution and running panel houses. In 1888, he was involved in a gunfight with Whyos lead Danny Driscoll over prostitute Beezy Garrity which resulted in her death.
Bill Harrington		d. 1909	He was shot and killed in Paul Kelly's bar by "Biff Ellison", leader of the Gopher Gang.
Joe Hickman			Five Point gang member known as "Itsky Joe", known as the last leader of the gang before its breakup.
Cora the Blonde			Popular New Brighton showgirl and girlfriend of Bill Harrington, she was present with Harrington when Ellison and Riley attempted to kill Paul Kelly at the New Brighton dance hall in 1908.
Johnny Torrio		1882–1957	Leader of the affiliated-James Street Gang, the group included future organized crime figures such as Al Capone, Frankie Yale and Charles Luciano.

=== Forty Thieves ===
Name	Portrait	Life	Comments
Edward Coleman		d. 1839	Leader of the Forty Thieves. He was convicted of murdering his wife, a "hot corn girl", and was the first man to be hanged at The Tombs.
Maggie Carson		fl. 1850	Leader of the Forty Little Thieves, Carson was known as "Wild Maggie".

=== Gas House Gang ===
Name	Portrait	Life	Comments
Tom Lynch		d. 1912	Last leader of the Gas House Gang. Killed by rival Jimmy Cariggio in 1912.
William Jones		fl. 1911	Also known as "Scotty Jones", he was one of many underworld figures to be arrested during the NYPD's campaign against the city's street gangs being convicted of the murder of two fellow gang members in 1911.

=== Gopher Gang ===
Name	Portrait	Life	Comments
Marty Brennan			A high-ranking leader of the Gophers, he and Newburgh Gallagher were among those convicted during the NYPD's campaign against the city's street gangs and eventually sent to Sing Sing.
One Lung Curran		d. 1917	An early member and later leader of the Gophers. He was well known in Hell's Kitchen for attacking policemen and stealing their uniforms, later becoming a popular trend in the underworld.
Edward Egan			A lieutenant under Owney Madden, he disappeared shortly after Madden's conviction for the murder of Patsy Doyle.
Razor Riley			A well-known member of the Gophers who, with Biff Ellison, attempted to murder Paul Kelly and take over the Five Points Gang. Kelly survived the attempt however and Riley eventually died from pneumonia while hiding out in Chinatown.
Newburg Gallagher			He and Marty Brennan were leaders of the Gophers and among those arrested during the NYPD's campaign against the city's street gangs.
Chick Hyland			Another lieutenant to Owney Madden. He was later imprisoned for four years.
Owney Madden		1892–1964	The last leader of the Gophers. He later became a successful bootlegger with Bill Dwyer during Prohibition and eventually retired to run the underworld resort in Hot Springs, Arkansas.
Stumpy Malarkey			A prominent member of the Gophers during the turn of the 20th century.
Johnny McArdle			He and Art Biedler killed Patsy Doyle. He was sentenced to thirteen years imprisonment for his role in the murder.
Jack Mulraney		1881-1913	Known as "Happy Jack" due to a facial disfigurement which made him appear to have a permanent smile. He later killed Paddy the Priest, a well-known Hell's Kitchen saloon keeper, for jokingly asking about his smile.
Battle Annie			Popularly known as "Queen of Hell's Kitchen", she led the female contingent known as the Lady Gophers during the 1870s.
Art Biedler			Veteran gunman who was convicted with Johnny McArdle of killing Patsy Doyle and sentenced to eighteen years imprisonment.
William Mott			Known as "Willie the Sailor". He was allegedly involved in planning the murder of Patsy Doyle and was present with girlfriend Margaret Everdeane when Doyle was murdered.
Buck O'Brien			Co-led the Gophers with Owney Madden, O'Brien controlling the area from Forty-Second Street to Fifty-Ninth and from Ninth Avenue to the Hudson River. He was an occasional rival of the Parlor Mob.
Tony Romanello			A close associate of Owney Madden, he was one of several members attacked by Patsy Doyle, who was then attempting to take over the Gophers. Romanello was shot and stabbed after taunting Doyle of losing his girlfriend Freda Horner to Owney Madden.
Bill Tammany			A third lieutenant of Owney Madden. He was eventually sent to Sing Sing to serve a 15-year prison sentence.
Margaret Everdeane			Associate of the Gophers and girlfriend of William Mott. She and Freda Horner were later accused of setting up Patsy Doyle to be killed by Owney Madden, but later testified against the gang leader resulting in his conviction.
Freda Horner			Associate of the Gophers and girlfriend of Owney Madden. Freda had previously been seeing Patsy Doyle and agreed to lure him to a saloon where Owney Madden ambushed and killed him. She and Margaret Everdeane later testified against Owney Madden at the trial for Doyle's murder.
Ida The Goose		fl. 1900–1910	Manhattan showgirl subject to a brief gang war between the Gophers and the Eastman Gang known as the "Ida the Goose War".
Paddy the Priest		d. 1911	Well-known Hell's Kitchen saloonkeeper and criminal associate of the Gophers. He was killed by "Happy" Jack Mulraney for supposedly making a comment regarding his facial disfigurement.
Patsy Doyle		d. 1914	A minor member of the Gophers who attempted to take over the Gophers from Owney Madden, then still recovering from an attempt on his life, and was later killed by Madden after being lured to a saloon by former girlfriend Freda Horner.

=== Grady Gang ===
Name	Portrait	Life	Comments
John D. Grady		d. 1880	Criminal fence and traveling salesmen known as "Traveling Mike". He was the leader of one of the most successful burglary gangs in the Eastern United States financing some of the most infamous robberies in the city's history among these the robbery of nearly $2 million from industrialist Rufus L. Lord in 1866.
Pet Anderson			Sneak thief known as "Boston" Anderson, according to Asbury. He was a participant in the Exchange Place office robbery in 1866, he and Eddie Pettingill taking out the two bins of cash and negotiable securities. Contemporary papers, however, attribute the nickname "Pet" to John Pettingill, named Eddie Pettingill in Asbury's book. Asbury's "Pet Anderson" was probably one Charles Howard, who was arrested with Pettingill and charged in the Lord bond robbery.
William Burke			Another thief known as "Billy the Kid", he was considered one of Grady's best men and was said to have been arrested one hundred times before his 21st birthday.
Eddie Pettingill			Sneak thief who participated in the Exchange Place office robbery when he and Pet Anderson took out two bins of cash and negotiable securities. In contemporary newspapers articles, Pettingill is said to be named John "Pet" Pettingill, while his partner is called Charles Howard.
Jake Rand			Swindler known as John "Greedy Jack" Rand. He planned and led members of the Grady Gang in the robbery of industrialist Rufus L. Lord in 1866. His role was to distract Lord while "Boston" Anderson and Eddie Pettingill sneaked into his Exchange Place office and stole nearly $2 million in cash and negotiable securities.
Horace "Hod" Ennis			A sneak thief and burglar, he assisted Jake Rand planning the Exchange Place robbery and arranging the meeting with Rufus Lord.

=== Hell's Kitchen Gang ===
Name	Portrait	Life	Comments
Dutch Heinrichs		fl. 1860–1874	A thief and bank robber, Dutch Heinrichs was the founder of the Hell's Kitchen Gang which ruled over Hell's Kitchen during the late 1860s and 70s. Convicted for grand larceny and sentenced to ten years imprisonment but became insane while in The Tombs and was eventually committed to the asylum at Wards Island.

=== Hook Gang ===
Name	Portrait	Life	Comments
James Coffee			One of several leaders of the Hook Gang.
Terry Le Strange			One of several leaders of the Hook Gang.
Suds Merrick			One of several leaders of the Hook Gang. He was eventually succeeded by Bum Mahoney after the arrest of his three top men Tommy Bonner, Johnny Gallagher and Sam McCracken.
Tommy Shay			One of several leaders of the Hook Gang.
Slipsley Ward			The principal lieutenant to Bum Mahoney, he was imprisoned for attempting to steal a schooner single-handed from a crew of six men.
Tommy Bonner			A leading member of the Hookers and an associate of Suds Merrick. He was arrested with Sam McCracken and Johnny Gallagher for the 1874 robbery of the canal boat Thomas H. Brick and imprisoned in Auburn Prison.
Johnny Gallagher			Another leading member of the Hookers and criminal associate of Suds Merrick. He was arrested with Sam McCracken and Tommy Bonner for the 1874 robbery of the canal boat Thomas H. Brick and imprisoned in Auburn Prison.
Sam McCracken			A member of the Hookers and associate of Suds Merrick who was arrested with Tommy Bonner and Johnny Gallagher and imprisoned in Auburn Prison for the 1874 robbery of the canal boat Thomas H. Brick.
Piggy Noles			A particularly infamous trickster of the Hookers who once stole a rowboat and sold it back to its original owner. The boat had been repainted and the victim was unaware that it was his own boat that he had purchased.
Bum Mahoney			A former member of the Patsy Conroy Gang, the 23-year-old river pirate became head of the gang after Suds Merrick stepped down as leader in 1874.
Old Flaherty			River pirate and associate of the Hookers. Flaherty was himself the head of a family of criminals and thugs in the Seventh Ward.

=== Hudson Dusters ===
Name	Portrait	Life	Comments
Circular Jack			Co-founder and organizer of the Hudson Dusters with Kid Yorke and Goo Goo Knox.
Mike Costello			A prominent member of the Hudson Dusters, he was the subject of a statewide manhunt by police in New York and New Jersey for his involvement in the murders of Rubber Shaw and Tanner Smith.
Red Farrell		1851–?	Burglar and pickpocket, he was considered one of the oldest street criminals still operating in the city by the time of his arrest for pickpocketing in 1922.
Ding Dong			Colorful member of the Hudson Dusters who led a group of teenage thieves based in Greenwich Village who robbed express wagons by having gang members sneak aboard and toss package to him as he followed the wagon.
Rickey Harrison		d. 1920	A once leading member of the Hudson Dusters. He was eventually convicted of murder and armed robbery and sent to the electric chair at Sing Sing in 1920.
Jack Diamond		1897–1931	He and his brother were both members of the gang during their teenage years. He became a bodyguard to labor racketeer Jacob Orgen during the third "Labor Slugger War" and later became a notorious gunman and bootlegger during Prohibition.
Goo Goo Knox		d. 1921	Co-founder of the Hudson Dusters with Circular Jack and Kid Yorke. He was eventually killed by John Hudson in an underworld dispute over bootlegging.
Rubber Shaw		d. 1919	One of the Hudson Duster's last leaders, Rubber Shaw was killed in a drive-by shooting in retaliation for the gangland murder of Marginals leader Tanner Smith only a few days before.
Honey Stewart			One of the early prominent members of the Hudson Dusters.
Kid Yorke			Co-founder of the Hudson Dusters with Circular Jack and Goo Goo Knox.

=== Humpty Jackson Gang ===
Name	Portrait	Life	Comments
Humpty Jackson		1879-1914	One of the few gang chieftains not allied with either the Eastman or Five Points Gang, A cultured well-educated man with a reportedly fierce temper, he ruled over roughly fifty gangsters from his headquarters in a cemetery between First and Second Avenue to Twelve and Thirteen Streets. He was eventually convicted of murder and later died in prison.
Lobster Kid			A lieutenant of Humpty Jackson.
Spanish Louie		d. 1910	Supposed descendant of mestizo Portuguese or Spanish nobility also known as "Indian Louie", he was a well-known thug-for-hire in Chinatown and the Bowery during the turn of the 20th century. He was a chief lieutenant to Humpty Jackson until his mysterious death.
Nigger Ruhl			A lieutenant of Humpty Jackson.
The Grabber			A lieutenant of Humpty Jackson. He was alleged to have killed Spanish Louie, a fellow member, over a claim that Spanish Louie had cheated him out of the proceeds of a Tammany Hall social function they had co-hosted.

=== Italian Dave Gang ===
Name	Portrait	Life	Comments
Jack Mahaney		1844–?	A protege of the infamous fagin Italian Dave, Mahaney himself became a noted confidence man, burglar and sneak thief.

=== Jimmy Curley Gang ===
Name	Portrait	Life	Comments
James Cariggio		1892–1914	Founder and leader of the Jimmy Curley Gang, his gang committed numerous holdups and armed robberies in Manhattan during the turn of the 20th century. He was also known as "Gold Mine Jimmy".

=== Lenox Avenue Gang ===
Name	Portrait	Life	Comments
Harry Horowitz		1889–1914	Leader of the Lenox Avenue Gang known as "Gyp the Blood".
Frank Cirofici		1887-1914	Veteran gunman known as "Dago Frank", he was described by detective Val O'Ferrell as "the toughest man in the world". Cirofici and his girlfriend Dutch Sadie would often work together as street muggers.
Louis Rosenberg		d. 1914	A pickpocket known as "Lefty Louis", who was later involved in murder for hire.
Jacob Siedenschier		d. 1914	An ex-pugilist known as "Whitey Lewis", who became a noted "black jack artist" under Jack Zelig.

=== Leslie Gang ===
Name	Portrait	Life	Comments
George Leonidas Leslie		1840–1878	Architect turned bank robber, Leslie was one of the great criminal masterminds of the mid-to late 19th century. His burglary gang was responsible for some of the most notorious bank robberies in the United States.
Abe Coakley			A close associate of Leslie, he was involved in the 1878 robbery of the Manhattan Savings Institution.
Jimmy Hope		1836–1905	Bank robber involved in the 1878 robbery of the Manhattan Savings Institution.
Johnny Hope		1856–1906	Son of "Old Jimmy" Hope. Bank robber sent to Sing Sing for his supposed role in the Manhattan Savings Institution.
Bill Kelly			Bank robber involved in the 1878 robbery of the Manhattan Savings Institution.
Red Leary		1840–1888	Bank robber involved in the 1878 robbery of the Manhattan Savings Institution.
Johnny Dobbs		1835–1892	River pirate and burglar associated with the Daybreak Boys and later Marm Mandelbaum and George Leslie. He reportedly handled over $2,000,000 in stolen money as a criminal fence but died in poverty.
Pete Emerson		1845–?	Bank robber known as "Banjo Pete". He was involved in the 1878 robbery of the Manhattan Savings Institution and a suspect in George Leslie's murder in 1884.
Sam Perris		1840–?	Bank robber known as "Worcester Sam". He was involved in the 1878 robbery of the Manhattan Savings Institution and a suspect in the murder of George Leslie in 1884.
Patrick Shevlin		1808–?	A crimine associate of Leslie known as "Patty" Shevlin. He was a participant in the 1878 robbery of the Manhattan Savings Institution, Leslie obtaining a job for him in the bank months before the robbery.
Gilbert Yost		d. 1886	Burglar and bank robber. In 1870, Yost was imprisoned for two years after he and Leslie were caught robbing a jewelry store in Norristown, Pennsylvania.
John Nugent		d. 1904	Police officer associated with Leslie's gang. He was one of the participants of the 1878 robbery of the Manhattan Savings Institution.
Ed Goodie		1848–?	Burglar and butcher cart thief associated with Leslie and Marm Mandelbaum during the 1870s and 80s.
Babe Irving			Sister of Johnny Irving and girlfriend of George Leslie.

=== Little Auggies ===
Name	Portrait	Life	Comments
Jacob Orgen		1894–1927	A former member of Benjamin "Dopey Benny" Fein's organization, he was the founder of the gang and eventually gained control of Manhattan's labor racketeering with the death of Kid Dropper at the end of the third "Labor Slugger War". He himself would be murdered by Louis "Lepke" Buchalter and Gurrah Shapiro several years later.
Louis Kushner		1904–1939	A member of the "Little Augies", Kushner murdered rival gang leader Kid Dropper at the Essex Market Courthouse in 1923. He became an important informant against Louis "Lepke" Buchalter during the 1930s before being hunted down by Murder, Inc. and killed with Isadore Friedman.
Sammy Weiss		1904–?	A lieutenant of Jacob Orgen, he and Orgen were arrested at the time of Kid Dropper's murder but later released.

=== Mandelbaum Gang ===
Name	Portrait	Life	Comments
Fredericka Mandelbaum		1818–1894	One of the most successful criminal fences in New York during the 19th century, "Marm" Mandelbaum hosted extravagant dinner parties attended by her "inner circle" of noted female criminals. She was also closely associated with Bill Mosher, Ed Goodie, Joe Douglas, Mike Kurtz, Shang Draper, Mark Shinburn, Ned Lyons and George Leonidas Leslie.
Big Mary			A successful thief and con artist during the 1860s and 70s.
Ellen Clegg		1841–?	Pickpocket and shoplifter associated with Tilly Miller and Lena Kleinschmidt. She was the wife of James "Old Jimmy" Clegg.
Kid Glove Rosey		1847–?	German-born thief and shoplifter associated with Lena Kleinschmidt.
Lena Kleinschmidt		1835–?	Thief and blackmailer known as "Black Lena". Like Mandelbaum, she herself hosted dinner parties in Hackensack, New Jersey while posing as the widow of a South American mining engineer but was eventually discovered when a guest recognized an emerald ring worn by Kleinschmidt stolen from her handbag.
Sophie Lyons		1848–1924	One of the most notorious confidence women of the 19th century, she and her husband bank robber Ned Lyons were the most hunted criminals in the country.
Queen Liz			Thief and pickpocket who was associated with Marm Mandelbaum during the 1860s and 70s.
Little Annie		fl. 1870–1880	
Old Mother Hubbard		1828–?	An elderly thief, pickpocket and shoplifter, she was one of the most wanted and well-known female criminals in the United States.

=== Marginals ===
Name	Portrait	Life	Comments
Tanner Smith		1887–1919	Founder and leader of the Marginals who rivaled the Hudson Dusters and the Pearl Buttons for control of the Hudson River waterfront. An ally of Owney Madden, he was murdered in an underworld dispute in 1919.

=== Molasses Gang ===
Name	Portrait	Life	Comments
Jimmy Dunnigan			Sneak thief and pickpocket. Co-leader of the Molasses Gang with Billy Morgan and Blind Mahoney.
Blind Mahoney			A member of the Whyos, Mahoney was a co-leader of the Molasses Gang with Jimmy Dunnigan and Billy Morgan.
Billy Morgan			He co-led the Molasses Gang with Jimmy Dunnigan and Blind Mahoney.

=== Nineteenth Street Gang ===
Name	Portrait	Life	Comments
Little Mike			Leader of the Nineteenth Street Gang active in the area between Nineteenth and Thirty-Fourth Streets known as "Poverty Lane".

=== Pansies ===
Name	Portrait	Life	Comments
Riley Rags			Leader of the Pansies. From their headquarters at Avenue A and Eighty-First Street, they frequently raided the East River waterfront.

=== Patsy Conroy Gang ===
Name	Portrait	Life	Comments
Patsy Conroy		1846–?	Fourth Ward river pirate and founder of the Patsy Conroy Gang. He and Larry Griffin were eventually convicted of robbing Robert Emmet's home in White Plains in 1874.
Wreck Donovan			
Bum Mahoney			An associate of Joseph Gayles, he and Billy Woods accompanied him on the ill-fated robbery of the brig Margaret in 1873. He and Woods threw Gayles overboard, believing him to be dead, but he was brought back onto the boat by Mahoney when Gayles regained consciousness but threw him back into the river after he died. Later associated with the Hook Gang and Old Flaherty's criminal family.
Joseph Gayles		d. 1873	River pirate and waterfront thug known as "Socco the Bracer". A chief lieutenant of Patsy Conroy, he was killed in a gun battle with police after failing to hijack to brig Margaret with Bum Mahoney and Billy Woods.
Billy Woods			He accompanied Joseph Gayles in the 1873 robbery of the brig Margaret. During the ensuing shootout with police, he attempted to keep Gayles from coming back aboard the boat but was dissuaded by Mahoney.
Denny Brady			River pirate and burglar who co-led the robbery of the brig Mattan with Larry Griffin in 1873. He was eventually convicted of robbing a house in Catskill.
Pugsy Hurley			
Beeny Kane		fl. 1870	
Scotchy Lavelle			River pirate and bouncer who later opened a saloon on Doyers Street. He served as a mentor to Chuck Conners early in his political career.
Larry Griffin			River pirate and burglar who, with Denny Brady, led the robbery of the brig Mattan in 1873. Griffin was eventually convicted of robbing the house of Robert Emmet in White Plains.
Kid Shanahan		fl. 1883	Gang leader and river pirate. In 1883, he was convicted of the attempted hijacking of the sloop Victor while anchored in Flushing Bay.
Tom The Mick			

=== Potashes ===
Name	Portrait	Life	Comments
Red Shay Meehan			Leader of the Potashes who were based near the Babbit Soap Factory on Washington Street near present-day Rector Street.

=== Slaughter House Gang ===
Name	Portrait	Life	Comments
George Leese			River pirate and member of the Slaughter Housers known as "Snatchem". He also fought in illegal bare knuckle boxing matches at Kit Burns' Sportsman's Hall.

=== Squab Wheelman Gang ===
Name	Portrait	Life	Comments
Crazy Butch			Teenage pickpocket who founded and led the Crazy Butch Gang. He later organized the Squab Wheelmen, allies of Monk Eastman, which he led until his murder by Harry the Soldier.
Darby Kid		fl. 1890	Shoplifter and girlfriend of Crazy Butch.
Little Kishky			Gang member who was accidentally killed when he fell out a window during an "attack drill" staged by Crazy Butch at their headquarters.
Harry The Soldier			One-time friend and lieutenant of Crazy Butch. He eventually killed Crazy Butch in a battle over his former girlfriend the Darby Kid.

=== Tenth Avenue Gang ===
Name	Portrait	Life	Comments
Ike Marsh			Leader of the Tenth Avenue Gang, he and Dutch Heinrichs merged their gangs in order to raid the Hudson River Railroad. He and several gang members robbed an express train at Spuyten Duyvil, the first train robbery in New York's history, stealing an iron box containing greenbacks and government bonds.

=== Tub of Blood Bunch ===
Name	Portrait	Life	Comments
Brian Boru			Member of the Slaughter House Gang. He and Sweeney the Boy lived in a marble yard near Corlears' Hook for twenty years before his mysterious murder.
Sweeney The Boy			Member of the Slaughter House Gang. He lived with fellow gang member Brian Boru in a marble yard near Corlears' Hook for twenty years.
Hop Along Peter			A supposed "half-wit", he was a well-known waterfront thug and said to have a fierce hatred for the police often attacking officers on sight.
Skinner Meehan			
Dutch Hen			
Jack Cody			

=== Walsh Gang ===
Name	Portrait	Life	Comments
Johnny Walsh		1852–1883	Leader of the Walshers known as "Johnny the Mick". Killed in a gunbattle at Shang Draper's saloon with rival gang leader Johnny Irving, who was himself gunned down by Billy Porter.

=== White Hand Gang ===
Name	Portrait	Life	Comments
Richard Lonergan		1900-1925	Known as "Peg Leg" Lonergan, he succeeded Bill Lovett as leader of the White Hand Gang. Feuding with Frankie Yale over control of the Brooklyn waterfront, he and five of his lieutenants were killed at the Adonis Social Club under mysterious circumstances.
Bill Lovett		1894–1923	Labor racketeer and war hero known as "Wild Bill" Lovett. He took control of the White Handers after the murder of Dinny Meehan and kept Italian mobsters out of the Brooklyn waterfront until his murder by the Sicilian assassin Dui Cuteddi in 1923.
Dinny Meehan		1889-1920	Early leader of the White Handers involved in extortion and drug peddling. He was killed in his home in 1920.

=== Whyos Gang ===
Name	Portrait	Life	Comments
Johnny Dolan		1850–1876	An inventive member of the Whyos known as "Dandy" Dolan. He developed a number of weapons for use by gang members in street fights and burglaries. He was convicted of the murder of businessman James H. Noe and executed in 1876.
Danny Driscoll		1860–1888	He and Danny Lyons co-led the Whyos during the 1880s. Convicted for the murder of Five Points prostitute Bridget "Beezy" Garrity, he was hanged in 1888.
Piker Ryan			An enterprising member of the Whyos who was the first to keep records of the Whyos criminal activities. A list of "services" was found in his possession when arrested by police in 1884.
Red Rocks Farrell		1857–?	One of the more colorful gang members, Farrell was eventually sent to Sing Sing for drugging and then robbing an ex-police officer in 1884.
Josh Hines			Known as "Big Josh", he was a particularly skilled extortionist and was the first man to hold up a stuss game.
Bull Hurley			
Danny Lyons		1860-1888	Co-leader of the Whyos with Danny Driscoll during the 1880s. He was convicted of killing Joseph Quinn in an underworld feud over local prostitute Kitty McGowan and hanged in 1888.
Fig McGerald			
Mike McGloin		1862-1883	Leader of the Whyos during the late 1870s and early 80s. He was convicted for the murder of saloon keeper Louis Hanier and executed in 1883.
Slops Connolly			
Baboon Connolly			
Googles Corcoran			
Hoggy Walsh			

=== Yakey Yakes ===
Name	Portrait	Life	Comments
Yakey Yake Brady		1875–1904	Founder and leader of the Yakey Yakes who were active around the Brooklyn Bridge. The gang disbanded shortly after Brady died from tuberculosis.

=== Yiddish Black Hand ===
Name	Portrait	Life	Comments
Johnny Levinsky			Co-leader of the Yiddish Black Hand with Joseph Toplinsky and Charles Vitoffsky involved in poisoning horses and extorting livery stables.
Joseph Toplinsky		1883-1944	Horse poisoner and co-leader of the Yiddish Black Hand with Johnny Levinsky and Charles Vitoffsky.
Charles Vitoffsky			Co-leader of the Yiddish Black Hand with Johnny Levinsky and Charles Vitoffsky. Known as "Charley the Cripple", he was involved in extortion from soda and seltzer deliveries.

=== Independent leaders ===
Name	Portrait	Life	Comments
Joe Baker			East Side Gang leader involved in a gang war with Joe Morello and the Morello crime family.
Big Nose Bunker			Gang leader who ran a dive bar near Johnny Camphine's saloon. Involved in a fight with a waterfront thug, he was stabbed six times in the stomach and four of his fingers were chopped off. He arrived at a nearby police station where he asked for a surgeon to reattach his fingers but died from blood loss before an ambulance could arrive.
Ralph Daniello		1886-1925	Labor racketeer known as "Ralph the Barber", he was allied with Philip Paul during the first "Labor Slugger War".
Benjamin Fein		1889-1962	Underworld figure who, with Joseph Rosenzweig, controlled "labor slugging" and labor racketeering in New York until the first "Labor Slugger War".
Abie Fisher			Gang leader and labor racketeer allied with Philip Paul during the first "Labor Slugger War".
Porkie Flaherty			Gang leader and labor racketeer active on the Lower East Side. He was one of several men allied with Philip Paul during the first "Labor Slugger War".
Jimmy Haggerty		d. 1871	Philadelphia gang leader and bank robber. "Wild Jimmy" Haggerty was killed in a barroom brawl by Reddy the Blacksmith in 1871.
Pickles Laydon			Gang leader allied with Philip Paul during the first "Labor Slugger War".
Benjamin Levinsky		1893–1922	Gang leader and labor racketeer. Killed by rival William Lipshitz in 1922.
Billy Lustig		d. 1913	Gang leader and labor racketeer allied with Philip Paul during the first "Labor Slugger War".
Punk Madden			Gang leader and labor racketeer allied with Philip Paul during the first "Labor Slugger War".
Albert Rooney		1892–?	Founder and leader of the Fourteenth Street Gang. He was one of the last gang captains of the "Gangs of New York" period and was one of the high-profile underworld figures to be convicted during the NYPD's campaign against the city's street gang from 1911 to 1914.
Joseph Rosenzweig		1891-?	Organized crime figure who controlled labor racketeering with Benjamin Fein prior to the first "Labor Slugger War".
Philip Paul		d. 1914	Gang leader and labor racketeer known as "Pinchy Paul". He led a coalition of independent gang leaders against Joseph Rosenzweig and Benjamin Fein during the first "Labor Slugger War" until his murder in 1914.
Joseph Quinn		1861–1887	Alleged gangster and rival of Whyos leader Danny Lyons who was killed in a dispute over prostitute Kitty McGowan.
Abe Roch			Independent gang leader and labor racketeer known as "Little Rhody". He was involved in the first Labor Slugger War as an ally of Philip Paul and later testified at the trial of Joseph Rosenzweig.
Frank Salvatore			Former bootblack and Tammany Hall political organizer known as "Mike the Dago". Around the turn of the 20th century, he founded the Young Chuck Conners Association and displaced Conners as the political boss of Chinatown.
Benjamin Snyder			Labor racketeer under Joseph Rosenzweig who murdered rival Philip Paul. He eventually agreed to become a witness for the state resulting in the conviction of Rosenzweig and other "labor sluggers" operating in the city.

== Other criminals ==
Name	Portrait	Life	Comments
George Appo		1858–1930	The son of a Chinese father and an Irish mother, Appo was a famed pickpocket and longtime resident of Donovan's Lane near the Five Points. A Pickpocket's Tale: the Underworld of Nineteenth-Century New York by Timothy J. Gilfoyle (2006) uses Appo's own memoir as its basis.
Leon L.J. Bernard			Disgraced reverend who embezzled $1,400,000 from the See of Tournai in Belgium. He was pursued by New York detective Joseph Dorcy and eventually captured in Veracruz.
Joe Douglas and Bill Mosher		d. 1874	Pair of burglars alleged to have been involved in the Charley Ross kidnapping case. Months after the kidnapping, both men were killed attempting to rob the home of Judge Van Brunt.
Jack Frenchy			Algerian-born criminal known as "Jack Frenchy" alleged to be "Jack the Ripper" and wrongly accused of the murder of Bowery prostitute Old Shakespeare.
Albert E. Hicks		1820–1860	Waterfront thief and freelance gunman who murdered the three-man crew of the oyster sloop E.A. Johnson after being shanghaied.
Ludwig the Bloodsucker			Bowery character who resided near Bismark Hall and the House of Commons and is claimed to have "quaffed human blood as if it were wine".
Old Flaherty		1824–?	River pirate who was the head of a family of criminals and thugs in the Seventh Ward. He and his wife were later sent to Blackwell's Island.
Mme. Restell		1812–1878	Abortionist known as "Madam Killer", she was worth over $500,000 during her lifetime.
Henry G. Romaine			Grave robber involved in the theft and ransom of the body of industrialist Alexander T. Stewart.
Peter Sawyer			Californian thief and robber who was the first criminal to begin drugging people for the purposes of robbing them during the late 1860s.

=== Burglars and sneak thieves ===
Name	Portrait	Life	Comments
Mike Byrnes			Burglar known as "Old Dublin", who operated an illegal still on Twenty-Sixth Street.
Barney Friery		1844–1866	Thief who killed "London" Izzy Lazarus in an underworld dispute.
Harry "London Izzy" Lazarus		1839–1865	English-born saloon keeper and thief known as "London Izzy". He was one of three sons born to pugilist Israel "London Izzy" Lazarus.
Dan Noble		1846–?	English-born thief and burglar.
Mark Shinburn		1838–1915	
Mary Varley			Bowery sneak thief and shoplifter, the younger sister of Reddy the Blacksmith.

=== Confidence men and swindlers ===
Name	Portrait	Life	Comments
Joseph Lewis		1850–1902?	Confidence and banco man known as "Hungry Joe Lewis". He once swindled $5,000 from Irish author Oscar Wilde while visiting the United States in 1882.
Charles P. Miller		1851–1881	New Orleans gambler known as "King of the Banco Men", who ran one of the largest banco operations in the United States during the late 19th century.
Tom O'Brien		1850–1904	Swindler and banco man who organized confidence schemes in New Orleans and New York. He often partnered with Joseph "Hungry Joe" Lewis.
Reed Waddell		1859–1895	Confidence man and trickster credited as the inventor of the "gold brick" swindle. Killed by partner Tom O'Brien in 1895.

=== Fences and financers ===
Name	Portrait	Life	Comments
Joe Erich		fl. 1850–1860	Underworld figure and the city's premier fence during the 1850s.
Rosanna Peers			The earliest known criminal fence, whose Center Street grocery store and dive bar was used as the headquarters of the Forty Thieves.
Old Unger			Fence and underworld figure whose Eldrige Street residence was a hangout for sneak thieves and pickpockets.
Ephraim Snow			Underworld figure known as "Old Snow", who owned a dry goods store at Grand and Allen Streets which competed against rival fence Joe Erich.

=== Gamblers ===
Name	Portrait	Life	Comments
The Bottler		d. 1908	A Five Points gambler who was forced by Kid Twist to make Kid Dahl, a member of the Eastman Gang, a partner is his Suffolk Street stuss parlor.
William Busteed		1848–1924	Owner of a popular Broadway gambling resort and a chief competitor of "Honest" John Kelly.
Richard Canfield		1855–1914	Longtime sportsman and gambler who, as the successor of John Morrissey, owned a number of prominent establishments and gambling spots including Morrissey's resort at Saratoga Springs. His gambling house at Forty-Fourth Street was considered the most popular gaming resort in the United States until its close in 1902.
John Daly		1838–1906	Owner of a popular Broadway gambling resort and a rival of John Kelly.
Dinky Davis			Owner of a popular Broadway gambling resort and a rival of John Kelly.
Sam Emery			Owner of a popular Broadway gambling resort and a rival of John Kelly.
Pat Hearne		d. 1859	Herne was an associate of Reuben Parsons who owned a successful Broadway gambling house during the 1840s and 50s. He himself was an avid gambler and, on more than one occasion, he supposedly gambled away an entire night's takings and his own place.
Kid Jigger			A former gunman-turned-gambler, Kid Jigger operated one of the most successful stuss parlors in Manhattan's East Side. Johnny Spanish attempted to murder Kid Jigger after a failed extortion attempt but instead killed an eight-year-old girl during the gunfight and was forced to flee the city for a time.
Davy Johnson		d. 1911	Owner of a Broadway gambling resort, The Roseben, and a rival competitor of John Kelly.
Reuben Parsons			A native New Englander who controlled New York's illegal gambling and policy banks during the mid-19th century. He was commonly known as the "Great American Faro Banker" in the city's underworld.
Sam Paul		1874–1927	An associate of Charles Becker, he and Bridgie Webber ran the popular Sans Souci Music Hall in addition to illegal gambling.
Jack Rose		1875–1947	A gambler known as "Bald Jack", who was one of several men who ran second-rate gambling houses for Jack Zelig, he later testified against Charles Becker during the Becker-Rosenthal trial.
Herman Rosenthal		1883–1912	An underworld bookmaker and part-time gambler who was forced to make Detective Charles Becker a partner in his gambling operation. He was later murdered by the Lenox Avenue Gang on orders from Becker when he threatened to reveal Becker's role as an underworld figure.
Sam Schepps		1873–1936	Schepps ran gambling houses for Jack Zelig and later testified at the Becker-Rosenthal trial.
Harry Vallon			Vallon was another associate involved in illegal gambling for Jack Zelig and later testified at the Becker-Rosenthal trial.
Wah Kee			The first major underworld figure to arrive in Chinatown, Wah Kee ran illegal gambling and an opium den from the room above his Pell Street grocery store. His shop became popular among residents in the Bowery and Chatham Square. His success encouraged other Cantonese, particularly Chinese Tongs, to settle in Chinatown during the next several decades.
Bridgie Webber		1877–1936	An associate of Charles Becker, he and Sam Paul ran the Sans Souci Music Hall together. Webber also ran illegal gambling houses for Jack Zelig.

=== Prostitutes ===
Name	Portrait	Life	Comments
Crazy Lou		d. 1886	Bowery prostitute and dance hall girl.
Bunty Kate		fl. 1887	Five Points prostitute of Whyos leader Danny Lyons.
Beezy Garrity		d. 1886	Five Points prostitute killed during a shootout between Whyos leader Danny Driscoll and John McCarty.
Gentle Maggie		fl. 1887	Five Points prostitute under Danny Lyons.
Hoochie-Coochie Mary			A longtime Chinatown resident and prostitute. Found the body of murdered Chinese comic Ah Hoon in 1909.
Jane the Grabber			Madam and procuress involved in kidnapping young women and forcing them into prostitution and white slavery during the 1870s.
Lizzie The Dove		fl. 1887	Five Points prostitute under Danny Lyons.
Pretty Kitty McGowan		fl. 1887	Five Points prostitute and subject of a gunfight between Danny Lyons and Joseph Quinn.
Red Light Lizzie			Procuress and rival of "Jane the Grabber", she owned half a dozen brothels and was a supplier of prostitutes to similar establishments.
Old Shakespeare		d. 1891	Bowery prostitute and alleged murder victim of Jack the Ripper.

== City officials ==
=== Police ===
Name	Portrait	Life	Comments
Captain Anthony J. Allaire		1820–1903	Head of the Eighteenth police precinct, overseeing the area between Houston and Fifth Street, he was responsible for driving out and breaking up the Dutch Mob in 1877.
Detective Charles Becker		1869–1915	Police detective who, as head of the Gambling Squad, used strong arm tactics to extort illegal gamblers. His role as an underworld figure was revealed when he was convicted and executed for ordering members of the Lenox Avenue Gang to murder gambler Herman Rosenthal.
Inspector Thomas F. Byrnes		1842–1910	Police chief and head of the NYPD Detective Bureau from 1880 until 1895. During his career, he was responsible for the arrests of countless gang leaders and other criminals of the era. He was also the detective in charge of the murder investigation of Bowery prostitute and supposed Jack the Ripper victim Old Shakespeare.
Daniel D. Conover		1822–1896	Civil servant whose appointment by Governor John King as the city street commissioner was blocked by the Mayor of New York Fernando Wood in favor Charles Devlin. The position was said to have been bought for the sum of $50,000 and resulted in the Police Riot of 1857.
Sergeant John D. Coughlin		1874–1951	Police inspector involved during Chinatown's Tong wars. He was charged with the protection of Chinese comic Ah Hoon prior to his murder by the Hip Sing Tong.
Captain Timothy J. Creedon		1840–?	Police official implicated in police corruption investigations during the 1890s. Admitted that he had paid $15,000 to "fixers" for Tammany Hall in exchange for his position.
Captain William S. Devery		1854–1919	The last superintendent of the New York City Police Department police commission, "Big Bill" Devery was later appointed its first police chief.
Detective Joseph M. Dorcy			Police detective who pursued and captured a number of high-profile criminals, most notably, Whyos gang member Johnny Dolan in 1875 and embezzler Leon L.J. Bernard in 1876.
Deputy Commissioner George Samuel Dougherty		1865–1931	Police official who led detective squads in numerous raids during the NYPD's first campaign against New York's street gangs resulting in the arrests of over one hundred gang members.
Commissioner Simeon Draper		1804–1866	Police commissioner during the Police Riot of 1857 and later Collector of the Port of New York during the American Civil War.
Commissioner Richard Edward Enright		1871–1953	Police commissioner from 1918 to 1922. He investigated Tammany Hall's "Honest" John Kelly and his links into illegal gambling including having his Vendome Club under surveillance.
Inspector Joseph A. Faurot		1872–1942	Police detective and fingerprint expert involved in the Becker-Rosenthal trial. He convinced the widowed Becker to remove the silver plate, placed on the coffin itself, which claimed that Governor Whitman had murdered her husband and would likely be prosecuted for criminal libel.
Captain George W. Gastlin		1835-1895	First leader of the "Steamboat Squad" which eventually cleared out the waterfront area of river pirates, including breaking up the Hook Gang, by 1890.
Captain William H. "Big Bill" Hodgins		1856–1912	Head of the Elizabeth Street Station. He and a group of Chinese-American merchants helped negotiate a truce between Four Brothers, Hip Sing and On Leong Tongs during the Tong wars.
Chief George Washington Matsell		1811–1877	Police chief who battled river pirates in the Fourth Ward and later the area between the Seventh Ward and Corlears' Hook during the 1850s. His force of detectives and volunteer civilians were eventually able to break up the area's biggest gang the Daybreak Boys.
Inspector George W. McClusky		1861–1912	Police official who led the NYPD Detectives Bureau and was involved in the Becker-Rosenthal trial.
Captain John H. McCullagh		1842–1893	Police official who closed down a number of well known panel houses including Shang Draper's operation which led to the breakup of his criminal gang.
Captain Charles McDonnell		1841–1888	Police official who investigated vice districts, especially forced prostitution and white slavery, and arrested procuress "Jane the Grabber".
Commissioner Douglas I. McKay		1879–1962	Senior police official who organized and led the NYPD's first campaign to rid the city of street gangs. Supported by reform Mayor John Purroy Mitchel, he also instituted police reforms.
Sergeant John J. O'Connell		1884–1946	Police detective assigned to the District Attory's office. He led a police squad against Owney Madden and Tanner Smith arresting the gang leaders after a gun battle.
Inspector Joseph Petrosino		1860–1909	Police detective and first chief of the NYPD's "Italian Squad". He was one of the earliest law enforcement officers to investigate organized crime and was later murdered in Palermo, Sicily while tracking down Black Hand extortionists.
Captain Max F. Schmittberger		1850–1917	Police official implicated during investigations into police corruption. Testified that, as a police sergeant in the Tenderloin district, he collected payments from saloons, illegal gambling houses and other establishments and delivered to then precinct captain William Devery.
Patrolman Dennis Sullivan			Police officer assigned to the Charles Street police station who waged one man war against the Hudson Dusters. He was successful in arresting ten gang members single-handed before he was ambushed and brutally attacked by a group of the gang. A poem mocking the incident was later composed by its leader One Lung Curran and remained a popular underworld verse for a number of years.
Inspector Alexander S. Williams		1839–1917	Police detective known as "Clubber Williams", who oversaw the Tenderloin and Gas House districts. In 1871, he led a "strong arm squad" into the district and was successful in breaking up the Gas House Gang.
Captain Cornelius Willemse		1872–1942	Police detective who patrolled the Lower East Side, Chinatown and the Tenderloin district as well as briefly heading the NYPD Homicide Division.
Commissioner Arthur Woods		1870–1942	Senior police official who succeeded Douglas McCay as police commissioner and continued the NYPD's campaign against the city's street gangs.

=== Draft riots ===
Name	Portrait	Life	Comments
Military
Secretary of War Edwin M. Stanton		1814–1869	Overall commander of military forces in New York, Stanton authorized five regiments from Gettysburg to assist the New York Police Department in putting an end to the riots.
Provost Marshal James Fry		1827–1894	Provost Marshal who organized and was charged with enforcing conscription in New York City along with assistant Provost Marshal Colonel Robert Nugent.
Brigadier General Harvey Brown		1795–1874	Commanding officer of regular Union Army forces in New York City, including reinforcements sent from Gettysburg, and directed military forces from police commissioner Thomas Action's office.
Major General C.W. Sandford		1796–1878	Veteran of the Police Riots of 1857, he was a senior officer under Brigadier General Harvey Brown and organized the defense of the arsenal on Seventh Avenue.
Colonel Thaddeus P. Mott		1831–1894	Commanding a troop of cavalry and howitzers, he engaged a mob of rioters who had reportedly hung three African Americans in the area of Thirty-Second Street and Eighth Avenue and successfully dispersed with artillery fire.
Colonel H. J. O'Brien		c. 1825-1863	Commander of the 11th New York Volunteers, who rushed to support police at the battle over the Seventh Avenue arsenal. He later visited his nearby home to visit his family, whom he discovered had left to stay with relatives in Brooklyn, he was caught by a local mob and slowly tortured to death.
Colonel Cleveland Winslow		1836–1864	Senior officer who led a large military force with Major Robinson and Colonel Jardine against rioters on First Avenue but were forced to flee after suffering a large number of casualties.
Colonel Robert Nugent		1824–1901	Under Provost Marshal Colonel James Fry, Nugent was involved in overseeing the enforcement of the draft. Although considered a war hero of the original Irish Brigade, he later became a target during the riots as his home was attacked and looted by a mob.
Colonel E.E. Jardine		1828–1893	Commander of Hawkins' Zouaves, he served as a senior artillery officer to Colonel Cleveland Winslow and other military officers during the riots.
Captain Joel B. Erhardt		1838–1909	Provost Marshal assigned to the Ninth District and was attacked by several men as he attempted to collect names at a building on Broadway and Liberty Street. He battled the men for three hours, armed only with a pistol, before forced to return to headquarters without the names.
Captain John H. Howell			Senior artillery officer under Colonel Thaddeus Mott and participant in the battle for the Seventh Avenue arsenal.
Captain Henry F. Putnam			Senior artillery officer under Brigadier General Harvey Brown. He led a detachment to Second Avenue where he relieved twenty-five soldiers and policemen trapped by rioters in Jackson's Foundry.
Lieutenant Eagleson			Senior artillery officer under Colonel H.J. O'Brien and participant in the battle for the Seventh Avenue arsenal.
Police
Superintendent John A. Kennedy		1803–1873	Police chief of the NYPD, he assisted Colonel Robert Nugent in the organization and enforcement of the draft. He was attacked by a mob during an inspection of draft offices, unaware of early rioting, and was severely injured by a mob after leaving his carriage to investigate smoke coming from the Provost Marshal's office on Third Avenue. Rescued by John Eagan, who was able to convince the crowd he was dead, Kennedy was taken to police headquarters and then to a hospital where he remained for the duration of the riots.
Commissioner Thomas Coxon Acton		1823–1898	Senior police official who held joint command over police with Commissioner John Bergen after the attack on Superintendent John Kennedy. A prominent Republican politician, he was one of the founders of the Union League Club.
Commissioner John G. Bergen		1814–1867	Senior police official and commander of police forces with Commissioner Thomas Acton. Bergen oversaw police operations in Staten Island and Brooklyn while Acton took charge in Manhattan.
Inspector Daniel C. Carpenter		1816–1866	Police detective who led squads against rioters in Broadway, the Fourth Ward, Second Avenue and other areas.
Inspector John S. Folk		1811–1885	Police detective who led one hundred patrolman against rioters in Uptown Manhattan and co-led a large group of policemen with Inspector Daniel Carpenter against rioters in City Hall Park then fleeing after a failed attack on the New York Tribune. Folk later returned to Brooklyn where he was involved in suppressing rioting during the next few days and similarly saved the Brooklyn Eagle.
Captain James Z. Bogart		1821–1881	Led the "Broadway Squad" and reserve members of the Thirty-First Precinct against rioters looting the home of J.S. Gibbons, cousin of Horace Greeley, at Lamartine Place.
Captain Samuel Brower			Police official who led a police detachment to cut down African Americans who had been hung from lamp posts.
Captain John Cameron		1807–1873	Commander of the Eighteenth Precinct. He organized the defense of the State Armory and other buildings in the area.
Captain John F. Dickson		1821–1880	Co-led a police force with drill officer Theron Copeland who defeated rioters in Clarkston Street and chased off mobs attacking African Africans. His men discovered the body of William Jones who had been tied to a tree and tortured to death.
Captain George W. Dilks		1826–1901	Led a force of two hundred officers into Second Avenue and recaptured the Union Steam Works, then being used as a headquarters and rallying point for rioters along the East Side Manhattan, after fierce hand-to-hand fighting against roughly five hundred rioters.
Captain A.P. Devoursney			One of the officers who defended the New York Tribune during the New York draft riots.
Captain John Jourdan		1831–1870	Led group of sixty men from the Sixth Precinct which battled rioters for over five hours while patrolling African American settlements north and east of the Five Points district during the first day of rioting.
Captain Galen T. Porter		1807–1883	Police official under Superintendent Kennedy involved in organizing police detachments against rioters. During the first hours, he sent sixty patrolmen to reinforce police against rioters on Third Avenue.
Captain Francis C. Speight		1816–1877	Commanded police forces guarding the Broadway draft office. A number of his officers, including Sergeants Wade, Mangin, McCredie and Wolfe, later participated in fighting rioters at Third Avenue and Forty-Fourth Street.
Captain Johannes C. Slott			He and Captain George Walling led an advanced guard into Ninth Avenue but forced to retreat under heavy fire from rioters.
Captain Thomas S. Steers		1804–1884	Attempted to make a last stand at Thirty-Fifth Street but whose force was one of many overwhelmed by rioters. Father of Henry V. Steers, longtime precinct captain of New York City Hall.
Captain Thomas Woolsey Thorne		1823–1885	Police official who commanded the Twenty-Sixth Precinct, operating from the basement of City Hall, and organized the defense of the New York Tribune. He was also a participant in the Police Riot of 1857.
Captain George W. Walling		1823–1891	Police official who organized the first "Strong Arm Squad" which was responsible for breaking up the Honeymoon Gang in 1853. Sided with Mayor Fernando Wood during the Police Riot of 1857 but later served a warrant for the mayor's arrest. He played a major role during the draft riots breaking up several large mobs in the Bowery and other nearby districts.
Captain Jacob B. Warlow		1818–1890	Led detachment from the First Precinct against rioters in the waterfront area and later took part in the defense of the New York Tribune.
Sergeant Francis J. Banfield		1827–1883	Officer in charge of the State Armory at Second Avenue and Twenty-First Street. He was also a member of the "Steamboat Squad" later in his career.
Sergeant Cornelius Burdick			He led thirty-two police officers of the "Broadway Squad", and also included Roundsmen Ferris and Sherwood, who relieved Sergeant Francis Banfield and his men who were defending state armory.
Sergeant Theron S. Copeland		1831–1905	Drill officer who co-led a police force with Captain John Dickson against rioters in Clarkston Street who were attacking local African Africans residents. It was their detachment which discovered the body of William Jones who had been tied to a tree and tortured to death.
Sergeant Frederick Ellison			Patrolman who led one of the first detachments against rioters, he was cut off from his men during the fighting at Third Avenue and Forty-Fourth Street and severely beaten by a mob. He remained unconscious throughout the fighting and was not rescued until the arrival of Sergeant Wade several hours later.
Sergeant John Mangin		1828–1897	Officer in command of a police detachment with fellow Sergeant S.B. Smith. Their later arrival eventually resulted in the defeat of rioters at Third Avenue and Forty-Fourth Street.
Sergeant Robert A. McCredie			Known as "Fighting Mac", he participated in the fighting at Third Avenue and Forty-Fourth Street. He and Sergeant Wolfe spearheaded an attack against rioters as police were slowly being driven down Third Avenue. McCredie forced the rioters back to Forty-Fifth Street but were eventually overwhelmed.
Sergeant Stephen B. Smith			He and Sergeant John Mangin led a detachment of police officers who helped Sergeant Wade defeat rioters at Third Avenue and Forty-Fourth Street.
Sergeant Van Orden			Officer who defended the State Arsenal at Seventh Avenue and Thirty-Fifth Street against rioters during the first day of rioting. He had been ordered by Superintendent Kennedy to protect the building after reports that members of the Knights of the Golden Circle would attempt to capture the arsenal.
Sergeant Wade			Officer who commanded police during the fighting at Third Avenue and Forty-Fourth Street. Although the rioters initially forced police to retreat, he regrouped the remaining patrolman and managed to disperse the mob with the later arrival of Sergeants John Mangin and S.B. Smith.
Sergeant Wolfe			A participant in the fighting against rioters at Third Avenue and Forty-Fourth Street, he and Sergeant Robert McCredie forced the rioters back to Forty-Fifth Street but were eventually overwhelmed by the thousands of advancing rioters.
Others
John Decker		1823–1892	Chief Engineer of the New York City Fire Department.
Joe Howard, Jr.		1833–1908	Journalist and author of a hoax document published in the New York World and the Journal of Commerce which falsely claimed that President Abraham Lincoln had issued a proclamation to conscript 400,000 men into the Union Army. This caused a minor riot when, in May 1864, a mob threatened to storm the Journal of Commerce. Howard was eventually arrested by detectives and escorted under a military armed guard where he was held at Fort Lafayette.
Henry J. Raymond		1820–1869	Journalist and writer for The New York Times who extensively covered the New York Draft Riots.

=== Politicians ===
Name	Portrait	Life	Comments
Peter Cooper		1791–1883	
Richard Croker		1843–1922	Succeeded John Kelly as leader of Tammany Hall and remained a dominant influence in the city's politics up until the turn of the 20th century. Croker had a long history of receiving kickbacks and bribes from saloons, brothels and gambling dens throughout his political career but was cleared by the Lexow Committee. He was involved in bare-knuckle boxing and alleged to have been involved in the leader of the Fourth Avenue Tunnel Gang during his youth.
Thomas F. "Big Tom" Foley		1852–1925	Saloon keeper and political organizer for Tammany Hall, "Big Tom" Foley employed Monk Eastman and his gang to commit election fraud on behalf of the political organization. He later served as a mediator between Eastman and Paul Kelly during the gang war between the Eastmans and the Five Points Gang. Foley Square in Lower Manhattan is named for him.
Warren W. Foster		1859–1943	Attorney, judge and secretary for Tammany Hall. He was involved in the sentencing of many underworld figures between 1910 and 1915.
William J. Gaynor		1849–1913	One-time Mayor of New York who publicly remanded the NYPD of police brutality after a meeting with gang leader Tanner Smith who claimed had been beaten by police when he and Owney Madden had been playing cards. He later passed Order No. 7 which prohibited an officer from using his club unless he could prove his life was in danger.
Hugh J. Grant		1857–1910	Tammany Hall candidate who defeated Abram Hewitt to become Mayor of New York in 1888. His election was a result of a split between the Democrat-affiliated Tammany Hall and New York County Democracy parties. Previously closed saloons, dive bars and other establishments resumed operations, but few were able to recover from Hewitt's reforms. Much of the traditional vice district of Sixth Avenue shifted to the old Tenth Ward by 1890.
Abram Stevens Hewitt		1822–1903	Although Tammany Hall had supported Hewitt in his election campaign, Hewitt attacked Tammany political organizers by closing down a number of illegal establishments, including those owned by Billy McGlory, Frank Stephenson, Harry Hill and Theodore Allen. He also shut down underworld saloons and dive bars in Satan's Circus and other such vice districts. Became mayor in 1886 amid charges of election fraud by Henry George supporters.
Max Hochstein		1868-1921	Attorney and political "fixer" for Charles "Silver Dollar Smith" Solomon.
Bill Howe		1828–1902	Founder of the Howe and Hummel law firm who represented a number of underworld figures with his partner Abe Hummel throughout the 19th century.
Abe Hummel		1849–1926	Co-founder of the successful law firm Howe and Hummel with Bill Howe with whom they represented many of the city's criminal figures up until the turn of the 20th century. Five years after the death of Bill Howe, "Little Abe" Hummel was convicted of suborning perjury and sentenced to one year imprisonment.
John Kelly		1822–1886	Longtime leader of Tammany Hall during the mid-to late 19th century. Known as "Honest John" Kelly, he was involved in graft and illegal gambling.
Dan Kerrigan		1843–1880	Tammany Hall political organizer, saloon keeper and noted pugilist who once fought Australian Kelly in a three and a half hour bout.
George Law		1806–1881	A leader of the Know Nothing movement, he lent the NYPD use of his clipper yacht the Grapeshot to apprehend Lew Baker and bring him back to New York to stand trial for the murder of William "Bill the Butcher" Poole.
John Purroy Mitchel		1879–1918	Reform candidate who defeated William J. Gaynor to become Mayor of New York. He rescinded Order No. 7 and worked with the NYPD to launch the city's first major campaign against the New York underworld from 1910 to 1914.
George Opdyke		1805–1880	Succeeded Fernando Wood as Mayor of New York. During the New York draft riots, he worked with both the NYPD and the military to restore order in the city. His home was targeted by rioters but were turned back by a fifty-man citizen guard.
Charles A. Perkins		1869–1930	District Attorney who battled against labor racketeering in New York during the first "Labor Slugger War". He also helped prosecute many of the city's notorious criminals during the NYPD's campaign against the street gangs in New York from 1911 to 1914.
Horatio Seymour		1810–1886	Governor of New York. During the New York draft riots, he and Mayor George Opdyke were able to convince Archbishop John Hughes to address the rioters to disband.
Alfred E. Smith		1873–1944	A powerful member of Tammany Hall from the turn of the 20th century up until the Second World War. Democratic candidate during the United States presidential election of 1928, he was the first Irish Catholic to run for the presidency of the United States.
Charles S. Solomon		1843–1899	Tammany Hall political organizer known as "Silver Dollar Smith". Solomon was the political boss of the old Tenth Ward district and owner of the Silver Dollar Saloon in Essex Street across the street from Market Street Court.
Tim Sullivan		1862–1913	Was perhaps one of the most influential and powerful political figures in Tammany Hall during the turn of the 20th century. "Big Tim" Sullivan was also the first politician to form relationships with organized crime figures such as Monk Eastman and Paul Kelly.
Tim Sullivan		1869–1909	Younger cousin of Tim Sullivan known as "Little Tim".
Edward Swann		1862–1945	District Attorney who succeeded Charles Perkins and continued efforts to prosecute labor racketeers during the "Labor Slugger War" period. He was unable, however, to gain enough evidence against many of those charged by Perkins and forced to dismiss indictments for a number of union officials and organized crime figures in 1917.
Robert Van Wyck		1849–1918	The first Mayor of New York after the Bronx, Brooklyn, Queens and Richmond were merged with Manhattan. He was a longtime ally and supporter of NYPD Police Chief William Devery despite Rev. Charles Parkhurst's evidence of his corrupt administration.
Charles S. Whitman		1868–1947	District Attorney who prosecuted a number of high-profile criminals and underworld figures, most notably, police detective Charles Becker and the Lenox Avenue Gang for the 1912 murder of gambler Herman Rosenthal.
Fernando Wood		1812–1881	One of the city's most colorful political figures, he was an early member of Tammany Hall and served as the mayor of New York during the 1850s and early 1860s.

=== Tammany Hall sluggers ===
Name	Portrait	Life	Comments
Lew Baker			Ex-police officer and associate of John Morrissey who together fought against the nativist Know Nothings during the 1840s and 50s. In 1855, Baker shot and killed William "Bill the Butcher" Poole.
Paudeen McLaughlin		1822–1858	Former pugilist employed by Tammany Hall. He and Jim Turner were present during the murder of William Poole.
Jim Turner			Californian thug hired by Tammany Hall. He was present with Paudeen McLaughlin when Lew Baker killed William Poole.
Captain Isaiah Rynders		1804–1885	Political organizer and "fixer" for Tammany Hall. He organized many so-called "sluggers" which battled the Know Nothings as well as committed voter intimidation and election fraud on behalf of Tammany Hall during the 1840s and 1850s.
Country McCleester			Sportsman and ex-pugilist employed by Tammany Hall. He supported bare-knuckle boxer Yankee Sullivan in his feud with rival Tom Hyer to whom he lost to in a match for the American heavyweight championship in 1841.
Edward Z.C. Judson		1821–1886	Publisher and writer who was associated with Isaiah Rynders and Tammany Hall during the 1840s.
Dirty Face Jack			An associate of Isaiah Rynders, he and Country McCleester were alleged to have instigated the Astor Place Riot in 1849.

== Other personalities ==
=== Bowery Bums ===
Name	Portrait	Life	Comments
Jack Dempsey			Bowery panhandler and resident of the infamous "Dump".
Jim Farrell			A prominent Bowery panhandler who, becoming blind from excessive drinking, was said to have been carried out of John Kelly's dive screaming and died in an alcoholics ward in Bellevue Hospital soon after.
Tom Frizzell			Known as "King of the Panhandlers", Frizzell was a well-known character in the Bowery.
Whitey Sullivan		1871-1903	Bowery panhandler later convicted of murder and sent to the electric chair.

=== Celebrity residents ===
Name	Portrait	Life	Comments
Grand Duke Alexis		1850–1908	Russian noble who reportedly discovered a destitute Russian countess working as a waitress at Bismark Hall whom he brought back to Russia.
Edwin Forrest		1806–1872	Actor whose performance at the Bowery Theater was interrupted by a riot between Whig and Tammany Hall supporters in July 1834.
Raymond Hitchcock		1865–1929	Vaudevillian and silent film actor who owned the Chinese Theater in Chinatown during the Tong wars.
William Charles Macready		1793–1873	British-born actor who instigated the Astor Place Riot in 1849 when he was chased off the stage of the Astor Opera House by an Irish-American mob.
Richard Mansfield		1857–1907	Actor and honorary member of the Chuck Conners Club.
Nellie Noonan		1874-1905	Actress known as "Queen of the Seventh Ward" and first wife of Chuck Conners.
John L. Stevens		1805–1852	Author of Stevens' Travels, whose description of Egyptian mausoleums would later be used in the construction of The Tombs.

=== Chinatown residents ===
Name	Portrait	Life	Comments
Mike Abrams		d. 1898	Thug for hire known as "Big Mike", he was often hired by Chinatown's underworld figures during feuds between rival Tongs until his mysterious death in 1898.
Ah Hoon		1874-1909	Chinatown actor and comedian who was associated with the On Leong Tong and later killed during the Tong wars.
Ah Ken		fl. 1850–1870	First Cantonese immigrant to settle in Chinatown and founded a successful cigar shop in Park Row.
Bow Kum		1888–1909	Chinese slave girl, also known as "Sweet Flower", whose murder caused a major gang war among the Tongs of New York's Chinatown.
Chin Yin			Artist and calligrapher who helped design the Chinese theater in Chinatown.
Ha Oi		1901–?	Adopted daughter of Mock Duck. In the spring of 1907, the 6-year-old girl was taken away by the state and turned over to the Gerry Society. She was subsequently placed with another family the name "Helen Francis", however, her adoption records are still sealed as of 2016.
Hom Ling			Chinese tragician who performed with comic Ah Hoon at the Chinese Theater.
Mock Duck		1879-1941	Chinatown kingpin and tong leader.
Tai Yu		1878–?	First wife of Mock Duck. In December 1911, she returned to China a month before Mock Dock's arrest.

=== Industrialists ===
Name	Portrait	Life	Comments
Barnet Baff		1863-1914	Celebrity businessman and "poultry king" whose murder was the result of a contract put out on him by business rivals.
Jim Churchill		1863–1930	Owner of Churchill's, a restaurant and cabaret club, located between Broadway and Forty-Eighth Street and considered one of the top cafes in the city up until its close in 1921.
Harris Cohen		1841-1903	Baxter Street business owner whose success and popularity prompted other merchants to start a "franchise" of sorts by using the Cohen name on their respective stores.
David Lamar		1876–1934	An industrialist known as the "Wolf of Wall Street", whose coachmen James McMahon was assaulted by Monk Eastman in Freehold, New Jersey. When McMahon appeared against Lamar in court, he was stabbed and beaten by members of the Eastman Gang as he entered the courthouse and was unable to testify.
Rufus L. Lord		1782–1869	Wall Street business tycoon reportedly worth $4 million whose Exchange Place office was robbed of almost $2 million by the Grady Gang.
Alexander T. Stewart		1803–1876	A pioneer merchant whose body was stolen and later ransomed for $20,000 by George Leonidas Leslie and his gang.

=== Journalists ===
Name	Portrait	Life	Comments
Richard K. Fox		1846–1922	New York publisher and editor of the Police Gazette. He allowed Chuck Conners, a well-known political organizer of Tammany Hall, to stay at his tenement building free of charge in his old age.
Mark Maguire		1814–1889	Sports writer for The Sun popularly known as "King of the Newsboys".
Roy L. McCardell		1870–1940	Journalist and associate of Chuck Conners.
Walt H. McDougall		1858–1938	Cartoonist for the New York Graphic and the New York Herald. Honorary member of the Chuck Conners Club.
Gustavus Myers		1872–1942	Journalist and author.
Frank Ward O'Malley		1875–1932	Journalist for The Sun and associate of Chuck Conners.

=== Reformers ===
Name	Portrait	Life	Comments
Rev. Albert C. Arnold			Founder of the Howard Mission and, with several members of his congregation, stormed John Allen's notorious Fourth Ward dive bar and held a prayer meeting in 1868.
Jacob Brown			Civil servant and city street commissioner who unsuccessfully proposed that the drainage area known as "the Collect" be drained and filled.
Daniel Drew		1797–1879	One-time industrialist who was part of the committee which negotiated the purchase of the Old Brewery district on behalf of the Missionary Society in 1852.
Oliver Dyer		1824–1907	Journalist for Packard's Monthly from which he criticized a number of saloons, clubs and other immoral establishments. Among these were John Allen and was the first to refer to him as "the wickedest man in New York". He was also one of the signatories of the Walter Street "street preaching" document which described attempts by religious leaders to convince saloon keepers and other criminal figures to abandon crime as a way of life.
James W. Gerard		1867–1951	Journalist who studied the London police force and later published a series of articles on police reform among these including the introduction of a permanent uniform. He was also one of the civilian volunteers who joined Police Chief George Washington Matsell in protecting the waterfront from river pirates.
John W. Goff		1865–1924	Judge and later member of the Supreme Court. While a recorder in his early career, he was the first judge to sentence Jack Zelig to prison. A member of the Lexow Committee.
Jonathan H. Green		1813–1887	Reformed gambler and agent for the New York Association for the Suppression of Gambling. In 1850, he conducted an exhaustive report detailing illegal gambling operations active in the city.
Henry Hilton		1824–1899	Attorney for the widow of Alexander T. Stewart. He was involved in the burial and in the initial negotiations with grave robber Henry G. Romaine for the return of Stewart's body.
Archbishop John Hughes		1797–1864	The first Roman Catholic archbishop appointed in New York City, he was one of the many religious leaders who attempted to call for reforms against crime and corruption. He later appealed to mobs during the New York Draft Riots on the final day of the rioting.
Patrick H. Jones		1830–1900	Lawyer and postmaster general who was involved with police Superintendent George Walling in the investigation and later negotiations with the grave robbers who had stolen and held for random the body of Alexander T. Stewart.
William Travers Jerome		1859–1934	District Attorney responsible for the conviction of Abe Hummel in 1905 and ordered raids on a number of illegal gambling resorts forcing many gamblers to leave the city, most notably, Richard Canfield.
Huie Kim		1855-1934	Chinese-born Christian missionary and founder of the Morning Star Mission. He spoke out against criminal figures in Chinatown and publicly condemned the Tong wars.
Jerry McAuley		1839–1884	A reformed gambler and alcoholic, he was the founder of McAuley's Mission which served free meals to the homeless on Water Street. It was originally opened as The Cremourne, the name of the popular dive bar next door, and was often confused by its patrons who often entered his place instead. He was supposed to have locked the front doors and not allow these customers to leave until they had listened to one of his sermons.
Frank Moss		1860–1920	Lawyer who served as council for Rev. Charles Henry Parkhurst and an assistant to District Attorney Charles S. Whitman.
Rev. Charles Henry Parkhurst		1842–1933	Leader of the New York Society for the Prevention of Crime, a civic organization which protested against vice districts and police corruption, and whose campaign eventually revealed the "Tenderloin" police district and resulted in the resignations of Inspector Alexander S. Williams and Captain William S. Devery. The organization also provided evidence of graft and political corruption to the Lexow and Mazet Committee.
Rev. Lewis Morris Pease		1818–1897	First Christian missionary to arrive in the Five Points district at the behest of the Ladies' Home Missionary Society of the Methodist Episcopal Church in 1850. He and his wife set up a room on Cross Street and later started a mission near the Old Brewery district from where they conducted humanitarian efforts including setting up schools for adults and children as well as providing legitimate employment by supervising garment work for local clothing manufacturers.
Rev. T. De Witt Talmage		1832–1902	Longtime street preacher who regularly spoke at the Brooklyn Tabernacle during the 1870s and, with Rev. Henry Ward Beecher, visited vice districts in Manhattan Island where they conducted street sermons in areas which he often referred to as "the modern Gomorrah".
Lewis Tappan		1788–1873	Abolitionist whose home was attacked by a mobs during rioting between Tammany Hall and the Know Nothings in 1834.

=== Saloon keepers ===
Name	Portrait	Life	Comments
John Allen		1830–1870	John Allen's infamous Fourth Ward dance hall operated as a brothel and was a popular underworld hangout during the 1850s and 60s. Known as "the wickedest man in New York", he and other saloon keepers battled reformers such as Oliver Dyer and Rev. A.C. Arnold who wished to rid the city of "immoral" establishments.
Theodore Allen		1833–1908	Born to a prominent Methodist family, Allen was a criminal figure and underworld fence known as "The Dive Keeper" or simply "The Allen", who financed a number of illegal gambling operations and similar establishments. Owner of The American Mabille, a high-class Broadway club, his brother John ran a gambling house while three other brothers were professional burglars.
Burley Bohan		1864–1931	Owner of The Doctor's, a popular hangout for panhandlers and professional beggars popularly known as the "Bowery Bums".
Boiled Oysters Malloy			Bowery thief and saloon keeper who ran a popular Centre Street basement bar known as The Ruins. Malloy was also a criminal associate of Patsy Conroy and his gang.
Tom Bray			Owner of a Thompson Street dive bar from which he operated as a criminal fence for thieves and confidence men for over forty years, Bray was reputed to be worth between $200,000 and $350,000 at the time of his death.
Johnny Camphine			Camphine ran one of the most infamous dive bars in the city, often serving colored camphine or rectified turpentine oil in place of whiskey, and was said to have caused insanity and delirium tremens of least 100 patrons.
Ed Coffee			A well-known sportsman, Coffee was the owner of the high-class Sixth Avenue Star and Garter. The bar was one of the most popular nightspots when it originally opened in 1878 and featured Billy Patterson as its head bartender.
Dan The Dude		fl. 1900–1910	Saloon keeper, political "fixer" and underworld figure involved in illegal gambling.
Shang Draper		1839–1883	Saloon keeper and underworld figure sometimes associated with George Leonidas Leslie and his gang.
Barney Flynn			Chatham Square saloon keeper whose Doyers Street saloon, located across the street from the famed Callahan's Dance Hall, was a popular drinking establishment among Irish-Americans during the turn of the 20th century.
Owney Geogheghan		1840–1885	Owner of a Bowery dive bar, located next to the high-class Winsor Palace, and was the scene of violence and muggings by "lush workers", blackjack artists and pickpockets.
Kate Flannery			A female bouncer who worked for "One-Armed" Charley Monell's Hole-in-the-Wall saloon along with Gallus Mag.
Harry Hill		1827–1896	British-born sportsman and gambler whose West Houston Street gambling resort remained one of the most popular places in the city for over three decades until its close in 1886.
Jimmy Kelly			Owner of a Bowery dive bar and was a criminal associate of the Eastman Gang.
Jimmy Lee			Owner of The Dump with Slim Reynolds, a popular Bowery hangout for panhanders, confidence men and other members of the underworld.
Gallus Mag		fl. 1850–1870	English-born street mugger and thief. She worked as a female bouncer for "One-Armed" Charley Monell in his Hole-in-the-Wall saloon with Kate Flannery. She is said to have kept a collection of human ears, bitten off during fights with unruly customers and waterfront criminals, which she displayed in pickled jars on the saloon's bar.
Billy McGlory		1853–1927	Five Points saloon keeper and owner of a number of popular establishments throughout the city. A criminal associate of the Forty Thieves and the Chichesters in his youth, McGlory's Armory Hall on Hester Street remained a popular Bowery hangout for members of the underworld in the Fourth and Sixth Wards during the 1870s and 80s.
Mallet Murphy			A popular Bowery saloon keeper, his nickname was attributed to his use of a wooden mallet as a weapon against unruly customers and to defend his bar against criminals. His Battle Row saloon was used as the headquarters of the Gopher Gang during the turn of the 20th century.
Mersher Miller			Saloon keeper known as "Mersher The Strong Arm", who owned a Norfolk Street beer house at the turn of the 20th century. His bar was later the scene of a gunbattle when Johnny Spanish attempted to rob the bar and the patrons.
Peter Mitchell			Owner of a saloon at Wooster and Prince Streets, he quickly amassed a small fortune of $350,000 within two years. Finding religion in his later years, he eventually committed suicide by hanging himself to a whiskey tap out of guilt for the way he had acquired his wealth.
Charley Monell			Known as "One Armed Charlie", Monell was the longtime owner of the Dover Street saloon the Hole-in-the-Wall where Kate Flannery and Gallus Mag were employed as bouncers.
Billy Patterson			A popular bartender widely regarded as the "finest drink mixer in the city", Patterson's mysterious assault while working at the Star and Garter gave rise to an early urban legend and inspired the phrase "Who struck Billy Patterson?" which became a common phrase used to describe an unsolved crime.
Jack Pioggi			Owner of a Doyers Street drinking den, near Chinatown's infamous Bloody Angle, and was later a business associate of Chick Tricker. He was also the older brother of Louis "Louie the Lump" Poggi.
Slim Reynolds			He and fellow saloon keeper Jimmy Lee ran a popular Bowery hangout and meeting place for members of the underworld, particularly panhandlers, known as The Dump.
Mush Riley		fl. 1870–1878	Acquiring his particular nickname for his fondness of corn meal mush dipped in hot brandy, Riley was the owner of a Center Street dive bar and criminal associate of many underworld figures.
Mike Salter		1868–1922	Owner of a popular Pell Street resort, the Pelham, Irving Berlin worked there as a singing waiter prior to becoming a professional ragtime musician and later performed at the club during his early career.
Frank Stephenson			Bowery saloon keeper and owner of the Bleecker Street basement bar The Black and Tan. One of the first saloons to cater to African Americans, it competed directly against neighboring establishments such as Harry Hill's gambling resort and Billy McGlory's Armory Hall among others.

=== Sportsmen ===
Name	Portrait	Life	Comments
Jim Corbett		1866–1933	Heavyweight boxing champion during the 1890s, he defeated John L. Sullivan for the title and held it for over five years. Following his retirement, Corbett settled in Bayside, Queens and became a regular performer in minstrel shows and silent films. He was one of many sportsmen involved in the Chuck Conners Association.
Bob Fitzsimmons		1863–1917	British-born boxer who defeated Jim Corbett for the heavyweight boxing championship in 1897. He was a member of the Chuck Conners Association.
Tom Heenan		1833–1873	Bare-knuckle boxer known as "Benicia Boy", who defeated Tom Hyer for heavyweight boxing championship in 1853. He eventually lost the title to John Morrissey.
Joe Humphreys		1872–1936	Boxing official and announcer who co-owned the Chinese Theater with actor Raymond Hitchcock during the Tong wars.
Tom Hyer		1819–1864	Pugilist and bare-knuckle boxer recognized as the American heavyweight boxing champion after defeating Country McCleester in one of the city's most memorable bouts.
Jim Jefferies		1875–1953	Pugilist who defeated Bob Fitzsimmons for the Heavyweight boxing championship and defended from 1899 until his retirement in 1905. He was also associated with the Young Chuck Conners Association.
John L. Sullivan		1858–1918	Pugilist and bare-knuckle boxer who dominated the sport during the late 19th century.
Steve Taylor		1851–1895?	Pugilist and bare-knuckle boxer who fought and lost to John L. Sullivan in his first New York appearance. Later became a New York politician under Boss Tweed.
Yankee Sullivan		1811–1856	One of the top bare-knuckle boxers during the 1840s, he was also an ally of John Morrissey against the nativist Know-Nothing movement.
