= Hole-in-the-Wall (saloon) =

Former saloon in New York City

Coordinates: 40.708°N 74.000°W

- Interactive map of Hole-in-the-Wall
- Address: On the corner of Water and Dover Street
- Location: Manhattan, New York, United States
- Owner: Charley Monell
- Type: Dive bar

Construction
- Opened: 1850s
- Closed: c. 1855

The Hole-in-the-Wall was a popular saloon and underworld hangout in what is now the South Street Seaport, Manhattan, New York City during the early- to mid-19th century. It has been described as the "most notorious" saloon in New York city during the 19th century. It was one of many dive bars and similar establishments in New York's infamous Fourth Ward, located at the corner of Water and Dover Streets. The saloon was owned by "One Armed" Charley Monell and featured notorious female criminals Kate Flannery and Gallus Mag as bouncers. Both women were employed by Monell as lieutenants in his local criminal organization, which included shanghaiing, and the latter woman supposedly kept a collection of human ears which she had bitten off from unruly customers in bar brawls. She displayed these as trophies on the bar in pickle jars. Sadie the Goat, the later leader of the Charlton Street Gang, was of the many victims who lost her ear in a brawl with Gallus Mag.

The bar was widely known as "the most vicious resort in the city", with seven murders having occurred in a two-month period, and it was at the saloon in 1855 that a bar room brawl between waterfront thugs Slobbery Jim and Patsy the Barber, both members of the Daybreak Boys, resulted in Patsy's death. Slobbery Jim was forced to flee the city soon after. The Hole-in-the-Wall was finally closed down by Captain Thomas Woolsey Thorne. According to Richard McDermott, founder of the quarterly New York Chronicle, the Hole-in-the-Wall may have occupied the present-day site of one of New York's oldest surviving saloons, the Bridge Cafe.
