= Mahaney =

Mahaney is a surname. Notable people with the surname include:

- Aidan Mahaney (born 2003), American college basketball player
- C. J. Mahaney (born 1953), American religious leader
- Hilary Mahaney (1902–1969), American football player and coach
- Jack Mahaney (1844–?), American criminal
- Kevin Mahaney (born 1962) American real estate developer and sailor
