= McBreen =

McBreen is a surname. Notable people with the surname include:

- Chris McBreen (born 1972), New Zealand snooker player
- Daniel McBreen (born 1977), Australian footballer and coach
- Martin McBreen (died 1911), American saloonkeeper and criminal
- Tom McBreen (born 1952), American swimmer
