= Spanish Louie =

American criminal and member of the Humpty Jackson Gang

- Born: John Lewis; New York City, New York, United States
- Died: April 1, 1910; Manhattan, New York
- Cause of death: Murdered
- Other names: Spanish Louis; Indian Louis
- Occupation: Criminal
- Known for: New York gunman and member of the Humpty Jackson Gang

John Lewis (died April 1, 1910), better known by his alias Indian or Spanish Louie (Lewis), was an American criminal and member of the Humpty Jackson Gang, serving as the gang leader's longtime lieutenant from around the turn of the 20th century until his murder in either 1900 or 1910. His death was the first recorded use of a drive by shooting as a means of gangland execution in New York City.

== Early years in the New York underworld ==
John Lewis was born in New York City, although his background remained a mystery to both the underworld and authorities for much of his life. Lewis did not have a criminal record with the New York City Police Department and was one of the few underworld figures to have avoided being "booked" by the famed Central Office despite being investigated for an unsolved homicide. It was the Mulberry Police Precinct that investigated this claim, at the time mostly based on rumor but one which he had admitted to, yet was cleared after finding no evidence to substantiate these claims.

He first became known as an up-and-coming thug for hire from the Lower East Side and began frequenting "Big" Jack Zelig's club in Chatham Square around 1900. Lewis was also a regular at Barney Flynn's and Mike Salter's establishments as well as the Chatham Club. He was nicknamed Spanish Louie by friends and associates to distinguish him from the many other East Side gangsters who shared that name. He was also called Indian Louie which was attributed to his "dark skin, black eyes, thin lips, high cheek-bones and high curved nose". This, along with his penchant for wearing a black sombrero and similarly styled clothing, started the rumor that he had come from South America and was "of Spanish or Portuguese extraction". It was also said that he had served in the military but these rumors "failed to name the regiment or the ship".

Lewis never confirmed or denied the rumors although he occasionally made vague comments mentioning "his noble Spanish and Portuguese forefathers, and also let it be known that the hot blood of Indian chieftains flowed in his veins, and that he had inherited all the vices and none of the virtue of the red man". Tall tales of his supposed "feats" were often told in dive bars throughout Chinatown and The Bowery, and the New York Times once described him as "big bodied and muscular and could deliver more knockouts with his right than any man his size or double it for that matter", but there was always a certain degree of suspicion from his underworld contemporaries. He was never short on money, supposedly having "no fewer than three girls walking the streets for him", but was rarely known to engage in violent crime and his lack of a police record caused some to wonder if his personality was all an act. Sardinia Frank, a Mulberry Bend thug who killed celebrated bouncer "Eat-'em-Up" Jack McManus in 1905, said following his death that "he was a bluff; he wasn't th' goods. He went around wit' his hat over his eyes, bulldozin' everybody he could, an' lettin' on to be a hero. An' he's got what heroes get."

Lewis was sometimes referred to as "the best shot on the East Side" or "the deadest of dead shots", and he was often seen wearing a brace of Colt revolvers, although there is no record of his ever having used them. There is only one incident in which Lewis displayed his skill when he led a robbery of Valenski's stuss house on Third Avenue near Fourteenth Street. Lewis single-handedly held the customers at bay while his accomplices looted the safe stealing $380 in all. The money was returned two days later, Lewis claiming the robbery was a practical joke, but many thought Lewis had been forced to give back the money by "one high in politics and power" and his reputation suffered because of this belief.

== Murder of Crazy Charlie ==
Soon afterwards, a "Bowery Bum" known as Crazy Charlie was found dead in the mouth of a passageway off Mulberry Street near the Bowery. Charlie had been brutally murdered, his throat having been slashed, and it was claimed by a police informer known as "the Ghost" that Lewis was responsible. This was highly doubted in the underworld, Lewis well known for being a mercenary, and would have had no motive to kill a penniless drug addict. Nevertheless, Lewis was picked up by two plainclothes detectives from the Eldridge Police Precinct. Lewis was never told why he was arrested and neither was he officially booked, given their evidence relied mainly on hearsay, investigators wanted to gather more evidence before pressing charges.

His revolvers and a seven-inch knife, found inside his waistcoat, were confiscated when he was brought in. The desk sergeant remarked that the gangster's knife could have been the possible murder weapon although it was later found that the knife had not been recently used. The detectives hoped to get a confession out of Lewis and, having yet to inform him as to why he had been arrested, they put him in the back of a paddy wagon and drove him to the city morgue. Once there, they took Lewis inside and showed him the mutilated body of Crazy Charlie hoping to frighten a confession from him. Yet Lewis "neither startled nor exclaimed" and instead took out a cigarette and turned to one of the detectives for a match. When one of the detectives pointed out the body and asked "Do you see this?", Lewis replied "Yes. Also, I'll tell you bulls another thing. You think to rattle me. Say, for ten cents I'd sit on this stiff all night an' smoke a pipe." Seeing their attempt to bluff Lewis had failed, the detectives let him go.

In November 1909 a pickpocket named Jacob Lavine was drinking with a woman known to be "Spanish Louie's"; Louie wounded Lavine; when Lavine refused to appear against Louie, Louie was fined $10.00 {or $25.00} for carrying a concealed weapon December 30, 1909.

== Death ==
Less than a year on the Lower East Side, Lewis's bullet-riddled body was found in Twelfth Street near Second Avenue. He was found with $170 in his pocket, $700 in his shoe and had about $3,000 deposited in the Bowery Savings Bank. The murder was never solved and it was also revealed at his funeral, held as an orthodox Jewish burial by his father, that Lewis was in actuality from a Sephardic Jewish family in Brooklyn.

Although killed in an underworld dispute, there seems to be some confusion as to the date and circumstances of his death. One account claims he was killed in 1900 by The Grabber, a fellow lieutenant of Humpty Jackson, after Lewis withheld his share from the proceeds of a Tammany Hall fundraiser they had co-hosted. According to a second version, Lewis was shot to death in a drive-by shooting by the Lenox Avenue Gang, on the orders of Jack Zelig, on the night of April 1, 1910. Lewis had been hired by Herman Rosenthal in 1909 to beat up one of his rivals, Bridgie Webber. Lewis was later targeted to be killed because of his association with Rosenthal and, after being lured to his East Eleventh Street apartment late one evening, several men in a passing Pierce Arrow called out to him as he stood on the doorstep. The men opened fire and Lewis was killed as he ran towards a side street.

== In popular culture ==
Lewis has appeared in several historical novels including Before My Life Began (1985) by Jay Neugeboren, Dreamland (1999) by Kevin Baker and Cityside (2003) by William Heffernan.
