= Peter Sawyer =

Peter Sawyer may refer to:

- Peter Sawyer (criminal)
- Peter Sawyer (historian)
