= Busteed =

Busteed is a surname. Notable people with the name include:

- Kimberley Busteed (born 1986), Australian beauty pageant winner
- Richard Busteed (1822–1898), Irish-born American civil war general and attorney
- William Busteed (1848–unknown), American gambler and underworld figure in New York City
- Steven Busteed (born 1948), emeritus Mayor and Freeman of Port Stephens. Councillor Port Stephens Council 1987–2003, NSW. Former City Architect Newcastle City NSW (1987–1998), Retired Flight Lieutenant, 26 SQN, RAAF Reserve.
