= The Dump (saloon) =

Former dive bar in New York City

Coordinates: 40.71442°N 73.99681°W

- Interactive map of The Dump
- Address: No. 9 Bowery
- Location: Manhattan, New York, United States
- Owner: Jimmy Lee and Slim Reynolds
- Type: Dive bar

Construction
- Opened: 1890s
- Closed: c.1910

The Dump was a popular saloon and dive bar in New York City from the 1890s to about 1910. Owned by Jimmy Lee and Slim Reynolds, it was one of several establishments frequented by the underworld, most especially the Bowery Bums. It has been claimed that Tom Lee, head of the On Leong Tong, also ran the establishment at one time.

Goat Hinch and Whitey Sullivan, who were executed in 1903 for the murder of Matthew Wilson during a bank robbery, were among its regular customers. It has been claimed that Hinch perfected a method of panhandling by "swallowing a concoction which would make him temporarily ill and arouse the sympathies of people in the street". The Dump was also one of the regular haunts of Chuck Connors, a longtime Tammany Hall political organizer in Chinatown.

Like other dive bars, such as Patrick "Burly" Bohan's The Doctor's, The Dump provided sleeping quarters, or "velvet rooms", for its customers. But while Bohan's place and others usually provided cots, Lee and Reynolds made different arrangements, as described by Herbert Asbury in The Gangs of New York (1928), by screwing "short iron stanchions into the floor about seven feet from the rear wall, and into the wall affixed an iron framework. From the latter to the stanchions was a net of coarse rope, and when a bum passed out from dope or the effects of whiskey and camphor, he was simply tossed into the net to sleep it off".

Frequent police raids and the general improvement of economic conditions prior to World War I caused The Dump and many other longtime low Bowery dive bars, as well as the Bowery Bums themselves, to gradually disappear by the turn of the 20th century.

== In popular culture ==
The Dump is referenced in the historical novel Dreamland (1999) by Kevin Baker.
