= Johnny Camphine =

- Other name: Johnny Camphene
- Occupation: Saloon keeper
- Known for: New York saloon keeper and underworld figure during the mid-to late 19th century.

Johnny Camphine or Camphene (fl. 1860 – 1890) was the pseudonym of an American saloon keeper and underworld figure in New York City during the mid-to late 19th century. He was reputed to have run "one of the most notorious dives in the city", located at Mercer and Houston Streets. His name came from his serving colored camphine or rectified turpentine oil in place of whiskey; the latter was in use during the 19th century as a solvent for varnishes and as a fuel for lamps. On average, "two men a night were taken out of the place" after drinking Camphine's beverages and caused known cases of insanity and delirium tremens at least 100 patrons over a long-term period.
