= John Coughlin (police officer) =

John D. Coughlin
- Born: July 2, 1874
- Died: September 30, 1951 (aged 77); Manhattan, New York
- Occupations: Police officer, private detective
- Known for: Head of the NYPD detectives division from 1920-1928; chief investigator of the unsolved murder of Arnold Rothstein; later chief investigator for the Johns-Manville Corporation.
- Relatives: William Poling, nephew

John D. Coughlin (July 2, 1874 – September 30, 1951) was an American law enforcement officer, detective and police inspector in the New York City Police Department. He served as head of the NYPD detectives division from 1920 until 1928 when he was removed from office amid charges of police laxity following the murder of underworld figure Arnold Rothstein.

== Biography ==
John Coughlin was born on July 2, 1874. In September 1896, while Theodore Roosevelt was still head of the Board of Police Commissioners, he joined the New York City Police Department as a patrolman. He spent 11 years in the Tenderloin district, where he earned a reputation as a courageous and highly skilled officer, before being made acting captain and took change of the combined detective commands in Brooklyn and Queens. He was eventually responsible for the capture of the bank robber Frank Hamby who was later convicted and sent to the electric chair.

On December 30, 1909, while stationed in Chinatown, then Sergeant Coughlin and two patrolman were ordered to keep Chinese comedian Ah Hoon under protective custody. Ah Hoon, a member of the On Leong Tong, had been threatened by the rival Hip Sings and Four Brothers for his refusal to ridicule the tong's during his performances. Coughlin and the other two officers accompanied Ah Hoon to the Chinese Theater where they sat on stage throughout Ah Hoon's act and then escorted the comedian through an underground passageway back to his home in Chatham Square. Despite their precautions, Ah Hoon was found dead in his room the following morning becoming the first victim to fall during the Tong wars.

The early years of Prohibition brought a number of problems for law enforcement agencies throughout the country, these issues first becoming evident in the NYPD, and which would affect Coughlin's tenure upon his appointment as head of the NYPD detectives division by Police Commissioner Richard Edward Enright in September 1920. It was hoped that his appointment would restore the public's confidence after the failure of the police to solve a string of high-profile murders, most notably, the unsolved murder of New York playboy Joseph B. Elwell.

When Arnold Rothstein was shot and killed in the Park Central Hotel on November 4, 1928, Coughlin and his detectives were unable to find any suspects in the Broadway area who might have had a motive to kill Rothstein. The investigation stalled and charges of police laxity and indifference were made by the press. The implications, then compared to the police complicity in the 1912 murder of Herman Rosenthal, created such a scandal that then Police Commissioner Joseph Warren, a former law partner of Mayor James J. Walker, resigned due to ill health.

His successor, Grover A. Whalen, immediately began investigations accusing a number of senior police officials of police inaction in regards to the Rothstein murder. Half a dozen officers would become victims of Whalen's actions. Coughlin and Chief Inspector William J. Lahey, then head of the uniformed force, were both removed from their commands on December 19 and eventually forced into retirement. Coughlin publicly defended his conduct during the murder investigation and pointed out that Commissioner Whalen was never able make any more progress than he did, with the case remaining unsolved.

Coughlin was later hired as chief investigator for the Johns-Manville Corporation and held the post until 1949. He died at his Lexington Avenue home after a long illness on the morning of September 30, 1951, survived by his nephew and only living relative William Poling.
