= Ludwig the Bloodsucker =

Bowery character and possible urban legend

- Known for: Bowery character and possible urban legend described as "America's first vampire".

Ludwig the Bloodsucker was an American mythical figure and possible urban legend in New York City during the mid-to late 19th century. A longtime Bowery character, he was described as having vampire-like qualities. He was a "squat, swarthy German, with an enormous head crowned with a shock of bristly black hair. Huge bunches of hair grew out of his ears, and his unusual appearance was accentuated by another tuft which sprouted by the end of his nose" and supposedly had "hair growing out of every orifice". Ludwig was said to have preyed upon drunken customers of barroom brawls near Bismark Hall and the House of Commons and is claimed to have "quaffed human blood as if it were wine".
