= Hell-Cat Maggie =

19th-century American gang member

- Born: c. 1820
- Died: 1845 (aged c. 25)
- Other name: Hellcat Maggie
- Occupation: Street gang member
- Known for: Five Points personality and early member of the Dead Rabbits

Hell-Cat Maggie (fl. 1820–1845) was the pseudonym of an American outlaw and early member of the Dead Rabbits. She was a well-known personality in Manhattan's Five Points district and a noted fighter, her teeth reportedly filed into points and her fingers adorned with long, claw-like brass fingernails. She fought alongside the Dead Rabbits and other Five Pointers against rival nativist gangs from the Bowery, most especially the Bowery Boys, during the early 1840s. Although there is little information about her life, she is one of the earliest female outlaws of the "Gangs of New York" era and has been compared to other female outlaws such as Gallus Mag and Battle Annie, the latter leading the female auxiliary of the Gopher Gang during the 1870s.

A composite character based on Hell-Cat Maggie, Sadie the Goat (whose factual existence has been doubted) and Gallus Mag was played by Cara Seymour in the 2002 film adaptation of Herbert Asbury's The Gangs of New York directed by Martin Scorsese. She was also featured in the 2003 historical novel A Passionate Girl by Thomas J. Fleming, and season 2 of Our Flag Means Death.
