= Patrick Bohan =

American saloonkeeper

Burly Bohan
- Born: 1864; Mohill, Ireland
- Died: 1931 (aged 66–67); New York City, New York, U.S.
- Resting place: Calvary Cemetery
- Occupation: Saloonkeeper
- Known for: New York saloonkeeper and owner of the popular Park Row dive bar The Doctor's
- Spouse(s): Rose Gallagher, Nora Donahue
- Children: 1

Patrick "Burly" Bohan (1864– January 8, 1931) was an American saloonkeeper and owner of The Doctor's, a popular dive bar at 95 Park Row, Manhattan and hangout for panhandlers and professional beggars known as the 'Bowery Bums'. Many of his patrons "preyed upon the public by simulating cripples." Bohan, according to crime historian Herbert Asbury, provided a locker for storing crutches and canes while these panhandlers spent their money on whiskey, rum and liquified camphor.

The establishment also served as a hotel where, against the rear wall of the building, two long tables and the space underneath were rented for a nickel. Among its most famous residents were Tom Frizzell, known as "King of the Panhandlers", and Jack Dempsey. Bohan himself is described as living somewhat extravagantly wearing "flashing diamonds on his shirt bosom".

On the morning of July 25, 1904, an argument between Bohan and his bartender Jerry O'Connor resulted in a vicious barfight involving at least eleven other customers. The incident began when the two began arguing over O'Connor's wages for the week and, becoming more heated, O'Connor pulled out a revolver and shot Bohan twice. One shot hit Bohan in the right side of the head and a second one to the left hand. The bar was filled with customers at the time, all of whom were friends of Bohan, and they immediately set upon O'Connor. They all "helped in treating O'Connor about as badly as they could" as the bartender was "hustled from one place to the other, and punched and kicked". By the time the police arrived, O'Connor had been beaten unconscious and most likely had a fractured skull.

The shots had been heard by detectives McDonnell and Maher of the Oak Street Precinct and ran to the hotel where they had to force their way inside with drawn revolvers. After breaking up the fight, they had a patrolman call for an ambulance to take both men away. One eventually arrived from the Hudson Street Hospital. Both Bohan and O'Connor were charged by police, O'Connor for felonious assault and Bohan for misdemeanor assault, while all involved were arrested as "suspicious persons" and held as witnesses. One man, local printer Frank Murphy, was charged with disorderly conduct.

Bohan died at his home on January 8, 1931.
