= Samuel Weiss (mobster) =

Samuel "Sammy" Weiss (c. 1904 – ?) was an American mobster in New York and an associate of labor racketeer Jacob "Little Augie" Orgen. Employed as a gunman for Orgen and the "Little Augies", he took part in the gang war against Nathan Kaplan during the early 1920s. On the afternoon of August 28, 1923, several men were spotted by police shortly before Kaplan was to leave the Essex Market Courthouse (he would be killed later that day by Orgen gunman Louis Cohen). Although the men scattered as police officers approached, Weiss, Orgen and Samuel Gepson were arrested near the courthouse. Finding all three men to be carrying revolvers, the three were arrested and charged with violation of the Sullivan Law and arraigned at Essex Market Courthouse the following day.

While in custody, Weiss and Orgen were questioned by acting District Attorney Ferdinand Pecora and, while unable to gain a confession from either man, he publicly stated that he believed Kaplan's murder had been the result of an underworld feud between the two men. He and Orgen would be tried along with Cohen as accessories to Kaplan's murder, however only Cohen would be convicted while Weiss and Orgen were released.

In May 1937, as a result of an investigation by Districy Attorney Thomas E. Dewey into racketeering in the garment indstury, he and David Goldberg were convicted of filing false state income and franchise tax returns for Donnie Frock, Inc for the purposed of concealing $8,000 in unreported income. Although sentenced to an indeterminate sentence, a writ of reasonable doubt was signed by Supreme Court Justice Salvatore A. Cotillo on January 3, 1938, which allowed the release of both men in exchange for a bail of $2,500 each.
