= Tom Flaherty =

American criminal, thief and river pirate

- Other name: Old Flaherty
- Occupation: Criminal
- Known for: River pirate and patriarch of a criminal family in New York's Seventh Ward.
- Children: 2 sons

Tom Flaherty, more commonly known under his pseudonym Old Flaherty, (born c. 1824) was an American criminal, sneak thief and river pirate in New York City during the mid-to late 19th century. He was the patriarch of a criminal family in New York's Seventh Ward which terrorized the New York waterfront in the post-American Civil War era. Flaherty was described as having "long white whiskers and a benevolent smile, but he was one of the most cruel thugs of the Seventh Ward".

Flaherty was considered a powerful underworld figure in his day, one of his criminal associates being Bum Mahoney of the Patsy Conroy and Hook Gangs, while he and another young river pirate, James Smith, stole boats from the waterfront and sail to South Brooklyn. From there, they would sail upriver raiding "farm houses, hen-roosts, canal boats, or anything else that came in their way". He and Smith were eventually arrested by Brooklyn Police and sentenced to five years on Blackwell's Island around 1874. His wife, herself a well-known shoplifter and pickpocket, followed him soon after. Their youngest son was sentenced to 15 years in Sing Sing for garroting and highway robbery while the oldest, leaving New York for the frontier, was sentenced to ten years in Illinois State Prison for burglary.
