= Nicholas Saul =

19th-century American criminal

- Born: c. 1833
- Died: January 28, 1853 (19-20); Tombs Prison, New York, New York, U.S.
- Status: Deceased
- Conviction: Murder
- Penalty: Death by hanging

Nicholas Saul (c. 1833 – January 28, 1853) was a nineteenth-century criminal and one of the founding members of the Daybreak Boys, a New York City street gang. Saul led many of the gang's early raids, many of which were before sunrise— earning the gang their nickname—on the Hudson River and East River waterfront. At its height during 1851 to 1853, the gang earned an estimated $200,000 under Saul's leadership.

== See also ==
- Capital punishment in New York (state)
- Capital punishment in the United States
- List of people executed in New York
