= Syksey =

- Occupation: Criminal
- Known for: Member of the Bowery Boys and lieutenant to Mose the Fireboy.
- Political party: Know Nothings

Syksey (fl. 1840–1849) was the pseudonym of an American criminal and member of the Bowery Boys. He was supposedly the lieutenant and longtime companion to Mose the Fireboy during the 1840s, often the storyteller of his feats, and is credited for coining the phrase "hold 'de but", a common expression used during the mid-to late 19th century meaning to borrow a dead cigar or to "bum a smoke". He was later portrayed in Benjamin Baker's play Mose, the Bowery B'hoy which performed at the old Olympic Theater in 1849 and later toured throughout the United States during the late 1840s and 50s. His pseudonym may have been derived from Bill Sikes, the sidekick of gang leader Fagin from Oliver Twist.
