= Ephraim Snow =

- Other names: Old Snow
- Occupation: Fence
- Known for: Early criminal fence and underworld figure in New York during the early-to mid 19th century; principal rival of Joe Erich during the 1850s and 60s.

Ephraim Snow or Old Snow (fl. 1850–1865) was an American criminal fence and underworld figure on New York City during the early-to mid-19th century. He was one of the first major fences in New York and the main competitor of Joe Erich during the 1850s and 60s, however the two had a far more friendly and cooperative relationship then the fierce rivalries of later fences such as John D. "Traveling Mike" Grady and Fredericka "Marm" Mandelbaum. He operated from a small dry goods store on the corner of Grand and Allen Streets, only a short distance from Erich's establishment in Maiden Lane, and was well known as a dealer in "stolen property of every description". According to underworld lore, Erich once disposed of a flock of sheep that some Bowery thugs brought back with them while on vacation in Upstate New York having stolen them from a farm in Westchester County and herded them "through the streets of the city to the shop of the fence".

He and Erich were eventually overshadowed of the rise of John Grady and Marm Mandelbaum in the post-American Civil War era, both earning millions though financing criminal gangs in addition to dealing in stolen goods, and Snow worked with Mandelbaum in her early criminal career. Snow was eventually arrested and sentenced to five years imprisonment.
