= Pat Hearne =

Gambler and casino owner

- Born: Waterford, Ireland
- Died: July 4, 1859; Manhattan, New York, United States
- Resting place: Greenwood Cemetery
- Known for: New York gambler, sportsman and underworld figure during the mid-19th century; opened the first casinos in the city during the 1830s
- Children: 2 adoptive daughters

Patrick L. Hearne, also spelled Hern, Hearn or Herne, (died July 4, 1859) was an American gambler, sportsman and underworld figure in New York City during the mid-19th century. He was the first man, along with fellow gambler Henry Colton, to open "first-class" casinos in the city during the 1830s. His self-named resort in lower Broadway was especially popular in the years prior to the American Civil War and regarded in the city as "perhaps the most famous gambler of the era".

== Biography ==
=== Early life and arrival in America ===
Born in Waterford, Ireland, Patrick Hearne belonged to a family who "held a most high and respectable position" in the local county and whose his father was a respected solicitor. One of his sisters married a Colonel Williams, a highly distinguished British officer who served in the Crimean War, while another became a nun in a Roman Catholic convent. He and two of his brothers eventually emigrated to United States where one, a judge, served as a prominent member of the New York bar.

After graduating with a Bachelor of Arts from Trinity College Dublin, Hearne left Ireland for Canada where there were then plenty of positions open to young men hoping to practice law. Hearne was unable to find work, however, and moved to New York City where he eventually "found himself penniless at the old City Hotel". On his first day in the city, while walking down Broadway, he ran into an old friend from Dublin. His friend advised him to go to New Orleans, where large groups of Irish immigrants were settling, and loaned him some money to get him as far as Baltimore. Once there, he left his trunk behind and proceeded on foot to the nearest reachable point on the Mississippi River. He walked a distance of several hundred miles and, coming across the first riverboat, he was able to convince its captain that while he could not pay for passage he would pay him his fee once he was able to find employment. The captain, "struck by his good address and pleading presence", agreed to his request.

=== Time in New Orleans ===
Once in New Orleans, Hearne was immediately hired by one of the top law firms in the city. His university training served him well and, after a brief probationary period, he was hired as a full-time member with a salary fixed at $1,800 a year. He remained employed there until the head of the firm, becoming infirm in his old age, took on a partner who subsequently had Hearne released. Finding himself penniless once again, he was soon approached by a young gambler whom he had met on the riverboat to New Orleans. The young man, whose father was a silent partner at a major gambling house, offered Hearne an accounting position at what was then the largest gambling operation in the city.

While working for the casino, he became a favorite to many of its wealthy patrons who "having received a good education, and being a man of polished manners, with a social and genial disposition, and having, withal, a large stock of rollickling Irish humor, he commended himself to all with whom he came in contact, and those fond of play and fast living found in Pat Herne a congenial companion". He was able to get several to invest in a bank on his own account in Louisville, Kentucky.

=== Return to New York ===
Hearne remained with the gambling-house until public gaming was outlawed. The crackdown on illegal gambling by city officials in New Orleans beginning in 1835 resulted in a mass exodus to other cities around the country. New York City was among the places where gambling emerged and, within a few years, succeeded New Orleans as the country's gaming capitol. It was Pat Hearne, along with Henry Colton, who opened the city's earliest "first-class" casinos during this period. Their success encouraged more gamblers to flock to New York over the next decade allowing the development of future gambling and vice districts.

In 1840, Hearne "fitted up" and opened a suite of apartments on Barclay Street which became the city's first skinning house". He used the apartments to entertain patrons with "bird" style dinners who were then "braced" to pay the expense. The most successful of Hearne's ventures, however, was his self-named gambling resort, opposite the Metropolitan Hotel, in lower Broadway; according to rumor he made as much as $15,000 or $20,000 a night. His gambling operations were compared to those of John Morrissey in Saratoga in later years. He became "a very celebrated character in New York" during the 1840s and 50s, being among the sportsmen and gambling empresarios who "rubbed elbows" with many celebrities, literary figures and politicians of the day, and was one of the first prominent sportsmen to emerge in the city including Isaiah Rynders, prizefighters Yankee Sullivan and Tom Hyer, and minstrel Dan Bryant.

There was not a car-driver, nor a hack-driver, nor an omnibus-driver, nor any pedestrian that frequented Broadway who was not familiar with the face and figure of Pat Hearn. He was celebrated not only on account of keeping the swell gambling house of New York, but he was also known from his peculiarity of costume. Hat on one side, necktie of satin, scarf-pin of the most flaming description, gloves of the brightest lemon-colored kid, and all that sort of thing.

— Memories of Fifty Years (1889)

Pat Hearne, according to one article by the New York Tribune, won "not less than half a million dollars" at his Broadway casino, but he "loved to play for its own sake"; He was so much of a gambler, in fact, that he lost his house's take more than once, and eventually the gambling-house itself. Eventually, New York too began to go after certain gambling operations as well. A number of gamblers, such as faro dealers, had their establishments seized by authorities and tried by police magistrates at the Court of General Sessions. None of the cases ever went to a conviction with the single exception of a complaint against Pat Hearne.

In early 1855, Hearne was apprehended and taken to the Eighth Ward Station-House, where he was detained for the night. Earlier that year, theologian Henry James, Sr. had found his brother John was deeply in debt to Hearne, whom he called the "barracuda of New York gamblers", and who owed Hearne approximately $2,124 at the time of his death. James began writing a series anti-gambling columns for the New York Tribune in which he referred to Hearne and other gamblers as "social vermin". James was also upset that Hearne's gambling resort was located next door to John Jacob Astor's old mansion at 685 Broadway. James, whose father had been a close friend of Astor, asked readers what Astor would have thought if he knew that a "social pest house sat next to his honest mansion". Hearne, at one point, actually purchased the mansion before it was sold to the Buckleys who converted it into their opera house. Then recently elected Mayor of New York Fernando Wood showed little interest in reform or cleaning up the vice districts and Hearne continued to run his establishment. Henry James left New York that same year. His biographer Alfred Habegger believed this may have been due to threats of retaliation from the New York underworld.

Hearne was eventually arrested in another gambling raid the following year and, this time, gained his release only after promising to close his gambling resort for good. His release was arraigned by his lawyer Daniel Sickles.

=== Death ===
After the close of his Broadway resort, Hearne retired from gambling and quietly lived with his wife and two adopted daughters at No. 6 Clinton Place. On the morning of July 4, 1859, Hearne died at his home after a long illness. Only ten days before, he had suffered a mild attack of "paralysis of the brain" but his health rallied and was expected to recover until his second fatal attack. He was buried in a private ceremony at Greenwood Cemetery the next day.
