= Joe Erich =

- Occupation: Fence
- Known for: Early criminal fence and underworld figure in New York during the early-to mid 19th century; principal rival of Ephraim Snow during the 1850s and 60s.

Joe Erich (fl. 1850–1865) was an American criminal fence and early underworld figure in New York City during the 1850s and 1860s. Based from Manhattan's Maiden Lane, Erich associated with many criminals and burglars of the era including Jack Spratt, Jack Adams, Tom Gordon, Tom Kelley, Jim Brady, Bowlegged Moore, Johnny Miller, Jim Painter, Amos Leeds, Bill Smith, Dick Collard, Jack Cooper and others.

By 1855, he had become one of the sought after fences in the United States dealing with professional criminals throughout the country. Unlike the later rivalries of his successors John D. "Travelling Mike" Grady and Fredericka "Marm" Mandelbaum, he often worked with his principal competitor Ephraim Snow who operated a dry goods store on Grand and Allen Streets.
