= Camphine =

Popular lamp fuel in the 1800s

Camphine was the British trade name of a 19th-century lamp fuel made from purified spirits of turpentine. Generally prepared by distilling turpentine with quicklime, it gave off a brilliant light. It was burned in chimney lamps that produced a strong draft to prevent smoking. Invented in 1838, it was a popular domestic lamp fuel until the 1860s. Camphine was alternatively spelled camphene, especially in the United States.

== History ==
On November 25, 1838, Luther Jones of New York City filed a patent for a lamp for burning spirits of turpentine, but it was Augustus Van Horn Webb, another New York inventor, who first used the term "camphene" when he filed a patent, antedated to November 23, 1838, for a "new and improved burner, together with a glass or chimney of a peculiar construction, for burning a composition which I denominate 'camphene.' " In England, an advertisement in an East Yorkshire newspaper in 1843 referred to William Oxley English "having obtained Her Majesty's Letters Patent for the Distilling of Camphine Oil." Other early inventors included Americans John S. Tough (a hanging camphene lamp, 1839) and Michael Dyott of Philadelphia (a “camphene-oil” lamp, 1840).

By the 1840s, camphene was one of the most widely used lamp fuels in the United States. According to historian Jeremy B. Zallen, for "households and businesses that could not afford sperm oil (at more than twice the cost) or the still rare and capital-intensive gas lighting systems, camphene was the overwhelming favorite." Advertisements for camphine (or camphene) that promoted its bright illumination and low cost were carried in newspapers in the United States and the Western World from the late 1830s through the 1860s. In July 1838, the New York Daily Herald carried an advertisement for "Webb's New Burner," described as producing "the greatest light . . . at the least expense.” Three months later, the Herald described a camphene chandelier on display at the American Institute Fair that was "invented and manufactured in this city, and . . . will give a light equal to gas, at the moderate price of one cent per hour for each burner." In London, "Clark and Co.'s New Spirit for the Camphene Lamps" was advertised for "only 3s. 9d. imperial gallon" in 1844. Similar ads were common in newspapers in the 1840s and 1850s.

Advertising aside, not all of camphine's qualities were universally appreciated. The British satirical magazine Punch reported that in the 1840s, "For domestic purposes the commonest illuminant was 'camphine,' an oil distilled from turpentine. Miss Mulock in The Ogilvies speaks of it as being always either 'too dull or too bright,' and Punch is not enthusiastic as to its virtues." An article published in a Dublin newspaper in August 1863 wrote of a "display of illuminations" in Paris that included colored camphine. "Unfortunately, while the eye was afforded the utmost gratification, another sense was painfully assailed by the fearful smell."

== Camphine vs burning fluid ==
The term camphine (or camphene) was often used interchangeably—and incorrectly—with a lamp fuel called burning fluid. Camphine, made of spirits of turpentine, had a high carbon content and tended to smoke unless burned in a lamp with a chimney. Burning fluid was a blend of alcohol and turpentine (one part spirits of turpentine and four parts highly distilled alcohol, according to a 1897 report for Congress) which allowed the turpentine to burn without smoking, but also made the fuel more volatile and more prone to explosions. Isaiah Jennings of New York was given credit in a 1858 Scientific American article for inventing burning fluid in 1830. In 1835, Henry Porter of Bangor, Maine, patented a mixture of camphene and alcohol that he called “Porter’s Patent Portable Composition Burning Fluid."

The two lamp fuels required different lamps. Burning fluid could be used in a simple small table and hand lamps, requiring no chimney. Burning fluid lamps had two long tapering wick tubes that looked like the letter V. The tubes had caps resembling thimbles to extinguish the light and prevent evaporation when the lamp was not in use. Camphine lamps had a single fixed wick with a flame spreader and a central draft system. One type of camphine lamp was called a Vesta lamp.

An 1853 article in Scientific American tried to dispel the confusion between the two fuels. "Camphene is highly rectified spirits of turpentine, contains no alcohol, and is not explosive. It will not burn in a common lamp without a chimney . . . [burning fluid] is a mixture of rectified turpentine, with about five or six times its quantity, by measure, of alcohol. . . . It is the volatile nature of the alcohol which is the cause of danger."

Because of its volatility, burning fluid was implicated in a spate of deaths and injuries from explosions and flash fires. In 1851, the Brooklyn Daily Eagle listed almost 60 accidents in the previous year involving camphene and burning fluid and a similar list appeared in the New York Times in 1852. In Jonesboro, Illinois, a newspaper reported 424 deaths and 623 injuries in Illinois between 1850 and 1860 due to burning fluid accidents. The Wilmington [NC] Daily Herald reported on a fatal accident in 1859, and added, "Will no experience, however painful, have the effect of banishing this dangerous fluid from common use?"

New "safety" lamp designs, such as Newell's Patent Safety Lamp, promised to prevent accidents, but when accidents and deaths continued, newspapers printed instructions on the safe use of oil lamps. A Nashville, Tennessee, newspaper warned In 1868, "The carrying of lamps about the house, thereby subjecting them to agitation and changes of temperature, should be strictly forbidden." John Lee Comstock, in the 1853 edition of his book Elements of Chemistry, listed eight steps to reduce the risk of explosion with burning oil lamps, starting with "Fill the lamps in the morning."

Burning fluid continued to be sold into the 1860s, according to Leib, but its cost increased during the Civil War when a federal tax on alcohol was reenacted. Sales of both camphine/camphene and burning fluid declined in the late 1800s as other sources of domestic illumination, including kerosene made from petroleum, gas lighting and electric lighting, began to predominate.
