= William Busteed =

Gambler and underworld figure in NY (b. c. 1848)

- Born: c. 1848
- Occupation: Professional gambler
- Known for: Gambler and underworld figure in New York at the start of the 20th century.

William H. Busteed (c. 1848–09/10/1924) was an American gambler and underworld figure in New York City at the start of the 20th century. The owner of a successful Broadway gambling resort, he was one of several men who rivaled "Honest" John Kelly, a leading political figure in Tammany Hall, as well as other prominent gamblers such as Sam Emery, Dinky Davis and John Daly.

In July 1920, he and David Gideon were indicted after their gambling house in Hewletts was raided by Neil H. Vandewater, council for the Nassau County Association, along with state troopers and several of his friends. Upon gaining entry, they found a secret door which opened electronically by a push button under the carpet hiding roulette tables and other gambling equipment. These were confiscated and taken to Mineola, Long Island along with five operators who named Busteed and Gideon as the owners.

Busteed and Gideon were among the first men convicted during the Nassau County's seven-month campaign against illegal gambling known as the "John Doe inquiry". Although both men were in their early seventies, Judge Townsend Scutter was unwilling to grant leniency unless they provided information on county officials who supported their activities. Their case remanded until October 18, Busteed pleaded guilty to running a gambling house and fined $1,000. Gideon and the others were given similar sentences. Busteed was later scheduled to be the chief witness in a major gambling case involving four Nassau County officials, Assemblyman Thomas McWhinney, Supervisor G. Wilber Doughty, Sheriff Charles W. Smith and Postmaster Thomas H. O'Keefe, but disappeared days before the trial. Busteed reappeared several days later in Boston, Massachusetts at a family member's residence, and returned to testify. Of these indictments, only McWhinney’s trial goes to a verdict, and he is acquitted. Smith’s indictment is dismissed mid trial, O’Keefe & Doughty’s indictments are dismissed prior to trial, and Cassidy died prior to trial.
