= Peter Sawyer (criminal) =

American thief and robber

- Occupation: Criminal
- Known for: California-born thief active in New York's Fourth Ward during the 1860s; credited as the first criminal to use drugs for the purposes of armed robbery.

Peter Sawyer (fl. 1850-1866) was an American thief and robber in New York City during the 1860s. A native of California, Sawyer appeared in New York's Forth Ward and the waterfront in the years following the American Civil War. He is credited as being the first criminal to drug victims for the purposes of mugging them. Although sailors' homes and crimp houses had previously been using "knock-out drops" and "slipping mickeys" to shanghai sailors, Sawyer was the first to make effective use for armed robbery. At first, Sawyer used simple snuff which he dropped into the victim's alcohol but perfected the practice later on with chloral hydrate. This was the drug of choice, with exception to the occasional use of morphine, preferred by those who followed Sawyer in similar robberies. Indeed, the practice became so common in the city that these men were referred to as "Peter Players" by the police and underworld alike.
