= Gallus Mag =

Female bouncer in New York City

- Born: unknown England, United Kingdom
- Died: unknown
- Occupation: Bar bouncer
- Known for: Female bouncer in 19th century Manhattan, Five Points personality, appears in The Gangs of New York

Gallus Mag (real name unknown) was a six-foot-plus tall, female bouncer at a 19th-century New York City bar called The Hole in the Wall. She figures prominently in New York City folklore. The name "Gallus" originated from the men's suspenders she was fond of wearing and "Mag" or "Meg" was likely her forename. The Hole in the Wall bar was at 279 Water Street, Manhattan, more recently the site of the historic Bridge Cafe.

== Bar bouncer ==
Herbert Asbury's book The Gangs of New York referenced her as one of Charley Monnell's "trusted lieutenants," along with Kate Flannery. He described her:

It was her custom, after she'd felled an obstreperous customer with her club, to clutch his ear between her teeth and so drag him to the door, amid the frenzied cheers of the onlookers. If her victim protested she bit his ear off, and having cast the fellow into the street she carefully deposited the detached member in a jar of alcohol behind the bar…. She was one of the most feared denizens on the waterfront and the police of the period shudderingly described her as the most savage female they'd ever encountered.

According to legend, Gallus Mag's ghost still haunts the building.

== In popular culture ==
- Gallus Mag's was the name of a bar near Corlears Hook in the mid- to late 19th century.
- In the 2002 Martin Scorsese film Gangs of New York, the character Hell-Cat Maggie, a female street gangster and fierce fighter, played by Cara Seymour, is a composite of Gallus Mag, the real-life Hell-Cat Maggie, and the apparently fictional Sadie the Goat. Scorsese recreated the restaurant as "Gallus Mag's Hole in the Wall."
- Gallus Mag was portrayed by Ronda Rousey in the "Scoundrels" episode of the Comedy Central series Drunk History.
- Gallus Mag is mentioned in a footnote in T. J. English's Paddy Whacked novel.
