= Mike Salter =

American underworld figure (1868–1922)

Michael Salter
- Born: 1868
- Died: December 15, 1922 (aged 54); Coney Island, New York, United States
- Other name: "Nigger Mike"
- Occupation: Businessman
- Known for: New York saloon keeper and underworld figure in New York City at the start of the 20th century.

Michael Salter or Saulter (1868 – December 15, 1922) was an American saloon keeper, ward heeler and underworld figure in New York City. He was of Russian-Jewish descent.

== Biography ==
He was born in 1868. He was a prominent figure in Chinatown, opening the first cabaret and dance hall in the district in 1904, and was popular among sportsmen at the turn of the 20th century. It was at his establishment that Irving Berlin started his early musical career as a singing waiter prior to becoming a professional ragtime musician. While working for Salter, Irving composed his first song for the club owner entitled "Marie from Sunny Italy" in 1907. The Pelham was also reportedly the birthplace of the fox trot.

His Pell Street resort, the Pelham, was considered part the boundary separating the territory of the Eastman and Five Points Gang, although Five Pointers leader Paul Kelly did not recognize the Eastmans' claim. His club, a popular Lower East Side underworld hangout, was also where James "Biff" Ellison and Pat "Razor" Riley planned the failed murder of Kelly at the New Brighton in November 1908. Salter eventually sold the club prior to Prohibition and opened a restaurant in Coney Island around 1919. He also bought a residence on East Fourth Street in Brighton Beach. On December 14, 1922, Salter suffered a heart attack while at Surf Avenue and Seaside Walk shortly before midnight. He was taken to a local hospital where he died the following day. At Salter's funeral, according to the New York Herald, "of the legions of notables who once found it pleasant to boast of Mike's friendship and familiarity with his notorious dive" only Berlin attended his funeral.
