= Martin McBreen =

American murder victim

Paddy the Priest
- Died: October 4, 1911; Hell's Kitchen, New York, United States
- Cause of death: Murdered
- Other names: Martin McBreen; Patrick McBreen; Patrick Breen
- Occupation: Saloonkeeper
- Known for: Hell's Kitchen personality and criminal associate of the Gopher Gang.

Martin McBreen or Patrick Breen (died October 4, 1911) was an American saloonkeeper and criminal associate of the Gopher Gang. A well-known and colorful Hell's Kitchen figure known as Paddy the Priest, he was the owner of a Tenth Avenue saloon frequented by the Gophers and other underworld figures. Traditional accounts claim that McBreen was shot and killed by close friend and Gopher member John "Happy Jack" Mulraney. Mulraney had a facial disfigurement, caused by a partial paralysis of his face, which resembled a permanent "crooked-like" half smile. When McBreen asked why he did not smile on the other side of his face, Mulraney killed him over the perceived insult and robbed the till. When apprehended by police, Mulraney reportedly remarked to officers "I ain't smiling on either side of my face!" His murder was one of the first major trials during the first decade of the 20th century and, quoting then Governor William Sulzer, was one of the most violent to have occurred in the city's history.

The shooting, according to news reports of the time, was committed by Mulraney and John J. Dowling in a night-long crime spree. He and Dowling were arrested with two other men, Martin Fay and Michael Saltzer, a week or so later by police detectives at Park Street and 108th Street. Following their arrest, Dowling confessed to breaking into the saloon with the intention of robbery and claimed that Mulraney had shot McBreen in self-defense when he appeared to be going for a gun. The two then fled and split up with Mulraney taking a trolley to Harlem while Dowling walked to the Bronx. Dowling, as well as the two others who accompanied them that night, were used as witnesses for the defense. Mulraney later admitted in a signed confession that he and Dowling hid in a cellar on West 52nd Street where they attempted to destroy evidence of their crime by disposing of the gun and scattered papers. These were later found by detectives and used to trace the murder to them. Mordecai Saltzman, an undercover detective for the Pinkerton Detective Agency, testified at the trial that his conversations with both Mulraney and Dowling that an unpaid debt of $50 may have also been a motive for the murder.

The crime was later referenced in the 2003 historical novel And All The Saints by Michael Walsh.
