= Daybreak Boys =

19th-century New York City street gang

- Founding location: New York City, New York
- Years active: late 1840s–1859
- Membership (est.): ?
- Criminal activities: Street fighting, knife fighting, assault, murder, piracy, robbery

The Daybreak Boys was a New York City street gang during the mid nineteenth century.

== History ==
The gang was formed in the late 1840s. By 1852, the teenaged Daybreak Boys were suspected by police to have been responsible for 20 to 40 murders between 1850 and 1852, as well as stealing goods estimated at $200,000. The gang was said to have a prospective member kill at least one man as a requirement for joining. Newspapers at the time report, perhaps with some exaggeration, that many gang members may have been as young as 12.

Under the leadership of members such as Nicholas Saul, Bill Howlett, Patsy the Barber, Slobbery Jim, "Cowlegged" Sam McCarthy, and Sow Madden, the gang was known for its reputation of unprovoked murder and sabotaging ships and other property, regardless of value, along the New York waterfront.

The gang's actions prompted a police response. Led by New York police officers Blair, Spratt, and Gilbert, over 12 gang members were killed in several gunfights in 1858. By the end of 1859 the gang, having lost much of its membership, was eventually broken up. Many of its members later became prominent criminals during the next several decades.

== Depictions in fiction ==
The Daybreak Boys, under the leadership of "Nick Saul and Billie Howlett," are brought to life in Chapter XVIII of MacKinlay Kantor's Pulitzer Prize-winning novel Andersonville (1955). The execution by hanging of Saul and Howlett is also depicted.

== See also ==
- B'hoy and g'hal
- Bowery Boys
- Dead Rabbits
- Plug Uglies
- Gangs of New York
- Sadie Farrell

== Resources ==
- Sifakis, Carl. Encyclopedia of American Crime, New York, Facts on File Inc., 1982
