= Dive bar =

Type of drinking establishment

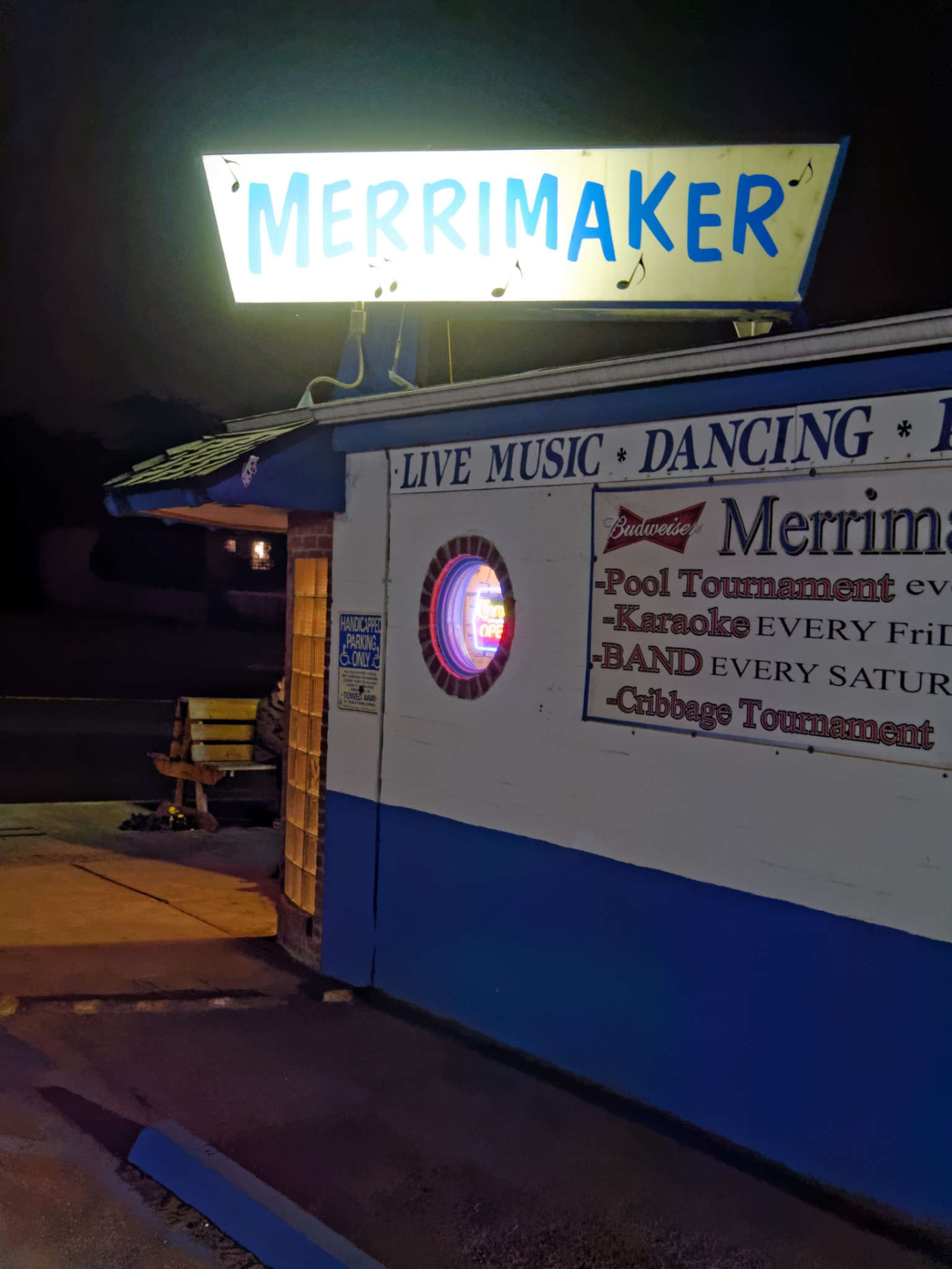
Dive bar 'The Merrimaker' in Los Osos, California

A dive bar is typically a small, unglamorous, eclectic, old-style drinking establishment with inexpensive drinks; it may feature dim lighting, shabby or dated decor, neon beer signs, packaged beer sales, cash-only service, and local clientele. The precise definition of a dive bar is rarely agreed on, and is the subject of spirited debates. The term dive was first used in the press in the U.S. in the 1880s to describe disreputable places that were often in basements into which one "dives below". Dive bars are known as "brown" bars or pubs in parts of Western and Northern Europe, such as brun bars or pubs in Norway.

== Description ==
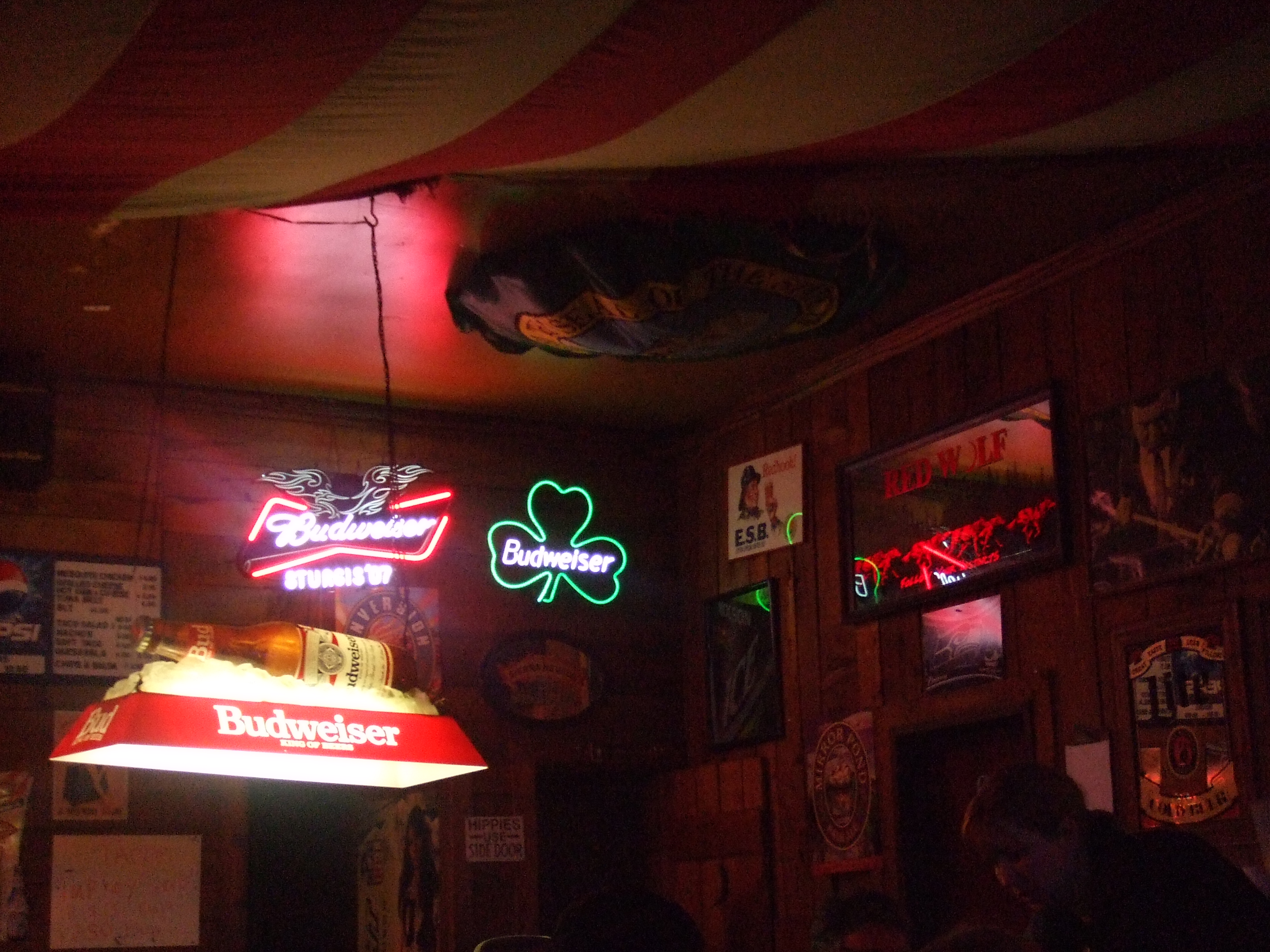
Typical dive bar decor, with neon Budweiser signs

Once considered a pejorative term, "dive bar" has more recently become a badge of distinction from patrons who seek authenticity in such establishments. Devotees may describe a bar as "very divey" or "not divey" and compose rating scales of "divey-ness". One such devotee is Steve Vensen, founder of a California group called the DBC (Dive Bar Conoisseurs) who says, "Every dive bar is like a snowflake: diverse and unique [...] you always get local subculture and every time is an adventure." Author Todd Dayton offers the following: "Dives [dive bars] are like pornography: hard to define but you know it when you see it". As to what distinguishes a dive bar from an ordinary bar, Dayton stated in 2004:

For me, the ideal dive bar is run by a beefy guy named Frank, where the aroma of yesterday's beer still hangs in the air, and your quest for clean bathrooms (or toilet paper, for that matter) will go eternally unanswered. A bottle of Bud costs two bucks, a shot of Jack, $3, and Pabst Blue Ribbon is served in a can. The sign outside says Steaks, Dinners, Cocktails—‌but there hasn't been any food served since FDR was president. The prevailing decorative elements are red Naugahyde, wood-toned Formica, and cinder blocks.

Dive bars traditionally only adhered to the minimal effort needed to provide guests with drinks; i.e., they typically do not advertise, provide parking, or have fancy signage. Dive bars are not known for their food. They often do not serve food beyond pretzels and snacks. For example, in 2018 a visitor to a well-known Nashville dive bar reported seeing a hand-written menu taped to the refrigerator, listing only pork rinds, popcorn, peanuts, and microwaved corn dogs (US $1). Dive bar bathrooms are usually poorly maintained or in a state of disrepair, with stalls occasionally enclosed by a shower curtain instead of a door. Transactions are typically cash-only, handled directly by the bartender and rarely involve computerized registers. The owner or a family member often tends bar. Patrons range widely in background and occupation, including locals who have remained regular customers for many years.

During the COVID-19 pandemic of the early 2020s, U.S. cities closed down bars and food service establishments, and many dive bar owners made repairs and cleaned up while they were closed down. Rick Dobbs, author of the 2019 book Local Spirit: Neighborhood Bars of Orleans Parish, said, "A dive can absolutely be cleaned up but still be a dive [...] it's the character and spirit of the space that counts". The news website SFGate recently covered the ongoing discussion over the definition of a "dive bar", whether it is the character or decor that make a "dive bar", and whether or not the image of the Merrimaker featured in this article still qualifies due to an extensive remodel in 2019.

== See also ==
- Drinking culture
- Flat-roofed pub
- Honky-tonk
- List of dive bars
- Roadhouse
- Speakeasy
- Types of drinking establishments
