= 1900s in organized crime =

This is a list of organized crime in the 1900s, arranged chronologically.

== 1900 ==
=== Events ===
- Monk Eastman claims New York's East Side for the Eastman Gang, now numbering an estimated 1,100. This eventually begins a gang war between the Eastmans and Paul Kelly's Five Points Gang.
- Evidence of La Mano Nera (The Black Hand), an Italian extortionist organization, is seen in Brooklyn, New York.
- Sicilian Mafia Don Vito Cascio Ferro [Cascioferro] arrives in New York to become a major leader of La Mano Nera (The Black Hand).
- A gang war begins between Tom Lee's On Leong Tong and an alliance of Wong Gets Hip Sings and Mock Duck's Four Brothers over gambling interests in New York's Chinatown. The war continues until a peace treaty is signed in 1909.

=== Births ===
- January 7 – Simone Scozzari, underboss of the Los Angeles crime family
- January 16 - Richard Lonergan, final leader of the White Hand Gang
- March 18 – Ferdinand Boccia, New York City mobster
- June 28 – Sam Mesi, Chicago (West Side) mobster and operator of three off-track betting operations
- July 2 – Michael "Trigger Mike" Coppola, caporegime of the 116th Street Crew
- October 12 – William Morris Bioff, Mafia extortionist

== 1901 ==
=== Events ===
- The Olympis Café, a dive bar in Chicago's Whiskey Row vice district, is opened by Sime Tuckhorn and quickly becomes frequented by the city's white slavery traders.
- Summer – Monk Eastman, while traveling through the Bowery, is attacked near Chatham Square by several members of the Five Points Gang. Eastman, armed only with brass knuckles and a slingshot, manages to fight them off knocking out three of the attackers before being shot twice in the stomach by the fourth member. Quickly fleeing the area, Eastman managed to walk to Gouverneur Hospital where he stayed for several weeks. Eastman refuses to speak to police about the incident. However, only a week after his release, a Five Pointer was found shot to death between Grand and Chrystie Streets.

=== Births ===
- Joseph Rao [Joseph Cangro], drug trafficker and associate of Dutch Shultz
- August 6 – Dutch Schultz [Arthur Flegenheimer], New York Prohibition gangster

== 1902 ==
=== Events ===
- Black Hand leader Giuseppe Morello is released from prison and begins counterfeiting operations to smuggle counterfeit $5 US dollar bills from Sicily into New York.
- December 1 – New York District Attorney William Travers Jerome orders a raid on gambling racketeer Richard Canfield's illegal gambling resort.

=== Births ===
- Settimo Accardi, New Jersey Mafia enforcer
- Angelo DeCarlo, Caporegime in the Genovese crime family
- Peter Magaddino, Joe Bonanno bodyguard and nephew of Stefano Magaddino
- Joseph Stacher, New York organized crime leader and Meyer Lansky associate.
- July 4 – Meyer Lansky [Maier Sucholjansky], Mafia financial advisor
- August 24 – Carlo Gambino, Gambino crime family Don and National Crime Commission director
- September 26 – Albert Anastasia [Umberto Anastasio] "Lord High Executioner"/"The Mad Hatter", Mangano crime family leader and member of Murder, Inc.
- November 22 – Joe Adonis (Joseph Doto), National Crime Syndicate member

== 1903 ==
=== Events ===
- New York Secret Service Chief William J. Flynn issues a statement regarding the Black Hand as "the most secret and terrible organization in the world".
- Spring – Backed by Monk Eastman, the Cherry Hill Gang and a new generation of Whyos under Bill "the Brute" Sanger begin fighting amongst each other resulting in hundreds being injured in gunfights. Crime in the area, particularly armed robbery and assault, dramatically increases as a result.
- April 14 – New York police find a body stuffed in a barrel, similar to the New Orleans "barrel murders" of the previous decade. The dead man was later identified by a US Secret Service agent as Benedetto Madonia, an associate of counterfeiters and Black Hand leaders Giuseppe Morello, Tomasso "The Ox" Petto, and Ignazio "the Wolf" Lupo. This would later lead to an investigation by New York police detective Joseph Petrosino.
- September 16–17 – A particularly violent gun battle between the Eastman and the Five Points Gangs, over an attempted raid by the Five Pointers of a local Rivington Street stuss game, eventually involves over a hundred gangsters (including the Gophers who fired at both the Eastmans and Five Pointers alike) causing Tammany Hall to force leaders Monk Eastman and Paul Kelly to make peace.
- Winter – The truce between Monk Eastman and Paul Kelly ends after a barroom brawl in a Bowery dive bar between gang members Hurst and Ford, of the Eastmans and Five Pointers respectively, with Hurst seriously injured. Eastman, demanding Ford's life, threatens to invade Kelly's territory. With Kelly's refusal to turn Ford over to the Eastmans, both sides again prepare for war. However, a truce is again arranged by Tammany Hall politician Tom Foley, who threatens to withdraw political protection from the gangs if they did not comply. A prize fight is arranged between the two gang leaders which lasts over two hours until both men eventually collapse and the fight is declared a draw. Following the fight, both gang leaders continue preparing for war.
- Giuseppe Masseria emigrates to New York, United States from Sicily to escape a murder charge.

=== Births ===
- Vincent "Mad Dog" Coll, Irish American, Prohibition era gangster
- Samuel Levine (Joseph Brown) "Red", New York (Brooklyn) mobster and Murder, Inc. member
- David Berman, Murder, Inc. member and Las Vegas crime syndicate member
- Russell Bufalino, Pennsylvania crime syndicate leader
- Frank Wortman, St. Louis crime syndicate leader and Shelton Gang member
- September 22 – Joseph Valachi, Genovese crime family soldier, and government informant.

== 1904 ==
=== Events ===
- The headquarters of the On Leong Merchant Association is moved to N.Y, New York.
- Johnny Torrio, under the alias J.T. McCarthy, opens a saloon on New York's James Street and Walker Street which operates as a bordello. Hiring several former James Street Gang members, of which he was a member as a teenager, as protection he becomes involved in Paul Kelly's Five Points Gang becoming a top lieutenant by the following year.
- February 2 – Monk Eastman is arrested after fleeing from a failed robbery. Without protection from Tammany Hall, he is later sentenced to ten years in Sing Sing Prison.
- November 1 – Richie Fitzpatrick is killed by "Kid Twist" Max Zwerbach during peace negotiations between the two rival factions of the Eastman Gang. Several weeks later the remaining men of Fitzpatrick's gang are killed by Zwerbach lieutenant Vach "Cyclone Louie" Lewis.
- November 3 – Hip Sing Tong leader Mock Duck is wounded in a gunfight by three On Leong hatchet men near his Pell Street home during the New York Tong war.

=== Births ===
- Joseph Lanza "Socks", New York Fulton Fish Market waterfront leader
- James T. Licavoli, Cleveland Mafia leader
- Ettore Zappi (aka Tony Russo), Gambino crime family Capo
- Frank Tieri "Funzi", Genovese crime family boss
- August 10– Frankie Carbo, boxing promoter and Murder, Inc. member

== 1905 ==
=== Events ===
- Then 14-year-old Salvatore Sabella, future boss of the Philadelphia crime family, murders a local butcher in Sicily, for whom Sabella was an apprentice, who reportedly violently beat the boy. Sabella is sent to prison in Milan in 1908.
- May 26 - One day following the shooting of Chick Tricker in a Five Points bar, Paul Kelly henchman Thomas "Eat 'Em Up Jack" McManus is fatally bludgeoned over the head with an iron bar while walking in the Bowery.
- June 1 – Teamsters President Cornelius Shea is accused of taking bribes in order to call off the 1905 Chicago Teamsters' strike. He is acquitted in two trials in January and February 1907.
- October 3 - Benjamin "Dopey Benny" Fein is arrested for robbery and assault.
- October 21 - Tomasso Petto, a.k.a. "Petto the Ox," a former member of Giuseppe Morello's Mafia gang in New York, is shot to death on his way home in Browntown, PA, near Pittston, where he has been living under the alias "Luciano Parrino."

=== Births ===
- Frank "Bomp" Bompensiero, San Diego Mafia Capo and informant
- Gerardo "Jerry" Catena, Genovese crime family member and National Crime Syndicate leader
- Gaspar (Gaspare) DiGregorio, Capo in the Bonanno crime family
- Michele Navarra, physician and Capo of a cosca in the Sicilian mafia
- John "Handsome Johnny" Roselli (born Filipo Sacco), Chicago Outfit member
- Joseph "Joe Bananas" Bonanno, boss of the Bonanno crime family

=== Deaths ===
- May 26 - Thomas "Eat 'Em Up Jack" McManus, member of Paul Kelly's Five Points Gang
- Oct. 21 - Tomasso Petto, a.k.a. "Petto the Ox," member of the Morello crime family

== 1906 ==
=== Events ===
- Paul Kelly's nightclub Little Naples is forced to close under pressure from reform movements.
- Louis "Louie the Lump" Pioggi joins the Five Points Gang at age seventeen. Within two years he would become a prominent gunman within the gang.
- Nicola Gentile becomes a member of the Philadelphia crime family.
- Charles "Lucky" Luciano, then nine-years-old, immigrates to New York with his family.
- March 8 - Lupo the Wolf is arrested and charged with kidnapping Tony Bonzuffi, the son of an East Side banker and suspected Black Hand victim.
- November 1 - Giuseppe "Joe" Morello, a pimp and alleged "Black Hand" gang leader in New York (not to be confused with Mafioso Giuseppe "the Clutch Hand" Morello), is killed when one of his own men stabs him in the heart with a poisoned needle.
- November 13 - Alleged Black Hand gang leader Munziato Legato is killed when one of his intended victims outdraws him, shooting him dead.

=== Arts and literature ===
- The Story of the Kelly Gang (film)

=== Births ===
- February 24 – Anthony Anastasio, New York Waterfront leader for the Gambino crime family
- February 28 – Benjamin "Bugsy" Siegel, Meyer Lansky associate, Murder, Inc. member, and Las Vegas casino owner
- March 28 – Antonino Joseph "Joe Batters" Accardo, boss of the Chicago Outfit
- October 9 – William "Smokes" Aloisio, Chicago Outfit member and syndicate hitman

== 1907 ==
=== Events ===
- Charles Luciano is arrested for shoplifting.
- April 17 – Joseph Petrosino arrests Neapolitan camorrista Don Enrico Alfano while investigating the Black Hand and holds him for deportation to Italy.
- August 1 - Joe Masseria is arrested for burglary and extortion but is released on suspended sentence.
- August – Upon the death of Michael Cassius McDonald on August 9, the Chicago crime lord's criminal operations are divided among his former lieutenants: Chicago alderman Jacob "Mont" Tennes, gambler "Big" Jim O'Leary and the Bud White Combine. However, three main factions arise as a bombing campaign to control the city's illegal gambling operations continues throughout the summer.

=== Births ===
- Abe Reles [Abraham Reles] "Kid Twist", Murder, Inc. member and informant
- December 1 – Joseph Aiuppa "Joey Doves", Chicago Mafia leader

== 1908 ==
=== Events ===
- A gang war breaks out between Paul Kelly's Five Points Gang and "Kid Twist" Max Zwerbach's Eastman Gang.
- By the end of the year Johnny Torrio's two dozen Brooklyn brothels earn over $5,000 a week.
- Frankie Yale is allowed to join Johnny Torrio's Black Hand organization in New York.
- Hymie Weiss is first arrested for burglary. It is this incident that, while caught robbing a perfume store, he is dubbed the "Perfume Burglar" by Chicago reporters.
- Joseph Petrosino arrests Neapolitan camorrista Enrico Costabili, who is later deported to Italy.
- Then 17-year-old Salvatore Sabella, future boss of the Philadelphia crime family, is sentenced to three years imprisonment in Milan for the murder of a local butcher, of which he was an apprentice, in 1905.
- April 25 – Frank Costello is arrested for assault and robbery but is released.
- May 14 – Eastman Gang leader Max Zwerbach and lieutenant Vach Lewis are killed in an ambush by members of the Five Points Gang after an argument between Zwerbach and Louis Pioggi over Coney Island dance hall girl Carrol Terry.
- June 8 - Sicilian mafiosi Raffaele Palizzolo, wanted for murder, escapes Sicily and arrives in New York. He later leaves the city before Joseph Petrosino can arrest him.
- July 23 – Labor racketeer Cornelius Shea is sentenced in Boston to six months in prison for abandoning his wife and two young children.

=== Births ===
- Ernest Rupolo, Genovese crime family assassin
- March 17 – Raymond L. S. Patriarca, boss of the Patriarca crime family
- May 24 – Sam (Salvatore) Giancana, boss of the Chicago Outfit
- June 30 – Samuel "Teets" Battaglia, member of the Chicago Outfit
- September 6 – Anthony Joseph Biase, leader of the Omaha faction of the National Crime Syndicate
- October 7 – Harry "Happy" Maione, Murder, Inc. hitman

=== Deaths ===
- May 14 – Max Zwerbach, leader of New York City's Eastman Gang
- May 14 – Vach Lewis, Eastman Gang lieutenant

== 1909 ==
=== Events ===
New York gang leader Humpty Jackson is arrested and sent to prison for attempted murder, where he remains until his death in 1914.

- March 12 – New York police detective Joseph Petrosino is killed in Palermo, Sicily by Sicilian Mafia Don Vito Cascio Ferro while investigating the Le Mano Nera (The Black Hand).
- June – Monk Eastman is released from Sing Sing prison by the State Board of Parole. (The parole is first reported in Buffalo on the 19th, with most of the New York City papers carrying the story on the following day.) However upon his return to the East Side, Eastman finds the remnants of his gang had broken apart since Max Zwerbach's death as various factions fought among each other over what was left of the former Eastman territory.
- July 23 – Labor racketeer Cornelius Shea is sentenced to 5 to 25 years in Sing Sing for brutally slashing and stabbing his mistress 27 times in New York City.
- August – A violent Tong war begins after Low Hee Tong, a member of the New York Four Brothers Tong, purchases a rival Tong slave girl Bow Kum who is murdered on the 15th.
- October 18 – English reformer "Gypsy" Smith leads a march against Chicago's South Side Levee District.
- December 30 – Ah Hoon, a comedian and member of the On Leong Tong, is killed in his home by rival Hip Song members.

=== Births ===
- January 12 – Charles Binaggio, Kansas City mobster
- March 24 – Clyde Barrow, leader of the Barrow Gang and lover to Bonnie Parker
- May 17 – John J. Vitale, boss and underboss of the St. Louis crime family
- July 20 – Vincent Coll "Mad Dog", New York bootlegger and hitman
- July 28 – Harry Strauss, Murder, Inc. hitman
- September 13 – Sam DeStefano "Mad Sam", Chicago Outfit enforcer

=== Deaths ===
- March 12 – Joseph Petrosino, New York police detective
- August 15 – Bow Kum, Tong slave girl
- December 30 – Ah Hoon, a comedian and associate of the On Leong Tong
