= Jimmy Kelly (saloon keeper) =

American saloon keeper, political organizer and underworld figure

- Born: Giovanni de Silvio
- Other names: Jim Kelly; James Kelly; James de Silva
- Occupation: Saloon keeper
- Known for: Saloon keeper, political organizer and underworld figure in New York during the start of the 20th century.

Giovanni de Silvio or Jimmy Kelly (fl. 1900–1914) was an American saloon keeper, political organizer and underworld figure in New York City during the start of the 20th century. He was the owner the Fourteenth Street saloon The Folly as well as the popular Mandarin Cafe in Chinatown, located in the notorious "Bloody Angle" along Doyers Street, and was a hangout for politicians, gang leaders and other noted criminals of the era. His cafe was also the scene of several violent incidents, especially during the Tong War, which included, in 1910, the fourth attempted suicide of Chinatown character John "Dippy" Rice and the 1912 murder of Hen Ken Yum, the latter a high-level member of the On Leong Tong and a lieutenant of Mock Duck.

He himself controlled a small gang of thugs-for-hire and was an ally of the Eastman Gang, particularly Jack Zelig, but later became involved in an underworld rivalry with Chick Tricker and Jack Sirocco. For several years, he feuded with Tricker and Sirocco over control of Chinatown's graft and was the main competitor of their establishment The Flea Bag. He became a major political organizer for Tammany Hall, successful in taking power in Chinatown following the arrest of Monk Eastman in 1904, and was eventually awarded control of the district by Tammany politicians. Both Tricker and Sirocco resisted Kelly's attempts to take over but were forced out after a police raid led to the close of The Flea Bag.

== 1905 ==
In May 1905, he was assaulted in the Bowery near Great Jones Street by members of the Five Points Gang under Paul Kelly. Although he received only minor injuries, bouncers from The Folly and New Brighton began fighting each other resulting in three men being stabbed and the murder of "Eat 'Em Up" Jack McManus. Both Kelly and Tricker were both assaulted in separate incidents shortly before McManus's murder, Kelly being stabbed in the back with a stiletto on First Avenue near Fourth Street.

== 1908 ==
In November 1908, while walking to his home, he was attacked by members of the Humpty Jackson Gang shortly after hosting a ball at Tammany Hall. He was shot in the stomach but eventually recovering from his wounds and refusing to identify his attackers. He received special protection from the New York Police Department and had a particularly close relationship with Detective Charles Becker. While in attendance at Sirocco's annual ball at Tammany Hall in February 1912, Becker overheard plans to murder Kelly and spent the rest of the night with several other officers guarding Kelly's place. Although no attack took place that night, Becker searched Sirocco's Little Rock headquarters at Broome Street and confiscated a rifle and two revolvers. The cafe was under guard for three more days when, while walking through the Bowery with Louie the Lump, an unidentified gunman fired at them from a hallway. Neither men were hit but later that day another attempt was made while the two were at Baxter Street after walking through Mulberry Bend Park. Once again, the unknown gunman missed but Louie fired three shots in return injuring day laborer Patrick McKenna as a result. Louie the Lump was taken into custody along with another man, suspected by police to be the shooter, while Kelly ran to Elizabeth Street Station where he asked for protection. Sirocco was later arrested on an unrelated charge but released on bail. Louie the Lump was a known associate of Kelly, at times acting as his bodyguard, and participated in attacking "hangers on" from Sirocco's gang and planting weapons on them for police to find when they were arrested. The alleged assassin was identified as Charles I. "Game" Sola, both he and Louie the Lump standing trial for the gunfight, and the case against Kelly's bodyguard was dismissed.

By mid-July, a number of establishments were closed and put under police guard following a series of violent gang fights which had broken out within a 10-hour period on the night of June 5. These included Sirocco's place at Chatham Square, Chick Tricker's Bowery emporium, the Chatham Club and three other Fourteenth Street saloons where the majority of the fighting occurred. Only Kelly's Mandarin Cafe was allowed to stay open, despite it having a police guard as well. He was later one of several men arrested during official inquiry during the Becker-Rosenthal trial but was not implicated in the actual murder according to Deputy Commissioner Dougherty.

== 1913 ==
This feud eventually came to a head in 1913 in a dispute over their respective bouncers being hired as private security, known then as "strong arm squads", for sporting events and other occasions. Matters worsened when Detective Val O'Farrell, in charge of hiring security for Madison Square Garden, refused to hire several of his men for the annual six-day bicycle race being held at the venue. On the morning of December 12, a gunfight broke out between members of his club and those from Sirocco's near Madison Square Garden. Around 2:00 am, a group of Sirocco's men left Madison Square Garden and were ambushed near the corner of Fourth Avenue and Twenty-sixth Street by Kelly's men firing from behind a Madison Avenue trolley car. Although the gunfight was brief, an estimated fifty rounds had been used and ended only until gunmen on both sides ran out of ammunition. No one was reported injured, the passengers on the trolley avoiding being hit by dropping to the floor, despite the large number of spectators entering and leaving Madison Square Garden to watch the annual six-day bicycle race being held.

Most of the participants were able to escape as police from local precincts investigating the gunfire began entering the area. Kelly's gunmen, according arriving to police officers, were picked up by a large black touring car which they began firing at hoping to shoot out the tires. The car was last seen heading towards Second Avenue but police were unable to pursue them. Two of Sirocco's men, Tony Rossa and Frank Jula, were arrested by police and taken to Jefferson Market Court where they were arraigned and held on a $2,000 bail. The two had no previous criminal record but had ties with Jack Sirocco and were believed to have thrown away their weapons. Six empty revolvers were found by police at the scene.
