= Jack Pioggi =

New York saloon keeper and underworld figure

Jack Poggi
- Occupation: Saloon keeper / bar owner
- Known for: New York saloon keeper and underworld figure at the start of the 20th century; rival of "Big" Jack Zelig.
- Relatives: Louis Poggi, brother

"Big" Jack Poggi or Pioggi (fl. 1906 – 1914) was an American saloon keeper and underworld figure in New York City at the start of the 20th century. His bar was the scene of a legendary gang fight in 1912.

== Career ==
A rival of "Big" Jack Zelig, he had been the chief bouncer at Callahan's Dance Hall before opening a Lower East Side resort on Doyers Street near Chinatown's notorious "Bloody Angle". The building, known as Poggi's, could be reached through five Chatham Square alleyways, one of these being though a local dairy store and another through the back door of a barbershop, and was known to be a place "where anything goes". He later became partners with Chick Tricker, a member of the Eastman Gang, who bought an interest in his establishment to retain a connection in the district while he expanded his holdings elsewhere in Manhattan. His brother Louis "Louie the Lump" Poggi, a well-known gunman and member of the Five Points Gang, was responsible for the murders of Max "Kid Twist" Zwerbach and his bodyguard Vach "Cyclone Louie" Lewis in 1908.

== Gangfight ==
On the morning of June 3, 1912, Poggi became involved in a gang fight when several gangsters attempted to force their way into the rear entrance of Poggi's cafe. An argument over a woman, Wanda Murphy, started at Coney Island earlier that morning and resulted in a gunfight in Chinatown then ending outside the Criminal Courts Building where one of the men, Charlie Torti, shot Jack Zelig. Zelig had just been released from the court's custody after payment of $1,000 bail. Seriously wounded, he was taken to Hudson Street Hospital but not expected to live. The gunfight at Poggi's place, however, is where the violence reached its height as over forty shots were fired and one man, Harris Baker, was wounded in the foot. The police eventually arrived and arrested several of the participants on charges of disorderly conduct. Among those arrested at the scene were Jack Zelig, Jacob Siegel and Harris Baker. Wanda Murphy, the cause of the dispute, was found nearby "suffering from bruises of the chest" and taken to Volunteer Hospital where she was treated by a doctor and held in custody as a witness. Poggi and Zelig had been involved in an underworld feud and police speculated that the men involved were likely members of their respective gangs. When the case was finally held at the Tombs Police Court, police had brought in Chick Tricker and James Martelli. All were released on $1,000 bail bonds and where Zelig was shot as he left the court.
