= The Bottler =

- Born: Russia
- Died: June 1, 1907; Manhattan, New York, United States
- Cause of death: Murdered
- Occupation: Professional gambler
- Known for: Gambler and underworld figure in New York during the early 20th century.

Charles "the Bottler" Greenwich (died June 1, 1907) was a Russian-born American gambler and underworld figure in New York. He ran a highly popular stuss parlor in the Five Points district during the early 20th century, one which was considered the most successful in the East Side, until his death when he confronted Kid Twist and the Eastman Gang from taking over his gambling establishment. It was his death, according to gangland lore, that resulted in the murder of Kid Twist and his bodyguard Cyclone Louie by Louie the Lump in 1908.

== Biography ==
Little is known of his life prior to his arrival in New York, except only that he was of Russian origin, and was described as "round, inoffensive, well-dressed and affable". He soon gained a reputation as a "money maker" in the underworld, specifically for his clever methods for cheating, and began building up a successful illegal gambling empire based around his Glonconda stuss parlor on Suffolk Street. The Bottler's success soon attracted Kid Twist, then leader of the Eastman Gang, who took advantage of The Bottler's affiliation with the rival Five Points Gang and sought to take over his operation by forcing The Bottler to take on Harry Stahl as his partner. (Stahl was presented as "Kid Dahl" in Alfred Henry Lewis's 1912 book, The Apaches of New York, a fictionalized true crime novel about New York City's early gangsters, which crime historian Herbert Asbury used as a source for his 1928 book, The Gangs of New York.) Unsure that the Five Pointers could protect him, especially in the midst of their gang war with the Eastmans, The Bottler was forced to agree to Kid Twist's terms. He and Stahl split the profits equally for six weeks until Stahl brought in The Nailer and ordered The Bottler to leave. Although he considered going to the police, The Bottler decided against it and instead barred his doors to Stahl and sent word to the Five Pointers in preparation to make a stand against the Eastmans.

At this time, a police detective from Central Office was tracking down a lush worker when he stumbled upon the scene between the desperate gambler and Harry Stahl both brandishing firearms at each other. The detective managed to relieve both men of their weapons and took them into custody whereupon he marched them both to the local police precinct where the two were charged with disturbance of the peace. Both were tried and Stahl, who repeatedly threatened the life of The Bottler, was fined $5 and released. It was soon after this incident that Stahl allegedly began planning the murder of The Bottler. A few days later, on June 1, 1907, while The Bottler was at his place, a stranger entered the stuss parlor, shot him in the chest twice and left. The Bottler then staggered down Suffolk Street and entered a drug store on Broome Street, where he fell down dead. Harry Stahl was arrested the following evening, and an inquest was held. However, with Kid Twist being at the Delancy station house arguing over the release of an Eastman member and Stahl seen arguing with the owner of a Houston Street restaurant, both men were released due to lack of evidence. Some time after that, a young member of the Five Points Gang known as Louie the Lump ambushed Kid Twist and his bodyguard Cyclone Louie at a Coney Island dance hall and gunned down the two men. The argument had been over a showgirl, Carroll Terry, however it was widely speculated that this had been the Five Pointers' retribution for The Bottler's murder.

The Bottler was portrayed in the 1999 historical novel Dreamland by Kevin Baker.
