= Philip Davidson =

- Born: 1882; United States
- Died: Unknown
- Occupations: Gangster, fruit peddler

Philip "Red Phil" Davidson (1882 – date unknown) was an American criminal and underworld figure in New York City during the early 20th century. A known associate of Jack Sirocco, a lieutenant in Paul Kelly's Five Points Gang, he was responsible for the 1912 murder of Eastman Gang leader "Big" Jack Zelig, though at the time of his arrest police were unable to find a police record.

A retired Russian Jewish fruit peddler living at 111 E. Seventh Street, Davidson shot and killed New York gang leader "Big" Jack Zelig while on a Thirteenth Street trolley on October 5, 1912 following an altercation during a card game at a local cafe. It was suggested immediately that Zelig's murder was an attempt to keep him from testifying against Charles Becker in the Rosenthal murder case involving the Lenox Avenue Gang. However, Davidson later turned himself into authorities, telling police that Zelig had attacked him with a blackjack and robbed him, and that revenge for these acts was his motive for killing Zelig.

Although Zelig was scheduled to testify during Becker's trial regarding his connection to the Rosenthal murder case, police were unable to find any connection between Davidson and Becker.

New York State Judge Goff sentenced Davidson to 20 years in prison after he pleaded guilty to second degree murder. While incarcerated in Sing Sing Prison, Davidson offered to testify in Becker's defense, claiming that Zelig had paid him $500 to murder Herman "Beansie" Rosenthal but that he chose not to participate in the murder. His statement, which he had first told to his cellmate, would have shown that the money used to hire the Lenox Avenue Gang came from Zelig, rather than Becker. Davidson's testimony was refuted by police and prison officials, and Sheriff Julius Harburger referred to Davidson as "the most cowardly prisoner he had ever seen".
