= James Brady (criminal) =

American criminal and founder of the Yakey Yakes

Yakey Yake Brady
- Born: James Brady; 1875; Manhattan, New York, United States
- Died: September 2, 1904 (aged 29); Jersey City, New Jersey, US
- Other names: John Brady; Yake Yake Brady
- Occupation: Cooper
- Known for: Gang leader and founder of the Yakey Yakes

John or James "Yakey Yake" Brady (1875 – September 2, 1904) was an American criminal, the founder and leader of the Yakey Yakes, an independent street gang based in Manhattan, New York at the turn of the 20th century. Under his leadership, the gang, which had its base around the Brooklyn Bridge, operated freely within the territory of the Eastman Gang and successfully fought off attempts by both the Eastmans and the Five Points Gang to absorb the Yakey Yakes into either organization. Only following Brady's death from tuberculosis did the gang finally disappear.

== Biography ==
=== Early life and the Yakey Yakes ===
Brady was born and raised in the Irish enclave of Cherry Hill known as "the Gap" (the present-day northern end of Cherry Street). He worked as an apprentice jockey as a youth, but became too heavy to turn professional. Returning to "the Gap", he worked as a cooper and later joined the Cherry Hill Gang. It was around this time that he was given his familiar nickname during an altercation with a German-American saloon-keeper who, "suffering from a battered nose", mispronounced Brady's first name as "Jake" or "Yake".

He eventually deserted the Cherry Hill Gang when they moved their headquarters to Chatham Square, reorganized as the Five Points Gang and moved into more violent crime such as theft and armed robbery. Brady formed his own gang, the Yakey Yakes, made up of "rough but fairly honest young fellows" from his own neighborhood. He and the Yakey Yakes were confronted by both the Eastman Gang and the Five Pointers under Paul Kelly, as were Al Rooney and his Fourteenth Street Gang, and defeated them in street fights on several occasions. They eventually forced both the Eastmans and the Five Point Gang to "do their fighting north of Catherine Street".

Although the NYPD was harsh in its descriptions of him, Brady was described by The New York Sun as far less violent than his contemporary counterparts such as gang-leaders Monk Eastman and Paul Kelly. He rarely used his revolver, instead using his fists or a club, and fought "merely for personal insults or dislikes". He often instructed members of the Yakey Yakes to avoid using violent methods in criminal activities, and his gang was not involved in either prostitution or white slavery. Despite his advice, many members of his gang eventually ended up in Sing Sing prison while the most severe punishment Brady received was a $10 fine. Brady was, above all, known in the underworld as a charismatic "natural-born leader" and enjoyed a loyal following.

=== Suicide of George Stewart ===
In May 1903, Brady left New York apparently "disgusted" with what he viewed as continual police harassment and stayed in New Jersey for the following two months. He returned to New York on July 4 and celebrated Independence Day by drinking with several of his friends on James Street. During the festivities, local longshoreman George Stewart kicked a can "full of mixed ale" from Brady's hands as a practical joke. A fight then occurred between the two men and eventually led to their arrest for disorderly conduct. Once in custody, Stewart made a formal charge against Brady for assault. This "greatly incensed" Brady, and Stewart, when he was not allowed to drop the charges, reportedly became "terror-stricken" and was reduced to tears. As they were taken to their cells, Stewart threatened that "I ain't going to wait until he kills me. I'll kill myself first."

Stewart apparently made good on this claim as he was found hanged in his cell half an hour later by one of the police doorman. He had been hanged with his own handkerchief from his cell door. His body was cut down and sent to Gouverneur Hospital then transferred to Bellevue. Brady was not charged with Stewart's suicide, instead he was arraigned at the Tombs Police Court and released the following day.

=== Cherry Hill shootout ===
On the night of June 27, 1904, Brady was arrested with two other men, John Sexton and George Emptage, after a gun battle on Cherry Hill and taken to the Oak Street Police Precinct. Police believed that the three were rivals for leadership of Brady's gang. A few weeks prior to the arrest, Emptage had been attacked by Brady and his friends and had barely managed to escape. Brady and Sexton were walking down Roosevelt Street on the night in question when they encountered Emptage who immediately drew a pistol and fired at them.

Brady and Sexton returned fire, and soon the shootout had attracted a large crowd. The gunfire had also been heard by officers in the nearby Oak Street Precinct and acting Police Captain Fennelly went to investigate taking with him officers Voss, Healey, Toumy and Cohen. By the time they arrived on the scene, it was "only by the free use of their clubs" that they were able to make their way through the large crowd to arrest the three men. Fennelly had to call for police reserves to disperse the crowd. Emptage had superficial wounds to his chin which were dressed by a Dr. Gould of the Hudson Street Hospital.

=== Death ===
Leaving Tombs Police Court after his arrest, Brady angrily exclaimed to a group of gangsters, "Jersey fer' mine fer' the rest of me life. I can't stick me beak in town no more widout de cops slammin' me." True to his word, Brady promptly left New York for good and settled in Jersey City, New Jersey. Brady had already owned and operated a small cooperage shop in Peck Slip. He wagered his business "on a turn of a card against a horse and express wagon owned by another young man" and as a result ended up owning two successful businesses. He continued as a cooper in Jersey City, while still managing his business interests in New York, until his death from tuberculosis on September 2, 1904.

== In popular culture ==
Brady features in the 2003 historical novel And All the Saints, Michael Walsh's fictional account of the life of gangster Owney Madden.
