= James T. Ellison =

New York City gangster (c. 1861–1920s)

- Biff Ellison, circa 1900
- Born: c. 1861; Maryland, U.S.
- Died: 1920s
- Occupations: Bartender, bar owner, brothel owner
- Conviction: First-degree manslaughter

James T. Ellison (born c. 1861-1920s), better known as Biff Ellison, was a New York City gangster affiliated with the Five Points Gang and later a leader of the Gopher Gang. He was noted for his propensity for physical violence as well as a dapper appearance that led The New York Times to describe him as "looking like a prosperous banker or broker" and contemporary chroniclers as "smooth-faced, high-featured, well-dressed, a Gangland cavalier" and "a fop in matters of dress".

Ellison was closely associated with gangster Jack Sirocco during the wars against the Eastman Gang during the early 1900s. In addition to running protection rackets that reputedly gained him a handsome annual income of somewhere between $2,000 and $3,000, Ellison owned or managed several bars and gambling establishments in New York City, including the gay bar and brothel Columbia Hall (aka Paresis Hall) and an illegal pool hall occupying the basement of Ellison's residence at 231 East 14th Street. His nickname, Biff, was a period synonym for "punch" or "hit", and it was coined in response to a youthful fight in which Ellison, then working as a bartender, knocked unconscious a customer who refused to pay for a beer. He was also known as Young Biff, Fourteenth Street Biff, and Biff Ellison II to distinguish him from Frank "Biff" Ellison (1850 — 1904), a minor Manhattan society figure who had been convicted of assault in 1893 and sent to Sing Sing prison.

Biff Ellison appears as a secondary character in the 1994 novel The Alienist by Caleb Carr. Carr describes the gangster as homosexual and makes him the central figure in a colorful scene at the gay bar Columbia Hall.

== Career ==
After moving from his native Maryland to New York City in the early 1880s, Ellison was employed as a bartender at a variety of establishments, notably Fat Flynn's (Barney Flynn's) and Pickerelle's, where he developed friendships that led to his career in the world of organized crime and Tammany Hall. As one writer observed, "The politicians loved [Ellison], for he was a valuable man around election time, the mere sight of his huge bulk being sufficient to prevent many an honest citizen exercising his right of franchise".

Ellison came to wider public notice in the summer of 1902 after assaulting a police officer, Detective Sergeant Jeremiah Murphy, at Henry Wulfer's Sharkey's, a Fourteenth Street saloon that stood opposite Tammany Hall. The officer was so severely beaten that he was hospitalized for two weeks yet Ellison escaped serious jail time. "The politicians closed the officer's mouth," an observer noted, "and opened Ellison's cell".

In February 1903 the police attempted to raid Ellison's pool hall on the parlor floor of his 231 East 14th Street address, but with no warrant in hand were refused entry by Ellison who was then discharged from police court the next day and boasted that his place would never be raided again. On March 27, 1903 the police of the 15th and 18th precincts came back, this time armed with a warrant, an axe and a sledge hammer and raided Ellison's pool hall. The haul netted thirty-two men but only Ellison was held along with his liquor dealer James Sullivan and two other employees. Ellison protested his club was a legitimate one but could produce no charter.

After Jack Sirocco defected to the Eastman gang, Ellison came into conflict with the leader of the Five Pointers, Paul Kelly, and in turn defected to the Gopher Gang. Then, on November 23, 1905, he and three other men, including Pat "Razor" Riley and Jimmy Kelly, attempted to assassinate Paul Kelly at his New Brighton club on Great Jones Street, where he was drinking with bodyguards Pat "Rough House" Hogan and William James "Red" Harrington. Although Kelly escaped harm, Harrington was shot and his body dragged from the Paul Kelly Association rooms to the Little Naples (New Brighton Athletic Club) saloon below and thrown into the washroom. Ellison fled to Baltimore, though six years later he returned to New York City and was arrested on an outstanding bench warrant for manslaughter. While Ellison's motive never became clear, the press put forward several possible reasons why Ellison attacked Paul Kelly. One was retaliation for the shooting of Jack Sorocco outside Kelly's resort a few days prior over some 'stuffed ballots'. The second for the murder of "Eat-Em-Up" Jack McManus, a friend of Ellison, and the third for Kelly failing to equitably distribute political campaign money of which he had custody in the district.

The gangster was tried before the Criminal Branch of the New York Supreme Court in 1911. Around fifty members of the Jimmy Kelly gang and seventy-five members of the Five Points gang were in attendance during the proceedings. Concerned their presence might influence the verdict, they were later forced to leave. During the trial Ellison threatened a court officer as well as prosecutors, stating that if he were found guilty he would not rest " ... until those prosecuting guys has got theirs." Ultimately the only witness who identified Ellison, not Riley, as the shooter was Hogan, identified as "a reformed gangster" in a newspaper article about the end of the trial. Though Ellison had been promised his Tammany Hall connections would ensure he escaped prosecution, he was convicted of first-degree manslaughter on June 8, 1911, and sentenced to serve eight to 20 years at Sing Sing prison.

== Death ==
Ellison reportedly became mentally unstable during his imprisonment and was committed to an asylum where he died in the 1920s.
