= Crazy Butch Gang =

1890s street gang in New York City

- Formation: c. 1890
- Dissolved: 1900s
- Purpose: Pickpocketing; Sneak thievery
- Location: Lower East Side, Manhattan, New York, United States

The Crazy Butch Gang was an American juvenile street gang active in the New York City underworld during the late 19th century. Largely active in Manhattan's Lower East Side, the group were widely known as the cities top pickpockets and sneak thieves during the "Gay Nineties" period. An early member of the gang, Jack Zelig, later became known as a prominent New York gangster.

== Crazy Butch ==
Simon Erenstoft, also known as "Crazy Butch", was supposedly orphaned at age 8, abandoned by his parents in Manhattan, where he began pickpocketing. According to legend, he later found a dog, which he later named Rabbi, and trained it to snatch purses and bring them around the corner at Willett Street and Stanton Street where he would be waiting.

== Crazy Butch Gang ==
In the early 1890s the gang began a "snatch racket", where a gang member would purposely drive his bicycle into a pedestrian and begin an argument. As a group had gathered to watch the argument the other gang members would pickpocket the crowd. Then they would meet back at their headquarters on Forsyth Street on Manhattan's Lower East Side to divide up the money.

The gang was allied to the Eastman Gang who were at almost constant war with the Five Points and Humpty Jackson Gangs between the late 1890s and early 1900s as they were incorporated into the Squab Wheelmen, an ally of Monk Eastman's organization. The gang broke up when Crazy Butch was killed by Harry the Soldier in a gunfight over a female shoplifter known as the Darby Kid.
