= Big Jack =

Big Jack may refer to:

== Arts and entertainment ==
- Big Jack (film), a 1949 film
- "Big Jack" (song), by Australian hard rock band AC/DC
- "The Big Jack", a track on the 1994 album Dance Naked by John Mellencamp
- Big Jack, an African-American action figure in the Big Jim (toy line)

== People ==
- Jack Arkwright (1902–1990), English rugby league footballer
- Big Jack Armstrong, American DJ born John Charles Larsh in 1945
- Big Jack Johnson (1939 or 1940–2011), American blues musician
- Jack McGill (ice hockey, born 1921) (1921–1994), Canadian hockey player
- John J. McNulty Jr. (1922–2009), American politician
- Alistair Nicholson (born 1978), former Australian rules footballer
- Jack Pioggi (fl. 1906–1914), American saloon keeper and underworld figure in New York City
- Jack Wisner (1899–1981), American Major League Baseball pitcher
- Big Jack Zelig (1888–1912), New York gangster

== Other uses ==
- Nickname of the Union Pacific EMD DDA40X locomotive
- Big Jack Lake - see List of lakes in Woodruff County, Arkansas
- Big Jack, a burger sold by Hungry Jack's

== See also ==
- Big Jacks Creek
- Big Jacks Creek Wilderness
- Big Jake
