= Julie Morrell =

American gunman

- Died: December 2, 1911
- Other name: Jules Morello
- Occupation: Freelance gunman
- Allegiance: Eastman Gang

Julie Morrell or Jules Morello (died December 2, 1911) was an American freelance gunman associated with the New York Eastman Gang around the start of the 20th century. He was hired by Jack Sirocco and Chick Tricker to murder Eastman leader Jack Zelig, who had been engaged in a gang war over control of the Eastmans. However, upon being informed by local saloonkeeper Ike the Plug to whom Morell had bragged "I'll fill that big Yid so full of holes he'll sink !", Zelig lured the unsuspecting assassin to a Second Avenue dance hall, the Stuyvesant Casino, where the Boys of the Avenue were holding an annual grand ball on December 1, 1911.

Morrell, who had become intoxicated while drinking at Ike the Plug's saloon, staggered in to the dance hall at around one o'clock and began yelling for Zelig as he walked onto the dance floor. Suddenly, the lights were turned off. When the lights came back on seconds later, Morrell had been shot and was lying dead on the dance floor.

Remaining in hiding for two weeks, Zelig was eventually arrested by detectives in New York's East Side but released shortly after. In 1912, Zelig himself was murdered while riding a trolley car.
