= McGurk's Suicide Hall =

Former saloon and dance hall in New York City

- Interactive map of the McGurk's Suicide Hall area
- Former names: McGurk's Saloon

General information
- Status: Demolished
- Type: Saloon, dance hall, brothel
- Location: Manhattan, New York, United States, 295 Bowery
- Coordinates: 40°43′29″N 73°59′32″W
- Opened: c. 1893
- Demolished: 2005
- Owner: John McGurk

McGurk's Suicide Hall was a notorious saloon, dance hall, and brothel at 295 Bowery in Manhattan, New York City. Operating in the 1890s and early 1900s, it catered to sailors, sex workers, and thrill-seeking visitors and became infamous after a cluster of suicides by young women in 1899, which led newspapers to dub it "Suicide Hall".

Owned by Irish immigrant saloonkeeper John H. McGurk, the hall became a symbol of the Bowery's late-19th-century vice district and has been described in later accounts of New York's underworld and working-class nightlife.

== History ==
=== Building and ownership ===
The building at 295 Bowery, between East Houston and First Street, was constructed in 1863 as a hotel that served soldiers returning from the American Civil War. By the 1890s the Bowery had shifted from a respectable commercial thoroughfare to a center of cheap lodging houses, dance halls, and saloons.

John McGurk, a Bowery saloonkeeper, opened a new bar there in 1893 under the name McGurk's Saloon. The business operated as a low-priced dance hall and brothel frequented by prostitutes and petty criminals. According to later accounts, McGurk employed a head bartender nicknamed "Short-Change Charley" Steele, reputed to drug customers with chloral hydrate so that they could be robbed, and hired former prizefighter "Eat-'Em-Up" Jack McManus as an armed bouncer.

Police raids were common. In one 1893 raid reported by The New York Times, agents found the saloon crowded with men and women of what the paper described as the lowest social strata, with indecency openly on display.

=== Suicides and notoriety ===
By the late 1890s McGurk's had acquired a reputation as one of the roughest dives on the Bowery, drawing both impoverished local residents and middle-class visitors curious about the district's nightlife. In 1899 a series of suicides by prostitutes associated with the saloon attracted sustained press coverage. Contemporary reports and later summaries often cite six completed suicides and seven attempts that year alone, most involving the ingestion of carbolic acid or leaps from the building's upper stories.

Among the most frequently retold episodes is the double suicide attempt by "Blonde Madge" Davenport and her companion "Big Mame," who bought carbolic acid together with the intention of ending their lives. Davenport died after drinking the poison, while Mame reportedly spilled much of it on her face and survived, badly disfigured and barred from the saloon. Their story, and others like it, were later recounted by historian Lucy Sante in her book Low Life: Lures and Snares of Old New York.

Rather than distancing himself from the tragedies, McGurk capitalized on the notoriety by rebranding the establishment as "McGurk's Suicide Hall". The nickname caught on in newspaper coverage and popular speech and has remained associated with the building in later historical works.

=== Proprietor John McGurk ===
John H. McGurk was a Bowery saloonkeeper who had already operated several dives before opening his establishment at 295 Bowery. Contemporary and later accounts describe McGurk's Suicide Hall as the latest in a series of saloons he ran that were repeatedly closed by the police, and as one of the most degraded resorts on the Bowery.

McGurk and his premises attracted early attention from reformers and the press for admitting minors and operating what authorities described as a disorderly house. In 1893 agents of the New York Society for the Prevention of Cruelty to Children raided one of his Bowery saloons and arrested him after finding fifteen-year-old Mary Ormsby on the premises while liquor was being served, an incident reported at the time by The New York Times and frequently cited in later histories. He was repeatedly charged with keeping a disorderly house and with running dives that served as concert saloons, brothels, and election "colonizing" centers, where transient lodgers were registered to vote in local races.

According to a later retelling based on contemporary newspaper coverage, McGurk lived far from the Bowery itself, in a respectable Gramercy Park brownstone with his wife Louisa and their daughter, while owning several other Raines law saloons, including the Oxford Hotel at 303 Bowery. His notoriety increased when a teenage sex worker, Emma Hartig, testified before an investigative committee about conditions at the hall and the role of local police and politicians, placing McGurk's at the center of wider debates over vice and corruption.

By 1901–1902, under mounting pressure from reformers and from Captain James "Terror of the Tenderloin" Churchill of the nearby police precinct, McGurk was again arrested on charges of running a disorderly house. He claimed to be a "nervous invalid" and asked for time to dispose of his lease, but instead forfeited a reported $1,000 bail and left New York, taking his wife and daughter to California with what one account describes as roughly half a million dollars in cash.

McGurk settled with his family in the temperance-minded city of Riverside, California, where he lived in relative comfort until his death from a heart attack in 1913, aged about 59. A detail repeated in later histories, drawn from Lucy Sante's Low Life, holds that his daughter was refused admission to a convent school when the nuns learned who her father was.

=== Closure and later uses ===
At the turn of the 20th century McGurk's operations drew increasing attention from reformers, City Hall, and the police, including Police Commissioner Theodore Roosevelt. McGurk and his employees faced multiple charges related to prostitution, assault, election fraud, and theft, and the saloon continued to be raided by the authorities.

In 1901 a new precinct captain prioritized closing so-called disorderly houses, and the police moved to shut down the hall. The saloon ceased operating as "Suicide Hall" in 1902, and the premises were converted into the Liberty Hotel, a cheap lodging house serving a similar clientele of transient men.

== Later history of the building ==
The building at 295 Bowery survived long after the saloon closed. In the mid-20th century it continued to function as a low-cost hotel. Beginning in the 1960s, a cooperative of women artists, including writer and activist Kate Millett, converted the upper floors into live-work lofts at a time when the Bowery still retained many of its older tenements and flophouses.

By the late 1990s and early 2000s, rising property values brought pressure to redevelop the site. Preservation groups and tenants sought landmark protection, arguing that the former Suicide Hall was a rare surviving building associated with the Bowery's working-class and vice history, but the Landmarks Preservation Commission declined designation, citing insufficient architectural or cultural merit.

The building was demolished in 2005. A large mixed-use residential complex, Avalon Bowery Place, now occupies the site. The Bowery Alliance of Neighbors and City Lore have since included McGurk's Suicide Hall in their "Reawakening the Bowery" series of sidewalk plaques and walking tours commemorating the street's layered history.

== Legacy ==
McGurk's Suicide Hall has been cited by historians and journalists as an emblematic example of the Bowery's late-19th-century dive-bar culture and of the precarious lives of sex workers in that era. The saloon appears in studies of New York's criminal underworld and gang life, and in popular histories of the Bowery's entertainment district.

The wave of suicides associated with the hall inspired contemporary and later literary treatments. Journalist Langdon Smith wrote the poem "Bessie McCall of Suicide Hall" about a fictional dance-hall girl, and the building has been referenced in memoirs and reminiscences of the neighborhood. Modern visual artists, writers, and local historians have continued to use the site as a symbol of the Bowery's transformation from impoverished skid row to gentrified streetscape.

== See also ==
- Bowery
- Five Points Gang
- Jack McManus (gangster)
- Theodore Roosevelt as New York City Police Commissioner
