= Louis Poggi =

Louis Poggi may refer to:

- Louis Pioggi (1889–1969), New York criminal and member of the Five Points Gang
- Louis Poggi (footballer) (born 1984), French footballer
