= Bottler =

Bottler may refer to:

- The Bottler (died 1908), pseudonym of gambler and underworld figure in New York
- Seven-Up Bottlers, or Pepsi Mega Bottlers, former names of the basketball team TNT KaTropa
- Sunkist Orange Bottlers, or Pop Cola Bottlers, former names of the basketball team Pop Cola Panthers
- Bottling company, a company bottles beverages
- A truck type with roll-up side doors specifically designed to bottles and tanks
- A character created by Irish stand-up comedian Brendan Grace
- A British term for the person who collects money at a street performance
- A type of water disruptor for explosive disposal; see Bomb disposal

== See also ==
- Bottle (disambiguation)
