= Yakey Yakes =

New York City street gang

The Yakey Yakes was a 19th-century street gang, prominent in New York's underworld during the late 1890s and early 1900s. Based in the neighborhood of Catherine and Madison Streets, the gang were formed by Yakey Yake Brady in the 1890s and later participated in the gang war between Monk Eastman and Paul Kelly.

Rivals of the Cherry Hill Gang, eight members were arrested in connection with the murder of rival Jimmy Brennan on the night of January 11, 1905. One of the gang members, Thomas "Nine-Eyed" Donegan, later admitted to have taken part in Brennan's murder, shooting him three times. However, members Robert Ginan and John Dalton ("Kid" or "Brady") were held in custody while the others were released under subpoenas. Two others thought to be involved included Edward Lynch, who was found earlier that night with a gunshot wound in the leg, and John Sullivan, arrested in Jersey City for carrying a loaded revolver also suffering from a gunshot wound which had shattered his jaw.

Oak Hill police initially charged William Budd and James Galligan, who an eyewitness identified, ambushing Brennan at Catherine and Madison Street and killing him.
