= Jack Sirocco =

American gangster

Jack Sirocco (1882–1954) was a New York City gangster involved in labor racketeering and strikebreaking. Originally a lieutenant in Paul Kelly's Five Points Gang, where he was the immediate boss of Johnny Torrio, Sirocco defected to the rival Eastman Gang, which he led in its last days.

== Biography ==
Sirocco, known as the main rival of gangster "Dopey" Benny Fein, was an early member of the Five Points Gang, but later defected to the Monk Eastman Gang during the gang war in the mid-1900s. Sirocco remained with the gang as manager of the Pearl House dance hall with Johnny Torrio and the satellite James Street Gang, until 1911 when he and Chick Tricker left wounded Eastman leader Jack Zelig behind during a failed robbery. Attempting to gain control of the gang both he and Tricker refused to post bail for Zelig. However, due to Zelig's political connections, the charges against him were later dropped. Upon Zelig's release Sirocco and Tricker planned Zelig's death, sending Eastman member Jules Morrello (or Julie Morrell) to murder Zelig. Zelig, however, was informed of the attempt by Ike the Plug and killed Morrello during a party at the Stuyvesant Casino Hall on December 2, 1911.

This would begin a civil war between the two Eastman factions that would last for nearly a year until Zelig's death in 1912. Sirocco and Tricker tried to lead the Eastman Gang after Monk Eastman briefly returned to lead the Eastmans, but by that time the civil war had destroyed what was left of the gang.

Sirocco later formed another gang, hiring out to strikebreakers and labor sluggers, competing with rival "Dopey" Benny Fein as the two struggled for control of labor slugging in New York's East Side during the early 1910s. In November 1913 the two gangs clashed as Sirocco's gang, hired by the Feldman Hat Company as strikebreakers against union workers protected by Benny Fein's gang, quickly escalated into a major gunfight in which Fein lieutenant Max Greenwalt was killed (most likely by Sirocco member Red Murray although other sources state that Greenwalt was killed by Johnnie Dike in a gunfight on Broome Street).

Benny Fein planned an ambush to eliminate the Sirocco gang as they were attending a local dance at Arlington Hall on January 9, 1914. However the ambush turned into a major battle lasting several hours and, while neither gang suffered any casualties, Deputy Court Clerk Frederick Strauss, apparently investigating the battle, was killed in the crossfire. In the ensuing scandal and the police crackdown, Sirocco disappeared from New York's underworld soon after the incident.
