= Richie Fitzpatrick =

American mobster

Richard Fitzpatrick (1871 – November 1, 1904) was a top gunman in the Monk Eastman gang in New York City. He had defected from the Five Points Gang in the early 1900s; he was active during the late 1890s until his murder in 1904.

Fitzpatrick had joined the Five Points Gang under Paul Kelly (born Paolo Antonio Vaccarelli) in the late 1890s. During the Kelly-Eastman gang war in 1903, Fitzpatrick defected to the Eastman Gang, along with "Kid Twist" Max Zwerbach; they both became top lieutenants. After Monk Eastman was arrested and imprisoned in 1904, Fitzpatrick and Zwerbach began fighting over leadership of the Eastman gang, eventually splitting the gang into separate factions.

On November 1, 1904, while attending a peace conference at a Sheriff Street saloon in the New York Chrystie Street neighborhood, Fitzpatrick was shot to death before the peace talks began. His killer was suspected of being Harris Dahl, aka Kid Dahl, friend of arch-rival Kid Twist. Several weeks later, "Kid Twist" lieutenant Vach "Cyclone Louie" Lewis led an attack that resulted in the murders of the remainder of the Fitzpatrick faction.

== Popular culture ==
Fitzpatrick was said to use a strategy of ambushing opponents by setting up meetings and claiming to be ready to turn against his leader. After being searched, he would excuse himself to use the restroom, where he had stashed a gun. Returning to the main room, he would kill his opponent. Such a tactic was used by Al Pacino's character Michael Corleone in The Godfather.
