= Langdon Smith =

American poet

Langdon Smith (4 January 1858 – 8 April 1908) was an American journalist and writer. His most well-known work is the poem "Evolution", which begins with the line "When you were a tadpole and I was a fish". The line later became the title of an essay about this "one-poem poet" written by Martin Gardner.

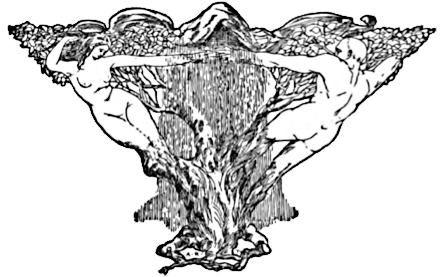
Frontispiece to "Evolution" in Evolution. A Fantasy (1909)

== Biography ==
According to Lewis Allen Brown's 1909 biographical sketch of Smith,

Langdon Smith was born in Kentucky Jan. 4, 1858 ... In boyhood he served in the Comanche and Apache wars as a trooper, his letters descriptive of these campaigns winning him his first newspaper position. Later he acted as a war correspondent during the extended fighting with the Sioux tribes.

Martin Gardner, who consulted Who's Who In America 1906–07 adds that Smith went to school in Louisville, Kentucky, 1864–1872.

On February 12, 1894 Smith married Marie Antionette Wright, described as "a Louisville girl" and soon after went to Cuba, reporting for the New York Herald on the guerilla operations of Antonio Maceo Grajales. He later returned to Cuba, at the outbreak of the Spanish–American War (1898), reporting for the New York Journal. According to Lewis Allen Brown,

One of the first at the front, he was present at all the principal engagements, taking high rank as a war correspondent.

== Reporting ==
In October 1897 Smith, along with fellow sports reporter Danny Smith, was sent by the New York Herald to Carson City, Nevada, where he covered the boxing match between James J. Corbett and English boxer Bob Fitzsimmons.

Smith continued reporting for William Randolph Hearst's Journal after the war. He was involved in at least one "scoop" for which Hearst papers became notorious, delivering the first newspaper copy of the 20th century to President McKinley. According to historian W. Joseph Campbell,

"Ten seconds into the century, the first issue of the New York Journal of 1 January 1901 fell from the newspaper's complex of fourteen high-speed presses. The first issue was rushed by automobile across pavements slippery with mud and rain to a waiting express train, reserved especially for the occasion. The newspaper was folded into an engraved silver case and carried aboard by Langdon Smith, a young reporter known for his vivid prose style. At speeds that reached eighty miles an hour, the special train raced through the darkness to Washington, D.C., and Smith's rendezvous with the president, William McKinley."

In the early years of the century he wrote for the New York Evening World as a featured writer, identified by his byline. Judging from the articles he published, he seems to have begun as a featured sports writer, with such articles as "Cock Fight Draws Out Millionaires" Beginning about 1904 his byline begins to appear frequently in the Sunday World and Sunday World Magazine on investigative articles such as "New York's Smiling Army of Factory Girls", "A Night With a Tenderloin 'Cop'", "A Day in the Hotel Astor Kitchen".

Although Smith's most famous work is the poem "Evolution", according to Brown, Smith also wrote short stories, and a novel, On the Pan Handle, that were well received at the time. Gardner was unable to verify any of this and doubts the novel and poems existed, except perhaps for a single poem, "Bessie McCall of Suicide Hall", which was reprinted in a 1907 issue of "Pandex of the Press". "Bessie McCall" was mentioned in an article on Smith in The New York American of April 21, 1939 by one Hype Igoe. "Suicide Hall" referred to a saloon at 295 Bowery run by John H. McGurk from 1895 to 1902, when suicides by young prostitutes there forced him out of business. The building that had housed "McGurk's Suicide Hall" was not demolished until 2005. The complete text of "Bessie McCall" is available on WikiSource.

The first few stanzas of the poem "Evolution" were written and published in the New York Herald in 1895. It was worked upon for many years and later published in full in the New York Journal sometime before 1906, and posthumously published in illustrated and annotated book form as Evolution : A Fantasy (1909).

== Death and wife's suicide ==
Smith died at his home, 148 Midwood Street, Flatbush, New York on 8 April 1908.

His grief-stricken wife committed suicide on June 10 of the same year after having tried to do so on April 25. Lewis Allen Browne in his preface to Evolution : A Fantasy (1909) wrote:

"Their lives and affections linked as they were, in his poetic fancy at least, since the beginning of time seemed to have created between them in reality a bond too close to survive a parting."

== Evolution ==
Aside from his journalism Smith's only known work is the romantic poem "Evolution", sometimes sub-titled or mistakenly called "A Tadpole and a Fish". The poem became very popular even before his death. It has been reprinted many times since.

In his biographical sketch of Smith Lewis Allen Brown describes it as follows:

"… it is as the author of Evolution that he is best remembered. Skilled as a war correspondent, himself a veteran Indian fighter, a technical writer of sports, possessed of a mentality too great to be handicapped through lack of university training, he thought for himself upon life and death, of the past and future, and in Evolution voiced his beliefs."

Brown described how Evolution was composed:

"The first few stanzas of Evolution were written in 1895 and published in the New York Herald where he was then employed. Four years later, when a member of the New York Journal staff, he wrote several more. These he laid aside for a while and then, from time to time, added a stanza until it was completed. Whether the editorial department failed to appreciate the poem, or the foreman of the composing room needed something with which to fill out a page is not known, but Evolution first appeared in its entirety in the center of a page of want advertisements in the New York Journal."

"A work of such merit, however, could not be lost. Mr. Smith received thousands of congratulatory letters from all parts of the world, accompanied by requests for copies of the poem which were exceedingly difficult to secure until reprinted in April, 1906, in The Scrap Book, edited by Mr. Frank A. Munsey."

Gardner claims to have located the precise issue of The New York Herald in which Evolution was first published: that of September 22, 1895. He also notes that Brown's information was taken from the Who's Who In America 1906-1907 article and an obituary published in The New York American on April 9, 1908, page 6, and that Brown does not add any new information to these sources.

According to a statement in The New York Times Book Review of July 23, 1910 it was "printed in full and illustrated in The Scrap Book of June 1909." Tributes to him on his death invariably emphasize the poem. According to a notice in the Ocala (Florida) Evening Star of April 17, 1908:

"Langdon Smith, the war correspondent and writer, died on Wednesday, at his home in Brooklyn, New York. No New York newspaper man was better known than Smith, who could describe, equally well, a battle or a baseball game, says the New York Post. But the thing that he wrote which will live the longest -- because it is worth while—is his poem "Evolution," which has been reprinted all over the country."

Evolution is reprinted, with hyperlinks and comments, on the Wikiquote page devoted to the poem and to Smith.
