= Vach Lewis =

American mobster

Vach "Cyclone Louie" Lewis (died May 14, 1908) was an early New York gangster and member of the Eastman Gang under Max "Kid Twist" Zwerbach.

== Biography ==
Lewis was a wrestler, strongman, and bodyguard; supposedly wrapping iron bars around his neck and arms, at Coney Island side shows before joining the Eastman Gang. Following Monk Eastman's imprisonment, he sided with Zwerbach during the struggle for leadership of the gang and, after the murder of rival Richie Fitzpatrick in 1904, eliminated the remaining members of the Fitzpatrick faction.

As a bodyguard, Lewis became Zwerbach's right-hand man during the next four years and was involved in the murder of a gambler known as "The Bottler", a member of the Five Points Gang who operated stuss games on Suffolk Street, shooting him twice in the chest in full view of twenty people.

Trouble continued between the Eastmans and the Five Points Gang until May 14, 1908, when Lewis and Zwerbach got into a fight with Louis "The Lump" Pioggi, a member of the Five Points Gang, over his former girlfriend and dance hall girl Carroll Terry and eventually forced Pioggi to jump out the second story window of a Manhattan bar breaking his ankle.

Pioggi returned to gang leader Paul Kelly, and the two plotted the murder of their rivals. Later that night, with several other gang members, Lewis and Zwerbach were ambushed while leaving a Coney Island bar and gunned down, with Zwerbach shot once in the head and Lewis five times in the head and chest.
