= Ettore Zappi =

American mobster (1904–1986)

- Born: July 4, 1904; Naples, Campania, Italy
- Died: July 1986 (aged 81–82); Hollywood, Florida, U.S.
- Other name: "Terry Z"
- Occupation: Mobster
- Allegiance: Gambino crime family

Ettore Zappi (July 4, 1904 – July 1986), a.k.a. Anthony Russo, was an Italian-American mobster in the Gambino crime family who rose to the position of capo.

Born in Naples, Campania, on July 4, 1904, Zappi was a cousin of Carlo Gambino. After immigrating to New York City, he became a member of what would become the Gambino crime family, and was promoted to the position of caporegime after Gambino became boss of the family in 1957. Initially active primarily in loansharking and bookmaking rackets, Zappi later became involved in the Gambino family's pornography operations, financing pornographic films, peep shows, and strip club. At the birth of the pornography business in California, Zappi sent a protégé of his, William Haimowitz, to Los Angeles to enquire into investment potential and to corner the pornography market for the Gambino family. Haimowitz would establish contacts in the Los Angeles crime family, principally through Aladena "Jimmy the Weasel" Fratianno. Zappi allegedly provided partial financial backing of the film Deep Throat, along with members and associates of the Colombo crime family, including Joseph Peraino and John "Sonny" Franzese.

He died at his home in Hollywood, Florida after a long illness.
