= Humpty Jackson =

New York City gang boss

- A photo of Humpty Jackson, from Herbert Asbury's book The Gangs of New York
- Occupation: Gang leader
- Convictions: Grand larceny, assault

Thomas "Humpty" Jackson (1879 – 1951) was a New York criminal and last of the independent gang leaders in New York's underworld during the early twentieth century. Reportedly well read, Jackson was said to be an admirer of such writers such as Voltaire, Charles Darwin, Leonard Huxley and Herbert Spencer as well as various Greek and Latin texts. He was, however, known to be a violent man who regularly carried three revolvers, including one in his derby hat and another secreted in a strange-looking small sweaty holster under his hunchback.

== Biography ==
He was born in the Manhattan Gas House District in November 1879 to Irish immigrant parents. Although little is known of his early life, Jackson uncommonly possessed an educational background despite his reputation as a ruthless criminal whose gang numbering fifty men included street thugs such as Spanish Louie, Nigger Ruhl, the Lobster Kid, and a six-foot-tall killer known as "The Grabber".

=== Criminal activities ===
Based in an old graveyard located between First and Avenue A (Manhattan)bound by 12th and [ 11th Street (Manhattan) in Manhattan, Jackson was said to give out assignments from blackjacking to murder for hire to his followers while sitting atop a tombstone. Although involved in organizing and planning, specifically armed robberies, burglaries and looting of warehouses, Jackson rarely participated in the criminal activities. However, on the evening of May 21, 1900, Jackson stabbed New York City policeman William J. Tynan five times. Tynan and his partner had been looking for Jackson because he was suspected of having stolen a gold watch and chain. The two policemen managed to arrest Jackson despite Tynan's having been stabbed. In 1902, Jackson fired four shots at Detective Edward Reardon, for which he served 30 months in Sing Sing. Reardon arrested Jackson again in May 1907 for robbing young women. At his arraignment, Jackson complained to the magistrate that he was being hounded by the detective, stating that "Reardon is dead sore on me and gave me my bit. My only crime is that I'm popular." As of 1905, the Humpty Jackson Gang was considered among the "big four", along with the Cherry Hill and Five Points Gangs, which dominated the Lower East Side.

Jackson once boasted in court that he'd been arrested "over 100 times." At least four of these arrests resulted in convictions. In January 1909, he was arrested for grand larceny, pleaded guilty to avoid a life sentence as a habitual offender, and was sentenced to four and a half years imprisonment.

=== Later life ===
Released from Dannemora in 1912, he left the criminal underworld and began a small business. In 1932, while living in retirement as a pet store owner in East Harlem, he was interviewed by Collier's Weekly, in which he was referred to as the one-time "King of New York gangsters", as well as the New York Times three years later.
