= Batavia Street Gang =

Batavia Street Gang was a New York independent street gang based in the Fourth Ward during the 1890s. Affiliated with the Eastman Gang during the turn of the 20th century, they were rivals of the Cherry Hill Gang throughout the previous decade. During one incident, five members of the gang were arrested for breaking into Seigel's jewelry store in order to purchase costumes for the Sullivan ball at New Irving Hall in an attempt to out do their rivals, who were known to be "dandies", and had announced they would be attending in extravagant evening clothes.

Stealing a gold watch from Seigel's jewelry store, Duck Reardon and Mike Walsh organized a raffle with the Sullivan Association at Coyne's saloon and, arranging it so that fellow gang member James Leary would win the watch. However, as neither the income from the raffle, nor the watch raised enough money to purchase suits for the other gang members, their leader Duck Reardon, and several others, smashed in the front window of a local jewelry store and stole 44 gold rings ranging from $3–$45 in value.

After reporting the robbery to police, detectives from the Oak Street Police Station arrested several members of the Sullivan Association including Reardon, Arthur Hassett, George and Jerry Leary and Chuck Conners (not related to the ward boss of the Bowery and Chinatown), as well as tug boat hand Mike Walsh, who had purchased one of the stolen rings from Reardon (reportedly while they were trying on suits at a local Division Street tailor shop).

Held at the Center Street Police Court, the five were tried before a Magistrate Cornell who ordered Reardon, Hassett, Connors and Walsh to pay $1,000 while George Leary was charged $300 for stealing the gold watch. However, no charges were brought against Jerry Leary and he was later released.
