= William Oberhardt =

American painter (1882–1958)

- Born: 1882; Guttenberg, New Jersey, U.S.
- Died: 1958 (aged 75–76)
- Education: National Academy of Design; Academy of Fine Arts, Munich
- Occupations: Artist; portrait painter; illustrator; sculptor

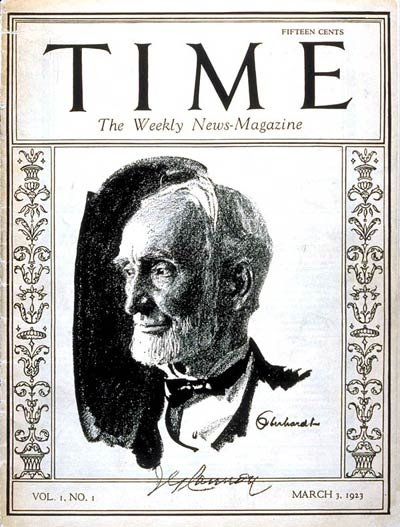
Oberhardt's illustration for the first issue of Time

William Oberhardt (1882–1958) was an American artist, portrait painter, illustrator and sculptor. His illustration of Joseph Gurney Cannon, Speaker of the United States House of Representatives, appeared on the cover of the first edition of Time magazine on 3 March 1923.

Oberhardt was born in Guttenberg, New Jersey and studied at the National Academy of Design from 1897 to 1900, and then studied in Munich with Carl von Marr at the Munich Academy of Fine Arts. He painted formal portraits in oil, but charcoal, crayons and lithographic crayon were his favorite mediums. He was notable for his ability to capture and reveal the character of his sitters. He worked most of his career in New York City and lived in North Pelham, New York.

In the 1920s and 1930s, Oberhardt was among the best-known and most popular illustrators in the U.S. He portrayed impoverished immigrants, pushcart peddlers, child laborers and the Manhattan skyline for The East Side magazine, which Zoe Anderson Norris (1860-1914) published bimonthly starting in 1909. Among his formal portrait subjects were Presidents William H. Taft, Warren G. Harding and Herbert Hoover; the inventor Thomas Edison, the writer Ameen Rihani and the composer Sergei Rachmaninoff.

His portrait of Uncle Joe Cannon (Speaker of the House) from Time was placed on the top of the 1939 World's Fair Time Capsule, to be opened in 2039. Subsequently, he also drew President Harding for "Time". Additionally, he was well known for his advertising work and patriotic and recruiting posters in both world wars.
