= Jack Zelig =

American gangster (1888–1912)

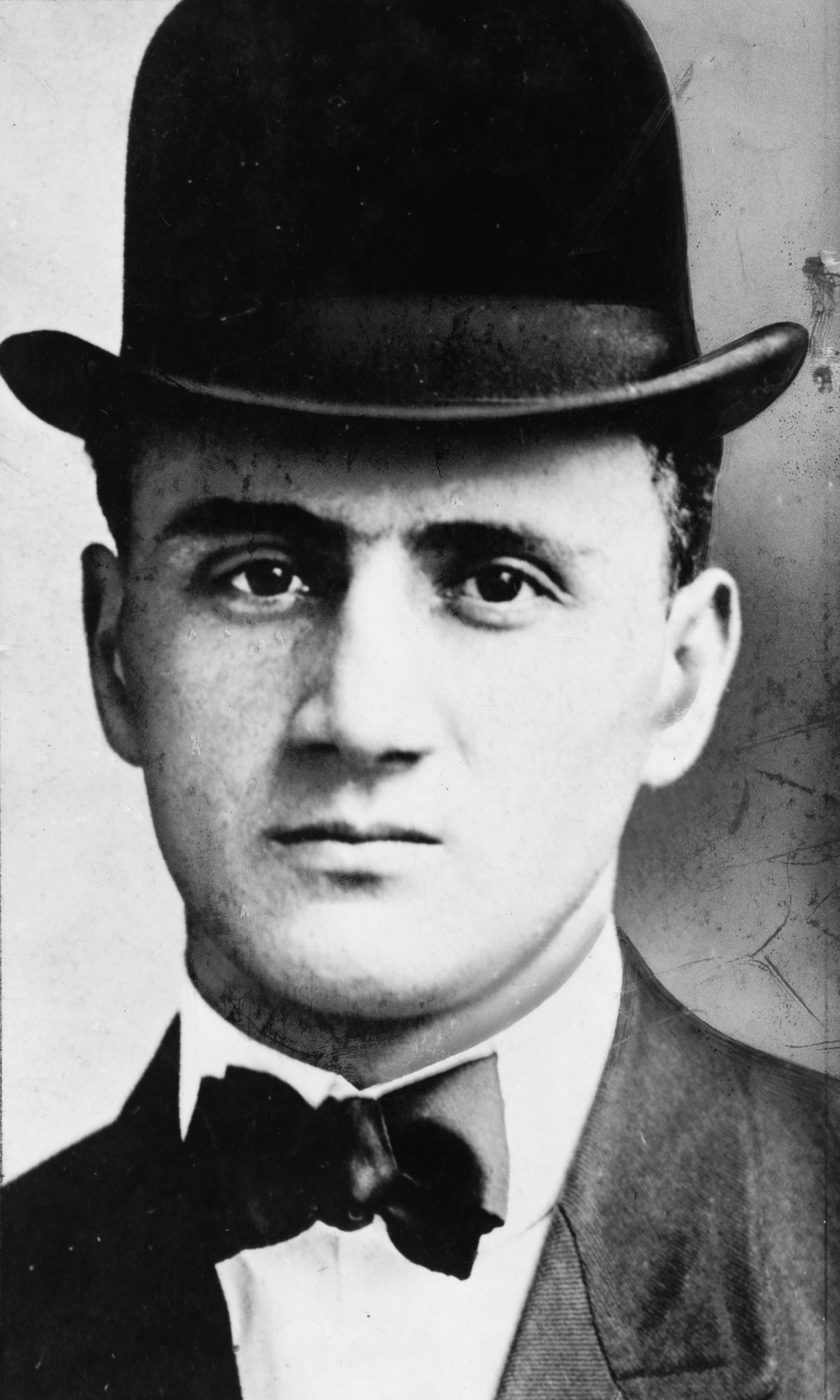
- Born: Zelig Harry Lefkowitz; May 13, 1888; New York City, U.S.
- Died: October 5, 1912 (aged 24); New York City, U.S.
- Cause of death: Gunshot
- Resting place: Washington Cemetery
- Other name: Big Jack
- Height: 6 ft 0 in (183 cm)
- Spouse: Henrietta Lefkowitz

Jack "Big" Zelig (May 13, 1888 – October 5, 1912) was an American gangster and one of the last leaders of the Eastman Gang.

== Biography ==
Born Zelig Zvi Lefkowitz on the Lower East Side of Manhattan in New York City, New York, Zelig was a well-known pickpocket and thief by age 6. He was a member of Crazy Butch's pickpocket gang before joining the Eastman Gang in the late 1890s.

Rising up the ranks, Zelig sought control over the fragmented Eastman Gang in 1908, after "Kid Twist" (Max Zwerbach) was murdered by a rival. Zelig's crew had more than 75 members, including satellite gangs such as the Lenox Avenue Gang in Harlem, led by "Gyp the Blood" (aka Harry Horowitz). During this period, when ethnic Jewish gangsters became predominant in the gang, Zelig was also known as "The Big Yid".

=== Feud with Sirocco and Tricker ===
After Zelig was arrested in 1911 for robbing a brothel, Jack Sirocco and "Chick" Tricker attempted to gain leadership of the gang by refusing to bail out their boss. Zelig was later released due to his political connections. One of his men told him that Sirocco and Tricker were planning on murdering him. The assassin, a gunman named Julie Morrell, was lured by Zelig to The Stuyvesant Casino where he was killed by the gang leader on December 2, 1911. (That building at 140 Second Avenue is now used as the Ukrainian National Home.)

The next year, the longstanding Eastman/Five Points feud flared anew. As Zelig left the Criminal Courts building on June 3, 1912, he was shot through the neck by Five Points gunman Charley Torti. He was a known associate of Louis Pioggi, aka Louie the Lump, who had murdered Zelig's mentor, Kid Twist Zwerbach, four years earlier. Zelig had been released on $1000 bail after his arrest for "shooting up the saloon" of Pioggi's brother Jake. Zelig recovered from his wound in time to be dragged into the Becker/Rosenthal case.

=== Final years ===
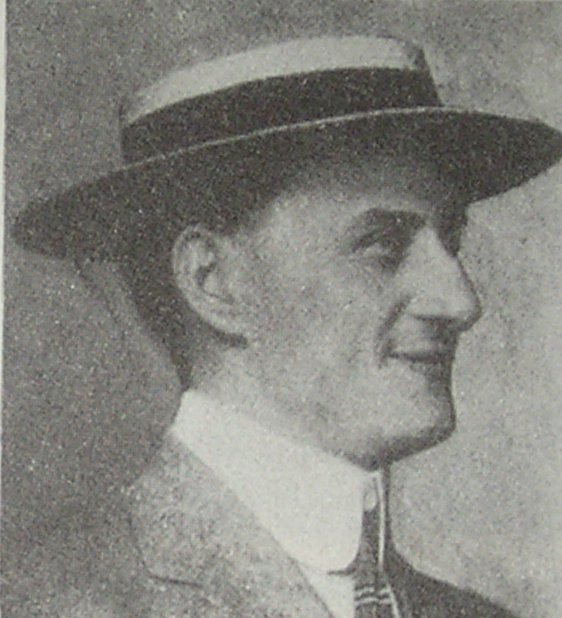

Charles Becker, a corrupt NYPD lieutenant, was reported by New York World as one of three corrupt police officers involved in the affairs of Herman Rosenthal. This small-time bookmaker had complained to the press that his illegal businesses had been badly damaged by the greed of the city's corrupt police officers.

Becker allegedly told Jack Rose that he wanted Zelig and members of the Lenox Avenue Gang, specifically, Harry "Gyp the Blood" Horowitz, Jacob "Whitey Lewis" Seidenshner, Louis "Lefty Louie" Rosenberg, and Francesco "Dago Frank" Cirofisi, to 'croak' Rosenthal.

Zelig refused, so Rose waited until he was in Boston before moving in. Herman Rosenthal was gunned down in front of the Hotel Metropole in Times Square on July 16, 1912, two days after his story appeared in the newspapers. In the aftermath, District Attorney Charles S. Whitman made no secret of his belief that the gangsters who killed him had committed the murder at Becker's behest.

The fall-out from the Rosenthal murder was huge, making national headlines. All of Big Jack's henchmen were rounded up and charged with murder. Zelig, furious at Rose going behind his back, informed Becker's defense that he would testify for them.

=== Death ===
The day before he could do so, on October 5, 1912, Zelig was shot behind the ear and killed by "Boston Red" Phil Davidson (of 111 E. 7th Street) while riding on a 2nd Avenue trolley car while passing East 13th Street. Zelig was hanging out at Segal's Cafe (76 Second Avenue, now a church), when he received an anonymous phone call requesting his presence on 14th street. Zelig jumped on the uptown trolley; when he stood up at the intersection of 13th street, Davidson approached him and fatally shot Zelig in the back of the head with a police revolver. Zelig was 24 years old. Davidson ran East on 14th Street where he ran into a police officer on beat patrol who made him drop his weapon.

Davidson claimed he had shot Zelig over a $400 grudge, but it was popularly believed he had been killed to keep him from testifying against Charles Becker in the Rosenthal murder case involving the Lenox Avenue Gang.

According to his family which included his parents, sister Annie Alberts of Patterson New Jersey, and wife Henrietta, Zelig's real name was Zelig H. Alberts. His wife also stated that he worked as a diamond cutter.

== Legacy ==
Crowds of people attended Zelig's funeral. At the time only the funeral of a popular Rabbi had a higher attendance.

Shortly after Zelig's death New York detective Abe Shoenfeld wrote "Jack Zelig is as dead as a door nail. Men before him – like Kid Twist, Monk Eastman, and others – were as pygmies to a giant. With the passing of Zelig, one of the most 'nerviest', strongest, and best men of his kind left us."
