= Cherry Hill Gang =

1890s street gang in New York City

The Cherry Hill Gang was a New York street gang during the late nineteenth century.

Formed in the 1890s, the Cherry Hill Gang were known as the "dandies" of New York's underworld. Often wearing dress suits and armed with metal-weighted walking sticks, gang members were able to attack and rob wealthier victims surprising those who would have been suspicious of other poorer gangs of the period.

Throughout the decade, rival gangs would attempt to compete with the gang's success. One incident in particular occurred when, after the Batavia Street Gang announced hosting a party at New Irving Hall, the Cherry Hillers planned to arrive in expensive wardrobe. Not to be outdone, as hosts of the party, the Batavia Street Gang robbed Segal's Jewelry Store on New Chambers Street of 44 gold rings. The following morning however, shortly after selling the rings at a local pawn shop, over a dozen gang members were arrested by police while being fitted for suits at a tailors shop on Division Street, and spent that night in The Tombs while the Cherry Hill Gang and others attended the party.

By the early 20th century the Cherry Hill Gang was regarded as the most vicious gang in the city. Their main rivals were the Whyos, but they fought just as vigorously amongst each other. Many Cherry Hillers such as Yakey Yake Brady, Monk Eastman and Bill "The Brute" Sanger formed sub-gangs of their own and feuded constantly over turf and power.
