= Chick Tricker =

American gangster

Frank "Chick" Tricker
- Died: 1913
- Other name: Chick Tricker
- Occupations: Gangster; saloonkeeper
- Years active: 1900s–1910s
- Known for: Co-leader of the Eastman Gang in New York City

Frank "Chick" Tricker was an American gangster in New York who, as a member of the Eastman Gang, served as one of its last leaders alongside Jack Sirocco.

A longtime member of the Eastmans, Tricker made a name for himself as a Bowery and Park Row saloonkeeper who first came to prominence in a brawl with "Eat 'Em Up" Jack McManus, a former prizefighter and Bowery bouncer at McGurk's Suicide Hall. After insulting several dance hall girls at Paul Kelly's club New Brighton, McManus confronted Tricker at Third Avenue and Jones Street and shot him in the leg. While Tricker was recuperating in a local hospital, McManus was ambushed and killed by Sardinia Frank only a day later.

Tricker survived the gang wars of the last decade and became a prominent member under Eastman leader "Big" Jack Zelig, who was awarded control of one of the three factions of the Eastman gang. By 1910, Tricker headed his faction based at the former Stag Cafe on West 28th Street near Broadway, renaming it the Maryland Cafe. The club had a long history of violence as, only the previous year, three men had been killed in a dispute over a woman.

During the so-called "Ida the Goose War", several members of his gang were killed in a confrontation with the Gopher Gang when Ida the Goose was abducted by (or ran off with) a member of Tricker's gang. Leaving the gangs to settle the matter themselves, the Gophers eventually took her back to Hell's Kitchen after a brief gunfight in the Maryland Cafe left six members dead.

Following a failed armed robbery in 1911, Tricker and Sirocco left behind Zelig, who had been injured during the holdup, to be arrested. Instead of bailing him out, the two decided to assume control of the Eastmans. Zelig was eventually released in part to his political connections in Tammany Hall. A later attempt to murder Zelig failed when, after being informed by Ike the Plug, Zelig lured Eastman member and assassin Jules Morell into his club where he was killed .

By 1912, Tricker and Sirocco were using Little Rock's pool room, at 396 Broome Street, as their headquarters.
