= Louis Pioggi =

American gangster (1889–1969)

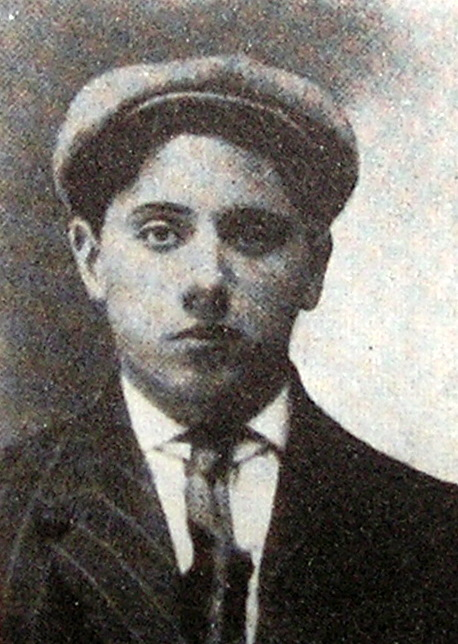
Louie the Lump

Louis "Louie the Lump" Pioggi (April 24, 1889 – May 15, 1969) was an American criminal and member of the Five Points Gang, known most prominently for the murder of Eastman Gang leader Max "Kid Twist" Zwerbach and Vach "Cyclone Louie" Lewis. He appears in newspaper accounts and public records as Louis Poggi.

== Life and crime ==
Although newspaper accounts report Pioggi (spelled Poggi) was employed as a clerk in a Coney Island hospital with no criminal record, Pioggi apparently became associated with members of the Five Points Gang during their decade-long gang war with the Eastman Gang.

On the night of May 14, 1908, Pioggi was confronted by Zwerbach and Vach Lewis over a Coney Island dance hall girl, Carrol Terry, and eventually forced to jump out the first-storey window of a saloon. After returning to rival Five Points Gang leader Paul Kelly, Pioggi returned to the saloon and lured the two into the street where they were ambushed by members of the Five Points Gang and gunned down.

During his trial, Pioggi claimed Zwerbach and Lewis had confronted him with members of their gang at his hotel with the intention of murdering him. Forced out into the street, he went on to say he then shot both before they were able to get out their pistols. His lawyer, John S. Bennett, issued a statement to the court that for the safety of his client, Pioggi would choose not to stand trial and pleaded guilty to manslaughter as his testimony might incriminate certain figures of the city's underworld. Bennett's claims were further supported by Edward Reardon, formerly of the District Attorney's office, and Thomas Fitzpatrick, brother of slain gangster Richie Fitzpatrick, but apparently neither man appeared at the trial.

Pioggi was later sentenced to one year at Elmira Reformatory, and following his release, he was charged with violation of the Sullivan Law in April 1912 and jumped bail. Shortly after this, one of Pioggi's friends, Charley Torti, was accused of shooting arch-rival Jack Zelig on the steps of the Tombs on Pioggi's orders in June 1912. On the run for three years, Pioggi was eventually arrested in Times Square by detectives of the District Attorney's office on July 28, 1915. At his arraignment, he was imprisoned in the Tombs without bail to await his trial.

His World War I draft registration card from June 1917 shows that Poggi, then living at 910 Jackson Avenue in the Bronx, was employed as a bartender at 8 Baxter Street in the employ of William Casazza.

In June 1923, Poggi and another man were arraigned for the shooting death of Charles Cassazza, in the Poggi's Cafe Royale at 8 Baxter Street.

Poggi's World War II draft registration card, from 1942, shows Poggi listed as an unemployed bartender, and residing at 333 Madison Street, with a mailing address of Manhattan State Hospital on Ward's Island.
