= Jack McManus (gangster) =

American boxer and gangster

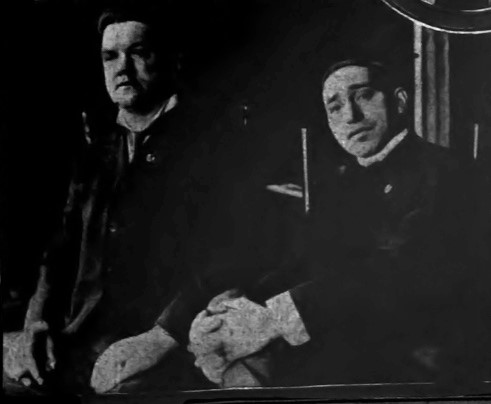
- Jack McManus (left) and Paul Kelly (right) at the Kelly's club "New Brighton"

Personal information
- Nationality: (United States) American
- Born: Thomas McManus; March 24, 1862 Boston, United States
- Died: May 26, 1905 (aged 43) Bowery, Manhattan, New York City, United States
- Occupation: Boxer

Boxing career

Jack McManus (born Thomas McManus, March 24, 1862 – May 26, 1905), also known as Eat 'Em Up, was a noted New York City gangster around the turn of the 20th century.

== Life ==
Born in Boston, he was considered one of the premier boxers of the underworld, rivaled only by Monk Eastman, McManus started off as a prize fighter only to begin work in as a bouncer in the dives of Lower Manhattan, including "Suicide Hall" and "New Brighton".

Eat 'Em Up Jack became known as the right-hand man of Paul Kelly, leader of the Five Points Gang. Always dressed in the finest clothes, McManus cut a fearsome figure around New York until May 1905, when he met his end after a brawl with gangster Chick Tricker. After shooting Tricker in a street brawl outside the New Brighton dance hall, Eat 'Em Up Jack was beaten to death in the Bowery by an underworld character known as Sardinia Frank, who crept up behind the gangster and bashed in his skull with a lead pipe.

== In popular culture ==
- Eat 'Em Up Jack McManus in a minor character in the 1994 novel The Alienist by Caleb Carr.

== See also ==
- List of bare-knuckle boxers
