= Eastman Gang =

New York based organized crime group

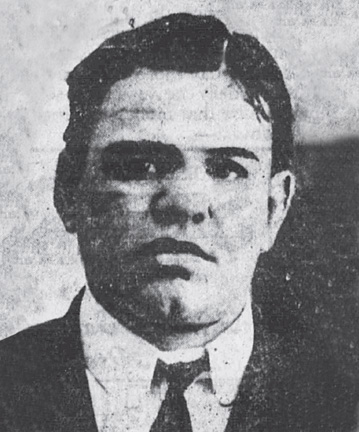
- Monk Eastman leader of the Eastman Gang from a New York Police Department mug shot, 1903
- Founded: 1890s
- Founded by: Monk Eastman
- Founding location: Lower East Side, Manhattan, New York
- Years active: 1890s–1910s
- Territory: Manhattan, New York
- Ethnicity: predominantly Jewish-American but also some Irish-Americans, Italian-Americans and English-Americans
- Criminal activities: Armed robbery, theft, illegal gambling, extortion, prostitution, and peddling opium
- Allies: Batavia Street Gang, Lenox Avenue Gang
- Rivals: Five Points Gang, Whyos, Yakey Yakes
- Notable members: Richie Fitzpatrick; Max "Kid Twist" Zwerbach; "Big" Jack Zelig; Jack Sirocco; Chick Tricker; Julie Morrell

The Eastman Gang was a predominantly Jewish-American street gang that dominated parts of the underworld in New York City during the late 1890s until the early 1910s. Along with the increasingly Italian-American and Italian immigrant Five Points Gang under Italian-American Paolo Antonio Vaccarelli, best known by his pseudonym Paul Kelly, the Eastman gang succeeded the long dominant Whyos as the first non-Irish street gang to gain prominence in the underworld during the 1890s. Its rise marked the beginning of a period of strong Jewish-American influence within organized crime in New York City.

Under the leadership of Monk Eastman, a well known bouncer and hired thug, the Eastman Gang spent the next decade establishing a criminal empire in Manhattan's Lower East Side through criminal activities, including prostitution and illegal gambling. They operated stuss games, and established strong political connections through Tammany Hall.

== Early years ==
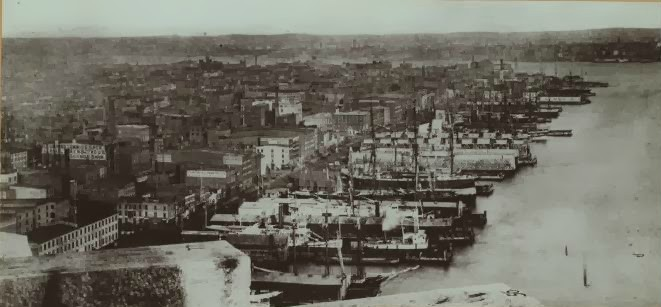
The Eastman Gang began in the early 1890s around Corlear's Hook, Lower East Side, New York City, in a photograph, circa 1876.

According to an article in the April 26, 1903, edition of the New York Daily Tribune, the gang that would become Eastman's first coalesced in the early 1890s. They started out in the notorious Corlear's Hook section of the Lower East Side on Rivington Street, in the vicinity of Mangin and Goerck streets. Another gang of the era, the Short Tails, had its headquarters in this same area, and the Eastman gang may have developed from that group. Originally composed of largely Irish and Italian Catholics from the local slums, the gang quickly became almost exclusively Jewish, as a wave of Jewish immigrants from eastern Europe settled into lower Manhattan and nearby Brooklyn.

When Monk Eastman entered the gang is unknown. His father abandoned his family when Eastman was five years old, and he lived with his mother and sisters in her father's household. Several newspaper articles refer to Eastman as from Corlear's Hook, so he was likely involved from this early era. His background was Yankee (Eastman immigrants came from England in the colonial period), but he originally had many ethnic Irish associates.

By the start of the 20th century, the gang had expanded beyond Corlear's Hook and changed its criminal focus from petty theft to pimping, using the many "disorderly houses" (brothels) along Allen Street to amass a small fortune. During this time the gang became known as the Allen Street Cadets ("cadet" being Bowery slang for a pimp); they adopted a flamboyant lifestyle. According to one local charity worker, "You never saw an Eastman without a woman." Aside from pimping they also kept their hand in other crimes, running gambling houses, peddling opium, and hiring themselves out as paid goons. One of the gang's "clubhouses" during this time was Silver Dollar Smith's saloon on Essex Street. Monk Eastman worked as a "sheriff" or bouncer there. He quickly became a favorite mercenary for the many Tammany Hall politicians and Wall Street big wigs who frequented the place. As Monk's fame grew, his gang came to be known simply as the Monk Eastmans or the Eastman gang.

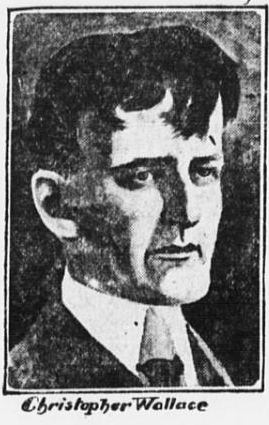
Gangster Christopher Wallace shortly after being arrested with Monk Eastman, 1904.

Like many gangs of the time, the Eastmans dressed as dandies; they were well-groomed men who liked to flaunt their wealth. According to Alfred Henry Lewis's 1912 book, The Apaches of New York, many of the gang members were also bicycle enthusiasts, likely owing to Eastman's own interest in the new riding machines. Lewis claims that Monk rented bicycles out of his Broome Street bird shop, and that an associate opened a club in Monk's honor called "The Squab Wheelman" (after the boss's twin passions—pigeons and bicycles).

Eventually, the gang became involved in rivalries with other local gangs such as the Yakey Yakes and the Five Points Gang, warring over both territory and work as political sluggers for Tammany Hall. The Eastmans dominated the gang war in the 20th century during the first year: his gang members rallied in pitched battles in the streets of New York reminiscent of the gangs of the previous century. Eastman was a charismatic leader, who often led his men into battle. He attracted many members of the Five Pointers to defect to the Eastmans, including Richie Fitzpatrick and Max "Kid Twist" Zwerbach. However, as the gang war began to escalate, Tammany politicians forced the leaders to agree to a truce before losing control of the situation.

== Reign of Kid Twist ==
After Monk Eastman was arrested in 1904 for a street mugging, the gang threatened to disintegrate among warring factions, each trying to assert control. By the end of the year, the gang was split between former Eastman lieutenants Max Zwerbach and Richie Fitzpatrick.

Threatened by civil war during their war with the Five Pointers, Zwerbach and Fitzpatrick agree to meet for a truce in late 1904. However, possibly while attending a peace conference, Fitzpatrick was found shot to death at a local neighborhood saloon near Sheriff-Chrystie Street on November 1, 1904.

With the elimination of the remaining members of the Fitzpatrick faction by Zwerbach lieutenant Vach "Cyclone Louie" Lewis several weeks later, "Kid Twist" Zwerbach took leadership of the Eastmans. He continued his war against the Five Points Gang on and off during his four-year reign. Paul Kelly arranged the murders of Zwerbach and Lewis, using an altercation with underling Louis "Louie the Lump" Pioggi to set them up for an ambush on May 14, 1908.

== Strikebreaking ==
In 1907, the professional strikebreaker Pearl Bergoff brought in the Eastman gang to ride herd over "scabs" brought in to break a longshoremen strike.

== Zelig and the final years ==
Following the murders of Zwerbach and Lewis, "Big" Jack Zelig took over what remained of the Eastmans. He divided the gang into three separate factions, with the other two operating as satellite gangs under saloonkeepers Jack Sirocco and Chick Tricker. These two eventually turned on Zelig, leaving him behind for police arrest after a failed armed robbery.

The two factions were involved in gun battles throughout the city during the next year. A failed attempt on Zelig's life at the hands of Julie Morrell resulted in the would-be assassin being killed in December 1911. Both Sirocco and Tricker assumed control of what was left of the Eastmans after Zelig was killed by "Red" Phil Davidson shortly before he could testify against NYPD Lieutenant Charles Becker on October 5, 1912, in a trial for the murder of Herman Rosenthal. After this what was left of the Eastmans began to crumble and the gang finally disintegrated.
