= Max Zwerbach =

American gangster (1884–1908)

Max Zweifach
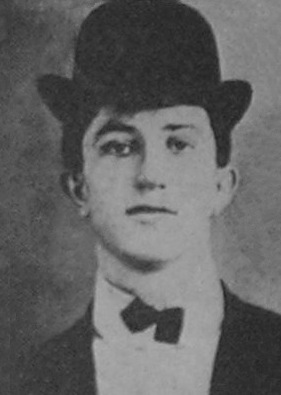
- Born: Maximillian Zweifach; March 14, 1884; Austro-Hungarian Empire
- Died: May 14, 1908 (aged 24); New York City, U.S.
- Other names: Kid Twist, Zwerbach
- Children: 1

Max Zweifach (born Maximillian Zweifach; March 14, 1884 – May 14, 1908) also known as "Kid Twist" and occasionally referred to as Zwerbach was an American gangster active in the early 1900s.

== Early life ==
Born Maximillian Zweifach in the Austro-Hungarian Empire on March 14, 1884, to Austrian-Jewish father Adolf and Italian mother Hanna. With his family, he emigrated to New York in 1886 to escape the antisemitic riots, settling right below the Williamsburg Bridge on Delancey Street. Although Zweifach's father had hoped he would join the family tailoring business, Zweifach proved otherwise and was a prominent young thief by his teenage years.

== Criminal career ==
Zweifach was first arrested on a charge of grand larceny in June 1899 on the suspicion of stealing a bicycle. When asked his occupation by the judge, Zweifach quipped, "Bicycles". Max pleaded guilty and was let off with a fine. Zweifach soon graduated into more serious offenses. Zweifach's right-hand man was his brother Daniel, aka Kid Slyfox. Both Zweifach brothers led some of their friends during Election Day 1902 rioting to support Republican politician Sam Koenig in the Sixteenth Assembly District.

By 1903, Max Zweifach had picked up the nickname of "Kid Twist" and was known as a dangerous and cunning gang leader. On August 17, 1903, Kid Twist was charged with killing a rival gangster named John "Mugsy" Bayard during an argument after a card game. Zweifach was discharged on the grounds of self-defense and soon attracted the attention of gang boss Monk Eastman.

When Eastman was locked up for robbery the next year, Kid Twist found himself at odds with his old pal Richie Fitzpatrick over the leadership of the gang. This feud came to a head on October 30, 1904, when Fitzpatrick shot and wounded one of Kid Twist's men, Thomas McCauley, in a saloon dispute. Two nights later, Twist invited his rival to a peace conference at a saloon at 77 Sheriff Street. The meeting devolved into an argument. Fitzpatrick, realizing he was about to be hit, rushed out of the place. One of Twist's men, Harris Stahl, gave chase and shot him to death. Stahl would be acquitted of Fitzpatrick's murder several months later.

Kid Twist concocted a scheme to bilk the New York Central Railroad out of thousands of dollars, by having the owners of a nearby print shop distribute $4,000 of fake ticket passes to the public through scalpers. Twist and his partners were arrested in the spring of 1905 and charged with forgery. Ultimately, no one was convicted.

During his heyday, Kid Twist's top men included his brother Kid Slyfox, Harris Stahl, Big Jack Zelig, Ike the Blood, and Samuel Pristrich, aka Cyclone Louie, a former wrestler and sideshow strongman who was famous for twisting iron bars around his arms and neck. Pristrich would later move in with Zweifach and his family at 255 Sackman Street in Brownsville.

Zweifach also began distributing his own brand of celery tonic to shopkeepers in his territory. The drink, packaged in bottles that bore his picture, was muscled in at exorbitant prices. Any store owner who refused to carry Kid Twist's celery tonic had his business trashed, or worse. Kid Twist also put the squeeze on illegal gambling games in his neighborhood. A case in point involved a Five Points gangster named Charles Greenwich, aka The Bottler, who operated a profitable stuss game on Suffolk Street. Kid Twist informed him in early 1907 that Harris Stahl was coming in as an equal partner in his game. Greenwich fumed but complied with this demand.

Some weeks later, Twist told Greenwich he was now out completely, and that another gangster named The Nailer would take the other half of the game. Greenwich barricaded the doors of his establishment and dared the Kid Twist gang to get him. On May 31, 1907, police interrupted an armed standoff between Greenwich and Stahl. Both men were taken into custody and fined $5. The next night, the two men ran into each other at Suffolk and Broome streets and went for their guns. Greenwich was shot to death.

=== Demise ===
Despite having a wife and child at his Brownsville home, Kid Twist was known as a ladies' man, and it was this that would prove the end of him. Zweifach's regular girlfriend was a Canadian dancer named Carroll Terry, who also was linked with Louis Pioggi aka Louie The Lump, an up-and-coming member of the Five Points Gang. Their romantic rivalry allegedly came to a head in the spring of 1908, when Kid Twist and Cyclone Louie got the drop on Pioggi in a Coney Island gin mill and forced him, at gunpoint, to jump out of a second-story window.

In the late afternoon of May 14, 1908, Kid Twist and Cyclone Louie repaired to Coney Island to watch Carroll Terry's show at the Imperial. Afterwards, she hooked Louie up with a fellow dancer named Mabel Leon, and the two couples went to a nearby cafe on Oceanic Walk for dinner. The quartet left the cafe around 8pm and began walking down the avenue. Pioggi shot the two gangsters. Kid Twist was fatally struck once while Cyclone Louie was shot six times. Both men collapsed dead into the doorway of the South Brooklyn Hotel. Terry was hit in the hip.

=== Aftermath ===
Pioggi was arrested several days later in Saybrook, Connecticut. The two charges of murder were downgraded to manslaughter, and Pioggi pleaded guilty. After receiving his sentence of eleven months in jail, Pioggi sneered that, "I could do that standin' on me head!" After the death of Kid Twist Zweifach, the Eastman Gang split into factions, continuing their feud with the Five Pointers. Leadership of the largest faction eventually fell to Zweifach's young protégé, Jack Zelig.

Years later, it was said that gangster Abe Reles took his nickname of "Kid Twist" from the long-dead Zweifach.
