= Stuss =

Card game

Stuss or Jewish faro is a card game, a variant of faro. In this version (played in house games, back rooms, and saloons), the cards are dealt from the dealer's hand, not from a shoe. Also, the house wins all the money when drawing two equal cards, as opposed to half in traditional faro. This greatly increases the house's advantage over its patrons.

Stuss was particularly popular in the late nineteenth century in New York City and Chicago in the United States, continuing until the time of World War I. It was frequently played in ethnic immigrant neighborhoods.
