= Five Points Gang =

19th-century street gang in New York City

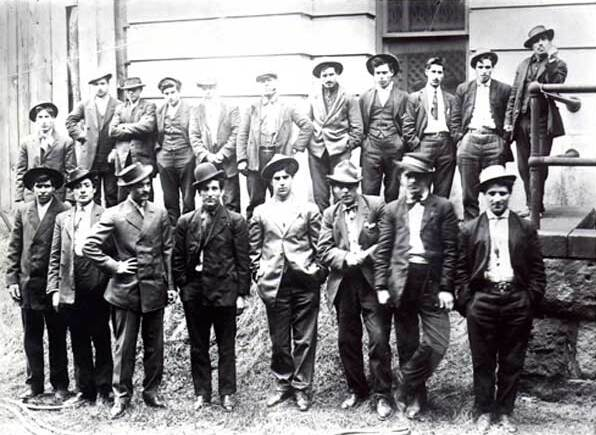
- Members of the Five Points Gang of New York City
- Founder: Paul Kelly
- Founding location: Five Points, Manhattan
- Years active: 1890s–1920s
- Territory: New York City, mainly active in Lower Manhattan, Harlem and Brooklyn
- Ethnicity: Initially predominantly Irish members and retained many Irish members late into its existence. Throughout its existence, members were most consistently all immigrants or the first-generation sons of immigrants; the gang eventually included and was run by many Italian-Americans and Italian immigrants in its later iteration.
- Leader: Paul Kelly
- Activities: Racketeering, election fraud, extortion, street fighting, drug trafficking, pimping, illegal gambling, robbery, fraud, murder, knife fighting, shootouts, assaults
- Allies: Tammany Hall, Yakey Yakes, Gopher Gang, Hudson Dusters, Whyos, Morello crime family, Bugs and Meyer Gang
- Rivals: Eastman Gang, White Hand Gang, Batavia Street Gang, New York Camorra, Lenox Avenue Gang, New York City Police Department
- Notable members: Jack McManus; Johnny Spanish; Louis Pioggi; Johnny Torrio; Lucky Luciano; Al Capone; Frankie Yale; Meyer Lansky; Bugsy Siegel; James T. Ellison; Nathan Kaplan

The Five Points Gang was a criminal street gang, initially of primarily Irish-American origins, based in the Five Points of Lower Manhattan, New York City, during the late 19th and early 20th century.

The gang had its origin in the various Irish immigrant and Irish-American gangs in the Five Points area. Paul Kelly, born Paolo Antonio Vaccarelli before utilizing an Irish-sounding name, was an Italian-American who organized and founded the more cohesive "Five Points Gang". While the gang had some continuity with the prior Irish gangs of the Five Points, it eventually predominantly consisted of the Italian immigrant and Italian-American gangsters that had begun to populate the previously mostly Irish-American Five Points. The gang eventually consisted largely of Italian-Americans and Italian immigrants living in the Five Points, though it continued to include Irish-American members and members of other ethnicities throughout its existence. Some of the gang's members later became prominent criminals in their own right, including Johnny Torrio, Al Capone, and Lucky Luciano.

== Five Points ==
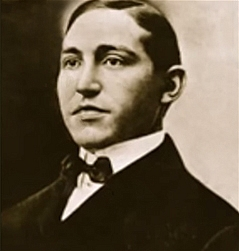
Paul Kelly, founder of the Five Points Gang

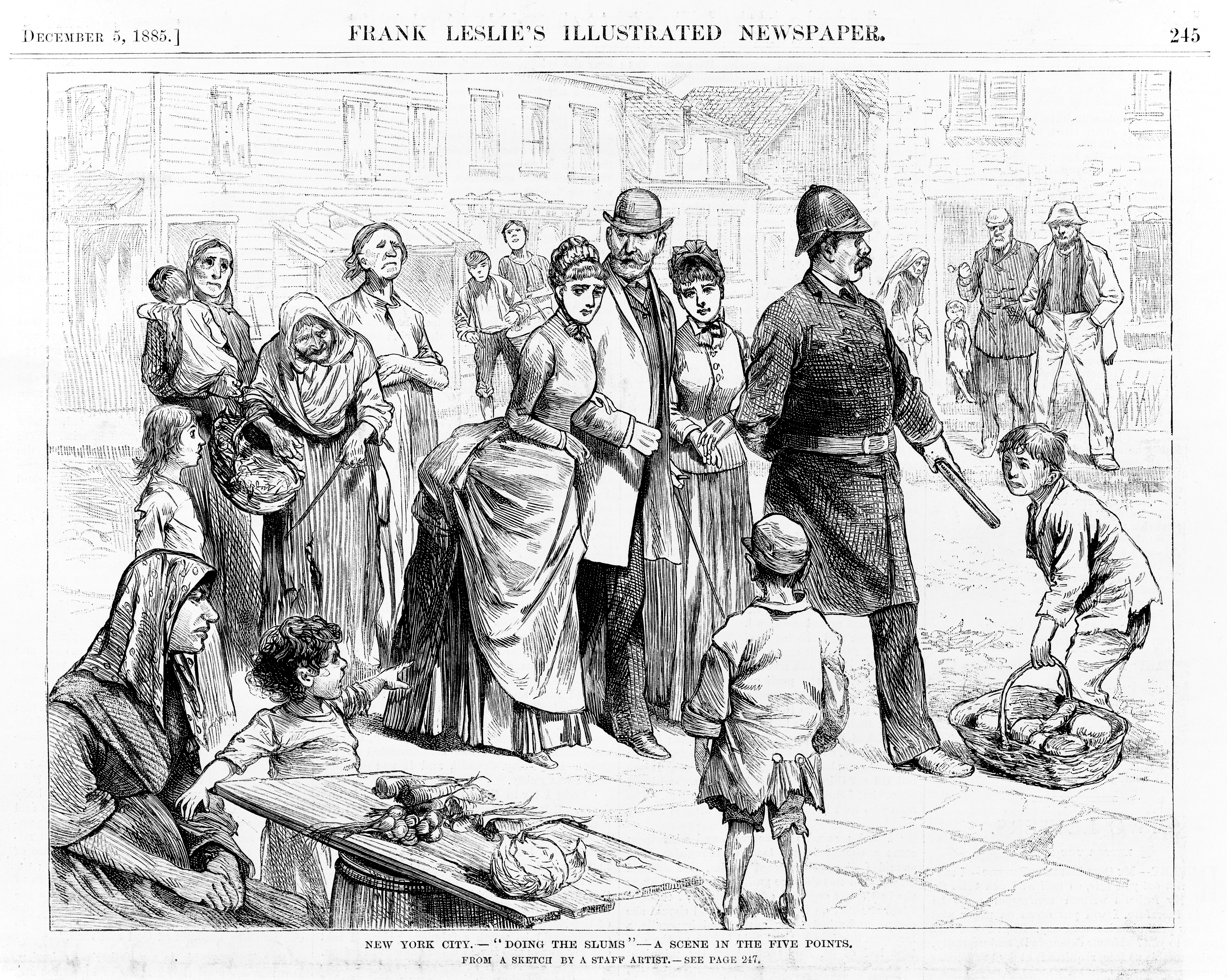
A slum tour through the Five Points in an 1885 sketch

The area of Manhattan where four streets – Anthony (now Worth), Cross (now Mosco), Orange (now Baxter), and Little Water (now nonexistent) – converged was known as the "Five Points". Mulberry, notorious for slum tenements, was one street down from the Five Points. This area, now the present-day location of Chinatown, lay between Broadway and the Bowery. By the 1820s, this district had been a center of settlement for poor immigrants and was considered a slum area of run-down wood frame and brick dwellings, warehouses and commercial enterprises dating from the late 18th century and early 19th century, populated by mostly poor English and Scots-Irish with increasing waves of German, Welsh and Irish refugees by the 1840s.

Gambling dens and brothels were numerous in the Five Points area, which was considered a dangerous destination, where many people had been mugged, particularly at night. In 1842, famous British author Charles Dickens visited the area and was appalled at the poor living conditions and substandard housing.

In the pre–civil war era, Catholic immigrants often dealt with ethnic prejudice and class discrimination from Nativist White Anglo-Saxon Protestants. As a result, many Irish immigrants formed local street gangs such as the Kerryonians, the Forty Thieves, the Shirt Tails, and the Chichesters, to rebel against their low social status. These street gang members soon turned to crime.

Shortly before the American Civil War, these gangs began to dissipate, with remaining members joining powerful gangs such as the Dead Rabbits and the Whyos. Eventually the influence and numbers of these Irish gangs started to wane.

By the 1870s a new wave of Italian and Eastern European Jewish immigrants were settling into the area. Criminal gangs of Irish, Jewish and Italian criminals began competing for control of the territory, rackets and revenue to be made from illicit activities. Monk Eastman's Eastman Coin Collectors originally had many Irish members before becoming predominantly Jewish.

== Origins ==
Italian American Paul Kelly (born Paolo Antonio Vaccarelli), formed the Five Points Gang, then made up mostly of Italians. The Five Points Gang had a reputation for brutality and in battles with rival gangs they often fought to the death. The gang would then gain more power and members when Kelly recruited the remaining members of other Five Points gangs, such as the Dead Rabbits and Whyos, into his growing gang.

As time went on, Jewish, Polish and Eastern European immigrants would also be brought within the ranks of the Five Points Gang, making them even more powerful and influential. Al Capone came from the James Street gang and would later lead the Chicago Outfit. Charles "Lucky" Luciano also joined the Five Points Gang in his younger years and was later considered the most powerful criminal in the country.

== Rise to power ==
Biff Ellison, a former member and would-be leader of the Five Points Gang.

As the Five Points Gang became more experienced, Kelly and his lieutenants saw the money to be made by supporting corrupt politicians in their election bids. By threatening voters, falsifying voter lists and stuffing ballot boxes, the gang aided city officials of the Democratic Party political machine Tammany Hall to retain power. At the turn of the 20th century, the only competitors to the Five Pointers were from Monk Eastman's gang.

The rivals disputed claims to a strip of territory of the Lower East Side of Manhattan. In 1901, a Five Pointer shot Eastman in the stomach, but he survived. Soon after, one of his crew killed a Five Pointer in retaliation. By 1903 the feud escalated, and the two gangs openly engaged in warfare. In one incident, Kelly, Torrio and 50 Five Pointers were in a gun battle with a similarly sized force of Eastman's gang. City Police called to the scene had to retreat from the battle, which lasted several hours. Three men were killed, and many were wounded in the battle. When the police finally gained control of the situation, they arrested Eastman, but he spent only a few hours in jail. A Tammany-controlled judge released him after Eastman swore that he was innocent.

The general public was angered about warfare in the streets. A Tammany Hall deputy named Tom Foley brought Kelly and Eastman together and told them that neither would receive any political protection if they did not resolve the border dispute. They restored peace for a short time, but within two months, violence had risen again. Officials brought together the two leaders, but asked them to take on each other in a boxing match with the winner's gang to take the disputed territory.

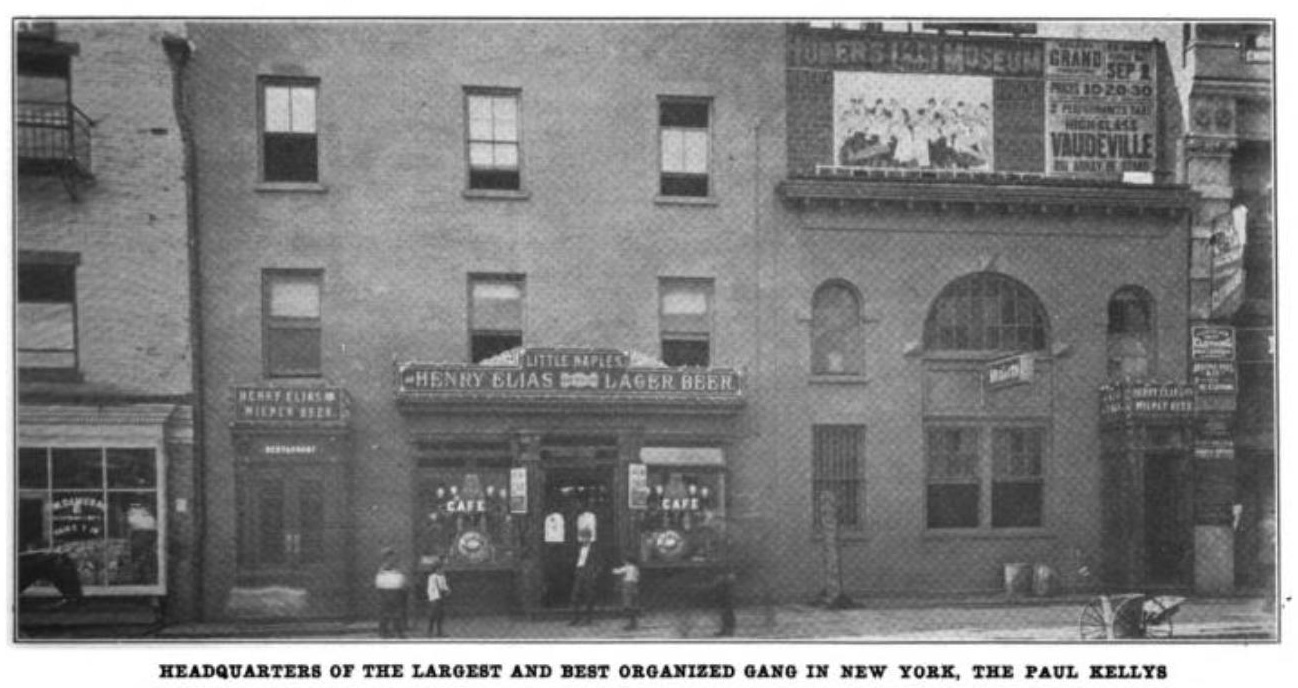
The New Brighton/Little Naples Cafe, main clubhouse of Paul Kelly's Five Pointers gang.

On the appointed day, hundreds of men from both sides met at an abandoned house in the Bronx. Eastman and Kelly fought each other viciously. Kelly had been a boxer in his younger days, and was said to make a better showing in the earlier rounds, but Eastman was a larger man and fought ferociously. The fight lasted two hours and by the end of the match, both had suffered heavy punishment, but neither man had been knocked out and the match was declared a draw. The gang leaders told their men that they were still at war.

At this point, the Tammany Hall bosses decided to back the Five Points crew and to withdraw any legal or political help for Eastman and his gang. In 1904 Eastman was beaten unconscious by a policeman who had foiled a robbery in progress. Eastman was convicted of the crime and sentenced to a 10-year term in Sing Sing prison (Ossining Correctional Facility) in Ossining, New York.

== Ascendancy ==
Eastman's imprisonment meant the Five Points Gang had no effective rival for control of organized crime activities on the Lower East Side. During that time, Kelly's organization expanded into other parts of Manhattan and parts of New Jersey. The Eastman crew was largely eclipsed when Eastman's successor Max "Kid Twist" Zwerbach, a former member of the Five Points Gang until he defected to the Eastman Gang, was murdered in 1908 by hitmen of the Five Points Gang, allegedly at the behest of Paul Kelly.

Kelly brought a more businesslike approach to his gang activities. He opened the New Brighton Athletic Club, a two-story cafe and dance hall at 57 Great Jones Street (between Lafayette and Bowery), where he charmed socialites and other prominent citizens who frequented his club. Always well dressed, Kelly spoke French, Italian, and Spanish fluently, and appreciated fine art and classical music. His educated and sophisticated persona impressed many of New York's elite.

== Decline and final years ==
Paolo Vaccarelli/Paul Kelly survived an attempt on his life, after being shot three times by two of his former lieutenants, James T. "Biff" Ellison and Pat "Razor" Riley, in a gun battle inside the New Brighton in 1905. Tammany Hall pressure made him keep a lower profile after this incident, while New York Police Commissioner William McAdoo closed the New Brighton for the protection of its socialite regulars. This failed assassination began the decline of Kelly's dominance in the New York underworld.

Kelly and his gang did not, however, disappear. After Kelly closed the New Brighton, he moved operations to the Italian immigrant communities in Harlem and Brooklyn, while also retaining ties to his old neighborhood, becoming a vice president of the International Longshoremen's Association (ILA) under his Americanized birth name of Paul Vaccarelli. He was based in the Chelsea area.

Kelly/Vaccarelli was expelled from the ILA in 1919, but returned to it later that year. He took leadership of a spontaneous port-wide strike begun in protest against a wage increase of only five cents an hour, which management had agreed to. With the support of Mayor John F. Hylan, Kelly was appointed to a commission to resolve the strike. He ended it but did not achieve any concessions for the strikers.

Kelly subsequently became a labor racketeer, providing muscle in labor disputes during the 1920s. Kelly died of natural causes in 1936.

Gradually the Mafia gangs took over the rackets and criminal activities formerly controlled by the Five Points Gang. Former Five Pointers such as Torrio, Capone, Lansky and Luciano became the leaders of the new groups and, with mentoring from influential businessman and criminal genius Arnold Rothstein, expanded their operations on a national and international basis. With the 18th Amendment and the Volstead Act establishing Prohibition in 1920, profits from bootlegged liquor became a huge source of revenue for the Mafia families.

Kelly's second-in-command John Torrio was the first to establish his style of racketeering in Chicago, recruiting Capone to join him there. Torrio later helped form a National Crime Syndicate in the United States, following the demise of the Five Points Gang and after Capone replaced him in Chicago, in coordination with Luciano and Lansky.

== See also ==
- List of identities in The Gangs of New York (book)
