= Monk Eastman =

American mobster

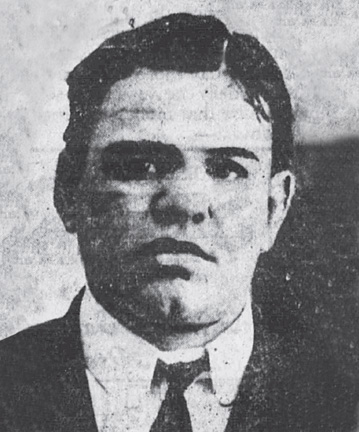
- 1903 NYPD mugshot
- Born: Edward Eastman; 1875; New York City, U.S.
- Died: December 26, 1920 (aged 44–45); New York City, U.S.
- Cause of death: Gunshot
- Other name: Joseph Morris {August 1903
- Occupations: gangster; soldier; dockworker
- Status: served sentence-deceased
- Convictions: 1904; 1912; 1915
- Criminal charges: 1901 reported wounded in gang fight December 1902 arrested on assault charge {acquitted
- Penalty: Sing Sing and Dannemora

Edward "Monk" Eastman (1875 – December 26, 1920), was an American gangster who founded and led the Eastman Gang, one of the most powerful street gangs in New York in the late 19th and early 20th century. His aliases included Joseph "Joe" Morris, Joe Marvin, William "Bill" Delaney, and Edward "Eddie" Delaney. Eastman is considered to be one of the last of the 19th-century New York City gangsters who preceded the rise of Arnold Rothstein and the Jewish mob. Later, more sophisticated, organized criminal enterprises also included the Italian American Cosa Nostra.

== Early life ==
Monk was born Edward Eastman in 1875 in the Corlear's Hook section of the Lower East Side of Manhattan of New York City, New York to Samuel Eastman, a Civil War veteran and wallpaper-hanger, and his wife Mary (Parks) Eastman. They were most likely descended from English ancestors of the colonial period. By the time Monk was five, his father had abandoned the family. Mary moved with her children to her father George Parks' home on the Upper East Side.

According to the 1880 United States Census, 5-year-old Edward Eastman lived with his mother and other family on East Seventy-Fifth Street, in Manhattan. The household was headed by his maternal grandfather George Parks, age 68, who worked in a dry goods store. Parks was born in New York, as were both his parents.

In the 1870 U.S. census, Mary Eastman had been living on Cannon Street on the Lower East Side of Manhattan with her husband Samuel Eastman, age 40, born in New York and working as a paper hanger. Living with them were their children Lizzie and Willie, age 3, born in New York. Willie likely died young, as he was not listed with the family in 1880.

In the 1860 census, Samuel Eastman was living as a single man in Manhattan in the household of Thomas McSpedon, from a prominent old NYC family. His mentor's firm, McSpedon & Baker, on Pine Street in New York, was the official printer for the city government. In addition to running his business, McSpedon served as an elected Alderman in NYC and as appointed City Fire Marshall during the mid-19th century. Eastman worked as a paper hanger.

By the 1900 census, Mary Eastman lived in Queens on Curtis Avenue, with her daughters Elizabeth and Francine and their families. Edward Eastman is listed in the same census as a "bird salesman" residing on East First Street in Lower Manhattan, living with and married since 1896 to Margaret Eastman.

Going by the nickname "Monk", Eastman was not recorded as having been arrested until after his grandfather died. At some point, Parks helped his grandson set up a pet shop on Broome Street. For years after being widely known as a gangster, Eastman listed "bird seller" as his occupation on government forms. At some point, he returned to live on the Lower East Side and became involved with the neighborhood gangs made up of poor, young men, often children of immigrants. Operations included a bike rental racket.

=== Ethnicity ===
Eastman's ancestry has been a subject of debate by reporters and historians. Because his criminal enterprise involved so many members of Jewish-American organized crime, Eastman is frequently depicted as being Jewish (including by some newspapers of his period). However, researchers have documented that he appears to have been a Protestant of British European descent.

In his book The Jews of Sing Sing, writer Ron Arons notes that none of Monk's sisters (nor his parents) were married in Jewish ceremonies. His maternal grandfather George Parks died in a Baptist rest home. When Eastman was buried, his funeral service was performed by a Methodist pastor.

== Criminal career ==
In 1898, Monk Eastman was arrested and convicted of larceny under the alias William Murray (one of the many Irish aliases which he used). He was jailed for three months on Blackwell's Island. During this time, he belonged to a gang of pimps and thieves known as the Allen Street Cadets.

The writer Herbert Asbury described Eastman as having a messy head of wild hair, wearing a derby hat two sizes too small for his head, sporting numerous gold-capped teeth, and often parading around shirtless or in tatters, always accompanied by his cherished pigeons. He had a broad five-foot-six inch frame. In time, Monk's reputation as a tough guy earned him the job of "sheriff" or bouncer at the New Irving Hall, a celebrated club on Broome Street, not far from his pet shop.

At the New Irving Hall and Silver Dollar Smith's Saloon, Eastman became acquainted with Tammany Hall politicians, who were powerful in New York and deeply involved with the ethnic immigrant communities. They eventually put him and his cohort to work as "repeat voters" in elections and strong-arm men to intimidate the opposition.

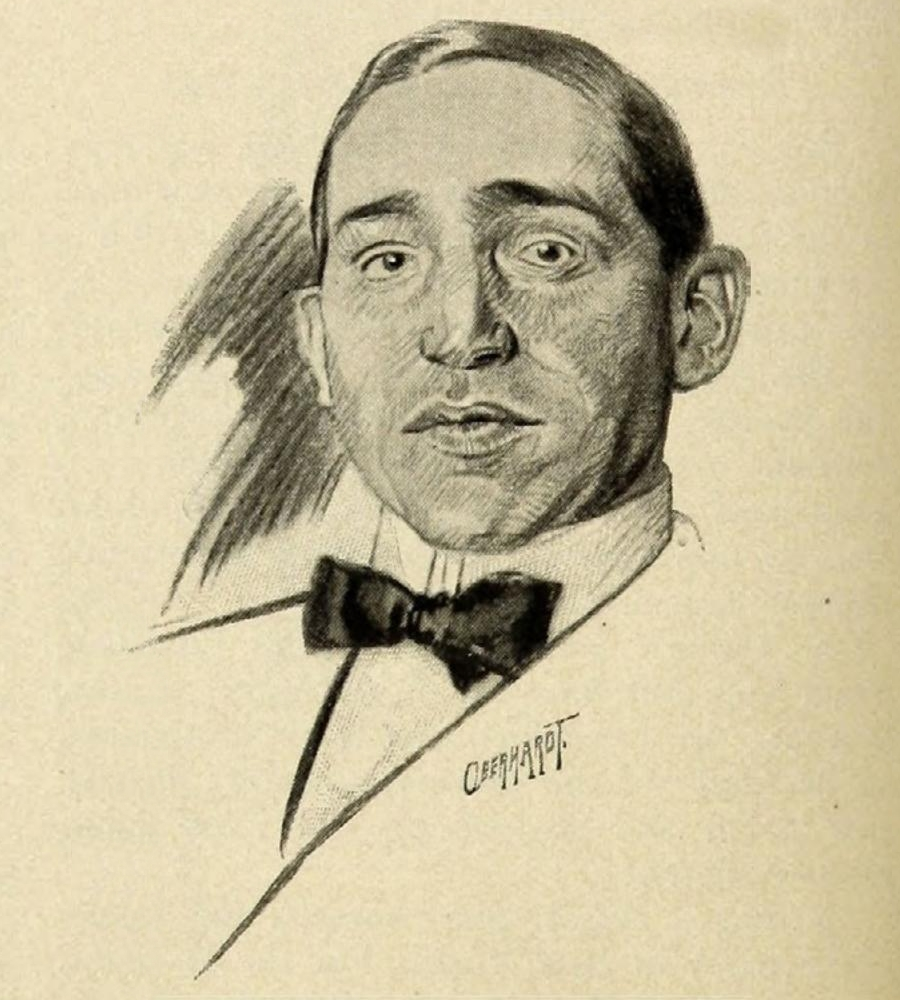
Paul Kelly, illustration by William Oberhardt, 1909

Eastman's greatest rival was Paul Kelly (born Paolo Antonio Vaccarelli), an immigrant leader of the majority-Italian Five Points Gang. In 1900, at the turn of the 20th century, Eastman lived at 221 E. 5th Street, about two blocks from Kelly's New Brighton Social Club at 57 Great Jones Street. The warfare between these two gangs reached a fever pitch on September 17, 1903, with a protracted gun battle on Rivington Street among dozens of gangsters. One gang member was killed and a second reported fatally wounded, by a policeman. Numerous innocent civilians were injured. Some 18 members of the Eastman gang were reported as arrested.

Tammany Hall worked closely with both Kelly and Eastman to mobilize their members in elections and patronage schemes. Its officials grew tired of the feuding and the bad press generated when civilians were killed or injured in the gangs' cross-fire. In 1903, Tammany Hall set up a boxing match between Eastman and Kelly in an old barn in the Bronx to settle the feuding. The fight lasted two hours, with both men taking hard punishment before it was called a draw. The politicians pressed the leaders to call a truce and end the street violence.

== Prison ==
On February 3, 1904, Eastman tried to rob a young man on 42nd Street and Broadway in Manhattan. As the man was being followed by two Pinkerton agents hired by the man's family to keep him out of trouble in the city, the agents intervened. Eastman shot at them while escaping, but was caught by policemen responding to the shooting. Tired of bad publicity from Eastman, Tammany Hall refused to help him. Later that year, Eastman was convicted of attempted assault and sentenced to 10 years in prison at Sing Sing penitentiary.

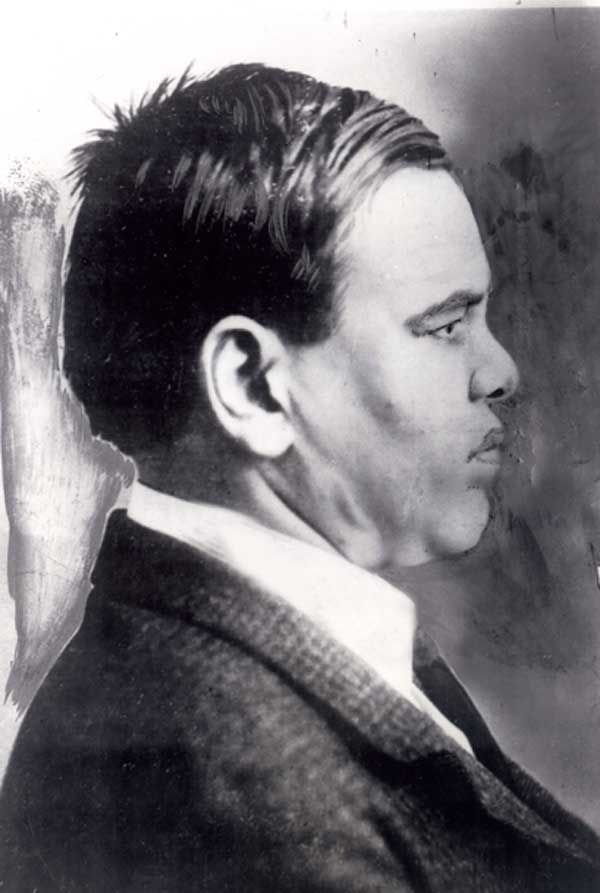
Monk Eastman, circa 1910–1920

In 1909, Eastman was released after serving five years in prison. During his absence, the Eastman Gang had split into several factions; one of his top men, Max Zwerbach, was dead. Since none of the surviving gang factions wanted Eastman as their leader, he was effectively out of power. For several years, Eastman reverted to petty thievery. During this period, he became addicted to opium and served several short jail terms.

== Military service ==
After the United States entered World War I in 1917, 42-year-old Eastman decided to join the Army. During his military physical, the doctor observed all the knife and bullet scars on Eastman's body and asked him which wars he had been in. Eastman replied, "Oh! A lot of little wars around New York." He served in France with "O'Ryan's Roughnecks," the 106th Infantry Regiment of the 27th Infantry Division. Eastman was pardoned by Tammany Governor Al Smith after his unit and commanding officers petitioned the governor, and sent letters along with his military records.The Governor also restored Eastman's voting rights.

== Final years and death ==
After his discharge from the Army, Eastman quickly returned to a life of crime. According to Jerome Charyn, author of Gangster and Gold Diggers, Eastman entered bootlegging working for Arnold Rothstein. One of his partners was Jeremiah W. Bohan, a corrupt Prohibition and Internal Revenue agent. On the morning of December 26, 1920, Eastman and Bohan met with other men at the Bluebird Cafe (62 east 14th street) in Lower Manhattan. Around 4:00 am, they argued over money, with Eastman and Bohan particularly at odds. When Bohan left, Eastman followed him. Feeling threatened, Bohan fatally shot Eastman several times with his pistol.

Eastman was buried with full military honors in Cypress Hills Cemetery in the Brooklyn borough of New York City, New York.

On January 4, 1921, The New York Times reported that Bohan had previously been tried and acquitted of the 1911 killing of Joseph "Joe the Bear" Faulkner. Bohan was held without bail following his confession to police on the day of the murder. On January 5, 1922 Bohan was convicted of manslaughter and sentenced to serve three to ten years in prison. On June 23, 1923, Bohan was released on parole.

The 1920 military funeral procession of Monk Eastman in New York City

== In popular culture ==
Eastman's life and exploits were fictionalized in the Jorge Luis Borges short story "El proveedor de iniquidades Monk Eastman" ("Monk Eastman, Purveyor of Iniquities"), included in the Borges collection Historia universal de la infamia ("A Universal History of Infamy"). He is also a recurring character in the Molly Murphy mystery series by Rhys Bowen.

In P.G. Wodehouse's 1914 novel Psmith, Journalist, the real Monk Eastman is mentioned in passing while most of Eastman's personality, physical appearance, and underworld prominence is given to the fictional gang leader Bat Jarvis.

Stephen Mendillo played Eastman as a henchman for Arnold Rothstein in the 1988 movie Eight Men Out.
