= Tanner Smith =

American criminal and gang leader

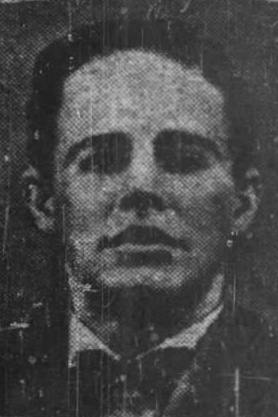
- Born: Thomas F. Smith c. 1887; Manhattan, New York, United States
- Died: July 26, 1919 (aged 32); Manhattan, New York
- Cause of death: Murdered
- Other names: Thomas H. Smith
- Occupations: Boss stevedore and contractor
- Known for: New York gang leader and founder of the Marginals
- Spouse: Mary O'Brien

Thomas F. "Tanner" Smith (c. 1887 – July 26, 1919) was an American criminal and gang leader in New York City during the early 20th century. He was the founder and leader of the Marginals, or "Irish Paddy Gang", which was active in Greenwich Village and along the Hudson River waterfront from around the turn of the 20th century until his murder in 1919. He was closely associated with Owney Madden and the Gophers; he and Madden briefly ran the Winona Club together until the New York City Police Department closed the clubhouse around 1910.

== Biography ==
=== Early life and the Marginals ===
Thomas F. Smith was born in Manhattan, New York around 1887, and worked as a "boss stevedore" for much of his adult life. He was reportedly related to local ward district politicians and, in an editorial by the New York Tribune, "acquired his leadership of this gang because of petty political influences". Tanner Smith and the Marginals, sometimes allied with the Pearl Buttons and later the Gopher Gang, battled the Hudson Dusters for control over the Hudson River waterfront and eventually took over when the Hudson Dusters disappeared from the district. Tanner eventually made the Pearl Buttons junior partners of the Marginals.

=== Winona Club shootout ===
Tanner and Owney Madden, then leader of the Gopher Gang, had been allies against the Hudson Dusters and eventually formed a close working relationship. Together they opened the Winona Club, a clubhouse intended to serve as a joint rendezvous and headquarters, located on West Forty-Seventh Street near Tenth Avenue. The gang's unruly behavior at the club soon disrupted life in the relatively well-to-do neighborhood as its members regularly "engaged in drunken revels and made the night hideous with the sound of their bickerings and brawlings".

The owner of the building, Dennis J. Keating, was a blacksmith by trade and apparently had no knowledge of his tenants identities. Keating lived with his family on the ground floor and, when neighbors began complaining to him about the noise, he confronted the gang warning that he would have to evict them if they could not keep the noise down. Tanner and Smith, who had been "discussing affairs of state over a bottle of whiskey", were surrounded by a half dozen gang members from both sides "lounging about the room listening to the music of a piano thumbed by a gifted thug". Upon being confronted by their landlord, Madden turned around and replied "You'll put me out of your house? Mister, did you ever hear of Owney Madden? Yes? Well, Mister, I am Owney Madden!"

Keating retreated to his home downstairs and was afraid to report the gangsters to the police fearing for his family's safety. The Gophers were especially known for their violence against police informers. Instead, a tenant from a neighboring boarding house ended up making a noise complaint and a police officer, Patrolman Sindt, from a local precinct were dispatched. Sindt quickly returned to the precinct when he discovered the occupants. He requested reinforcements from the precinct captain and a reserve squad under Detective Sergeant John J. O'Connell was sent out. Madden's spies informed their leader of their approach and by the time of O'Connell's arrival, the gangsters had already barricaded themselves inside. O'Connell's demand that they allow the police to enter the clubhouse was "greeted by threats and curses". O'Connell then walked up to the front door and banged on the front door with his club to which one of the gangsters fired out a window "and grazed a policeman's skull". Madden then called out to police threatening "We'll shoot the gizzard out of any cop who tries to get in here!"

O'Connell then ordered his men to withdraw around a corner and sent two patrolmen to gain entry to the building from the rear. The rest of the squad were then marched across the street, in full view of the gang, and O'Connell approached the club once again and started an argument with Madden and Tanner. While the rest of the gang crowded around the front windows to watch their leaders taunt the police, a rear window was left unguarded allowing the two patrolmen to sneak into the building. The two officers crept through the house until reaching the front room here the gang had gathered. They then rushed the gangsters in a surprise attack and the startled men were forced back momentarily. O'Connor immediately had his men break down the doors and within 15 minutes had placed all of the men under arrest and put them "handcuffed and bleeding" in a paddy wagon to a nearby precinct.

=== Legal battle against the NYPD ===
In court the next morning, both men were given light sentences. Madden, then still a minor, was "lectured by a benevolent judge" and placed under a $500 bond for six months. Tanner had also received minimal punishment and later gained an audience with then Mayor of New York William J. Gaynor where he showed his bruises to Gaynor and accused the arresting officers of police brutality. It was this meeting that resulted in the passage of "Order No. 7", a directive issued by Mayor Gaynor which prohibited the use of a billy club unless the officer could prove his life was in danger.

In March 1910, Tanner made a formal complaint against Patrolmen William H. Noll, Charles G. Flaherty and Andrew Brown who were accused of violating "Order No. 7". He claimed that he had been celebrating New Year's Day at a dance hall on Forty-Second Street and Eighth Avenue when the three officers, all on the staff of Inspector George W. McClusky of the Third District, threw him down a stairway while being ejected from the building. All three officers denied the allegation and claimed Smith fell down the stairs himself.

A number of people testified as character witnesses on the officers' behalf, several of them fellow police officers, however all three were fined on April 12, 1911. Noll and Flaherty were both fined 15 days pay while Brown was fined a full month. This case was part of a major grand jury investigation headed by First Assistant District Attorney Frank Moss. Smith was later tried and convicted for shooting a police officer.

=== War with the Gophers ===
On June 19, 1914, Tanner was arrested by police during a running gunfight with a member of the Gopher Gang. A local officer, Patrolman Krozer, had heard four gunshots fired in West Twentieth Street, near Tenth Avenue, and went to investigate. When he reached West Twentieth Street, Krozer witnessed the gang leader, with a revolver in his hand, chasing after a rival Gopher. Krozer pursued Tanner to a vacant lot on Twentieth Street where Smith proceeded to fight with the officer. A second officer, Patrolman Derleph, arrived to help Krozer subdue Smith and place him under arrest. As they took him away, members of his gang showed up and threatened the officers but were kept at bay. Tanner, while being booked at the West Twentieth Street Precinct, challenged the desk lieutenant to fight and was later charged with felonious assault. It was believed by police that Tanner and his gang were at war with Madden and his Gophers for control of lower Westside Manhattan. Smith was sent to prison for carrying a revolver and served a year sentence.

=== Retirement and murder ===
While in jail, many of the Marginals were arrested and imprisoned in The Tombs. Much of this was due to the NYPD's campaign against the city's street gangs, but also for some members connection to the First Labor Slugger War involving labor racketeers Benjamin "Dopey Benny" Fein and Joseph "Joe the Greaser" Rosenzweig against a coalition of independent gangsters headed by Philip "Pinchy" Paul.

Following his release in late 1914, Tanner decided to retire from crime after persuasion from his mother and sister. He spent the next five years as a boss stevedore and contractor. He became a successful businessman who gave back to his local neighborhood. He set up several boys clubs to keep the next generation out of trouble. In early 1919, he opened the Marginal Club above an Eighth Avenue saloon and apparently returned to his former criminal activities. On the night of July 26, 1919, Smith was playing poker at the Marginal Club when he was shot in the back and killed by an unknown assailant. It was speculated by police that Smith had been murdered in an underworld "gang feud".

In the days following Smith's murder, Smith's followers went on a violent rampage in the underworld. On July 31, Robert "Rubber" Shaw, an underworld rival and last leader of the Hudson Dusters, was killed, and George Lewis, a 21-year-old gang leader who had been feuding with Smith, was wounded in a shooting in Hoboken, New Jersey. On August 1, the District Attorney's office began rounding up members of Smith's organization and was prepared to charge at least two members with murder. Authorities in Hoboken followed suit taking several suspects in for questioning. Both the NYPD and the District Attorney's office believed that Shaw, Lewis and Link Mitchell, who had since fled the state, were responsible for Smith's murder and that friends of Smith had retaliated by going after Lewis and Shaw. Under the direction of District Attorney Edward Swann, Assistant District Attorney John F. Joyce stated that he intended to seek indictments and said "We have at least three persons who saw Shaw, Lewis, and a third man enter the Marginal Club, walk up behind Smith and begin shooting. Our records show that Lewis was released from Elmira Reformatory three months ago. He had been sent away for "sticking up" United Cigar Stores. In some respects, the case may be similar to the Baff murder in West Washington Market five years ago."

The next day, a joint search was organized by both New York and New Jersey police to apprehend Lefty Curry and Michael Costello, a suspect in the then recent murder of underworld figure Rubber Shaw. Curry, according to Joyce, was seen leaving the Marginal Club shortly after Smith had been shot and that he had been shot in the leg.

Tanner was worth about $25,000 (although other sources claim he had as much as $100,000) at the time of his death, or so his mother claimed, however he left no will and an application for letter of administration was made on her behalf on August 14. The following day in Surrogate's Court, his brother applied to become temporary administrator of Tanner Smith's estate until his widow could appear in court. His brother claimed that Smith's widow had previously left him to marry another man and was living in South Brooklyn under the name Mary O'Brien McGuire. Of the $25,000, about $15,000 had been deposited in Liberty Bonds and used as bail for Link Mitchell, then accused of robbery. Mitchell was later charged as an accessory to the murder of James Shore in Hoboken, New Jersey, a suspect in the murder of Smith.

=== Aftermath ===
In 1920, George Lewis was arrested and charged with the murder of Smith. The first case had been ruled a mistrial by Judge William H. Wadhams when one of the jury members died after an illness on February 2. A second trial was held that summer, but after a week's deliberations, a hung jury was declared by Judge Thomas C.T. Crain on July 1. The District Attorney's office announced that George Lewis would be tried again. Shortly before his third trial, in which he was to be charged with first degree murder, he instead pleaded guilty to manslaughter on October 19 and was remanded to The Tombs by Judge Otto A. Rosalsky.

Lewis was sentenced on November 4, 1920, having had initially been convicted and sentenced to serve between three and six years imprisonment by Judge Rosalsky, the maximum sentence allowable by law (as pertaining to his plea bargain). However, Lewis protested the court's ruling and said "Your Honor, you can't do that. I've been in prison before. Only first offenders get the benefit of an indeterminate sentence. I'll have to take a flat sentence." Judge Rosalsky, having been unaware that Lewis had been previously convicted, promptly sentenced him to three years in Sing Sing.

== In popular culture ==
Smith is portrayed in the historical novels Very Old Bones: The Albany Cycle Series (1992) by William Kennedy, And All The Saints (2003) by Michael Walsh and Firecrackers: A Realistic Novel (2007) by Carl Van Vechten.
