= Hudson Dusters =

Early twentieth century New York City street gang

- Founded: c. 1890
- Founded by: Circular Jack; Kid Yorke; Goo Goo Knox
- Founding location: Downtown Manhattan New York
- Years active: 1890s–1917
- Territory: Manhattan
- Ethnicity: Irish-American
- Membership (est.): 300 (est.)
- Criminal activities: Burglary, armed robbery, street muggings, assault, narcotics.
- Rivals: Boodle Gang; Marginals; Pearl Buttons; Fashion Plates; Gopher Gang

The Hudson Dusters were a New York City street gang during the early twentieth century.

== Formation ==
Formed in the late 1890s by "Circular Jack", "Kid Yorke", and "Goo Goo Knox", the gang began operating from an apartment house on Hudson Street. Knox, a former member of the Gopher Gang, had fled after a failed attempt to gain leadership of the gang from then-leader Marty Brennan. However, the two gangs later became allies during the gang wars against Gay Nineties gangs, the Potashes and Boodle Gangs, soon controlling most of Manhattan's West Side as far as 13th Street and eastern Broadway, bordering Paul Kelly's Five Points Gang to the north. While the gang dominated the West Side, it constantly battled smaller rival gangs including the Fashion Plates, the Pearl Buttons, and the Marginals for control of the Hudson River docks throughout the 1900s. Eventually, it drove the rival gangs out through sheer force of numbers, with over 200 members, not including the Gophers, who numbered several hundred more, controlling the waterfront by 1910.

The gang, now a dominant force in New York, included Charles "Red" Farrell, Mike Costello, "Rubber" Shaw, Rickey Harrison, and "Honey" Stewart. The gang became involved in election fraud as they were hired out by Tammany Hall politicians in exchange for political protection. A colorful member by the name of Ding Dong organized a push cart theft ring whereby he had a group of apprentice gang members toss packages to him from a passing wagon, distracting the police. Soon the gang began to be noticed by the press as reporters met members in Greenwich Village tavern hangouts, becoming glamorized by the city. They came to represent the bohemian spirit of the area. According to author Lucy Sante, activist Dorothy Day, by her own admission, spent much of her youth partying with the Dusters in Greenwich Village. Many of the gang's members, including most of its leaders, had become drug addicts and were known for their wild "cocaine parties" in which the gang wandered the city afterwards in a drugged state committing violent acts. One victim of these attacks was Gopher member Owney Madden, who was shot six times outside the Arbor Dance Hall on November 6, 1914, resulting in the deaths of three of the gang members less than a week later. With the gang's political connections to Tammany Hall, the police remained inactive. However, the gang frequently moved its headquarters to avoid police raids by "strong arm squads".

The gang, which regularly demanded goods from local merchants, soon attracted the unwanted attention of the police after an incident in which the gang destroyed a saloon after its owner refused to deliver six barrels of beer to a gang party. The saloon keeper reported this to his friend Dennis Sullivan, a patrolman from the Charles Street station, who arrested Farrell and ten other members at a local pool hall for vagrancy. The gang retaliated, luring Sullivan into the neighborhood onto the premises of a local merchant, who had been forced to make a complaint against a member of the gang. When Sullivan arrived he was attacked by approximately twenty members and severely beaten, eventually losing consciousness. He was stripped of his uniform and his badge was thrown into a sewer drain. As the gang fled, five members remained behind to jump on Sullivan's back and to kick him in the face repeatedly before a police "flying squad" arrived. Sullivan was hospitalized for over a month and the incident was immortalized in a poem by Gopher leader "One Lung" Curran:

Says Dinny "Here's me only chance
To gain meself a name;
I'll clean up the Hudson Dusters,
and reach the hall of fame."
He lost his stick and cannon,
and his shield they took away.
It was then that he remembered,
Every dog has got his day.

The gang liked the poem so much they had it printed on thousands of sheets and distributed throughout the neighborhood as well as the Charles Street Station and the hospital where Sullivan was recovering. The song grew to be so popular that many juvenile gangs would sing the tune on the street.

By 1914 however, with most of its leaders in jail or dead from drug overdoses, the remainder of the gang were driven from their territory by the Marginals under Tanner Smith, who after defeating the Pearl Buttons would assume control for the next decade. The last members of the gang were eventually arrested by police during their clearing of gangs from Manhattan in 1916.

== Members ==
- Circular Jack
- Kid Yorke
- Frank "Goo Goo" Knox (died August 26, 1921)

A West Side gunman, Knox had a lengthy criminal career, spending time in the House of Refuge for disorderly conduct in 1912, the New York State Reformatory for felonious assault in 1914, and Elmira Reformatory for grand larceny in 1916. In 1918, he was taken into custody at Jersey City and charged with draft dodging but was released on probation. He was killed by John Hudson in what police suspected was a dispute over bootlegging. He was believed by authorities to have ceased criminal activities for two years before his body was found on the sidewalk of 52nd Street. Hudson later died of a morphine overdose at Bellevue Hospital under mysterious circumstances.

- Charles "Red" Farrell (born 1851)

A longtime burglar and pickpocket, Farrell would be in and out of prison from 1883 onwards. By the time of his ninth and final arrest in August 1922, the 71-year-old thief was one of the oldest pickpockets operating in the city and was sentenced to six months' imprisonment for "jostling".

- Mike Costello
- Robert "Rubber" Shaw (died July 31, 1919)

One of the later gang leaders, Shaw was gunned down in a drive-by shooting while standing on a street corner with George Lewis in Hoboken on July 31, 1919. His death is thought to have been in revenge for the murder of rival gang leader Thomas "Tanner" Smith of the Marginals only five days before.

- Richard "Rickey" Harrison (c. 1893 – May 13, 1920)

A prominent member during the early 1900s, Harrison survived an attempt on his life while imprisoned in The Tombs when he was stabbed in November 1914, and refused to identify his attacker while recovering in Bellevue Hospital. Later arrested for the robbery of the Knickerbocker Waiters Club on September 7, 1918 (during which a visiting Canadian soldier, George Griffelns, was killed), he escaped from The Tombs on October 4. However, he was recaptured by detectives in Newark on October 16. Eventually extradited to New York, despite appeals to the US Supreme Court, he was convicted of murder and armed robbery for which he was executed by the electric chair in Sing Sing Prison on May 13, 1920.

- "Honey" Stewart
- William "Brother Mac" McNamara

While still a teenager, McNamara took part in a murder-for-hire plot in January 1916, in which he and another man, known only as "Dutch", attacked and fatally injured a gardener named Gregorio George in Dobbs Ferry, New York, on behalf of George's wife, who was in love with another man. That June, McNamara was tried in White Plains for the murder, convicted, and sentenced to death. The following year, in June 1917, his death sentence was commuted by Governor Whitman to life in prison.

== In popular culture ==
- Several members of the Hudson Dusters are portrayed in the historical novels The Angel of Darkness, by Caleb Carr (1997), and Free Love (2001) and Murder Me Now by Annette Meyers.
- A 2020 TV series, The Alienist, based on the novel by Caleb Carr also features Hudson Dusters members.
- Dave Van Ronk, the noted Greenwich Village guitarist/singer, formed a band called The Hudson Dusters, and released an LP album (1968?) under that name (Verve/Forecast LZR 70413).
- The Hudson Dusters are hired by Henry Clay to ambush and beat Joseph Vandorn in the Clive Cussler novel The Striker, one of the Isaac Bell series.
- Damon Runyon references the gang in his Broadway story "Blood Pressure". Walking into a Manhattan speakeasy in the mid-1920s: "Rusty Charley and Knife O'Halloran are having a drink together out of a bottle which Knife carries in his pocket, so as not to get it mixed up with the liquor he sells his customers, and are cutting up old touches of the time when they run with the Hudson Dusters together, when all of a sudden in comes four coppers in plain clothes."

== General references ==
- "Arrested In Court In Bootleg Killing; Suspect Said to Be One of Band Which Killed Comrade on Sunday Night. Recently Left Sing Sing Body Found in Fifty-second Street Is Linked With Two Other Men Now Wanted." The New York Times, August 30, 1921.
- "Gets 6 Months in Pen to Complete 25 Years, 'Red' Farrell, Arrested Nine Times, Listed by Police as One of Oldest Pickpockets", September 13, 1922.
- "Drugged in Tombs, Autopsy Reveals; Morphine Blamed for Sudden Collapse in Cell of Gunman's Alleged Slayer". The New York Times, March 18, 1922.
- "Gunmen Busy In New York Again, Swift Vengeance for Death of Gang Leader". Boston Daily Globe, August 2, 1919.
- "Rickey Harrison Captured". The New York Times, October 17, 1918.
- "Harrison Executed As Convicts "Jazz", Sing Sing Prisoners Staging Vaudeville Show When Bandit-Slayer Goes to Chair". The New York Times, May 13, 1918.
- "Prisoners Stabbed In Tombs; May Die, "Hudson Duster" Gangster Wounded Dangerously Under the Eyes of Keepers". The New York Times, November 14, 1914.
- "Say Gangster Admits He Was Hired to Kill," The Evening World, January 27, 1916.
