= The Warlord: Battle for the Galaxy =

- UK VHS bearing the title The Osiris Chronicles
- Genre: Science fiction
- Written by: Caleb Carr
- Directed by: Joe Dante
- Starring: John Corbett; Carolyn McCormick; John Pyper-Ferguson; Elisabeth Harnois; J. Madison Wright; Rod Taylor
- Theme music composer: Karl Lundeberg
- Country of origin: United States
- Original language: English

Production
- Producers: Dan Dugan; Bill Millar; Rene Garcia; Thomas R. Polizzi
- Cinematography: Jamie Anderson
- Editors: Marshall Harvey; Michael Thau
- Running time: 97 minutes
- Production companies: Renfield Productions; Paramount Television

Original release
- Network: UPN
- Release: January 27, 1998

The Warlord: Battle for the Galaxy (also known as The Osiris Chronicles) is a 1998 American television science fiction film which aired on January 27, 1998 on UPN. The film is written by screenwriter Caleb Carr, who wrote the novel The Alienist, and directed by Joe Dante. It was intended to be the pilot for a series called The Osiris Chronicles that never materialized.

== Plot ==
On the planet Caliban 5, a young man named Justin Thorpe carves out a living for himself by trading items he obtains through stealing and salvaging. Thorpe comes home one night to discover his kid sister, Nova, has been kidnapped.

Frantic and desperate, Thorpe turns to Warlord Xian for help, but he does not have enough possessions to trade for Xian's services. Thorpe meets Nova's best friend, Maggi Sorenson, granddaughter of General Lars Sorenson. Maggi introduces her grandfather to Thorpe. Sorenson offers to help him by searching for Nova using his starship, the battleship Osiris.

Once inside the ship, they bump into Thorpe's long-time friend, Wally Price, who convinces the gang that his extraordinary intuition will aid in the search. Sorenson hires cloaked humanoid aliens, a race known only as "The Engineers," to repair the ship's engine. It is revealed that The Engineers are the ones holding Nova prisoner. Sorenson confesses to Thorpe that he knew this all along.

Meanwhile, the Warlord is hot on their trail in his destroyer, the Daedalus. He attacks their ship, but the Osiris escapes to the homeworld of The Engineers. They explain why they kidnapped Nova: she is a supergenius and they need her vast intellect for their Sublime Plenum, a huge amalgamation of their greatest ancestors’ minds and souls. Thorpe snatches Nova from The Engineers. The crew make it back to the Osiris, but Nova is grabbed away while the Osiris faces another attack by the Daedalus. However, Sorenson offers Xian a truce. With Xian's help, they defeat The Engineers and rescue Nova again.

Xian decides to help Thorpe rebuild the Galactic Republic with new ideals and values. Sorenson steps down as General and gives Thorpe the Osiris for him to command.

== Cast ==
=== Stars ===
- John Corbett as Justin Thorpe
- Carolyn McCormick as Rula Kor
- John Pyper-Ferguson as Heenoc Xian
- Elisabeth Harnois as Maggi Sorenson
- J. Madison Wright as Nova Thorpe
- Darryl Theirse as Wally
- Marjorie Monaghan as Jana
- Philip Moon as Valois
- Joel Swetow as Shahklan
- Rod Taylor as General Sorenson

=== Co-stars ===
- Lilyan Chauvin as Mashwah
- Rhino Michaels as Barka
- Dick Miller as Peddler
- Rob Elk as Guard
- Dyrk Ashton as Thief #1
- John Marlo as Thief #2
- Dorothy Gallagher as Assaulted Woman
- Michael Quill as Doctor
- Belinda Balaski as Bartender's Wife
- Dawn Ann Billings as Gita
- Leslie Redden as Magda
- Steven Daniels as Thief #3
- Tom Billet as Thief #4
- Gregory Kargianis as Young Boy
- Shannon Welch as Young Girl

== Production ==
Rod Taylor played a role originally meant for Christopher Lee. The budget was $10 million.
