= The Alienist (TV series) =

2018 American television period drama TV series

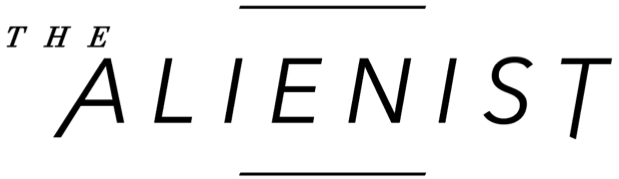
- Genre: Period drama; Crime; Thriller
- Based on: The Alienist; The Angel of Darkness by Caleb Carr
- Starring: Daniel Brühl; Luke Evans; Brian Geraghty; Robert Ray Wisdom; Douglas Smith; Matthew Shear; Q'orianka Kilcher; Matt Lintz; Dakota Fanning; Rosy McEwen; Melanie Field
- Composers: Rupert Gregson-Williams; Bobby Krlic
- Country of origin: United States
- Original language: English
- No. of seasons: 2
- No. of episodes: 18

Production
- Executive producers: Hossein Amini; E. Max Frye; Steve Golin; Rosalie Swedlin; Chris Symes; Jakob Verbruggen; Cary Joji Fukunaga; Eric Roth
- Production location: Budapest, Hungary
- Cinematography: PJ Dillon; Gavin Struthers; Chris Seager; Larry Smith
- Editor: Nick Arthurs
- Running time: 43–55 minutes
- Production companies: Paramount Television; Studio T; Anonymous Content; Vanessa Productions, Ltd.; Stuma Productions (season 2)

Original release
- Network: TNT
- Release: January 21, 2018 – August 9, 2020

The Alienist is an American period crime drama–thriller television series based on the 1994 novel by Caleb Carr. The series stars Daniel Brühl, Luke Evans, and Dakota Fanning as an ad hoc team assembled in mid-1890s New York City to investigate a serial killer who is murdering street children. It incorporates both fact and fiction by including the characters that are historical figures, such as Theodore Roosevelt, who held the post of police commissioner from 1895 to 1897. The ten-episode limited series aired on TNT from January 21, 2018, to March 26, 2018. In August 2018, TNT ordered a sequel series based on the 1997 follow-up novel The Angel of Darkness. The second season, titled The Alienist: Angel of Darkness, premiered on July 19, 2020, and aired through August 9, 2020.

== Premise ==
The first season is set in 1896, when a series of gruesome murders of boy prostitutes has gripped New York City. Newly appointed police commissioner Teddy Roosevelt calls upon Dr. Laszlo Kreizler, a criminal psychiatrist, and John Moore, a newspaper illustrator, to conduct the investigation in secret. Joining them in the probe is Sara Howard, Roosevelt's headstrong secretary, as well as twin brothers Marcus and Lucius Isaacson, both detective sergeants in the New York City Police Department (NYPD).

The team finds opposition within the NYPD, primarily from Captain Connor and the recently retired Chief Byrnes, both of whom are more committed to protecting the reputations of New York's high society than they are to finding the perpetrators of the crimes; as well as from the working poor and lower class citizens who distrust them for being outsiders.

In the second season, set a year later, Sara has opened a private detective agency. She, Kreizler, and Moore – now a New York Times reporter – team up to find the Spanish consul's kidnapped infant daughter. Their investigation puts them on a path of another elusive killer, while showcasing institutional corruption, income inequality, yellow journalism, and the role of women in 1890s society.

== Cast ==
=== Main ===
- Daniel Brühl as Laszlo Kreizler, an alienist (or psychiatrist) who has focused recently on children suffering from mental illnesses, called upon by his former Harvard classmate Theodore Roosevelt to try to understand the psychology behind grisly child murders. He is Hungarian and comes from a well-off family. He lives alone save for his maid, valet, and stable boy. He has a lame arm, and frequently seeks out the insight of former patients and criminals for help with his investigations and research.
- Luke Evans as John Schuyler Moore, a New York Times cartoonist and illustrator, as well as a society man who attended Harvard with Kreizler and Roosevelt. He lives with his grandmother, and is estranged from his father following the drowning death of his brother. He is handsome and charming, but is an alcoholic and frequenter of brothels, and remains unmarried after his fiancée left him for another man. Like Roosevelt, he has known Sara since she was young.
- Brian Geraghty as Theodore Roosevelt (season 1), the newly appointed commissioner of the NYPD. He is portrayed as commanding respect from certain people, but remains malleable by society's most venerable as well as veteran NYPD officers. He attended Harvard with Kreizler and Moore, both of whom he calls upon to mount a secret, parallel investigation into the child murders. He employs Sara Howard as his secretary, having known her father, and thinks highly of her.
- Robert Ray Wisdom as Cyrus Montrose, Kreizler's valet whom he employed after testifying on Cyrus' behalf during a murder trial
- Douglas Smith as Marcus Isaacson, a young Jewish detective sergeant with the NYPD whom Roosevelt enlists to work with Kreizler, Moore, and Howard. He is Lucius' twin brother, and like his brother, is well versed in science and general crime scene investigation. He becomes involved with a Jewish socialist.
- Matthew Shear as Lucius Isaacson, Marcus' twin brother and another detective sergeant with the NYPD. He is much more cautious and restrained than Marcus, and eager to utilize the latest scientific techniques to solve crimes.
- Q'orianka Kilcher as Mary Palmer (season 1), Kreizler's maid. Like Cyrus, she was taken in by Kreizler after she was acquitted for murder. She is mute and uses sign language to communicate, and has an affection for Kreizler.
- Matt Lintz (season 1) and Dominic Herman-Day (season 2) as Stevie Taggert, a youthful ward and stable boy of Kreizler's who often assists Cyrus, and gets involved in the team's investigation
- Dakota Fanning as Sara Howard, a young society woman who becomes Roosevelt's secretary and the first woman employed by the NYPD. She spent time in a sanitarium after the death of her father, whom Roosevelt and Moore both knew. She is composed and determined to not allow her male colleagues to disparage her. She gets involved with the team as a liaison between Roosevelt and Kreizler and Moore. By the start of the second season, she has left the NYPD and opened her own private detective agency. The character is loosely based upon the story of Isabella Goodwin, New York's first female detective.
- Rosy McEwen as Libby Hatch (season 2), a young nurse at the Lying In Hospital
- Melanie Field as Bitsy Sussman (season 2), Sara's assistant at the detective agency

=== Recurring ===
- Ted Levine as Thomas F. Byrnes, a corrupt retired police chief who steers Connor toward protecting the rich and wealthy from being prosecuted for their crimes and indiscretions
- Martin McCreadie as Doyle, a police sergeant who works with Connor and is promoted to captain following Connor's departure from the NYPD

==== In season 1 ====
- David Wilmot as Captain Connor, an Irish police officer who dislikes Roosevelt and who tries to subvert the team's investigations at every possible turn
- Antonio Magro as Paul Kelly, a mobster who runs a brothel frequented by high society men
- Jackson Gann as Joseph, a young boy who works at a brothel and who endears himself to Moore
- Michael Ironside as J.P. Morgan, a financier and banker. He uses Connor and Byrnes as his muscle to enforce protecting his fellow members of high society.
- Sean Young as Mrs. Van Bergen, the matriarch of the fictional van Bergen family. She is generally unperturbed by rumors about her son's actions, but nonetheless is compelled by Byrnes to take action to protect him.
- Josef Altin as Willem Van Bergen, a young man who preys on prepubescent boys. He suffers from syphilis.
- Peter McRobbie as William Lafayette Strong, the mayor of New York City from 1895 to 1897. He echoes Morgan and Byrnes' concerns for the city's upper crust.
- Bill Heck as John Beecham, a former Plains resident now living in New York

==== In season 2 ====
- Matt Letscher as William Randolph Hearst, the editor of the New York Journal
- Michael McElhatton as Dr. Markoe, director of the Lying In Hospital
- Heather Goldenhersh as Matron, the head nurse at the Lying In Hospital
- Emily Barber as Violet Hayward, John's fiancée, who is Hearst's goddaughter
- Bruna Cusí as Señora Isabella Linares, the Spanish mother of a missing baby
- Brittany Marie Batchelder as Joanna Crawford, Cyrus's niece, a trained reporter who runs a seedy bar
- Georgia Lowe as Milly, another assistant to Sara at the agency
- Diego Martín as Narciso Linares, the Spanish ambassador-general
- Demetri Goritsas as Bernie Peterson, John's editor at The New York Times
- Frederick Schmidt as "Goo Goo" Knox, a street criminal who is Libby's lover
- Lara Pulver as Karen Stratten, a professor of psychology with interests similar to Kreizler's
- Gavin O'Connor as Murphy, a detective at the NYPD
- Peter Coonan as Ding Dong, a henchman of Goo Goo Knox.

== Production ==
=== Development ===
In April 2015, it was reported that Paramount Television would adapt The Alienist as an event television series in partnership with Anonymous Content. Paramount also announced that Eric Roth had come on board the project as an executive producer, as had Hossein Amini as both writer for the series and executive producer. It also announced that Cary Fukunaga would direct all the episodes and serve as an executive producer.

In May 2015, it was reported that TNT had made a deal to produce the series at $5 million per episode. In July 2015, writer and director John Sayles announced on his blog that he was joining the series as a writer. On July 21, 2015, Caleb Carr made an announcement that he was coming on board the series as a consulting producer.

In September 2016, director Jakob Verbruggen replaced Fukunaga as director due to scheduling conflicts, though Fukunaga remained an executive producer.

=== Casting ===
On November 28, 2016, it was reported that Daniel Brühl was cast as Dr. Laszlo Kreizler and Luke Evans as John Moore. Dakota Fanning was later cast as Sara Howard on January 14, 2017. On February 8, 2017, it was reported that Robert Wisdom was cast as Cyrus Montrose and Q'orianka Kilcher as Mary Palmer. Matt Lintz was cast as Stevie Taggert on February 15, 2017. On February 17, 2017, it was reported that Matthew Shear joined the cast as Lucius Isaacson. Douglas Smith was cast as Marcus Isaacson and Ted Levine as Thomas F. Byrnes on February 28, 2017. It was reported that Emanuela Postacchini was cast as Flora on March 17, 2017. On April 19, 2017, it was reported that Brian Geraghty was cast as Theodore Roosevelt.

== Episodes ==
Season	Title	Episodes	Originally released	
Season	Title	Episodes	First released	Last released
1	The Alienist	10	January 21, 2018	March 26, 2018
2	The Alienist: Angel of Darkness	8	July 19, 2020	August 9, 2020

=== Season 1 (2018) ===
No. overall	No. in season	Title	Directed by	Teleplay by	Original release date	U.S. viewers (millions)
1	1	"The Boy on the Bridge"	Jakob Verbruggen	Hossein Amini	January 21, 2018 (Note: This episode was shown as a preview on January 21, 2018, and then as the official series premiere on January 22, 2018. The viewership data is 2.09 million viewers for the official premiere on January 22, 2018.)	0.88
In 1896, alienist Laszlo Kreizler dispatches New York Times illustrator John Moore to document the body of murdered 13-year-old male prostitute Giorgio "Gloria" Santorelli on a bridge. Kreizler sees similarities between Santorelli's murder and a three-year-old case of twins Benjamin and Sofia Zweig, specifically in how Benjamin was found. He asks Moore to ask Commissioner Theodore Roosevelt's secretary Sara Howard for the twins' file. He has NYPD detective sergeants Marcus and Lucius Isaacson perform an autopsy of the twins' bodies, after the lack of sufficient findings in the file. Roosevelt talks to Paul Kelly and Biff Ellison and demands that they move out of Paresis Hall. Kreizler spots a man among the crowd and gives chase, leading to an empty building. Though nowhere to be seen, he suspects he escaped through the roof. Kreizler deduces that he must think like the killer in order to understand their motive and situation.
2	2	"A Fruitful Partnership"	Jakob Verbruggen	Hossein Amini and E. Max Frye	January 29, 2018	1.93
Kreizler inquires of a mortician if he has any knowledge of the recent victims, which he denies. Following an opera performance, Kreizler and Moore meet Roosevelt and Mayor William Lafayette Strong. Kreizler presents the possible connection between the victims; although Roosevelt is skeptical he reluctantly allows Howard to be the liaison between him and Kreizler's team. The Isaacson twins determine that a butcher knife, an Arkansas Toothpick, was used to sever Giorgio's body parts, which they present at a dinner gathering with Kreizler, Moore and Howard present. Moore shows skepticism to Howard's expanded role and walks home in protest after Kreizler puts him in place. Moore decides to investigate the brothel, where he gets drunk while talking to Ellison. He makes inquiries of Sally, who reveals that Giorgio was at the brothel the day he was killed, with someone dubbed "Silver Smile"; but never left the place on his own. Moore becomes unable to move, suffering from the effects of something put in his drink by Ellison.
3	3	"Silver Smile"	Jakob Verbruggen	Gina Gionfriddo	February 5, 2018	1.64
Stevie saves Moore and brings him back to Kreizler's residence. Moore does not remember much about what happened but denies that he went to the brothel for reasons other than inquiries. Byrnes informs Mr. and Mrs. Van Bergen about sightings of their son, Willem, near the brothel. Moore begins to regain his memories over time, recounting the information Sally told him to Kreizler before he passed out. He brings Kreizler to Sally, who tells them that they always trust their customers. Kreizler notes that the killer must have been someone Giorgio trusted. Kreizler has Cyrus revisit the feelings of killing before his trial. Another boy is found on the roof of Castle Garden. The Isaacson twins determine that the killer used the same knife as on Giorgio. Roosevelt holds off Conner's forces for a few hours before Steffens breaks the news to Connor. Howard deduces a pattern which includes heights and areas near or with water.
4	4	"These Bloody Thoughts"	James Hawes	Gina Gionfriddo and Cary Joji Fukunaga	February 12, 2018	1.68
The Isaacson twins discover pitons at the bottom of the walls of the old immigration centre, noting that the killer climbed up to the roof. Kreizler visits a former patient in order to understand the psyche of the killer. She tells him that the killer likely acted against something they experienced before. Feeling sorry for Mary, Moore decides to take her to the movies. Connor discovers Moore's illustration book, and Roosevelt has Howard deliver it to Kreizler, who in turn returns it to Moore. Moore and Marcus visit The Golden Rule, where they inquire about Ali ibn-Ghazi, a Syrian boy who was murdered. Another boy there, Joseph, tells them that the customer was considered a saint. Moore advises him to stay away from the customer. Byrnes orders Mrs. Van Bergen to take action to protect her son. Kreizler, Moore, Howard and the Isaacson twins are summoned to a meeting point by the killer, after Mrs. Santorelli receives a letter from the killer. Kreizler deduces that they are being watched, but the killer is out and luring in new victims.
5	5	"Hildebrandt's Starling"	James Hawes	E. Max Frye	February 19, 2018	1.59
Kreizler and his team build a profile of the killer, but he has an outburst after Howard suggests that an abusive mother could equally have played a role with the killer. Kreizler and Moore visit Jesse Pomeroy, who also killed children, in prison to learn more about why he mutilated his victims. His answer remains vague, and he mocks then attempts to attack Kreizler. Kreizler then seeks advice from a former professor/mentor about how to accept contradictions. Roosevelt has Howard look through files for people who could match the killer's profile. She presents two candidates to Kreizler, a 29- and a 33-year-old male. Kreizler deduces it to be Willem Van Bergen and tells Roosevelt. Roosevelt orders Connor to find the address, but upon arrival deduces that Connor tricked him and has Connor's captain's badge and gun removed. After making an inquiry to a pastor, at whose church Willem helped with homeless children, Kreizler learns that all the murders happened on holy days in the Christian calendar.
6	6	"Ascension"	Paco Cabezas	E. Max Frye	February 26, 2018	1.73
Kreizler and his team put a secret operation into motion, with Stevie being used as bait to lure the killer at another brothel. They also explain the connection to the Christian calendar to Roosevelt. The first stakeout is unsuccessful, with no one matching the killer's profile taking the bait. Kreizler begins to consider that he may have misinterpreted the clue, but Howard reassures Moore that the killer could strike at the next Christian holy day, Pentecost. Howard uncovers an old article about Kreizler's parents, and uses it to confront him during the second operation, about his alleged deformed arm. He insists on keeping it private, but she doesn't relent, ending with him slapping her in the face. Connor is informed about the Van Bergen's planned move of Willem to Buenos Aires, and with Doyle tries to stop Willem as he attempts to escape. They corner Willem on a bridge and Connor, in a rage, shoots him dead. They dump his body in a bag into the river. Both Moore and Marcus are distracted when the killer approaches Stevie at the brothel, but the killer loses interest just as they refocus on Stevie, leading to a pursuit. The killer manages to injure Cyrus in the process. Another body is left under the Statue of Liberty.
7	7	"Many Sainted Men"	Paco Cabezas	John Sayles	March 5, 2018	1.65
The body of Rosie, which was found under the Statue of Liberty, is discovered to have different telltale signs than previous. Most notably that in addition to the heart, one eye was removed. Roosevelt states that he had witnessed something similar in the West. Kreizler redeems his behaviour against the people in his household, apologizing to Cyrus and Stevie and asking Mary to have dinner with him, leading to them sharing a kiss. Sara visits Blackwell's Island regarding a possible patient who matches the killer's profile. The warden redirects her to St. Elizabeth's, explaining that it is a government owned mental hospital for soldiers with mental issues. Moore and Kreizler are abducted by Connor, and Byrnes brings them in front of Bishop Potter and J. P. Morgan. Potter orders them to abandon their investigation, while Morgan expresses support for the case to be solved. However, Kreizler turns down an offer of economic help from him. Moore confronts Kreizler about his slapping Sara, putting their friendship on the line. Moore is later beaten by an angered Connor in the alleyway of a bar.
8	8	"Psychopathia Sexualis"	David Petrarca	John Sayles	March 12, 2018	1.80
Kreizler and Moore travel to Washington DC to further investigate their possible killer. Moore visits the library while Kreizler makes inquiries at St. Elizabeth, only to learn that their suspect died four months prior. However, another doctor there mentions another person matching their profile, a John Beecham. The Isaacson twins travel out west to talk to Beecham's former commander, who tells them that he found Beecham naked in an alley, stabbing the body of a dead boy. Howard travels to Adam Dury's hometown, where she discovers the home had burned down, she also discovers an old box. Kreizler and Moore visit Massachusetts, where Dury now resides. He tells them that he entrusted an older peer to look after his brother, Japheth, who suffered from a facial tic. He reveals that it was Beecham, not John, but George. On their way back, Kreizler and Moore's carriage is ambushed, but they escape through the forest. Back in New York, Connor and Doyle break into Kreizler's home, subduing Stevie and Cyrus, before Cyrus manages to strike back. Mary fights Connor, but she is pushed through a balustrade to her death.
9	9	"Requiem"	Jamie Payne	Hossein Amini	March 19, 2018	1.71
A funeral is held and Mary is buried, after which Kreizler decides to withdraw from the investigation, spending time mourning the loss of Mary. Sara Howard convinces Moore to continue the investigation without Kreizler and with the help of the Isaacson twins, they visit the Census Bureau office to get the address of John Beecham. Howard discovers that Beecham used to work at the bureau before he was fired due to a complaint from parents of a 12-year-old girl. The Isaacson twins interview the girl, but she insists they were only friends. In addition, Howard and the team have a new place to work from. One night, Connor threatens Sara Howard. Moore realizes a pattern for the victims: they were all beaten, hated their parents or the volunteers who tried to help them and all lived in poverty. The team also discover that Beecham collected debt from Ali's father, and discover his actual residence where they uncover collections of body parts. Moore learns from Joseph that a friend of Joseph's has met the presumed killer. Later that night, the killer traps both Joseph and his friend Maxie at the swimming pool. Joseph manages to hide after stumbling upon the killer toying with Maxie's body, but despite his hiding, the killer still finds him.
10	10	"Castle in the Sky"	Jamie Payne	Cary Joji Fukunaga & John Sayles & Chase Palmer	March 26, 2018	1.84
Moore rushes to the scene of the most recent murder and is relieved it's not Joseph. He expresses concerns about Joseph's whereabouts to Sara Howard before they share a kiss. Kreizler asks Howard for forgiveness and they share their parental traumas. After having looked at the crime scene and the surrounding area, including Beecham's residence, Kreizler rejoins the investigation. Howard and the team discover that Beecham utilized the sewage system to navigate to the different locations. The team sets their sights on Beecham striking again on Nativity of Saint John the Baptist, and Sara Howard deduces the High Bridge Tower as the location. Following an opera right before the apprehension, Kreizler tells Moore that the location is wrong, and leads him to the Croton Distributing Reservoir, where they find Joseph, but are knocked out by Beecham. Kreizler tries to talk to Beecham when he awakens, but he is shot by Connor. Sara Howard arrives and shoots Connor in self-defense after he taunts her, killing him. Beecham dies of his injuries. Roosevelt gives Connor a medal of honor in his memory, and Kreizler visits his father, telling him what he was both right and wrong about his life.

=== Season 2: Angel of Darkness (2020) ===
No. overall	No. in season	Title	Directed by	Teleplay by	Original release date	U.S. viewers (millions)
11	1	"Ex Ore Infantium"	David Caffrey	Stuart Carolan	July 19, 2020	1.33
A year following the events of the first season, Sara Howard now runs her own detective agency, while John Moore is engaged to Violet Hayward. Kreizler visits Martha Napp, who is facing the electric chair after her baby goes missing and it is alleged that she killed it. The execution is witnessed by the trio, and Napp is executed despite Howard's desperate protests. She and her agency are called in when the baby daughter of the Spanish consul-general, Narciso Linares, is kidnapped, with a doll left in her stead. Howard and Moore call in Kreizler when another baby is found in a Siegel Cooper store. The Isacsson twins determine her to have been poisoned, and Kreizler confirms the baby to be Napp's. Kreizler concludes that the killer is hiding from his own darkness, and Howard adds that he must have done so to be able to love.
12	2	"Something Wicked"	David Caffrey	Stuart Carolan	July 19, 2020	1.10
Kreizler attends a seminar where he, with Moore present, confronts Dr. Markoe of the Lying In Hospital about Napp and her now deceased baby. Markoe denies the accusations and discredits Kreizler before talking to Byrnes about dealing with Kreizler and his team. Byrnes attempts to blackmail Lucius into sharing information with him about the investigation. Moore and Howard venture into a dangerous neighbourhood following a lead on where the doll from the Siegel Cooper was bought to, coming near to a confrontation with Goo Goo Knox and his gang. Moore later makes a deal to talk to Knox himself, but after being cornered, is saved by Sara Howard. Knox denies any knowledge of the property they investigated or the babies. Kreizler presents hypnosis as an option to help Isabella Linares, but she rejects it, prompting protest from Howard. Doyle has her arrested on Byrnes recommendation following a body discovery at the docks, but Howard and Kreizler stop him, arguing diplomatic immunity, which he relents to.
13	3	"Labyrinth"	Clare Kilner	Gina Gionfriddo	July 26, 2020	0.99
Sara Howard decides to try hypnosis herself before allowing Linares to try it. Through a friend of Moore, Ogden Gildersleeve, Howard manages to get inside the Lying-In Hospital to talk to Dr. Markoe and his staff. A nurse, Libby Hatch, reveals that Napp changed rooms before her death. She also obtains Napp's file for Howard. Howard further discovers that the matron sometimes kept babies at her home to take care of and a neighbor reveals that the matron couldn't have her own children. Libby reassures her that the matron is incapable of killing. Lucius tells Marcus about Byrnes' blackmailing. Linares has two attempts of hypnosis, the first partially failing, before Kreizler and his team call on Cecilia Beaux to assist Linares with painting what she sees. Linares notes a feeling of being watched, specifically by a woman, confirming their suspicion that the killer is a woman who is possibly coping for the loss of her child. Kreizler and his team also attend Moore's bachelor party prior to his planned wedding with Violet Hayward.
14	4	"Gilded Cage"	Clare Kilner	Alyson Feltes	July 26, 2020	0.90
Howard tasks Bitsy Sussman to go undercover as a nurse at the Lying-In Hospital to learn more about Napp's baby and find the poison identified by the Isacsson twins. Kreizler and Howard decide to use the opportunity to confront Richard Osgood at Moore's engagement party. Following a disagreement about the Linares case, William Randolph Hearst humiliates Moore in his speech to the guests, with his goddaughter Violet following suit. Moore dismisses Sara Howard's concerns about it. Osgood reveals to Kreizler that Colleen Ledwidge can have a temper and could possibly have kidnapped the babies. Helen Sumner, a patient from the hospital, spoils the party before Markoe takes her out. Sussman uncovers the poison, but is almost compromised by Ledwidge. Upon asking further questions about Napp, Ledwidge snaps at her and chases her into a room with Libby, who sedates her. Linares remembers who she saw at the park, identifying Libby as the kidnapper. Kreizler and his team rush to the hospital, in time for Sussman to unlock the door and let Ledwidge in. The Isacssons are able to awaken Sussman again. Libby flees to the matron's house, where she kills her in retaliation for her treatment of her.
15	5	"Belly of the Beast"	Clare Kilner	Gina Gionfriddo & Karina Wolf	August 2, 2020	1.13
Byrnes warns Dr. Markoe that he will come after him himself for taking babies away from their mothers at the Lying-In Hospital. Sara Howard and Lucius visit the matron's home after he overhears Markoe's concerns about her not showing up to work. They discover her body and call on the rest of the team, concluding that her death was an act of revenge by Libby. Ledwidge identifies Libby for the police. Libby leaves a warning at Sara Howard's office, prompting Moore to have Sara stay at his home until Libby's eventual arrest. Realizing they have little time to rescue the Linares baby, Sara Howard goes rogue in an attempt to find her and is assisted by Cyrus' niece Joanna to find Goo Goo Knox, who is revealed to be Libby's lover. Howard arrives at Knox's property on Hudson Street and searches it for the Linares baby. She is held at gunpoint by Libby, before throwing ashes in her face and escaping. Howard finds the baby just as Moore arrives. Kreizler is held up by Knox's goon Fat Jack, who is stopped by Marcus. The baby is returned safely to the Linares. The day after the rescue, Howard and Moore share an intimate interlude.
16	6	"Memento Mori"	David Caffrey	Alyson Feltes	August 2, 2020	0.83
Hearst publishes articles portraying Sara Howard as an unusual person in an attempt to get Moore more devoted to Violet. Sara Howard remains determined to find Libby and to prevent another kidnapping. Kreizler takes Paulie to see a performance by Harry Houdini, but when he comes back to the institute, he finds Paulie hanging, in a botched attempt to recreate a Houdini trick. Markoe and the Byrnes take on an investigation into the matter and the state's medical board agrees to temporarily suspend Kreizler. Howard and Moore search Knox's property again, discovering the room where Libby kept the babies; also finding belongings to several families, notably the Vanderbilts, whose baby son is later kidnapped. Cornelius Vanderbilt brings in Hearst and Byrnes to investigate, but also summons Sara Howard, having been impressed by her previous successful cases. He also puts her in charge of the investigation, much to the dismay of Hearst and Byrnes. Together with Kreizler, they decipher clues from Sara's encounter with Libby in order to understand her past and childhood. Libby and Knox decide to flee New York, later taking shelter with the Vanderbilt baby on a rooftop in Brooklyn for the night.
17	7	"Last Exit to Brooklyn"	David Caffrey	Tom Smuts & Amy Berg	August 9, 2020	1.04
Byrnes asks a favour of Fat Jack, one of Knox's goons, and offers money for the baby to be returned. Knox seemingly agrees to it, but later changes his mind. Hearst confronts Moore about his lack of care for Violet, while the latter also grows frustrated with Sara's uncertainty of their possible relationship. Sara Howard, Kreizler, Moore and Byrnes question Libby's mother, Mallory Hunter, who Libby had attempted to murder when she was younger. Kreizler deduces that she took away Libby's child and fabricated a fight between them, and that she gave herself a scar. Hearst and Byrnes lure Libby out of hiding by the former releasing pictures of her daughter in the papers. She goes to see her baby Clara herself, but gets spotted. In her escape, she kills Doyle after he corners her. Libby confronts Sara at her office, but is tackled by Moore. She gets the upper hand and uses broken glass to hold him as a hostage, while Sara retrieves her gun and points it at her.
18	8	"Better Angels"	David Caffrey	Stuart Carolan & Karina Wolf	August 9, 2020	0.95
Libby demands to see her daughter, Clara, and her location, which Howard refuses to give before she starts cutting Moore's throat. Her answer distracts Libby and Moore tackles her again, and she is arrested by the police. Byrnes attempts interrogating her with torture tactics, which backfires. He points to Kreizler to try, but he convinces Howard to do it, as Libby knows her. She manages to get the Vanderbilt baby's location from her, by deceiving for her to see Clara. Knox arrives with his men and massacres the police station, escaping with Libby and heading to the Kreizler institute to find Clara. In their search, Knox shoots Marcus in the process, who dies of his injuries. Moore, Byrnes and the police find the baby alive and well. Some time later Sara, Kreizler and the team deduce that Libby found her happiness in her past, and with Clara has finished her ideal family. Together with Byrnes and the police, they converge on Libby's childhood home. Sara, Moore and Kreizler sneak inside and Knox stops them before he is killed by Lucius. Sara and Kreizler convince Libby to give up Clara before Byrnes and the police come in and arrest her. Moore is promoted and learns that Violet is pregnant. Kreizler decides to travel to Vienna with Karen Stratton, and Howard and her detective agency welcome their newest member: Kitty Byrnes.

== Broadcast ==
International rights for the series were acquired by Netflix.

== Reception ==
=== Critical response ===
On review aggregator Rotten Tomatoes, the first season has an approval rating of 67% based on 78 reviews, with an average rating of 6.86/10; the site's consensuses states, "The Alienist boasts an impressive cast and superb production design, but a sluggish pace and too many tropes keep it from truly standing out in an overcrowded genre." On Metacritic, the first season has a weighted average score of 61 out of 100, based on 26 critics, indicating "generally favorable reviews".

In the second season, Rotten Tomatoes has an approval rating of 81% based on 16 reviews, with an average rating of 7.03/10; the site's consensuses states, "Tense and thrilling, if not terribly distinct, Angel of Darkness takes The Alienist in a darker direction while giving the superb Dakota Fanning more time to shine." On Metacritic, the second season has a weighted average score of 55 out of 100, based on 5 critics, indicating "mixed or average reviews".

=== Ratings ===
==== Overall ====
Viewership and ratings per season of The Alienist
Season	Episodes	First aired		Last aired		Avg. viewers (millions)
Season	Episodes	Date	Viewers (millions)	Date	Viewers (millions)	Avg. viewers (millions)
1	10	January 21, 2018	0.88	March 26, 2018	1.84	1.64
2	8	July 19, 2020	1.33	August 9, 2020	0.95	0.83

==== Season 1 ====
Viewership and ratings per episode of The Alienist
No.	Title	Air date	Rating (18–49)	Viewers (millions)	DVR (18–49)	DVR viewers (millions)	Total (18–49)	Total viewers (millions)
1	"The Boy on the Bridge"	January 21, 2018	0.2	0.88	—N/a	—N/a	—N/a	—N/a
2	"A Fruitful Partnership"	January 29, 2018	0.5	1.93	0.5	1.93	1.0	3.86
3	"Silver Smile"	February 5, 2018	0.4	1.64	0.6	1.80	1.0	3.44
4	"These Bloody Thoughts"	February 12, 2018	0.4	1.68	—N/a	—N/a	—N/a	—N/a
5	"Hildebrandt's Starling"	February 19, 2018	0.4	1.59	—N/a	—N/a	—N/a	—N/a
6	"Ascension"	February 26, 2018	0.5	1.73	0.4	1.77	0.9	3.50
7	"Many Sainted Men"	March 5, 2018	0.4	1.65	0.5	1.88	0.9	3.53
8	"Psychopathia Sexualis"	March 12, 2018	0.4	1.80	0.5	1.73	0.9	3.53
9	"Requiem"	March 19, 2018	0.4	1.71	0.5	1.87	0.9	3.57
10	"Castle in the Sky"	March 26, 2018	0.4	1.84	0.5	1.67	0.9	3.51

==== Season 2 ====
Viewership and ratings per episode of The Alienist
No.	Title	Air date	Rating (18–49)	Viewers (millions)	DVR (18–49)	DVR viewers (millions)	Total (18–49)	Total viewers (millions)
1	"Ex Ore Infantium"	July 19, 2020	0.3	1.33	0.2	1.19	0.5	2.52
2	"Something Wicked"	July 19, 2020	0.2	1.10	0.2	1.13	0.4	2.23
3	"Labyrinth"	July 26, 2020	0.2	0.99	0.2	1.14	0.4	2.13
4	"Gilded Cage"	July 26, 2020	0.2	0.90	0.2	1.27	0.4	2.17
5	"Belly of the Beast"	August 2, 2020	0.3	1.13	0.2	1.16	0.5	2.29
6	"Memento Mori"	August 2, 2020	0.2	0.83	0.2	1.25	0.4	2.08
7	"Last Exit to Brooklyn"	August 9, 2020	0.2	1.04	TBD	TBD	TBD	TBD
8	"Better Angels"	August 9, 2020	0.2	0.95	TBD	TBD	TBD	TBD

=== Accolades ===
Year	Award	Category	Nominee(s)	Result	Ref.
2018	Primetime Emmy Awards	Outstanding Cinematography for a Limited Series or Movie	PJ Dillon (for "The Boy on the Bridge")	Nominated	
2018	Primetime Emmy Awards	Outstanding Limited Series	The Alienist	Nominated	
2018	Primetime Emmy Awards	Outstanding Main Title Design	Angus Wall, Lisa Bolan, Yongsub Song, Charles Khoury, Heidi Berg, Felix Soletic	Nominated	
2018	Primetime Emmy Awards	Outstanding Period Costumes	Michael Kaplan, Rudy Mance, Beáta Merkovits, Andrew Hunt (for "A Fruitful Partnership")	Nominated	
2018	Primetime Emmy Awards	Outstanding Production Design for a Narrative Period or Fantasy Program (One Hour or More)	Mara LePere-Schloop, Bill Crutcher, Karl Probert, Alice Baker (for "The Boy on the Bridge")	Nominated	
2018	Primetime Emmy Awards	Outstanding Special Visual Effects in a Supporting Role	Kent Houston, Wendy Garfinkle, Tim Barter, Rasik Gorecha, Martin Lake, Doug Larmour, Alison Griffiths, Steve Murgatroyd, Harin Hirani (for "The Boy on the Bridge")	Won	
2018	Saturn Awards	Best Action-Thriller Television Series	The Alienist	Nominated	
2018	Saturn Awards	Best Supporting Actress on Television	Dakota Fanning	Nominated	
2018	Golden Trailer Awards	Best Drama TV Spot (Trailer/Teaser) for a Series	TNT, Zealot (for "Game")	Nominated	
2018	Golden Trailer Awards	Best Horror/Thriller TV Spot (Trailer/Teaser) for a Series	TNT, Trailer Park, Inc. (for "Monster" Trailer)	Nominated	
2019	Art Directors Guild Awards	Excellence in Production Design for a Television Movie or Limited Series	Mara LePere-Schloop, Karl Probert, Bill Crutcher, Robert Cowper, Zsuzsanna Borvendég, et al. (Note: Also: Bence Erdelyi, Gergely Rieger, James F. Truesdale, Andres Cubillan, Biljana Jovanovic, Rumiko Ishii, Borbála Debreczeni, Gergö Kukucska, Kristof Pataricza, Dániel Miklós, Levente Sulyok, Beáta Vavrinecz, Chris Yoo, Craig Gilroy, Claudio Campana, Nicole Reed LeFevre, Noelle King, Adele Plauche, Molly Mikula, Trinh Vu, Jim Stanes, Gemma Kingsley, Agnes Maza, Karolina Pintér, Gabor Szabo, Vincent Morin, Linda Bándi, László Tibor Erdélyi, Sándor Jani, Zsolt Ilia, Julian Scalia, Alice Baker, Philip Murphy, Holly Thurman, Zsuzsanna Sipos, Adam Polgar, Mark Molnar, Gaspar Gombos, David Metzger)	Won	
2019	British Academy Television Craft Awards	Best Special, Visual & Graphic Effects	Kent Houston, Asa Shoul, Peerless, Freefolk	Nominated	
2019	Golden Globe Awards	Best Actor – Miniseries or Television Film	Daniel Brühl	Nominated	
2019	Golden Globe Awards	Best Miniseries or Television Film	The Alienist	Nominated	
2019	Satellite Awards	Best Actor in a Miniseries or TV Film	Daniel Brühl	Nominated	
2019	Satellite Awards	Best Actress in a Miniseries or TV Film	Dakota Fanning	Nominated	
2019	Visual Effects Society Awards	Outstanding Supporting Visual Effects in a Photoreal Episode	Kent Houston, Wendy Garfinkle, Steve Murgatroyd, Drew Jones, Paul Stephenson (for "The Boy on the Bridge")	Nominated	
2019	Costume Designers Guild Awards	Excellence in Period Television	Michael Kaplan	Nominated	
2019	MPSE Golden Reel Awards	Outstanding Achievement in Sound Editing – Episodic Short Form – Music	Andrew Glen, Alistair Hawkins, and Fiona Cruickshank (for "A Fruitful Partnership")	Nominated	
2019	ICG Publicists Awards	Maxwell Weinberg Publicist Showmanship Television Award	Gabriela Zapata	Nominated	
2021	Art Directors Guild Awards	Excellence in Production Design for a Television Movie or Limited Series	Ruth Ammon	Nominated	
2021	MPSE Golden Reel Awards	Outstanding Achievement in Sound Editing – Episodic Short Form – Effects/Foley	Matthew Skelding, Al Sirkett, Tom Jenkins, Mathias Schuster, Barnaby Smyth (for "Belly of the Beast")	Nominated	
2021	MPSE Golden Reel Awards	Outstanding Achievement in Sound Editing – Episodic Short Form – Music	Alistair Hawkins (for "Belly of the Beast")	Nominated	
2021	Canadian Cinema Editors Awards	Best Editing in TV Drama	Jay Prychidny and Liyana Mansor (for "Gilded Cage")	Nominated	
