= Annie Walsh =

American outlaw (fl. 1870–1880)

Battle Annie
- Born: Annie Walsh
- Occupation: Outlaw
- Known for: Hell's Kitchen personality known as the "Queen of Hell's Kitchen" and leader of the female contingent of the Gopher Gang during the 1870s.

Annie Walsh (fl. 1870–1880), known under the pseudonym Battle Annie, was an American outlaw and member of the Gopher Gang. A well-known outlaw figure described in the press as "The Queen of Hell's Kitchen" and "the most feared brick hurler of her time", she was the founder and longtime leader of the gang's female auxiliary, the Lady Gophers, headquartered at Mallet Murphy's Battle Row saloon where they were officially known as the Battle Row Ladies' Social and Athletic Club. She was able to assemble a force from 50 up to several hundred women who, armed with clubs, were used as reserve members in gang fights against rival gangs and police. Walsh and her group were also hired out by businesses and labor unions throughout a number of violent labor disputes during the 1870s. She appears as a minor character in the 2003 historical novel A Passionate Girl by Thomas J. Fleming.
