= Battle Row Ladies' Social and Athletic Club =

Gang of women in New York

The Battle Row Ladies' Social and Athletic Club, also known as the Lady Gophers, was a gang of women who were affiliated with the Gopher Gang in Hell's Kitchen. It was one of the first "women's auxiliaries" to a New York gang. The group was led by Battle Annie and members were considered just a "vicious as their male counterparts." The group gave martial arts lessons.

When the group was active in the late nineteenth and early twentieth century, they were notable for being the largest group of women gang members at the time. Battle Annie hired out members of her gang to fight for both trade unions and strikebreakers. Battle Annie often encouraged women in her group to use "more strenuous activity with teeth and nails."
