= The Italian Secretary =

2005 novel by Caleb Carr

- First edition
- Author: Caleb Carr
- Audio read by: Simon Prebble
- Language: English
- Genre: Detective & Mystery novel
- Publisher: Carroll & Graf
- Publication date: 2005
- Publication place: United States
- Media type: Print
- Pages: 256
- ISBN: 0-7867-1548-0
- OCLC: 58804944
- Dewey Decimal: 813/.54 22
- LC Class: PS3553.A76277 I86 2005

The Italian Secretary is a mystery novel by Caleb Carr featuring Sherlock Holmes and Dr. Watson. This literary pastiche had the approval of the Arthur Conan Doyle estate having originally been commissioned as a short story for the collection Ghosts of Baker Street which then expanded into a novel.

== Plot summary ==
Architect Sir Alistair Sinclair and his foreman, Dennis McKay, have been slain in the midst of rehabilitating the medieval west tower of the Royal Palace of Holyrood—the very wing where Mary, Queen of Scots, had lived, and where David Rizzio had met his brutal, politically motivated end. Mycroft Holmes fears these murders portend new threats against Britain's present monarch—the elderly Queen Victoria, who occasionally lodges at the palace—by a known assassin, perhaps in nefarious league with the German Kaiser. En route north, Holmes and Watson are menaced aboard their train by a red-bearded bomb thrower (supposedly a rabid Scots nationalist), only to discover that still greater dangers await them, and others, at Holyroodhouse. The plaintive drone of a weeping woman, cruelly punctured and shattered corpses, a pool of blood "that never dries", and a disembodied Italian voice with unexpected musical tastes all imply the wrath of wraiths behind recent atrocities. But Holmes and Watson deduce that greed, rather than ghosts, may be to blame.

== Characters in The Italian Secretary ==
- Sherlock Holmes
- John H. Watson M.D.
- Mycroft Holmes

== Release details ==
- 2005, United States, publisher ISBN 0-7867-1548-0, Pub date 2005, binding

== Reception ==
Geoff Nicholson, writing for The New York Times, called the action "rip-roaring stuff" and called it "good honest hokum." Colin Greenland of The Guardian praised Carr's characterization of Sherlock Holmes and Mycroft but found the book longwinded at times, saying "Carr's version reproduces superbly the peculiar éclat of Holmes's often absurd but spectacularly correct "deductions", though he's a terrible windbag. The mystery isn't much of a mystery, and it's interrupted far too much by explanations of things Doyle could take as read: who Mary Queen of Scots was, for instance." Publishers Weekly found the book underwhelming compared to earlier efforts saying "while the novel captivates, it matches neither of Carr's previous megasellers in plot invention or depth of character." Kirkus Reviews also criticized the book saying "It’s fun for about a hundred pages, because Carr apes Conan Doyle’s plummy storyteller’s voice quite ably...But the successive disclosures become increasingly preposterous."
