= John J. O'Connell (police officer) =

- Born: 1884; Manhattan, New York, United States
- Died: October 18, 1946 (aged 62); Manhattan, New York
- Occupation: Police officer
- Employer: New York City Police Department
- Known for: NYPD police detective who headed the NYPD Police Academy from 1930 to 1942 and was Chief Inspector from 1942 to 1945.
- Spouse: Helen O'Connell
- Children: John O'Connell, Jr.

John J. O'Connell (1884 – October 18, 1946) was an American law enforcement officer and police inspector with the New York City Police Department. A noted detective sergeant during his early police career, he later served as head of the NYPD Police Academy from 1930 to 1942 and Chief Inspector from 1942 until his retirement in 1945.

== Biography ==
John O'Connell was born on the Lower East Side of Manhattan in 1884 and attended St. Augustine's Parochial School and La Salle Academy. He was a stenographer prior to joining the New York City Police Department on September 15, 1905. He made detective sergeant in 1912 and received several commendations by the department for bravery in the line of duty. Much of his early years on the force was spent in undercover work.

On one of the occasions, he led a squad to arrest gang chieftains Owney Madden and Tanner Smith at their headquarters known as the Winona Club. The gangsters were warned by one of their informants and had barricaded themselves in the building by the time O'Connell and his men had arrived. When O'Connell knocked on the door with his club, a gun was fired out a window with the shot "grazing a police officer's skull". The detective sergeant then ordered his men to withdraw around a corner and sent two patrolmen to gain entry to the building from the rear while the rest of the squad were marched across the street in full view of the gang. O'Connell approached the club once again and began arguing with Madden and Tanner, and while the rest of the gang crowded around the front windows to watch their leaders taunt the police, a rear window was left unguarded allowing the two patrolmen to sneak into the building.

The officers crept through the house until reaching the front room here the gang had gathered. They then rushed the gangsters in a surprise attack and the startled men were forced back momentarily. O'Connor immediately had his men break down the doors and within 15 minutes had placed all of the men under arrest and put them "handcuffed and bleeding" in a paddy wagon to a nearby precinct. Both Madden and Tanner received light punishments and were allowed to see Mayor William J. Gaynor who convinced him that the police had used excessive force and claimed they had been arrested during a card game. Gaynor then passed "Order No. 7" which prohibited a police officer to use of his club "unless he was prepared to prove that it was in defense of his life".

He was made a police lieutenant in 1920 and then a captain eight years later. In 1929, he was appointed a deputy police inspector and then head of the NYPD Police Academy the next year. He established the technical research laboratory during his time at the academy and directed the wartime coordination between civilian defense groups and law enforcement agencies. O'Connell was also the author of several books on police practice and procedure which were later adopted as standard textbooks for law enforcement training. His best known work, "Modern Criminal Investigation" (1935), was co-written with Harry Söderman and outlined early scientific and psychological methods of crime detection.

In 1941, he became assistant Chief Inspector. He left the police academy when he was appointed Chief Police Inspector by then Police Commissioner Lewis Valentine on July 7, 1942. He remained chief inspector for three years until his retirement in 1945. After a long illness, he died at Doctors Hospital on October 18, 1946. He was survived by his wife Helen, his son John Jr. and two grandchildren.
