= Rhodes Gang =

- Founded: c. 1890
- Founding location: Hell's Kitchen, New York
- Years active: 1890s–1910s
- Territory: Manhattan
- Ethnicity: Irish-American
- Membership (est.): ?
- Criminal activities: Burglary, armed robbery, street muggings, assault, strikebreaking.
- Allies: Gopher Gang
- Rivals: Parlor Mob; The Gorillas

The Rhodes Gang was an American street gang based in New York City at the turn of the 20th century. The group was one of several smaller Hell's Kitchen gangs affiliated with the Gopher Gang, all of whom were almost constantly fighting among each other, among these including The Gorillas and the Parlor Mob. They were known, at times, to briefly put aside their differences when police attempted to interfere in gang fights and authorities found the area impossible to control.

The membership of the Rhodes Gang, like many other rival gangs, quickly dropped following the breakup of the Gophers by railroad detectives of the New York Central Railroad in 1910. The New York Police Department soon began efforts to rid the city of the remaining street gangs and, by 1916, the Rhodes Gang and the other Manhattan-based gangs had disbanded permanently.

The gang was referenced in the historical novels A Long Line of Dead Men: A Matthew Scudder Mystery (1999) by Lawrence Block and Michael Walsh's And All the Saints: A Novel (2003).
