= Casing the Promised Land =

1980 novel by Caleb Carr

- First edition cover
- Author: Caleb Carr
- Publisher: HarperCollins
- Publication date: January 1, 1980
- ISBN: 978-0-060-10707-9

Casing the Promised Land is a novel written by the American novelist Caleb Carr. Published by Harper & Row in 1980, it was Carr's first published book, having already published several non-fiction newspaper and magazine pieces.

Acknowledging the amateur nature of the work in 1999, Carr posted the following notice on Amazon.com: "I am the author of this book. It has a few good scenes, but is essentially 'roman à clef' nonsense that every writer has to get out of his system early on. Do yourself a favor and read ANYTHING else I've written (you'll be doing me a favor, too). Forgive the follies of youth."
