= St. Luke's School (Manhattan) =

School in New York City

Coordinates: 40°43′57.52″N 74°0′24.32″W

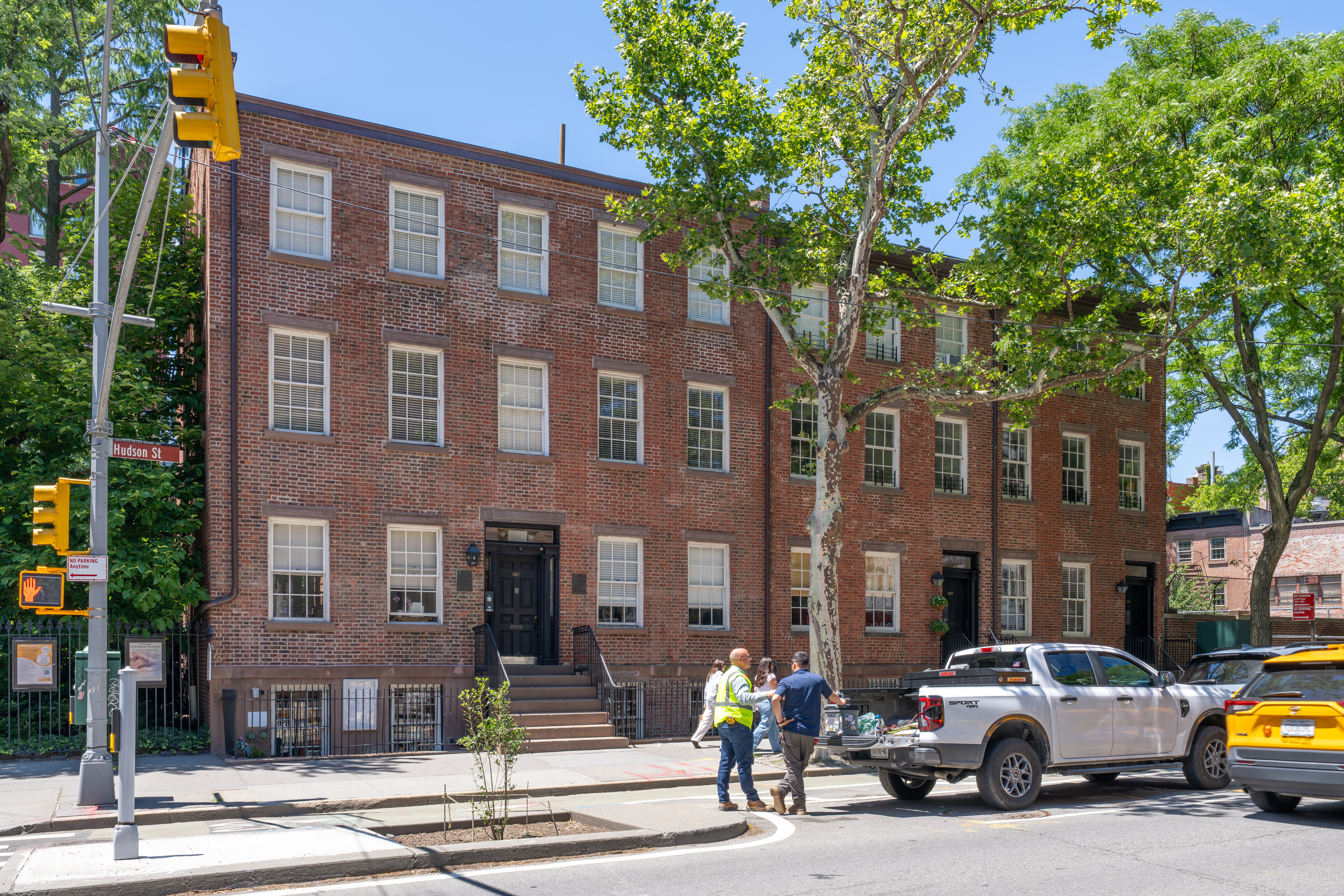

Information
- Established: 1945; 81 years ago
- Upper School Head: Amy Francisco
- Lower School Head: Karina Otoya-Knapp
- Head of school: Tracy Fedonchik
- Grades: Junior Kindergarten - Grade 8
- Enrollment: 340 (2021-2022)
- Average class size: 18-20
- Student to teacher ratio: 7:1

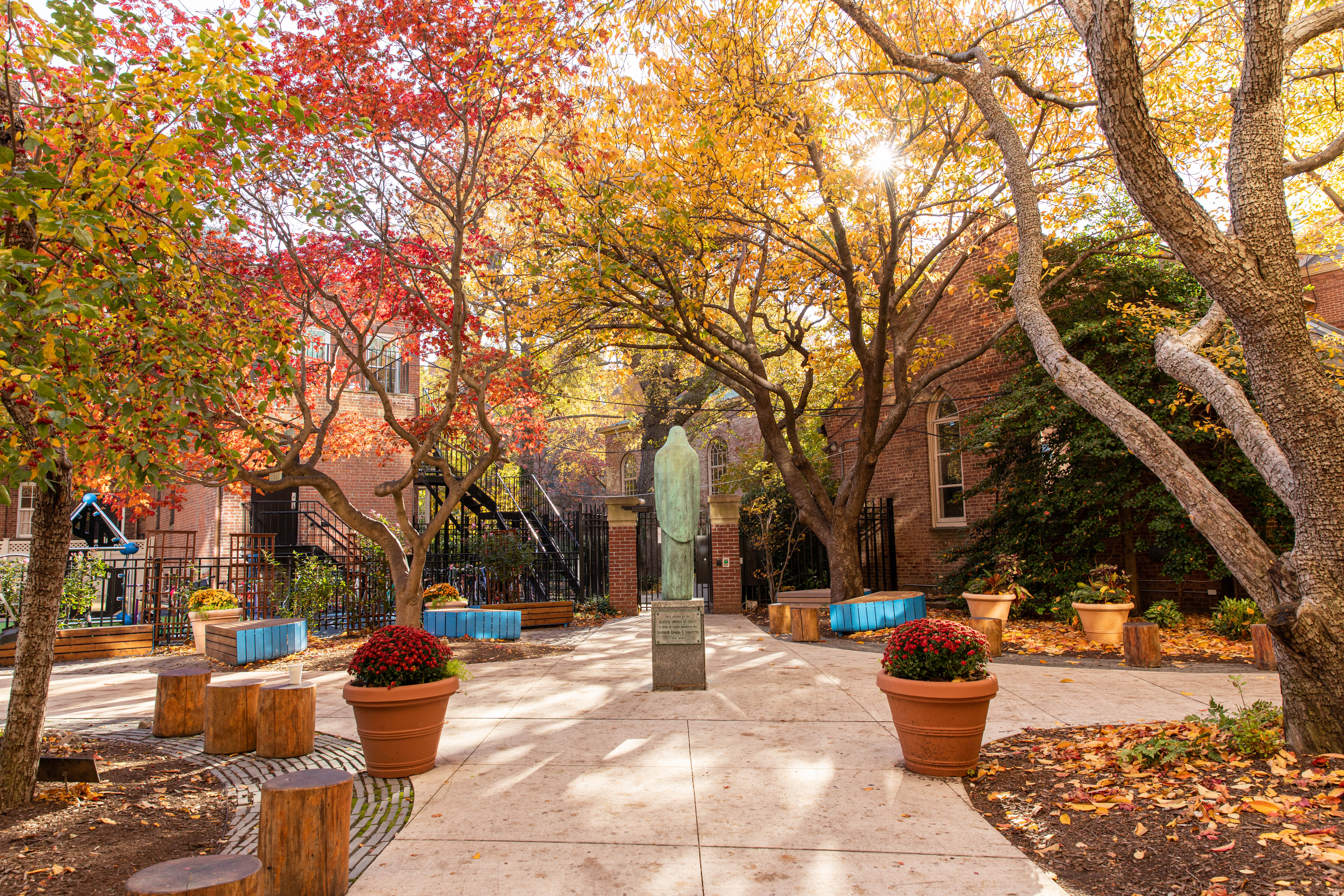
A statue of Mother Mary serves as a central point of the school's courtyard.

St. Luke's School is a coeducational elementary and middle school which is divided into a Lower School (Grades JK-4) and an Upper School (Grades 5–8). It is located on the block of The Church of St. Luke in the Fields in the West Village at 487 Hudson Street, Manhattan.

In 2020, the school completed an expansion, during which the school grew from a one-class-per-grade model to two classes per grade. Total enrollment for 2021-2022 is 340, which includes one class of Junior Kindergarten and two classes of Kindergarten through Grade 8. Class sizes range from 18 to 20. The student-teacher ratio is 7:1.

Bart Baldwin served as Head of School from 2007 to 2023. His successor, Tracy Fedonchik, was named in January 2023. The current Upper School Head is Amy Francisco, and the current Lower School Head is Karina Otoya-Knapp. The current Chief Officer of Admissions and Enrollment is Susan Harriot.

== History ==
Today's St. Luke's School is really the fourth school on its current grounds. Three times over the years, the Church of St. Luke in the Fields established parish day schools, but the constantly changing neighborhoods made it difficult to sustain them.

As World War II ended and young middle-class families moved into the West Village, St. Luke's responded to the community's need for a school. With the help of Trinity Church, St. Luke's School opened its doors on September 24, 1945, with 19 children and two teachers in classrooms in the Parish House. The school operated as a division of the church until it achieved independence in 2012. In 2020, St. Luke's School fully expanded its student body after a decade of growth. In fall 2022, the school opened its brand new rooftop play field and learning space.

Past heads of school have included Katharine Taylor, Barbara Belknap (sister of Robert L. Belknap), Katherine Johnson (interim), Jessie-Lea Hayes, and Ann Mellow. Robert Snyder was a teacher at the school between 1973 and 2011. Freyda Rapp was a physical education teacher from 1985 to 2012. An influential past librarian was Grace Sawyer, after whom the current library is named.

== Notable alumni ==
- Nicholas Birns, literary critic
- Caleb Carr—Author
- Emma Donoghue—author
- Kate Edwards, costume designer
- Lukasz Gottwald aka Dr. Luke—record producer and songwriter
- Madeleine Gruen, intelligence analyst
- Dorothy Huse Dowe—vice mayor of Greenville, SC
- Christopher Krovatin, novelist.
- Ledlie I. Laughlin III, Episcopal priest
- Victoria Leacock Hoffman—theatrical producer
- Maxime Pradié—Chef
- Henry Reukauf—Investment Analyst
- Kate Schellenbach, musician, Luscious Jackson

== Affiliations ==
National Association of Independent Schools (NAIS); New York State Association of Independent Schools (NYSAIS); Independent Schools Admissions Association of Greater New York (ISAAGNY); The Parents League	Early Steps; Prep for Prep; A Better Chance (ABC); the Downtown Independent Schools Consortium (DISC)
