= The Angel of Darkness =

1997 novel by Caleb Carr

- First edition cover
- Author: Caleb Carr
- Language: English
- Genre: Crime novel
- Publisher: Random House Inc
- Publication date: September 1997
- Publication place: United States
- Media type: Print (hardcover, paperback)
- Pages: 629 (hardcover)
- ISBN: 0-679-43532-8
- OCLC: 37107187
- Dewey Decimal: 813/.54 21
- LC Class: PS3553.A76277 A85 1997b
- Preceded by: The Alienist (1994)
- Followed by: Surrender, New York

The Angel of Darkness is a 1997 crime novel by Caleb Carr that was published by Random House (ISBN 0-7515-2275-9) and is both a sequel to The Alienist (1994) and the second book in the Kreizler series.

== Plot summary ==
The now-adult Stevie Taggert, a tobacconist, makes a bet with an elderly John Moore that he can write the story of one of their adventures together as well as Moore (a former newspaper reporter) could.

Set in 1897, Dr. Laszlo Kreizler's associate, Sara Howard, now a private detective, comes to him for help in locating Ana Linares, the kidnapped infant daughter of a visiting Spanish dignitary. The mystery is complicated by rising tensions between Spain and the United States, and war in Cuba seems inevitable. Kreizler re-convenes his old "team": Sara; John; NYPD detectives and forensic specialists Marcus and Lucius Isaacson; and Kreizler's faithful servants, Stevie and Cyrus. Their search for the missing child leads them to contact with an enigmatic woman with a murderous past, who enjoys the protection of the Hudson Dusters, a notorious gang.

== Historical figures in the novel ==
- Cecilia Beaux
- Clarence Darrow
- Theodore Roosevelt
- Albert Pinkham Ryder
- Elizabeth Cady Stanton
- Cornelius Vanderbilt II
- William Alanson White

== In other media ==
=== Television ===
In 2018, TNT released The Alienist, a ten-episode limited series first aired as a sneak peek on January 21, 2018, before its official premiere on January 22, 2018, and ended on March 26, 2018, based on the novel of the same name by Caleb Carr. The series stars Daniel Brühl, Luke Evans, and Dakota Fanning as an ad hoc team assembled in mid-1890s New York City to investigate a serial killer of street children.

On August 16, 2018, TNT ordered a sequel series based upon the follow-up novel The Angel of Darkness.

== See also ==
- 1997 in literature
- Lydia Sherman
