= Boodle Gang =

- Founded: c. 1850
- Founding location: Manhattan, New York
- Years active: 1850s–1890s
- Territory: Lower West Side
- Criminal activities: Hijacking, armed robbery, theft
- Rivals: Potashes, Hudson Dusters

The Boodle Gang was an American street gang active in New York City during the mid-to- late 19th century. The gang were notorious "butcher cart thieves" during the 1850s and their hijacking methods would later be used by criminals of the early twentieth century.

== History ==
One of the earliest hijackers in New York's history, the Boodle Gang began raiding food provision wagons which passed through their territory of New York's Lower West Side during the 1850s. After the wagons began traveling around the West Side, the gang began moving into Centre Market soon dominating the area as the leading butcher cart mob.

The gang's particular method, similar to other butcher mobs of the period, after approaching the store with a wagon about a dozen gang members would charge into a butcher shop stealing a whole carcass and fleeing in the wagon. The gang's theft usually met with indifference as rival competitors such as the Potashes were quick to take advantage by offering meat at discount prices.

By the 1860s, the Boodlers had perfected their techniques and had begun robbing messengers and couriers in the financial district. The gang's activities became very lucrative, particularly in January 1866 when two members robbed a courier carrying $14,000 and escaping by jumping onto a wagon losing their pursuers by clogging traffic in Beekman Street with three other carts. While the police were never able to halt their activities, the gang fared poorly during various gang wars during the 1890s, especially against the Hudson Dusters who would come to dominate the area by the end of the decade. The Boodle moniker failed to instill fear among rival gangs. By the turn of the century the Boodlers were defunct.
