= Killing Time (Carr novel) =

2000 novel by Caleb Carr

- First edition cover
- Author: Caleb Carr
- Publisher: Random House
- Publication date: November 9, 2000
- Pages: 336
- ISBN: 0-679-46332-1

Killing Time is a dystopian novel by Caleb Carr set in the mid-21st century. Its first 22 (of 47) chapters were initially serialized in five special issues of TIME and the complete work was later published in 2000 by Random House. It includes criticisms of the Information Age. The book was a departure for Carr, whose previous two novels (and his subsequent one) were crime thrillers set in the Victorian era.

== Characters ==
=== Main characters ===
- Dr. Gideon Wolfe: the criminal and psychiatrist.
- Dov Eshkol: the antagonist, a ruthless, fanatic agent of the Israeli Mossad

=== Other Team-Members ===
- Prof. Julien Fouché: the molecular biologist
- Dr. Eli Kuperman: the anthropologist
- Dr. Jonah Kuperman: the archaeologist
- Colonel Slayton: the (ex-US-)soldier
- Dr. Leon Tarbell: the documents expert
- Larissa Tressalian: Gideon's lover/ former assassin
- Malcom Tressalian: leader of the team/ Larissa's brother

=== Minor characters ===
- Chief Dugumbe: leader of the African tribe, with which Dr. Gideon Wolfe lives upon writing down his story
- Mutesa: member of the African tribe, who becomes Dr. Wolfe's host and sponsor
- General Said: Malaysian warlord and arms dealer

== Quotes ==
- "Mundus vult decipi" is a Latin phrase meaning "The world wants to be deceived"
- "It is the greatest truth of our age: Information is not knowledge."
- "I have but one lamp by which my feet are guided, and that is the lamp of experience. I know no way of judging the future but by the past." — Patrick Henry, 1775
