= J. Madison Wright Morris =

American actress (1984–2006)

J. Madison Wright
- Wright in Earth 2 (1994)
- Born: Jessica Madison Wright; July 29, 1984; Cincinnati, Ohio, U.S.
- Died: July 21, 2006 (aged 21); Lexington, Kentucky, U.S.
- Resting place: A. R. Dyche Memorial Park, London, Kentucky, U.S.
- Other name: J. Madison Wright
- Education: University of the Cumberlands
- Occupation: Actress
- Years active: 1994–1998
- Spouse: Brent Joseph Morris (m. 2006)

Jessica Madison Wright Morris (née Wright; July 29, 1984 – July 21, 2006), known professionally as J. Madison Wright, was an American child actor. A few years after she left acting, and while still a high school student, Wright underwent a heart transplant; in 2006, after graduating from college and two weeks after her wedding, she died from a heart attack.

== Early life ==
Morris was born July 29, 1984 in Cincinnati, Ohio, and was raised in the neighboring state of Kentucky, first in Lexington, and later in London.

== Career ==
She was cast in the role of 10-year-old True Danziger in the science fiction television series Earth 2. The show lasted only one season, airing between 1994 and 1995.

Wright moved onto other projects, including portraying a sick child in the ER episode "Hell and High Water" which won numerous nominations and awards, including for writing and directing.

Wright appeared in the family film Shiloh alongside her younger sister, Tori Wright. Her last roles, filmed when she was 13 years old and both released in early 1998, were the television movies The Warlord: Battle for the Galaxy and Safety Patrol.

== Later life, health problems and death ==
While attending South Laurel High School in London, Kentucky, Morris was diagnosed with restrictive cardiomyopathy, a disease of the heart muscle; in 2000, she received a heart transplant at the Cleveland Clinic in Cleveland, Ohio. She subsequently gave talks to various groups on the importance of organ donation.

After finishing at South Laurel High School, she attended the University of the Cumberlands in Williamsburg, Kentucky, where she studied English and earned her teaching credentials.

On July 8, 2006, she married Brent Joseph Morris, a University of Kentucky medical student. A day after they returned from their honeymoon in Hawaii, she suffered a heart attack and was admitted to the University of Kentucky Medical Center where she died on July 21, 2006, two weeks after her wedding and eight days shy of her 22nd birthday. She had been hired to start teaching English that September at George Rogers Clark High School in Winchester, Kentucky.

== Filmography ==
Film and television
Year	Title	Role	Notes
1994	Grace Under Fire	Caroline Baldwin	Episode: "Grace and Beauty"
1994	The Nanny	Betty Jo	Episode: "I Don't Remember Mama"
1994–1995	Earth 2	True Danziger	Main cast
1995	The Secretary	Shari Grayson	Television film
1995	ER	Molly Phillips	Episode: "Hell and High Water"
1996	Shiloh	Samantha "Sam" Wallace	Feature film
1997	The Burning Zone	Cathy Mason	Episode: "The Last Five Pounds Are the Hardest"
1998	The Warlord: Battle for the Galaxy	Nova Thorpe	Television film
1998	Safety Patrol	Jillie	Television film
