= Kreizler series =

Series of historical mystery novels by Caleb Carr

- The Alienist (1994); The Angel of Darkness (1997); Surrender, New York (2016); The Alienist at Armageddon (TBA); The Strange Case of Miss Sarah X (TBA)
- Author: Caleb Carr
- Country: United States
- Language: English
- Genre: Historical mystery; Detective
- Publisher: Random House
- Published: 1994–present
- Media type: Print (Hardcover)
- No. of books: 4

The Kreizler series is a series of historical mystery novels written by Caleb Carr, and published by Random House.

== Description ==
The series' main character is the psychologist Dr. Laszlo Kreizler, who is assisted in his adventures by reporter John Schuyler Moore, policewoman Sara Howard and Stevie 'Stevepipe' Taggart. He is a child psychologist who is an early criminal profiler who tracks down serial killers. He works with Police Commissioner Theodore Roosevelt and encounters many other real-life people in the novels.

The Alienist and its sequel The Angel of Darkness are set at the end of the 19th century. The next book in the series Surrender, New York is set in 2016, but the main protagonist, Dr. Trajan Jones, is also a criminal psychologist, and is the world's leading expert on the life and work of Dr. Laszlo Kreizler.

== Novels ==
=== Completed Novels ===
Title	Publisher	Date	ISBN
The Alienist	Random House	March 1994	0-679-41779-6
The Angel of Darkness	Random House	September 1997	0-679-43532-8
Surrender, New York	Random House	August 26, 2016	978-0-679-45569-1

=== Planned books ===
Title	Publisher	ISBN
The Alienist at Armageddon	Mulholland Books	978-0-316-50358-7
The Strange Case of Miss Sarah X	Hodder & Stoughton	978-1-4736-6104-2

On April 11, 2016, Entertainment Weekly announced that Caleb Carr would write two new books, a sequel and a prequel to The Alienist. The sequel was to be set 18 years after The Angel of Darkness, in 1915 New York City, and was to be “centered on nativist violence and terrorism during America’s involvement in World War I". The second book, a prequel, was to be called The Strange Case of Miss Sarah X, and would have seen a youthful Kreizler, after finishing his psychology training at Harvard, fall under the spell of William James, have his first run-in with Roosevelt, and delve into the secret life of Sara Howard. The Alienist at Armageddon was scheduled for publication by Little, Brown and Co. imprint Mulholland Books, but as of September 9, 2019 the book's webpage at Mulholland is unavailable.

== In other media ==
=== Television ===
In April 2015, Deadline reported that Paramount Television had decided to use a three-year, first-look production deal they made with Anonymous Content productions to adapt The Alienist as an event TV series. Paramount also announced that Oscar-winning Forrest Gump screenwriter Eric Roth had come on board the project as executive producer, as did Hossein Amini as both writer for the series and executive producer. It was also announced that the season 1 True Detective director Cary Fukunaga would be brought on board to direct all the episodes and act as an executive producer.

In May 2015, Variety reported that TNT had made a deal to produce the series at $5 million per episode. In July 2015, writer/director John Sayles announced on his blog that he was joining the team as writer for the TV series. On July 21, 2015, Caleb Carr made an announcement that he was coming on board the series as a consulting producer. The ten-episode series premiered on TNT on January 22, 2018.

On August 16, 2018, TNT ordered a sequel series based upon the follow-up novel The Angel of Darkness.
