= Potashes (gang) =

- Founded: c. 1890
- Founded by: Red Shay Meehan
- Founding location: Manhattan, New York
- Years active: 1890s
- Territory: Greenwich Village
- Ethnicity: Irish American
- Criminal activities: Assault, street fighting, knife fighting, armed robbery, river piracy
- Rivals: Boodle Gang, Hudson Dusters

The Potashes were a 19th-century Irish-American street gang active in Greenwich Village and the New York waterfront during the early to mid-1890s. One of the many to rise in New York City during the "Gay Nineties" period, the gang was led by Red Shay Meehan and based near the Babbit Soap Factory on Washington Street (hence their name) near present-day Rector Street.

The gang was described as "a collection of hard fighters, who terrorized the whole neighborhood and even dominated the other gangs". They and the much older Boodle Gang dominated Lower West Side Manhattan until the end of the 1890s when they were displaced by the then emerging Hudson Dusters who controlled the area for the next decade.
