= Marginals =

New York street gang

The Marginals, also called the "Paddy Irish" gang, was a New York street gang during the early 1900s which, under stevedore Thomas F. "Tanner" Smith, succeeded the longtime Hudson Dusters in their territory of New York's Lower West Side.

Based between Tenth and Ninth Avenues, the gang emerged around the turn of the century involved in extortion and labor slugging.

During police crackdowns on the city's street gangs during the early 1910s, eight members of the Tanner Smiths were apprehended along with members of the Gas House and Car Barn Gangs in September 1910. Five members would receive prison sentences with the other three fined $10.

On the night of June 18, 1914, Smith was arrested by police, who were investigating reports of four gunshots. Smith was witnessed pursuing a member of the Hudson Dusters with a revolver in his hand. Although the two arresting patrolman were confronted by members of the gang, they were able to take him into custody and he was charged with felonious assault.

After driving out the rival Hudson Dusters and the Pearl Buttons, the Marginals enjoyed a brief reign ruling over the Lower East Side until the death of Tanner, who was killed by George "Chicky" Lewis (although other newspaper accounts credit Rubber Shaw) at the Marginal Club on Eighth Avenue on July 26, 1919. His murder was one of several gangland slayings, as Rubber Shaw of the Hudson Dusters was gunned down in Hoboken on July 24 and Johnny Spanish was ambushed while entering a Second Avenue restaurant on July 29.
