= Mallet Murphy =

American saloon keeper and underworld figure in Hell's Kitchen

- Occupations: Saloon keeper and criminal associate of the Gopher Gang
- Known for: Saloon keeper and underworld figure in New York City during the late 19th and early 20th centuries; his saloon served as the original headquarters of the Gopher Gang.

Mallet Murphy (fl. 1890-1900) was the pseudonym of a popular American saloon keeper and underworld figure in Hell's Kitchen, New York during the late 1890s up until the start of the 20th century. His particular nickname was attributed to his use of a wooden mallet as a weapon against unruly customers and for defending his bar against criminals. His Battle Row saloon, located at Thirty-Ninth Street between Tenth and Eleventh Avenue, was used as the headquarters of the Gopher Gang during their early years.

Mallet Murphy has appeared in several historical novels including A Long Line of Dead Men (1999) by Lawrence Block, Cold Hit (2001) by Linda Fairstein and Michael Walsh's And All the Saints (2004).
