= Gopher Gang =

American street gang

- The Gopher Gang, Owney Madden back row, middle, leaning forward, circa 1910
- Founded: c. 1890
- Founded by: Marty Brennan; Stumpy Malarkey; Newburg Gallegher
- Founding location: Hell's Kitchen, New York City
- Years active: 1890s–1910s
- Territory: Manhattan
- Ethnicity: Irish-American
- Membership (est.): 500 (est.)
- Criminal activities: Burglary, armed robbery, street muggings, assault, prostitution and illegal gambling.
- Allies: Battle Row Ladies' Social and Athletic Club; Parlor Mob; Gorillas; Rhodes Gang
- Rivals: Hudson Dusters

The Gopher Gang was an early 20th-century New York street gang who counted among its members Goo Goo Knox, James "Biff" Ellison, and Owney Madden, born in England of Irish ancestry. Based in the Irish neighborhood of Hell's Kitchen, the Gopher Gang grew to control most of Manhattan with their territory covering Fourth to Forty-Second Street and Seventh to Eleventh Avenue.

== History ==
=== Origins and early years ===
The Gopher Gang formed from various local street gangs in the 1890s, numbering around 500 members, into what later became a committee including Marty Brennan, Stumpy Malarkey, and Newburg Gallegher. The committee met semi-regularly at their headquarters known as Battle Row, a saloon owned by Mallet Murphy, to discuss robberies and divide profits from Manhattan bordellos and illegal gambling operations.

=== Murder of William Lennon ===
Gallagher became involved in a three-year feud with local bartender William Lennon in 1907, their dispute being over a card game, which resulted in several violent altercations between them. The first incident between the two required Gallagher to have stitches after Lennon had repeatedly slashed his face with a knife. Gallagher later claimed that Lennon had threatened to shoot him on sight and engaged him in several gunfights including an incident in December 1909 when Lennon wounded him in a gunfight between the two.

On May 17, 1910, he and Marty Brennan entered a saloon where Lennon was working. After another argument between the two, Lennon drew a revolver and shot Gallagher in the stomach (two of these bullets were still lodged in his body at the time of his trial). Gallagher and Brennan entered another saloon at Eleventh Avenue and Forty-Fifth Street where, according to Gallagher, they unexpectedly encountered Lennon who was now working there. Upon spotting the two gang members, he swore at them and apparently went for his hip pocket when Gallagher pulled his pistol and fired three shots, killing him. He and Brennan left the saloon and were arrested shortly after.

Charged with manslaughter, Gallagher made a full confession, taking full responsibility for the killing, and claimed that Brennan had taken no part. The two were convicted and given long jail sentences. Gallagher, this being his first criminal offense, was sentenced to serve between 9 and 19 years imprisonment by Judge Foster on November 9, 1910. Despite his efforts, Brennan was also sentenced to 19 years due to a previous prison term in Elmira.

=== One Lung Curran and decline ===
In the early 1910s the Gophers were led by One Lung Curran who was notorious for his attacks on lone patrolmen. Although most police rarely patrolled Hell's Kitchen, and only then in large groups, Curran often stole officers' uniforms and, after taking them back to his girlfriend for alterations, would wear the stolen clothes around the neighborhood. This encouraged other gang members to steal uniforms for themselves, becoming a sort of trend among the prominent gang members.

The gang began employing younger apprentice gang members such as the Baby Gophers and other gangs subordinate to the Gophers. These included the Parlor Mob, the Gorillas, and the Rhodes Gang as well as a female gang known as the "Lady Gophers", led by Battle Annie. The Battle Row Ladies' Social and Athletic Club, as they were officially called, acted as reserve members of several hundred women for the Gophers in territorial disputes against rival gangs and as strikebreakers during the next decade. With the death of One Lung Curran in 1917, the gang declined in power, breaking up after most of the gang leaders were arrested by the end of the year.

== Popular culture ==
The 2002 film Gangs of New York directed by Martin Scorsese provided a fictionalized history of the Civil War-era origin of the competing Irish immigrant crime crews which dominated Five Points. The film explains the social tradition of enduring, if not actually shielding, Irish gangs in Manhattan's Irish-American neighborhoods.

The gang features prominently in Clive Cussler's 2010 novel The Spy.
