= The Alienist =

1994 novel by Caleb Carr

- First edition cover
- Author: Caleb Carr
- Language: English
- Publisher: Random House
- Publication date: 1994
- Publication place: United States
- Media type: Print (hardcover)
- Pages: 496
- ISBN: 0-679-41779-6
- OCLC: 28798086
- Dewey Decimal: 813/.54 20
- LC Class: PS3553.A76277 A44 1994
- Followed by: The Angel of Darkness

The Alienist is a crime novel by Caleb Carr first published in 1994 and is the first book in the Kreizler series. It takes place in New York City in 1896, and includes appearances by many famous figures of New York society in that era, including Theodore Roosevelt and J. P. Morgan. The story follows Roosevelt, then New York City police commissioner, and Dr. Laszlo Kreizler, as their investigative team attempts to solve gruesome murders through new methods including fingerprinting and psychology. The first murder victim investigated is a 13-year-old immigrant who has had his eyes removed, his genitals removed and stuffed in his mouth, and other injuries. The investigators deal with various interest groups that wish to maintain the status quo regarding the poor immigrant population in New York City. The sequel to the novel is The Angel of Darkness.

The book made best-sellers lists of Publishers Weekly and The New York Times the month it was published, and film rights to the story were purchased by producer Scott Rudin and Paramount Pictures. The film studio has since moved the rights over to its television division, where a 10-part event TV series adaptation began its run on January 22, 2018, on TNT. The Alienist received generally positive reception. Booklist described it as "superbly atmospheric and compelling", Forbes called the work a "fascinating, fast-paced spine-tingler", and author Paul Levine wrote in the Chicago Tribune "at the end the reader thirsts for another tale of Dr. Laszlo Kreizler". The Houston Chronicle characterized it "an out-and-out page-turner", and The Seattle Times noted "Carr brings the dual sensibilities of historian and novelist to the story."

== Plot summary ==
Narrated from the first-person perspective of John Moore, a crime reporter for The New York Times, the novel begins on January 8, 1919, the day that Theodore Roosevelt is buried. Moore has dinner with Laszlo Kreizler, the famous alienist. Kreizler is surrounded by those he has rescued, including his black servant, Cyrus Montrose, and a boy named Stevie "Stevepipe" Taggert. (Mary Palmer, another patient and Kreizler's housekeeper, is deceased by the time of this dinner.) Together, they reminisce about their times with Roosevelt, but they focus on one moment: the spring of 1896 and their efforts to catch a serial killer on the Lower East Side of Manhattan. The novel is narrated in retrospect, with Moore commenting on the events and how they impacted later history.

At 2 AM on March 3, 1896, Moore is awakened by one of Kreizler's servants banging incessantly on his door. Stevie, a young boy whom Kreizler had saved from being institutionalized and who is dedicated to Kreizler, brings Moore to the scene of a crime that Kreizler wants Moore to see. Roosevelt, the police commissioner, is already at the scene. When Moore sees the nature of the brutal murder, he is appalled. The victim, Georgio "Gloria" Santorelli, is a 13-year-old boy who prostituted himself by dressing up as a girl; the boy's wrists are tied behind his back, and he is kneeling with his face pressed on the steel walkway where he was found. Though makeup paint and powder on his face are still intact, his eyes are gouged out, his right hand is chopped off, his genitals are cut off and stuffed between his jaws, he has huge gashes across his entire body, his throat has been slashed, and his buttocks are "shorn off". The policeman at the scene, Detective Sergeant Connor, makes it clear that murders of such victims are usually ignored.

"Prior to the twentieth century, persons suffering from mental illness were thought to be 'alienated,' not only from the rest of society but from their own true natures. Those experts who studied mental pathologies were known as 'alienists'."

— "Note" at the beginning of the novel

At Roosevelt's request, Moore, Kreizler, and he meet the following morning in Roosevelt's office to discuss the case. Kreizler has examined the body and disagrees with the official coroner's report. He connects the Santorelli killing to that of a second case in which two children, Benjamin and Sofia Zweig, were killed and had their eyes gouged out. Roosevelt announces that there are two more murders that match the pattern. Roosevelt decides to investigate, but because Kreizler has such a dubious reputation as an alienist, and because the investigation will become politically difficult, he establishes a base of operations for them outside the police precinct. Politically, Roosevelt cannot afford to be associated with the investigation and is not involved with the day-to-day operations.

Kreizler asks for some young detectives who are open to new methods and receives the help of Marcus and Lucius Isaacson, two Jewish brothers who were hired when Roosevelt began removing corrupt police officers from the force. The Isaacsons bring sophisticated methods, such as the Bertillon system and fingerprinting, to the investigation, although these were not popular in New York City police departments at the time nor accepted in courts of law.

The group begins to investigate the victims, hoping to understand the mind of the murderer by understanding his victims. They interview Georgio Santorelli's mother and discover, for example, that there was discord in his family. Georgio's parents had learned of his being manipulated into performing sexual acts for older boys in school, and the father's response was to try to beat it out of the boy. Georgio eventually left home and lived on the streets as a male-for-male prostitute. They also read the emerging science of psychology, such as the works of William James. Another body is discovered, and the evidence suggests that the victim knew his attacker. The team also deduces that the killer's agility on rooftops suggests that he is familiar with mountain- or rock-climbing.

Kreizler, Roosevelt, Moore, and detective Sara Howard must deal with various interest groups during their investigation who wish to maintain society's status quo, including a corrupt police force, which takes bribes from owners of the brothels whose prostitutes include poor immigrants; the Catholic Church, which is wary of the potential power of an organized immigrant population; the Episcopal Church; and J. P. Morgan.

== Characters ==
John Moore
a New York Times reporter and the narrator of the novel;
Dr. Laszlo Kreizler
the titular alienist of the novel;
Stevie Taggert
Kreizler's teenage groom and carriage driver;
Cyrus Montrose
Kreizler's valet and bodyguard;
Mary Palmer
Kreizler's housemaid;
Marcus and Lucius Isaacson
brothers and Detective Sergeants with the NYPD
Sara Howard
police secretary, friends with John Moore

=== Historical figures ===
- Thomas F. Byrnes
- Anthony Comstock
- Michael Corrigan
- James "Biff" Ellison
- H. H. Holmes (mentioned only)
- William James
- Paul Kelly
- Jack McManus
- Adolf Meyer
- J. P. Morgan
- Jesse Pomeroy
- Henry C. Potter
- Jacob Riis
- Theodore Roosevelt
- Lincoln Steffens
- Franz Boas

== Composition and biographical background ==
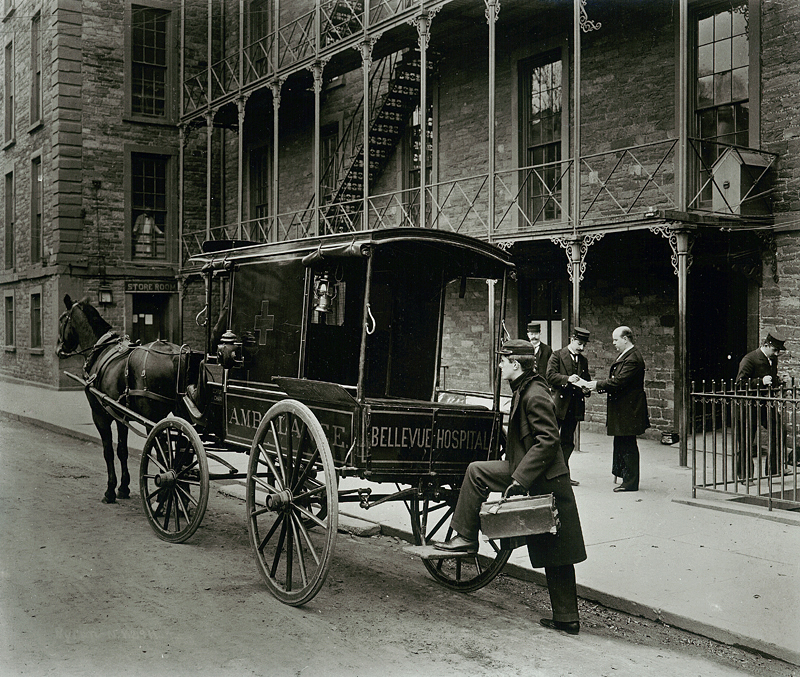
Ambulance standing outside Bellevue, a psychiatric hospital, in New York City in 1895

The Alienist is set in the neighborhood where Carr lived, and he has spent hours wandering around it. He also spent a lot of time researching his book at the J. P. Morgan Library. Carr pitched the book as non-fiction, because he was afraid his agent and editor would not accept a fiction book from a non-fiction author. Only when the publisher was on the verge of buying the book did he reveal the truth. The novel "allowed him to exorcise some of his demons, mostly centered on his relationship with his father, which was stormy and sometimes violent." Carr did not reveal specific details of his family history, but said, "It's safe to assume that I know something about family violence...." and he told New York magazine, "I'm the only kid in my family who never tried to kill himself...I kind of figured somebody else was going to kill me anyway."

Carr's natural father, Lucien Carr, was a writer, who in the 1940s was at the center of a group of as-yet unknown writers (Jack Kerouac, Allen Ginsberg, and William Burroughs). In the summer of 1944, he killed his former scoutmaster, a man who was enamored with him. One night, the scoutmaster supposedly made a move on Lucien Carr, and Carr stabbed him in the chest with his boy scout knife. Carr disposed of the body in the Hudson River, and together he and Kerouac got rid of the knife. Carr was sentenced to two years' jail time and Kerouac a few days.

Caleb Carr was "fascinated with the psychology of killers, who were subliminally acting out the pain of being controlled by monstrous parents by controlling and killing victims, seeking a release that would never come." As he explains, "For me it began in New York with the Son of Sam killings while I was in college...I think I can understand some of the kind of rage that's behind what they do. I can't understand the major portion of it because that's what leads to the violence they commit. But I can understand the germ of it."

== Genre and style ==
The Alienist has been called a detective novel, an historical novel, and a mystery novel. It is set in 1896, "the moment in history when the modern idea of the serial killer became available", eight years after the Jack the Ripper case, and at a time when the word "psychopath" was new to scientists. Like E. L. Doctorow's Ragtime, the novel combines fact with fiction. Historical figures such as Lincoln Steffens, Jacob Riis, Anthony Comstock, and J. Pierpont Morgan appear briefly in the novel and interact with the fictional characters. Carr includes period details, such as descriptions of "sumptuous meals of turtle soup au clair, Creole eggs, broiled squab, saddle of lamb a la Colbert and 'a liter of smooth, dark Wurzburger (beer) that had a head as thick as whipped cream'".

== Themes ==
"The biggest challenge was to study the psychological literature of that day, so that none of my characters would know any more than they *could* have known about psychology."

— Caleb Carr

In an interview with The Record, Carr stated he wanted to entertain the reader, while also staying faithful to the time period. Carr, a historian by training, wanted to find a form of writing where he could meld his interest in fiction with his knowledge of history. "The one thing I wanted to show was that people back then are a lot more like people today than we realize," said Carr. Carr researched the science and literature of the time period and noted, "The biggest challenge was to study the psychological literature of that day so that none of my characters would not know more than they could have known in terms of psychology. We're talking about a time when Sigmund Freud had just published his first book."

Author Paul Levine compares Kreizler to Sherlock Holmes and Sigmund Freud. He likens The Alienist to Ragtime by E.L. Doctorow; both stories fuse historical fiction with real characters from the time period. Levine notes the story serves as a "painless history lesson", and comments that the juxtaposition of J.P. Morgan's lifestyle with " the teeming tenements where police dare not enter", serve as "reminders that crime and class distinction are hardly new".

Carr said that "The Alienist is about how violent behavior is perpetuated from one generation to the next."

The Alienist "explores the causes of insanity and criminality, and ultimately the nature of evil".

Another theme is destiny, and the novel investigates New York City's destiny, "saying its basic character and problems have endured over history".

== Reception ==
=== Sales and marketing ===
Random House paid Carr an advance of $60,000 for the book. Paperback rights were sold at auction to Bantam for $1,001,000. The book made Publishers Weekly's list of best-sellers in April 1994, and during the summer of 1994 reached between no. 4 and no. 7 on The New York Times Best Seller list.

=== Reviews ===
"The story feels like a Sherlock Holmes tale, reads like a modern thriller, and is historically accurate."

— The Record

The book has received generally favorable reviews; "while most critics found it entertaining, some said it was sometimes flabby with historical detail and its prose was less than literature." In a review published in Booklist, Brad Hooper calls The Alienist and Caleb Carr's sequel, The Angel of Darkness, "superbly atmospheric and compelling". A review of The Alienist in Forbes comments: "Wonderfully evocative of the age, this fascinating, fast-paced spine-tingler never flags." Writing for The Record, Laurence Chollet notes: "The story feels like a Sherlock Holmes tale, reads like a modern thriller, and is historically accurate." In his review in The Gazette of Colorado Springs, Victor Greto wrote: "Through his research into the New York of the late 19th century, [Carr] has also fleshed out an atmosphere and a time that, on the one hand, seems grimly real and unapproachably evil, but, on the other, is within our intellectual grasp." In her review for Tulsa World, Patricia Ann Jones wrote that the novel "breaks new ground on several fronts. As a historical novel it paints an unrivaled picture of New York. As a thriller it sets a new pace. But as a psychological study it stands completely on its own. The writing is quite simply, superb."

In his review of the book for the Chicago Tribune, Mortal Sin author Paul Levine writes: "the long story never becomes tedious, and at the end the reader thirsts for another tale of Dr. Lazlo Kreizler". Kathye Self of the Houston Chronicle characterizes the work as "an out-and-out page-turner about the first time a 'psychological profile' was used to track down a serial murderer". Christopher Lehmann-Haupt writes in The Tampa Tribune: "Carr has lovingly evoked not only a physical sense of old New York but the spirit of the time as well, when the powers in charge were worried about unrest among the masses of cheap immigrant labor." In a review for The Seattle Times, Deloris Tarzan Ament comments: "A contributing editor to Military History Quarterly, Carr brings the dual sensibilities of historian and novelist to the story." In his review for The Washington Post, novelist Jack Katzenbach argued that Carr's impeccable research and rich detail hindered the work's pace but rewarded readers by portraying "the excitement of a world on the verge of change, where invention was the stuff of daily miracle," specifically when it came to forensics.

According to The New York Times, "the only real weakness of the book lies in the stringent rationality of Kreizler's investigation. The more his logic makes sense the less threatening his quarry seems, at least to the reader....The story's fatalism grows tedious....Nor does it help that throughout most of the story none of the major characters are directly threatened by the killer. Of course, it is deplorable that children are being murdered. But none of them figure strongly enough in the story to arouse the reader's visceral identification." Scott Eyman of The Palm Beach Post was critical of the "flaccid dialogue" and "vague characters". Hary Levins from the St. Louis Post-Dispatch noted that the novel does include a few notable anachronisms. For example, the "heroes display an early (and highly improbable) political correctness toward blacks and homosexuals. And his detective team anticipates the feminist movement by enlisting a tough-minded career woman who's unafraid to pack a pistol and spout a bit of scatological English."

== Adaptations ==
=== Film ===
Carr told the Orange County Register he had envisioned a film adaptation of his work while writing the story. "I was always aware that if done correctly, this could end up being a great movie. I grew up with the movies. I've written scripts. Movies are something I've always loved," he said. Carr thought of Emma Thompson to play Sara, and Anthony Hopkins or Sam Neill to play Kreizler.

Before the book was published, film producer Scott Rudin purchased the film rights to the novel for $500,000. In June 1993, Paramount Pictures bought the film rights to the novel for $750,000.

In January 1995, The River Wild director Curtis Hanson was reported to have been in the process of final negotiations with Scott Rudin and Paramount Pictures to direct The Alienist. By May 1995, Hanson was signed on as the film's director. Variety reported that the film's producers planned for filming to start in Spring 1995, with an intended Christmas release date in mind. Tony Award-winning playwright David Henry Hwang adapted the book for film. Scouts for the film visited Philadelphia in May 1995 to consider location shooting in the city. Film scouts for The Alienist were particularly interested in Philadelphia's Academy of Music, Eastern State Penitentiary, and Waterworks.

Paramount Pictures was concerned with the film's budget, which reportedly was almost $50 million. By 1997, multiple script drafts from three writers brought costs to approximately $2 million. After delays in production, Paramount Pictures told the group behind the film they had two months to set the project up at another studio. In a review of Carr's sequel The Angel of Darkness, Malcolm L. Johnson of The Hartford Courant cited concerns over how to depict the mutilation of the murdered prostitutes in the film, writing: "Questions about how to treat this gruesome element has perhaps delayed the film of The Alienist." When in a 1999 online chat with fans, set up by Time and Yahoo!, Carr was asked if there were film plans for The Alienist or The Angel of Darkness, he responded: "Only 'The Alienist,' and the attempts have been so bad that I have not yet sold 'Angel' to the movies. What happened was that a producer bought the rights and then decided he had to completely change the characters in the book. We got into a huge conflict, one that is actually ongoing."

=== TV series ===
In April 2015, Deadline Hollywood reported that Paramount Television had decided to use a three-year, first-look production deal they made with Anonymous Content productions to adapt The Alienist as an event TV series. Jakob Verbruggen was chosen to serve as director after Cary Fukunaga withdrew from the project.

== See also ==
- Albert Fish
- Charlie Chop-off
- Prostitution in 19th Century United States
