= Caleb Carr =

American military historian and author (1955–2024)

- Born: August 2, 1955; Manhattan, New York, U.S.
- Died: May 23, 2024 (aged 68); Cherry Plain, New York, U.S.
- Education: St. Luke's School; Friends Seminary; Kenyon College; New York University (BA)
- Occupations: Historian; author
- Relatives: Lucien Carr (father)
- Writing career
- Genres: Historical thrillers; military and diplomatic history; terrorism
- Notable works: The Alienist; The Angel of Darkness; Casing the Promised Land; Killing Time; The Italian Secretary
- Notable awards: The Anthony Award for The Alienist

Caleb Carr (August 2, 1955 – May 23, 2024) was an American military historian and author. Carr was the second of three sons born to Lucien Carr and Francesca Von Hartz.

Carr authored The Alienist, The Angel of Darkness, Casing the Promised Land, The Lessons of Terror, Killing Time, The Devil Soldier, The Italian Secretary, and The Legend of Broken, as well as 'My Beloved Monster', a memoir about his relationship with Masha, his half-wild Siberian Forest Cat. He previously taught military history at Bard College, and worked extensively in film, television, and the theater. His military and political writings appeared in numerous magazines and periodicals, among them The Washington Post, The New York Times, and The Wall Street Journal. He lived in upstate New York.

== Early years and education ==
Carr was born on August 2, 1955, in Manhattan, one of three sons born to Beat Generation figure Lucien Carr and Francesca von Hartz. Lucien's close circle of friends included William Burroughs, Jack Kerouac, and Allen Ginsberg, whom Lucien had known since his college days. Their frequent presence in the Carr household affected Carr's future career: "They were noisy drunks that were a disruption. They made me determined never to be a fiction writer". This reaffirmed an earlier sentiment in a 1997 interview, where he stated that, as a child, "If you had told me I would be an artist or novelist when I grew up, I would have laughed in your face".

Carr received his primary education from St. Luke's School in Greenwich Village and his secondary education from Friends Seminary, also in downtown New York City. Carr's interest in military history did not help him fit in at Friends Seminary, a Quaker school. He was an excellent student, but he was guilty of pranks like setting off cherry bombs in the school lavatories. When he discovered that his school transcript was marked "Socially Undesirable", he was "stunned". "We had guys in our school who dealt opium and cocaine out of their lockers, and the teacher would take them aside and have conversations". The designation was enough to keep him out of Harvard. He attended Kenyon College, in Gambier, Ohio, from 1973 to 1975 and returned to New York City in 1975 to complete his education at New York University, where, in 1977, he was awarded a Bachelor of Arts in military and diplomatic history.

Much of Carr's fiction deals with violence perpetrated by people whose behavior has its origins in childhood abuse. His father, whose famously turbulent childhood ended in a conviction for manslaughter, inflicted physical and emotional abuse upon his wife and children. Caleb remembered being singled out for his father's beatings: "He was enormously threatened by me, from the time I was a child—threatened by my tendency to speak what I perceived. Alcoholics don't tend to like children like that." The physical and verbal abuse fueled by alcohol and rage didn't stop even after Caleb's parents divorced when he was eight. Carr did not learn about his father's crime until he was 18. He recalls being shocked, "but not exactly surprised".

The frequent presence of Kerouac, Ginsberg, and Burroughs in the Carr home was a "little unnerving". "They could be perfectly nice people one-to-one", Carr told Salon in a 1997 interview. "Kerouac was a very nice man. Allen could be a very nice guy. Burroughs was a little strange for a child. But they weren't children people. You needed to be grown up to be around them if you wanted to not be terrified. What they were up to was not gonna make any child reassured."

After the Carrs' divorce, Kerouac proposed marriage to Caleb's mother, but she turned him down and afterwards married writer John Speicher. Carr's new stepfather was another heavy drinker, and Carr made weekly visits to Lucien. "There was a lot of craziness in the family," Carr remembered, "and a lot of alcoholism among the adults." Speicher had three daughters from a previous marriage, and they and the three Carr brothers bonded, a group that Caleb would label "the dark Brady Bunch". They spent most summers at a house in upstate New York, originally bought by Carr's maternal grandparents, then owned by his mother. "When the adults weren't around it was a place of great solace. When they were, it was a place of great exploration because being in the house too much wasn't an option."

Likewise, when the family was back in New York City, Caleb spent as much time as possible away from their apartment. Among his favorite havens, other than the streets of Manhattan themselves, were the city's movie theaters. He at first preferred classic and then war movies, and became increasingly interested in military history. "Part of it was a desire to find violence that was, in the first place, directed toward some sort of purposeful end, and second, governed by a definable ethical code. And I think it's fairly obvious why I would want to do that", he told New York magazine in 1994.

== Career ==
=== Early career ===
Carr first went to work for the Council on Foreign Relations after high school as a library assistant, and rose during his college year summers (and a semester off) to research assistant. He also wrote freelance articles on global issues. During this period, he published his first nationally noticed broadside: a long indictment, published on the letters page of The New York Times, of Henry Kissinger's foreign policy. This assisted noted historian and expert on U.S. foreign policy James Chace in helping Carr, after he left New York University, to get a job as a researcher and editorial assistant for the Foreign Affairs Quarterly, where Chace was managing editor.

In 1980, Carr left Foreign Affairs to fine-tune and publish his first novel, Casing the Promised Land, a coming of age story about three young men in New York City. It was dedicated to "Everyone who fed me and to: James Chace". Nearly 20 years after Casing the Promised Land was published, the extreme prices that book dealers were offering for the volume forced Carr to post this "self-criticism" on the book's Amazon.com page: "I am the author of this book. It has a few good scenes, but is essentially 'roman à clef' nonsense that every writer has to get out of his system early on. Do yourself a favor and read anything else I've written (you'll be doing me a favor, too). Forgive the follies of youth" (emphasis in the original).

James Chace brought Carr on to organize and edit his acclaimed book, Endless War, dealing with the crisis in Central America, which Carr then covered as a freelance journalist for the Berkshire Eagle and The New York Times. In 1988 Carr and Chace co-authored America Invulnerable: The Quest for Absolute Security from 1812 to Star Wars, an unprecedented and highly acclaimed study of United States of America's traditional and unequivocal approach to national security, beginning with the nation's founders. From the book: "For more than two centuries, the United States has aspired to a condition of perfect safety from foreign threats. Alarmed by even potential dangers to the nation's security, Americans have forcefully responded to both real and imagined assaults against our own borders as well as against those of foreign nations and provinces whose security we have seen as either strategically or politically linked to our own ... Yet the goal of absolute security has constantly eluded us."

In 1989 he became a contributing editor to MHQ: The Quarterly Journal of Military History, a position he still held in 1994.

In 1991 Carr published The Devil Soldier: The Story of Frederick Townsend Ward, the American Soldier of Fortune Who Became a God in China, a biography, and the first of his books to receive wide recognition. According to The New York Times, "by marshaling his scholarship well and setting it out as an adventure story, Mr. Carr gives a good picture of the buccaneering milieu of the time, and makes a plausible case for the devil soldier being on the side of the angels."

Carr was also active in Hollywood in the 1980s and '90s as a screenwriter and producer. He wrote one movie for television, Bad Attitudes (1991), but the revision and execution of his script deeply disappointed him.

=== 1990s ===
Carr returned to New York to begin researching and writing what would prove his breakthrough novel, The Alienist, published in 1994. The book became an international bestseller and has been translated into more than 24 languages. Winner of the 1995 Anthony Award for best first novel (although technically it was his second), the book, set in 1896 New York City follows the exploits of a small band of individuals determined to catch a serial killer. The book was also nominated for the 1995 Bram Stoker award.

Carr's lifelong interest in violence, which initially fed his study of military history, expanded into a study of serial killers with the advent of the Son of Sam murders of 1976–1977. (Once again, this was not a mere fascination with brutality, but with the underlying causes of violence and with people—especially military leaders—who seek to limit killing.) Later, as The Alienist began taking shape in his imagination, Carr immersed himself in the history of the New York City neighborhoods in which he had grown up and biographies of its notable figures of the Nineteenth century. He also sought the counsel, during a series of meetings, with Dr. David Abrahamsen, the psychiatrist who examined David Berkowitz after his capture and "unraveled the mind" of the Son of Sam killer. Carr sold the movie rights for The Alienist to Paramount based on an early draft of the book.

Returning to Hollywood, Carr wrote the pilot for a dystopian vision of the far future, The Osiris Chronicles, for Paramount Television. After a vigorous auction, sale of the broadcast rights went to CBS. Once again, however, the execution of the production was deeply disappointing to Carr, and the show was not picked up. Consulted by Paramount TV as to what could be done to salvage the pilot, Carr told Paramount that, if left to work on his own with the assistant editor, he could produce a new cut of the show for a television movie that would at least be moderately successful, especially abroad. Paramount agreed, and the movie, titled The Warlord: Battle for the Galaxy (1998), did indeed prove a modest success, particularly in foreign markets.

At the same time, he appeared on the History Channel's Jack the Ripper: Phantom of Death (1995) as an expert commentator; additionally he was a guest commentator on PBS's American Experience: New York Underground. He was also a featured commentator in Ric Burns' 1999 documentary New York: A Documentary History. Back in Los Angeles, he performed a page-one rewrite of William Wisher Jr.'s script for a prequel to The Exorcist for Morgan Creek Productions, resulting in a screenplay that attracted the legendary John Frankenheimer to direct, Liam Neeson to star, and the famed cinematographer Vittorio Storaro to shoot. But when Frankenheimer suddenly died and was replaced by Paul Schrader, who insisted on his own version of the script, Neeson abandoned the project and Carr, deeply disillusioned, returned to New York for the last time. He was given partial story credit for the two films eventually produced from the script, Exorcist: The Beginning and Dominion: Prequel to the Exorcist, although, in a subsequent interview with the LA Weekly, Carr emphasized that the movies bore little to no relation to his story.

For his next novel, Carr brought back the principals from The Alienist to solve another serial murder case in The Angel of Darkness, published in 1997. The sequel not only sold more copies than its predecessor, it received more critical acclaim. This time, the killer at the center of the hunt is a female murdering infants. The narrator for this adventure is Stevie Taggart, the street urchin Dr. Laszlo Kreizler saved from jail years earlier. When asked about the subject matter, Carr stated, "You want to believe that there's one relationship in life that's beyond betrayal—a relationship that's beyond that kind of hurt—and there isn't. The simple fact is, if the mothers that we see in the press are doing this kind of stuff, then the numbers who are actually doing it are probably much higher."

In 1996 he wrote a piece in the World Policy Journal titled "Terrorism as Warfare: the Lessons of Military History". He also published widely recognized essays on the Somalia intervention ("The Consequences of Somalia") on the corruption and what he saw as the immorality of the CIA ("Aldrich Ames and the Conduct of American Intelligence"), and the pointlessness of trying to pursue purely "humanitarian" military interventions, which the Clinton administration was trying to establish as a doctrine ("The Humanitarian Illusion"), along with numerous other security and military policy pieces. In recognition of these efforts, Random House appointed Carr editor for the Modern Library War series. Carr was also a member of their Modern Library Board. As such, in 1998 and 1999, he participated in the "100 best" project, voting on the 100 best novels and 100 best non-fiction works of the 20th century.

=== Later career ===
In 2000, Carr published his next novel, Killing Time, another dystopian tale of the future, this time the near future: 2023. First serialized in Time magazine in 1999. The book finds a world with an abundance of information too easily manipulated, thus frequently obscuring reality. The characters travel from New York to the jungles of Africa in their quest to use such manipulation for the benefit of mankind, only to find themselves enmeshed in the central tragic paradox of their efforts, summed up best in a line from the book that is now a commonplace: "Information is not knowledge". Although some agreed with USA Today that Killing Time was "a techno-terrifying tale of the information age run amok" and "a daring departure from the successful Alienist formula, but Carr is still a master of the cliffhanger, serving up a non-stop thrill ride as the story builds to a surprising finish", many found its stark view of information manipulation and its consequences too pessimistic, and the book was only briefly a New York Times bestseller.

Following the attacks of September 11, 2001, which were along the lines that Carr had warned of in his writings on terrorism, he returned to the subject, using his "Terrorism as Warfare" piece as the basis for his best-selling, highly acclaimed but controversial book, The Lessons of Terror: A History of Warfare Against Civilians. Published in 2002, this study of the history of terrorism from ancient Rome to the present was among the first to provide a precise definition of terrorism, one that has endured and made the book a landmark book in the field: Once again, reviews were extreme but mixed: some did not share the opinion of the Christian Science Monitor, which foretold correctly that, "After the deadly attacks against the United States, many Americans may now find Carr's earlier arguments prescient and his approach the only one that has a chance of working;" instead, many critics agreed with Newsweek's opinion that, "The Lessons of Terror is so earnest, so well informed and so outrageous ... that almost any reader will find something to love and something that will make you want to throw the book across the room. It is, in short, pure Carr." But the work achieved the influence among military historians, one of the most eminent of whom, John Lynn, subsequently declared, in his own ensuing volume, Battle: a History of Combat and Culture, that Carr's "insistence that Terrorism [sic] can be traced back to the ancient world and that great armies and great states have engaged in attacks on civilians designed to intimidate and terrorize them is important in both obvious and subtle ways", as well as among terrorism experts, and the military and defense communities that Carr had sought; and it formed the basis of his deeper involvement in an advisory capacity for members of the government. Shortly after its publication, he testified before the House Subcommittee on National Security, met privately with Defense Secretary Donald Rumsfeld to discuss the future of the war on terrorism, and served as a guest speaker on every major network and many cable news outlets during the American invasions of Afghanistan and Iraq. Carr was scheduled to appear on February 6, 2002, at the Council on Foreign Relations to discuss his book, The Lessons of Terror. On February 4, 2002, the appearance was cancelled. Various reasons for the halting of the engagement were put forth in the media. One council member was told there was a scheduling conflict; others alleged not enough members signed up; yet Carr believed the real reason was due to his criticisms of Henry Kissinger, who was a member of the council.

Bard College had asked Carr, in 2003, to speak on the topic of Imperial America. He furthered his relationship with Bard as a visiting professor of history from 2004 to 2005 teaching courses ranging from World Military History to the History of American Intelligence to the History of Insurgencies and Counter Insurgencies. He also taught a course in Criminal Profiling at John Jay College in Manhattan. In 2007, he again participated in the Bard Globalization and International Affairs Program's Speakers Series speaking on the topic of anticipating counter insurgency in Iraq. On September 10, 2002, Carr participated in the Bard's Globalization and International Affairs Program panel discussions to mark the events of September 11, 2001, discussing the repercussions of the attacks on the World Trade Center, Shanksville, Pennsylvania, and the Pentagon. In 2013, Bard hosted a six-week academic exchange program on foreign policy with the U.S. State Department, titled, "Grand Strategy in Context: Institutions, People, and the Making of U.S. Foreign Policy".

In 2005 Carr published The Italian Secretary, subtitled A Further Adventure of Sherlock Holmes. The project was initially to be part of an anthology of new Sherlock Holmes stories by modern mystery writers. When asked why he took on this project, Carr responded, "I think my interest in Holmes is probably like a lot of authors'. There are authors for whom the Holmes stories are part of the beginning of their decision to become writers, especially writers who aspire to popular fiction that has a bit more to it."

Carr's next fiction endeavor, an ambitious volume he had been tinkering with since the 1980s, was published under the title The Legend of Broken in 2012. This work of speculative history set during a time period we know little about—the Dark Ages—imagines a multilayered tale where cultures collide in their bid to rule a kingdom where the borders of the natural world seem to almost bleed over into the unnatural, at times, although Carr was adamant in his declaration that the book was not a work of fantasy. The fictional kingdom of Broken occupies the part of modern Germany known as the Harz Mountains, in particular the mountain peak known as Brocken, which for centuries had been considered the seat of supernatural doings, because, Carr demonstrates, of the ignorance and superstition of man. As the book progresses we see how the word "broken" pertains, not only to the city, but also to the characters. The book is an allegory, a cautionary tale for our own time that The Washington Post declared, "an excellent and old-fashioned entertainment ... The Legend of Broken seamlessly blends epic adventure with serious research and asks questions that men and women grappled with in the Dark Ages and still do today."

Carr spent several years researching and writing his final novel, Surrender, New York, published August 23, 2016, by Penguin Random House. He stated, "This book is essentially a modern application of the principles and theories of Dr. Laszlo Kreizler to criminal behavior especially that directed at children."

After many failed attempts at adapting The Alienist to film, Paramount announced, in the summer of 2015, that it had partnered with TNT to produce a TV series adaptation helmed by Cary Fukunaga, Emmy-winning director of True Detective. Carr, tentatively hired on (pending his approval of the final scripts produced) as a consulting producer, commented, "After twenty years of tough struggle and countless failed attempts, I'm delighted that Paramount Television, Anonymous Content and TNT have decided to join forces and bring 'The Alienist' to life in what, based on the material I've read, has the potential to be a faithful and exciting TV series." Hossein Amini, Gina Gionfriddo, E. Max Frye and John Sayles also joined the Paramount Television and Anonymous Content project as writers.

Carr consistently kept up his nonfiction writing, on terrorism, especially. In response to the continued threats from ISIS near the end of 2015 and early in 2016, for example, Carr published a quartet of essays embodying once again his roots as a noted military scholar. The first article, published in the Los Angeles Times, was "If France Wants to Succeed against Islamic State, it should Study the U. S. Invasion of Afghanistan". That was followed by "Let Europe Lead the War in Syria: History Counsels Caution for American Troops", published in the New York Daily News. Next, Vanity Fair published, "The Frantic Media Response to San Bernardino is Making Us Less Safe;" and most recently, the Daily News published another essay of Carr's called, "Strangling Isis, Slowly but Surely" The last warned what Carr saw as an American public that has never fully recovered psychologically from the attacks of 9/11 and that the Global War on Terrorism will never have "a Hiroshima moment", and should not attempt one; instead, victory will only be gained patiently and over a span of decades.

=== Other work ===
While Carr's early years at home were fraught with chaos and abuse, author James Chace, a childhood friend, stated the house was also "full of learning ... The thing is, most people tend to be narrow. But all the Carrs know music incredibly well, history, literature—they're extraordinarily remarkable." In the 1980s Carr pursued his career as a scholar and journalist; he spent his nights working in the theater directing both repertory works as well as productions of his own plays. Additionally, he played guitar in a band called Hell and High Water.

The late 1990s found Carr expanding his literary repertoire while working as librettist for the opera Merlin, a reinterpretation of the Arthurian legends, with his friend and composer, Ezequiel Vinao. A staged recital of the first scene was performed with a full orchestra at the Paris Opera House in 1999. The work is unfinished.

== Personal life and death ==
Carr lived most of his life on Manhattan's Lower East Side, spending his summers and many weekends at his family's home in Cherry Plain, New York. In 2000, he bought his own property, known as Misery Mountain, in Cherry Plain; and in 2006 he moved there permanently. He shared his home with his Siberian rescue cat, Masha, for 17 years. Masha died in April 2022. Carr revealed he had been diagnosed with terminal cancer in 2024, and died at his home in Cherry Plain on May 23, aged 68.

== Publications ==
=== Books ===
Kreizler series

- The Alienist (1994) (won 1995 Anthony Award for Best First Novel)
- The Angel of Darkness (1997) ISBN 0-7515-2275-9
- Surrender, New York (2016)

Other novels

- Casing the Promised Land (1980) ISBN 978-0060107079
- Killing Time (2000)
- The Italian Secretary (2005); an authorized Sherlock Holmes mystery
- The Legend of Broken (2012) ISBN 978-0812984521

Nonfiction

- America Invulnerable: The Quest for Absolute Security from 1912 to Star Wars (co-written with James Chace) (1989) ISBN 0-671-61778-8
- The Devil Soldier: The American Soldier of Fortune Who Became a God in China (1992) ISBN 978-0679761280
- The Lessons of Terror: A History of Warfare Against Civilians: Why It Has Always Failed and Why It Will Fail Again (2002) ISBN 9780375760747

Memoir

- My Beloved Monster: Masha, the Half-wild Rescue Cat Who Rescued Me (2024)

=== Anthologies ===
- Carr, Caleb (2006). "'Some Analytical Genius, No Doubt'". In Greenberg, MH; Lellenberg, JL; Stashower, D (eds.). The Ghosts in Baker Street: New Tales of Sherlock Holmes. Carroll & Graf. ISBN 0-7867-1400-X.
- Chace, James; Carr, Caleb (2006). "The United States, the U.N., and Korea". In Robert Cowley (ed.). The Cold War: A Military History. Random House Publishing. ISBN 0-8129-6716-X.
- Carr, Caleb (2003). "William Pitt the Elder and the Avoidance of the American Revolution". In Robert Cowley (ed.). What Ifs? of American History, Eminent Historians Imagine What Might Have Been. Penguin. ISBN 0-425-19818-9.
- Carr, Caleb (2001). "Poland 1939". In Robert Cowley (ed.). No End Save Victory: Perspectives on World War II. Penguin Publishing. ISBN 0-425-18338-6.
- Carr, Caleb (2001). "VE Day--November 11, 1944 The Unleashing of Patton and Montgomery". In Robert Cowley (ed.). What If? 2: Eminent Historians Imagine What Might Have Been. ISBN 0-425-18613-X.
- Carr, Caleb (1999). "Napoleon Wins at Waterloo". In Robert Cowley (ed.). What If?: The World's Foremost Military Historians Imagine What Might Have Been. National Geographic Books. ISBN 0-425-17642-8.

=== Columns ===
- 2003 New York Observer. Historical Context M.I.A.: Blame the Commander in Chief
- 2003 New York Observer. On Beholding Baghdad
- 2003 New York Observer. Handicapping Military Is Order of the Day; Maureen Is Feasting
- 2003 New York Observer. The Ferocious Spectacle in Baghdad
- 2003 New York Observer. Fear Subsuming Offensive Goals of War on Iraq
- 2003 New York Observer. Strategic Bombing Brings Ups Quandary of Military Ethics
- 2003 New York Observer. Trouble in Turkey, Al Qaeda Capture Intensify the Heat
- 2003 New York Observer. Bush's Conflict: Military Methods At War For Iraq

=== Opinion pieces ===
- Carr, Caleb (1974). "Letters to the Editor: Kissinger's 19th-Century Diplomacy" (PDF). The New York Times.
- Carr, Caleb (April 13, 1986). "About Men; An Incident of Wolves". The New York Times.
- Carr, Caleb (December 26, 1987). "Security Precedes Credibility". The New York Times.
- Carr, Caleb (September 16, 1993). "The Humanitarian Illusion". The New York Times.
- Carr, Caleb (July 25, 1997). "Myths and Criminal Masterminds". The New York Times.
- Carr, Caleb (December 18, 1997). "Myths and Criminal Masterminds: The Ramsey Case Revisited". The New York Times.
- Carr, Caleb (1999). "When Considering Ground Troops in Kosovo, Remember Sherman". Los Angeles Times. ProQuest 421427282.
- Carr, Caleb (August 1, 2001). "Information Poisoning". Salon. Archived from the original on October 31, 2011.
- Carr, Caleb (August 7, 2001). "The Myth of a Perfect Defense". The New York Times.
- Carr, Caleb (September 23, 2001). "Americans Don't Understand Their Heritage Is Itself a Threat". The New York Times Magazine.
- Carr, Caleb (December 21, 2001). "The Art of Knowing the Enemy". The New York Times.
- Carr, Caleb (July 27, 2002). "Costs of Targeting Civilians". The New York Times.
- Carr, Caleb (2005). "Wrong Definition For a War". The Washington Post.
- Carr, Caleb (April 7, 2006). "Let Them Have Their Civil War". The Washington Post.
- Carr, Caleb (July 30, 2006). "Why Good Countries Fight Dirty Wars". Los Angeles Times.
- Carr, Caleb (August 12, 2006). "A war of escalating errors". Los Angeles Times.
- Carr, Caleb (2012). "To Fiction, Through History". The Wall Street Journal.
- Carr, Caleb (December 2015). "The Frantic Media Response to San Bernardino Is Making Us Less Safe". Vanity Fair.
- Carr, Caleb (2015). "Let Europe lead the war in Syria: History counsels caution for American troops". New York Daily News. Archived from the original on November 30, 2015.
- Carr, Caleb (2015). "If France wants to succeed against Islamic State, it should study the U.S. invasion of Afghanistan". Los Angeles Times.
- Carr, Caleb (March 31, 2015). "Defeating ISIS, slowly but surely: Don't panic, and don't expect a Hiroshima moment". New York Daily News. Archived from the original on April 3, 2016.

=== Journal publications ===
- 2007 "Terrorism": Why the Definition Must be Broad, World Policy Journal, Vol. 24, No.4, (Spring, 2007), pp. 47–50
- 1996/1997 Terrorism as Warfare: The Lessons of Military History, World Policy Journal, Vol.13, No.4, (Winter, 1996/1997), pp. 1–12
- 1995: Internationalism in the Age of Factionalism, World Policy Journal, Vol. 12, No. 2, (Summer, 1995), pp. 67–70
- 1994: The Dark Knight, MHQ: The Quarterly Journal of Military History, Vol. 6, No. 3, (Spring, 1994),
- 1994: Aldrich Ames and the Conduct of American Intelligence, World Policy Journal, Vol. 11, No. 3 (Fall, 1994), pp. 19–28
- 1993: The Consequences of Somalia, World Policy Journal, Vol. 10, No. 3 (Fall, 1993), pp. 1–4
- 1992: The American Rommel, MHQ: The Quarterly Journal of Military History, Vol. 4, No. 4, (Summer, 1992)
- 1990: The Troubled Genius of Oliver Cromwell, MHQ: The Quarterly Journal of Military History, Vol. 2, No. 4, (Summer, 1990)
- 1989: The Man of Silence, MHQ: The Quarterly Journal of Military History, Vol. 2, No. 4, (Spring, 1989)

=== Reviews ===
- Carr, Caleb (2002) The New York Times. Dealing With the Work of a Fiend
- Carr, Caleb (2000) The New York Times. Nor Any Drop to Drink
- Carr, Caleb (1993) The New York Times. James the Ripper?
- Carr, Caleb (1992) The New York Times. Should War Be Left to The Generals?
- Carr, Caleb (1992) The New York Times. Minnesota Death Trip

=== Other ===
- "Combating Terrorism: Axis of Evil, Multilateral Containment or Unilateral Confrontation". House Hearing, 107 Congress. April 16, 2002.
