= Greenwich House Music School =

Coordinates: 40.732197°N 74.004563°W

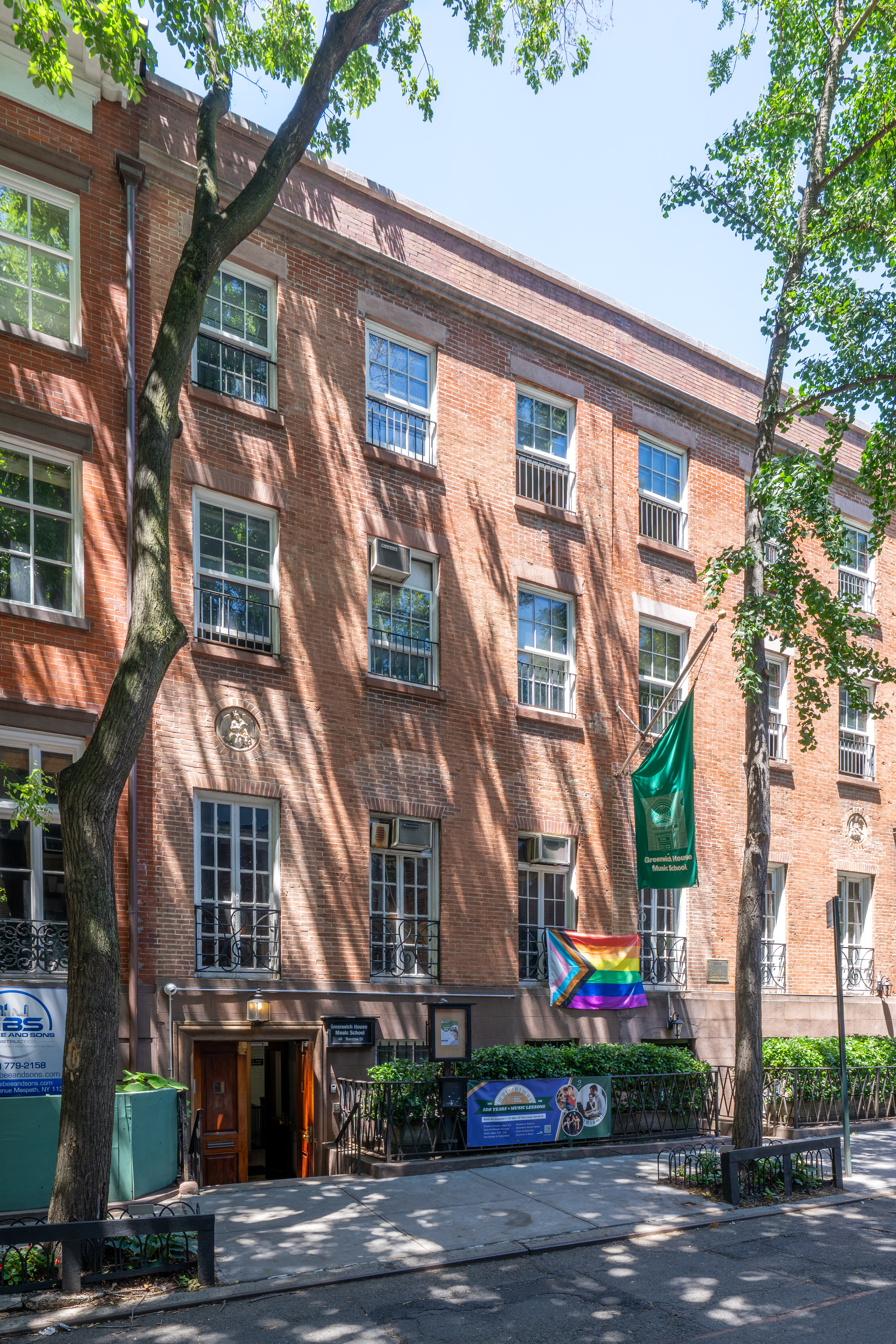
Greenwich House Music School, located at 46 Barrow St, NYC.

Greenwich House Music School is a community arts school located at 46 Barrow Street in New York City's Greenwich Village.

== Background ==
The School is a part of Greenwich House, an organization started in 1902 as part of the settlement movement providing arts education and social service programs. Greenwich House Music School was started in 1905 by the Greenwich House founder, Mary Kingsbury Simkhovitch, as a place for immigrant children to learn music after school, and has grown into a community music, art and dance school for both children and adults. Today, approximately 40 faculty members teach a range of instruments including piano, strings, guitar, harp, percussion, woodwinds, brass and Suzuki Violin. In addition to music, the school teaches early childhood classes in music and art, as well as ballet for children 3.5–18 years of age.

The Renee Weiler Concert Hall is located on the school's second floor, and hosts a variety of concerts all year long, including partnerships with local venues such as Caffe Vivaldi, and the avant garde jazz series Sound It Out, named by NYC Jazz Record as one of the top five best jazz venues in New York City. In addition to faculty and student recitals, the school produces a community concert series each year, Uncharted. In 2014, the School hosted Cafe Au Go Go Revisited, an homage to the famous cafe on Bleecker Street of the same name that ran from 1964 to 1970.

Notable faculty members include long time Piano Chair, German Diez (1924-2014), Morton Subotnick, sometimes referred to as the grandfather of Electronic Music, and current faculty Brandee Younger, jazz harpist. Notable alumni include Bobby Lopez, the Tony, Grammy, Emmy and Academy Award-winning composer for the movie Frozen, Avenue Q and Book of Mormon, as well as Erika Nickrenz of the Eroica Trio.

Greenwich House Music School was named by CBS New York as one of the best music schools for adults in New York City, and is a member of the National Guild for Community Arts Education.

== Notable performers ==
- Meredith Monk
- Hilary Hahn
- John Cage
- Edgar Varese
- David Amram
- Tim Berne
- Arturo O'Farrill
- Isaac Stern
- Ruth Laredo
- Natasha Ghent

== Uncharted Concert Series ==
Uncharted is Greenwich House Music School's very own concert series featuring high-profile local artists debuting first-time performances of new work or new collaborations. Uncharted covers a broad selection of genres, from jazz to R&B, folk to pop, theater to global rock. Concerts are staged in the School's Renee Weiler Concert Hall, an intimate 90-person room featuring excellent acoustics and a pair of Steinway grand pianos. The series is designed to offer a safe place for artists to take risks. In 2015, Uncharted premiered new work by Marc Ribot & Emeline Michel, Doris Duke performing artist award winner, Cynthia Hopkins, and hot jazz artist, Bria Skonberg
