= 26, 28, and 30 Jones Street =

Houses in Manhattan, New York

- Houses at 26, 28 and 30 Jones Street
- U.S. National Register of Historic Places
- U.S. Historic district – Contributing property
- New York State Register of Historic Places
- New York City Landmark
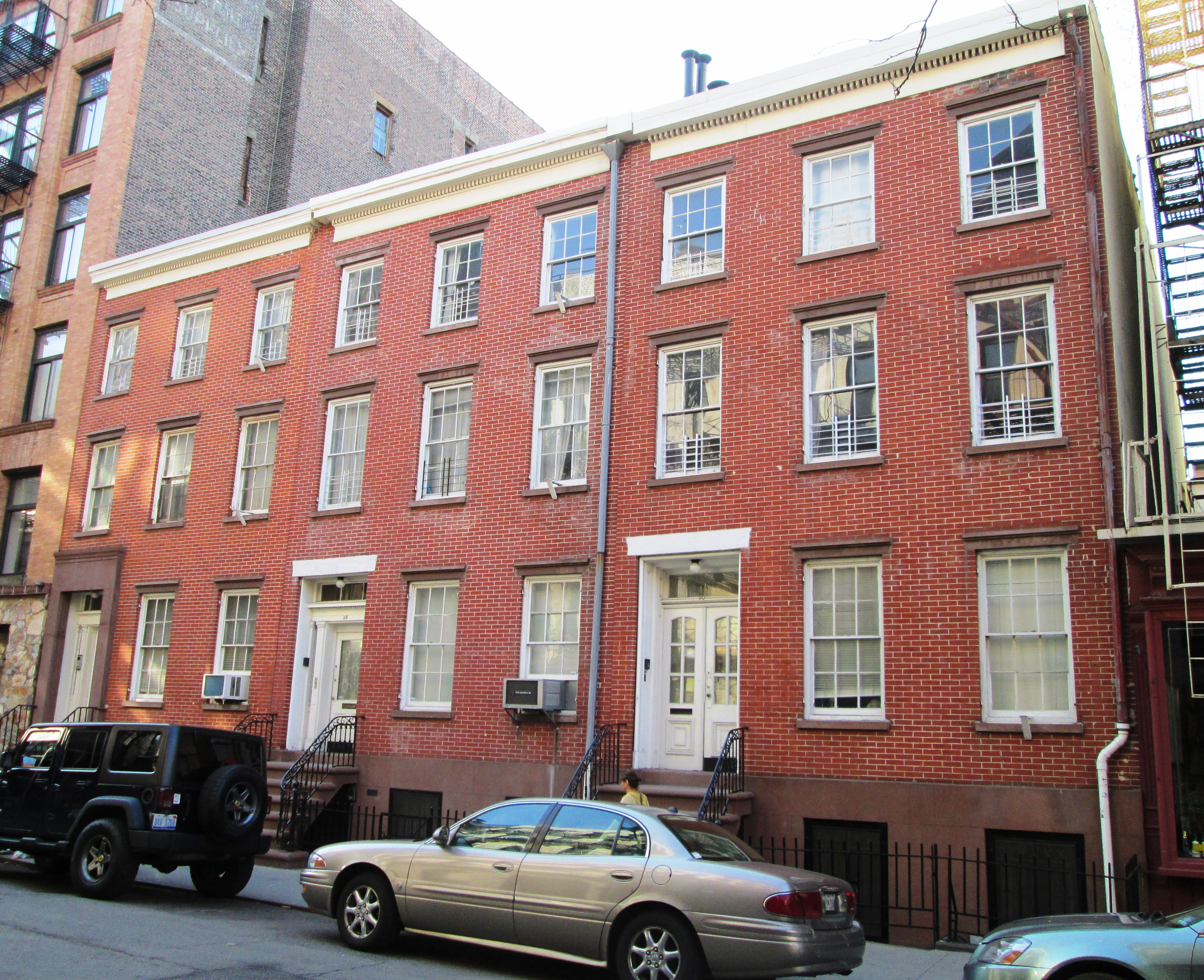

- Location within New York
- Location: 26, 28 and 30 Jones St., New York, New York
- Coordinates: 40.7316°N 74.0030°W
- Area: less than one acre
- Built: 1844
- Architectural style: Greek Revival
- Part of: South Village Historic District (ID14000026)
- NRHP reference No.: 82003379
- NYSRHP No.: 06101.000110, 06101.000029, 06101.000392
- NYCL No.: 0208, 0209, 0210

Significant dates
- Added to NRHP: 1982-06-03
- Designated NYSRHP: 1982-08-23
- Designated NYCL: 1966-04-19

26, 28, and 30 Jones Street are three historic Greek Revival-style rowhouses on Jones Street in the Greenwich Village neighborhood of Manhattan in New York City, New York, US. Built c. 1844, the rowhouses each have brick facades with three stories above a raised basement. Each building has a stoop with a wrought-iron railings, and a cornice with dentils. The designs are attributed to Henry Hoople Mott. The buildings are on the National Register of Historic Places and are designated as New York City Landmarks.

== Description ==
The houses at 26, 28, and 30 Jones Street are located on Jones Street in the Greenwich Village neighborhood of Manhattan in New York City, New York, US. The three rowhouses are in the Greek Revival style. They are among the few remaining buildings of their type on Jones Street. The original buildings' architects and builders have not been determined, although the AIA Guide to New York City attributes the design for all three houses to Henry Hoople Mott. The houses are next to 32 Jones Street, which once housed Caffe Vivaldi.

Each building is three stories high above a raised basement. The facades are made of red brick, while the entry stoops, basements, and window trimmings are made of brownstone. All three buildings are divided vertically into three bays, each with a wooden sash window. The stoops are in the leftmost bay of each house and all have wrought-iron railings. The National Park Service's 1982 report about the buildings indicated that 26 Jones Street had a stucco frame and a replica handrail.

The tops of the stoops originally had a single door recessed between a pair of pilasters and are surrounded by sidelights next to it and transom windows above. The original door at number 30 has been replaced with double doors. The space above the transom window of each doorway has an entablature. Above the topmost story, each building also has a cornice with dentils. There are party walls subdividing the three houses.

== History ==
The houses at 26, 28, and 30 Jones Street date from around 1844 and, according to tax records, were originally respectively owned by Jane S. Paradise, Dorothy Peterson, and John Moore. According to the New York City Landmarks Preservation Commission (LPC), numbers 28 and 30 were both constructed in that year. Number 26 was constructed starting in 1843 and was still not complete in 1844, when the trustee for Paradise's estate, Jesse W. Benedict, took over. All three buildings changed ownership multiple times in the 19th century. The first ownership transfers for any of these buildings took place in 1848, when Abraham Bassford bought number 26 and William Waring bought number 30. The other house, number 28, remained in the same ownership until 1855, when Richard Yerance took over. 26 and 28 Jones Street remained single-family housing when Greenwich Village residents began moving northward in the 1850s, while 30 Jones Street was subdivided into multiple units at that time.

In 1902, the Greenwich House settlement house was founded at 26 Jones Street, due to the area's proximity to the relatively poor Little Italy enclave. Initially, number 26 was occupied by Greenwich House's founder Mary Kingsbury Simkhovitch, along with her family and five employees. In 1905, Greenwich House was obtained by the Greenwich House's parent organization, the Cooperative Social Settlement Society. Greenwich House Cooperative Apartments Inc. obtained 26 and 28 Jones Street in 1921. The same company bought 30 Jones Street in 1929 as an extension to the neighboring properties.

The houses were depicted on the cover of Bob Dylan's 1963 album The Freewheelin' Bob Dylan. One of the buildings' residents in the late 20th century was Irma Simonton Black, an author who was found murdered there in 1972. The buildings were designated as New York City Landmarks in 1966 and added to the National Register of Historic Places on June 3, 1982. The houses also became part of the city-designated Greenwich Village Historic District in 2010, and they were added to the NRHP-designated South Village Historic District in 2014.

== See also ==
- List of New York City Designated Landmarks in Manhattan below 14th Street
- National Register of Historic Places listings in Manhattan below 14th Street

== Sources ==
- "National Register of Historic Places Inventory/Nomination: Houses at 26, 28 and 30 Jones Street" (PDF). National Park Service. With accompanying pictures
- Klose, Olivia; Kurshan, Virginia; Percival, Marianne (June 22, 2010). Greenwich Village Historic District Extension II (PDF) (Report). New York City Landmarks Preservation Commission.
