= Carola Woerishoffer =

American labor activist and settlement worker

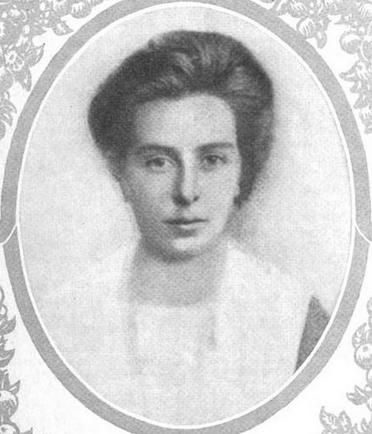
Carola Woerishoffer, from a 1912 publication.

Emma Carola Woerishoffer (August 1885 — September 11, 1911) was an American labor activist and settlement worker.

== Early life and education ==
Emma Carola Woerishoffer was born in New York City, the daughter of German-born banker Charles Frederick Woerishoffer and Anna Uhl Woerishoffer. Her grandmother was journalist and philanthropist Anna Ottendorfer. In 1886, her father died, leaving her a large inheritance. She attended the Brearley School and Bryn Mawr College, studying economics and philosophy.

== Activism ==
After finishing college in 1907, Woerishoffer became a resident and a member of the board of managers at the Greenwich House settlement. She funded Committee on Congestion of Population, and the New York Congestion Exhibit (1908). She joined Women's Trade Union League and donated thousands to their work; active in New York Consumers League, ran the League's Label Shop; 1909 undercover as a laundry worker for four months, to gather information on hazardous working conditions. She testified about her experiences before a New York state commission on labor later that year. She participated in the New York shirtwaist strike of 1909, accompanying arrested strikers to court; it was estimated that she paid bail for over 200 women strikers, and donated more to the union's strike fund.

== Career and death ==
In 1910, Woerishoffer's money helped establish the New York State Bureau of Industries and Immigration. She passed the Civil Service examination to work as a special investigator for the bureau. She was part of the investigation following the Triangle Shirtwaist Factory fire. While traveling to a labor camp for her work in 1911, died in an automobile accident near Cannonsville, New York. She was 26 years old. Among the speakers at Woerishoffer's memorial service were Edwin Robert Anderson Seligman, Florence Kelley, Helen Marot, Mary Kingsbury Simkhovitch, George McAneny, and M. Carey Thomas. The following year, her Bryn Mawr classmates and Ida M. Tarbell assembled and published a biographical tribute to Woerishoffer. Her estate donated $750,000 to her alma mater; it was used to establish Bryn Mawr's graduate department of Social Economy and Social Research.

Her nephew was art collector Antoine Seilern.
