= 57 Great Jones Street =

Commercial building in Manhattan, New York

General information
- Location: 57 Great Jones Street; Manhattan, New York, U.S.
- Coordinates: 40°43′36″N 73°59′33″W
- Owner: 57 Great Jones Street LLC

57 Great Jones Street is a building in the NoHo historic district of Manhattan, New York City. It first gained attention as the clubhouse of the Five Points Gang, a criminal organization that was said to be the "largest and best organized gang in New York," and it was the site of a bystander's murder during a gun fight in 1905. In the 1980s, when the building was owned by pop artist Andy Warhol, it served as the home and studio of artist Jean-Michel Basquiat and was the site of his fatal overdose in 1988. In 2023, actress Angelina Jolie rented it for use as a space for artistic collaboration.

The building is a two-story brick structure on an "L"-shaped lot measuring about 25 feet wide and 75 feet deep. It possesses a facade that predominantly features arched windows in a Romanesque Revival style. Although residential tenants have sometimes lived there, most occupants have been businesses. Often used as a saloon in early years, it has also been occupied by small manufacturers, retail outlets, auction houses, restaurants, and galleries.

== Early history of the site ==
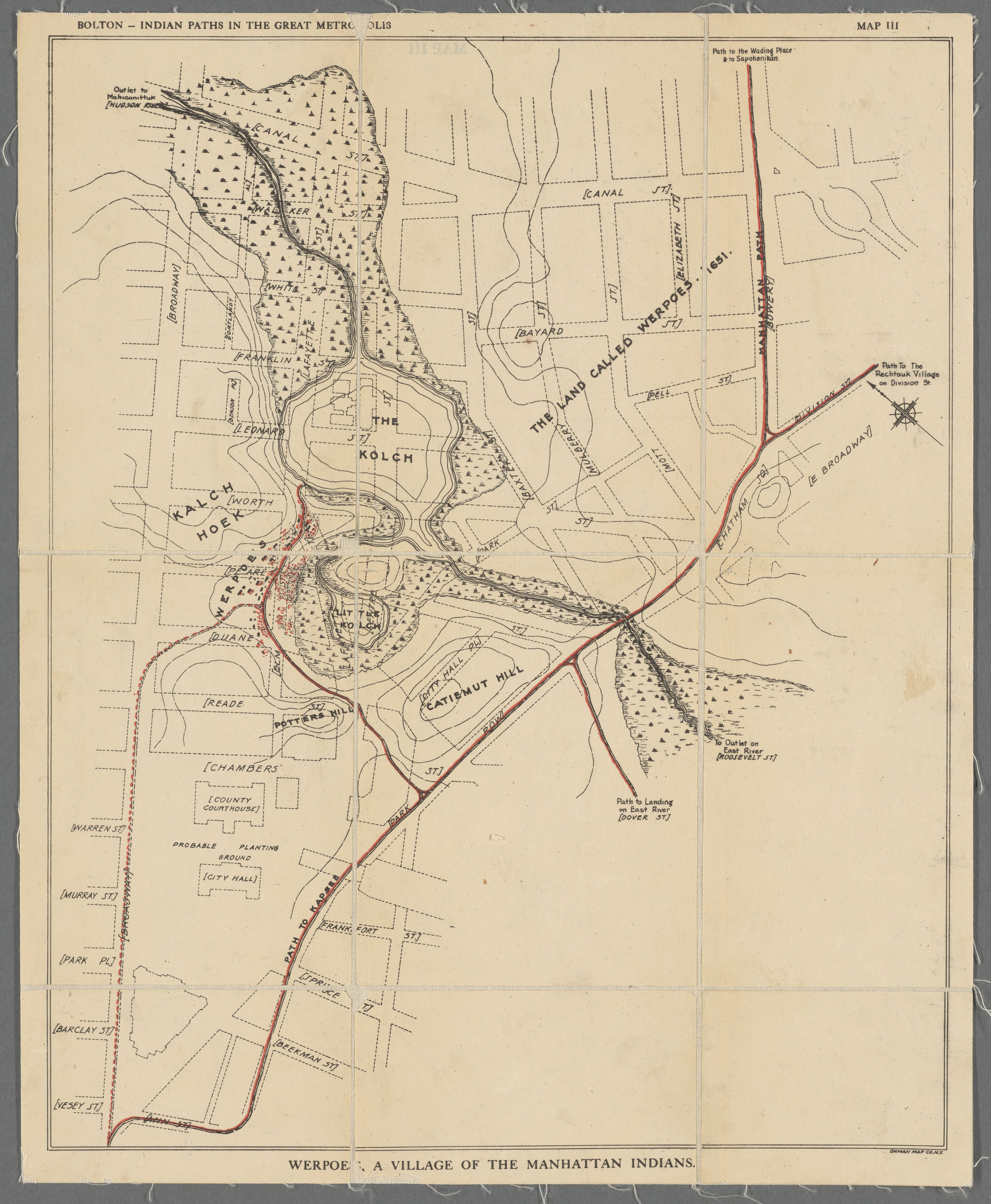
Map showing Werpoes, a village of the Canarsee Indians

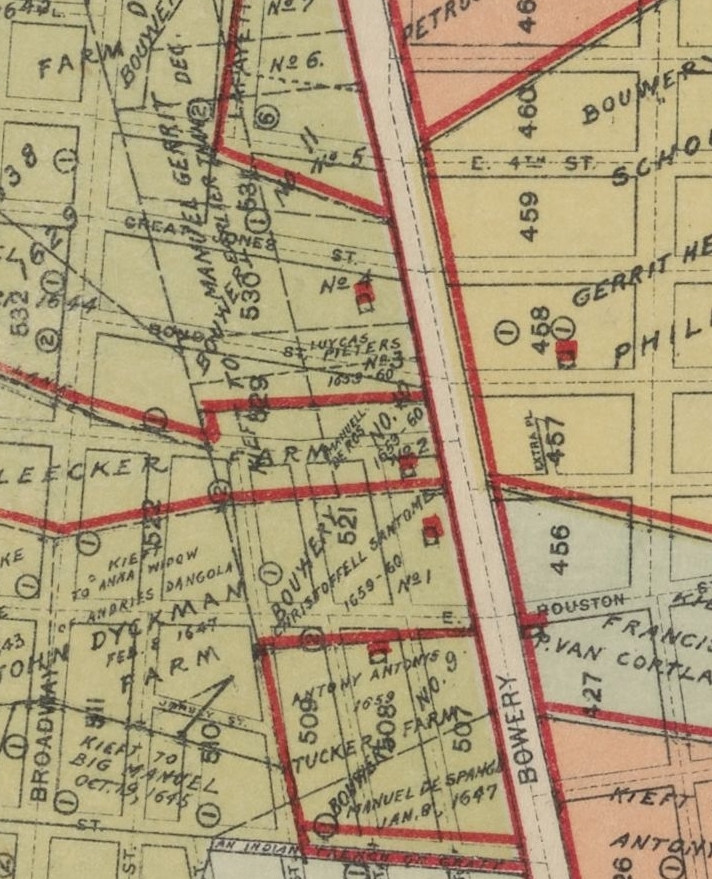
Detail of a map of Dutch land grants showing the holding of Salomon Pieters (No. 4, adjoining the Luycas Pieters holding)

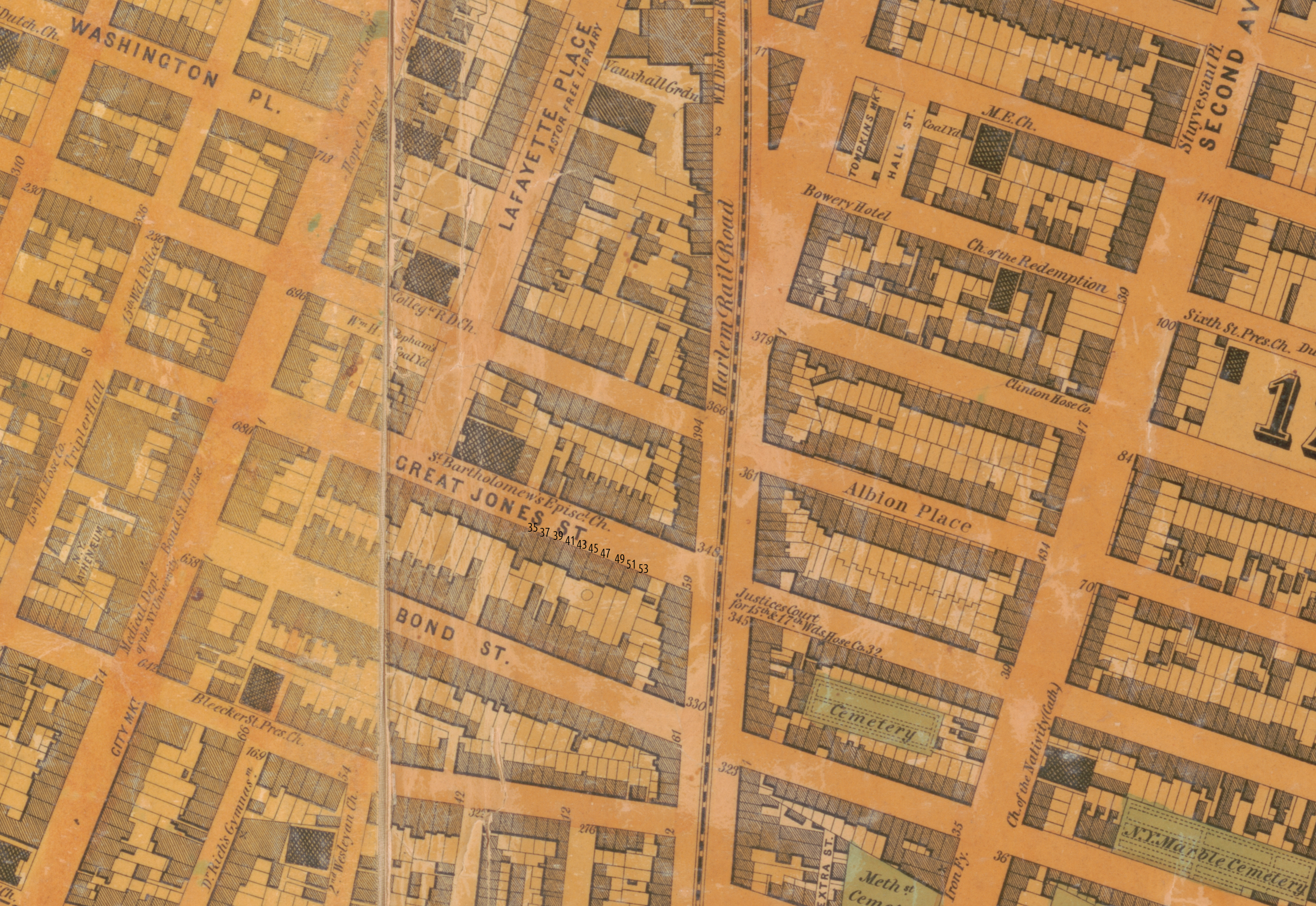
Detail of an 1852 map by John F. Harrison showing Great Jones and Bond Streets and showing a structure at the back of an otherwise empty lot at 57 Great Jones Street

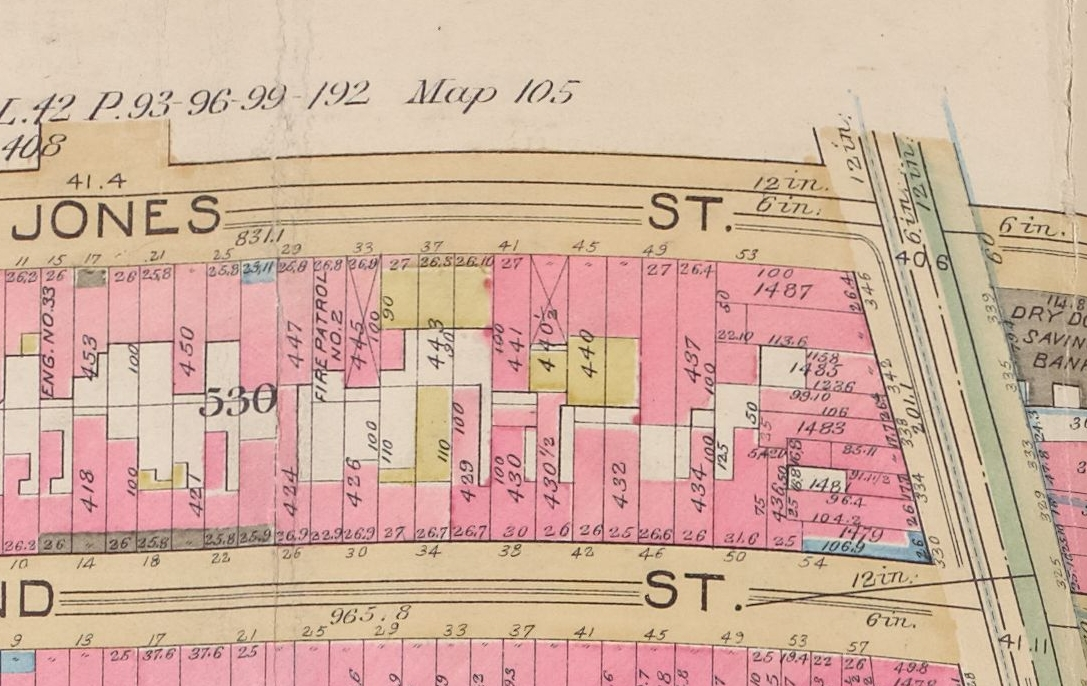
Detail of an 1891 map by George Washington Bromley

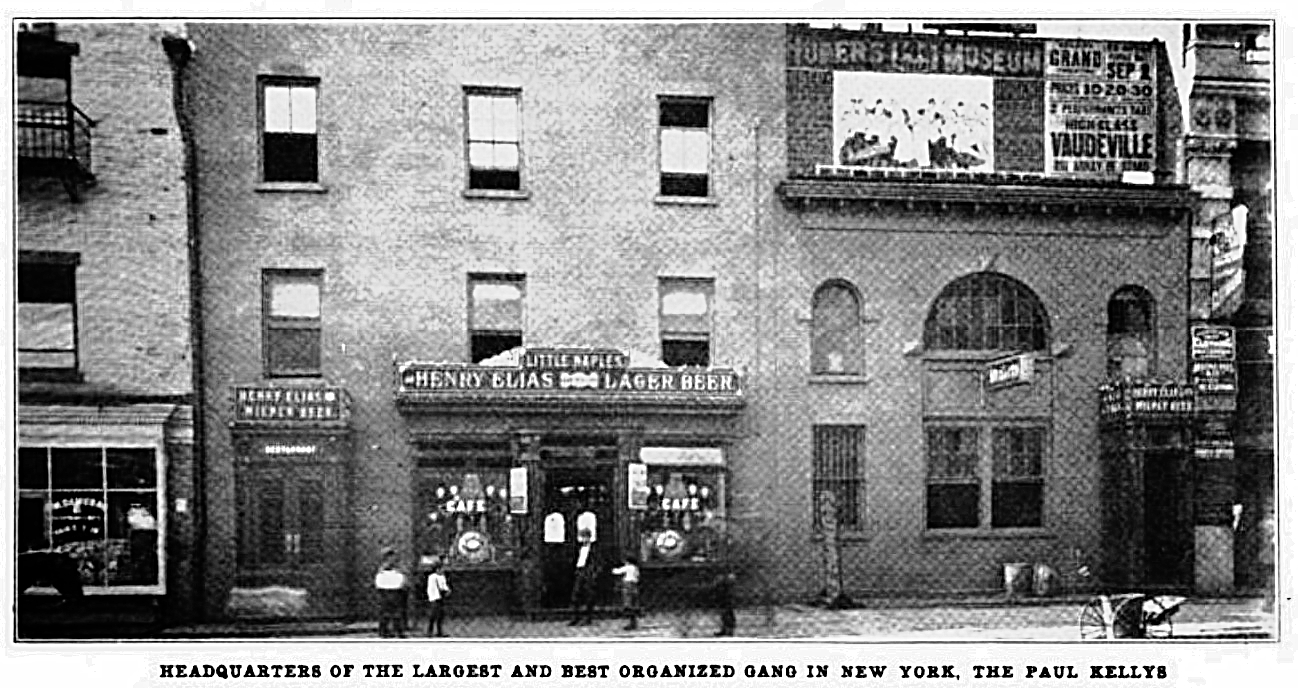
1905 Photo showing the Paul Kelly Association clubhouse and New Brighton dance hall at 57 Great Jones Street and the Little Naples saloon at 59 Great Jones Street

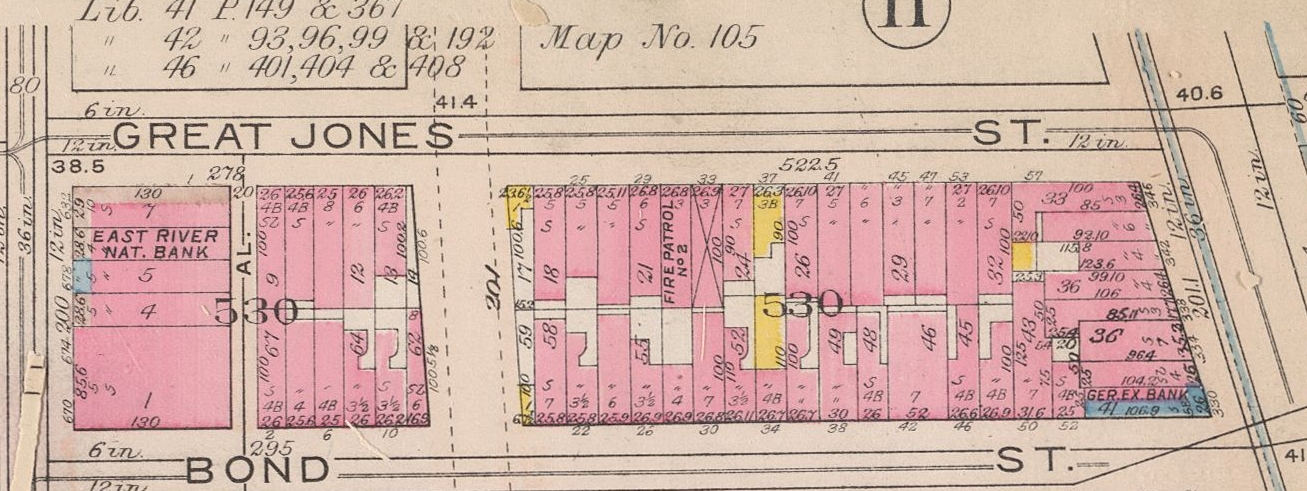
Detail of a 1911 map by George Washington Bromley showing addition at the back of the 57 Great Jones Street lot

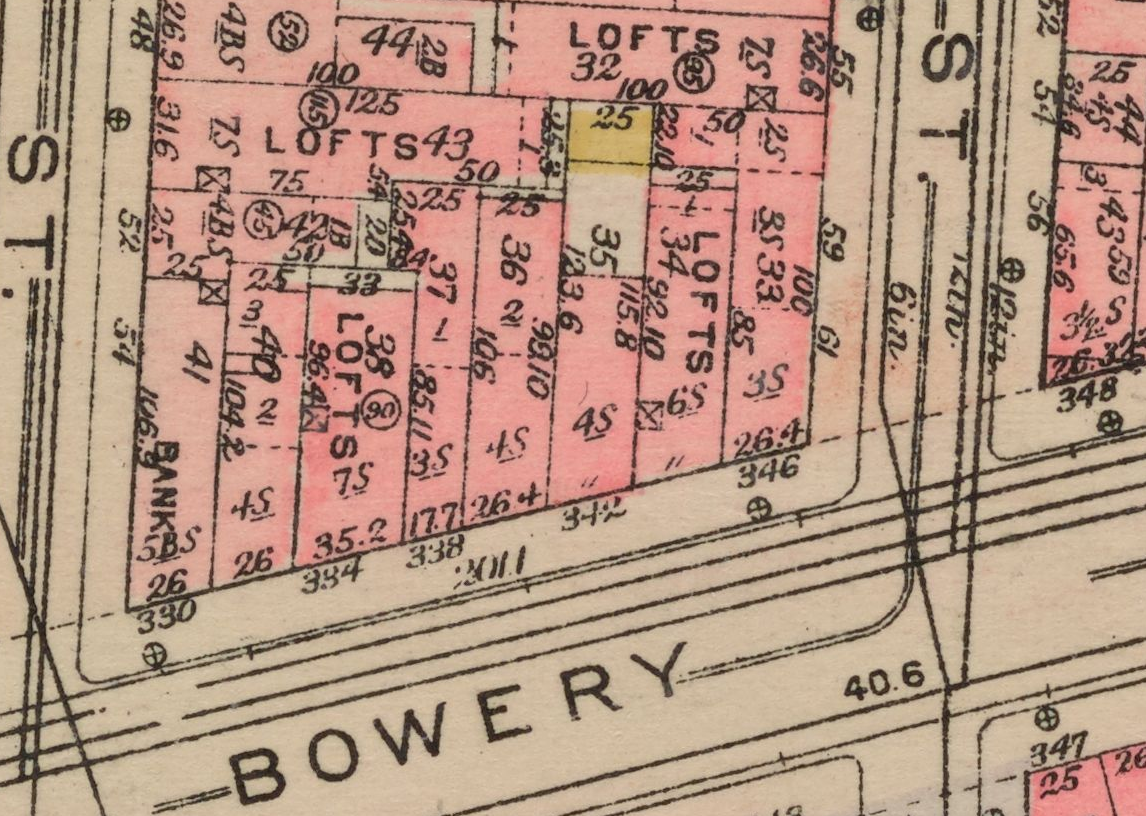
Detail of a 1927 map by George Washington Bromley

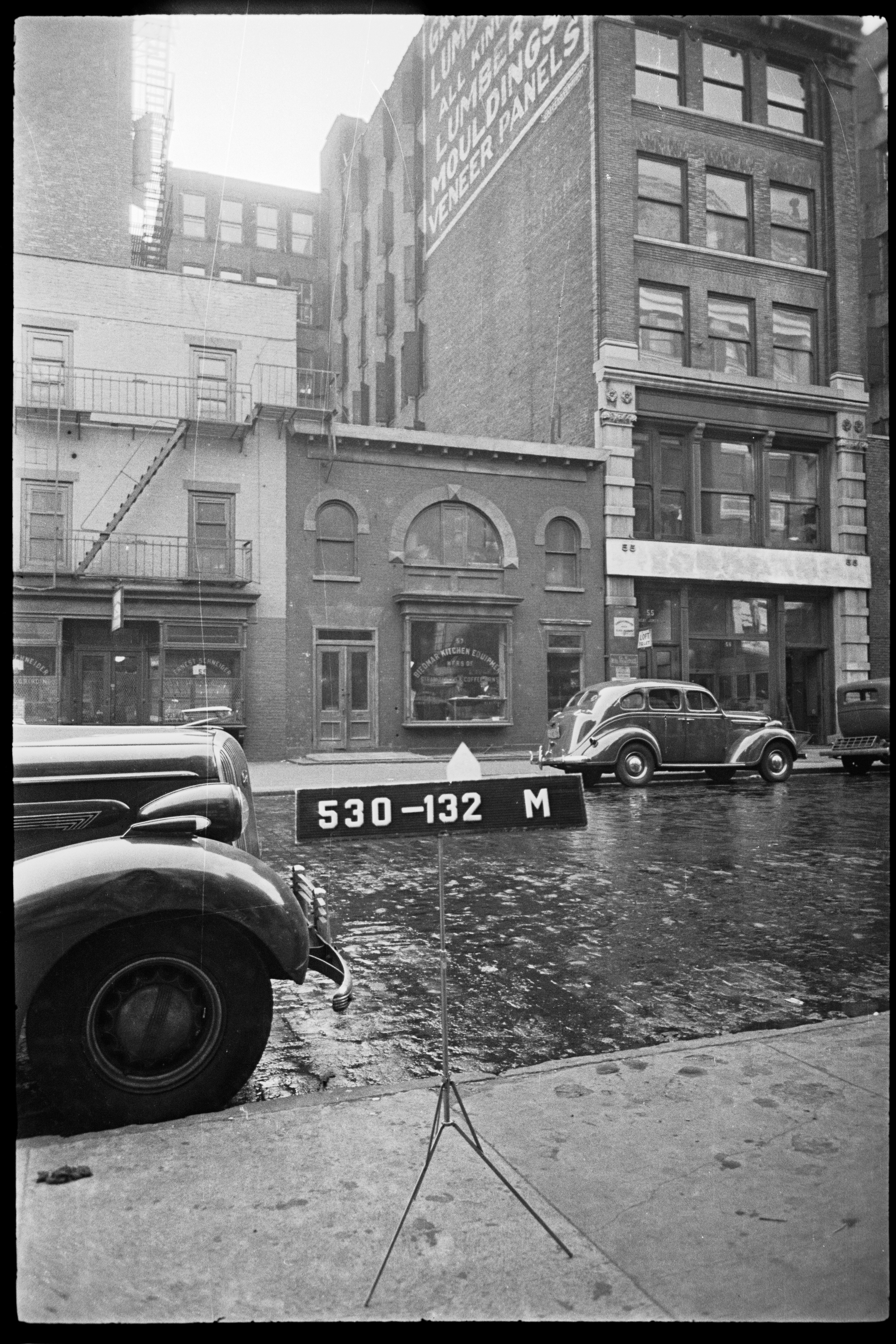
Tax photo taken in 1939 or 1940 showing 57 Great Jones Street (Block 530, Lot 132)

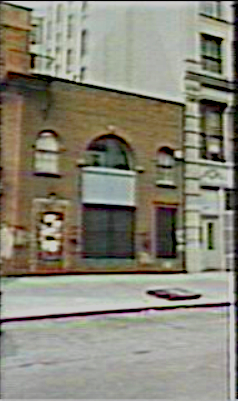
Tax photo taken in 1980 showing 57 Great Jones Street in color

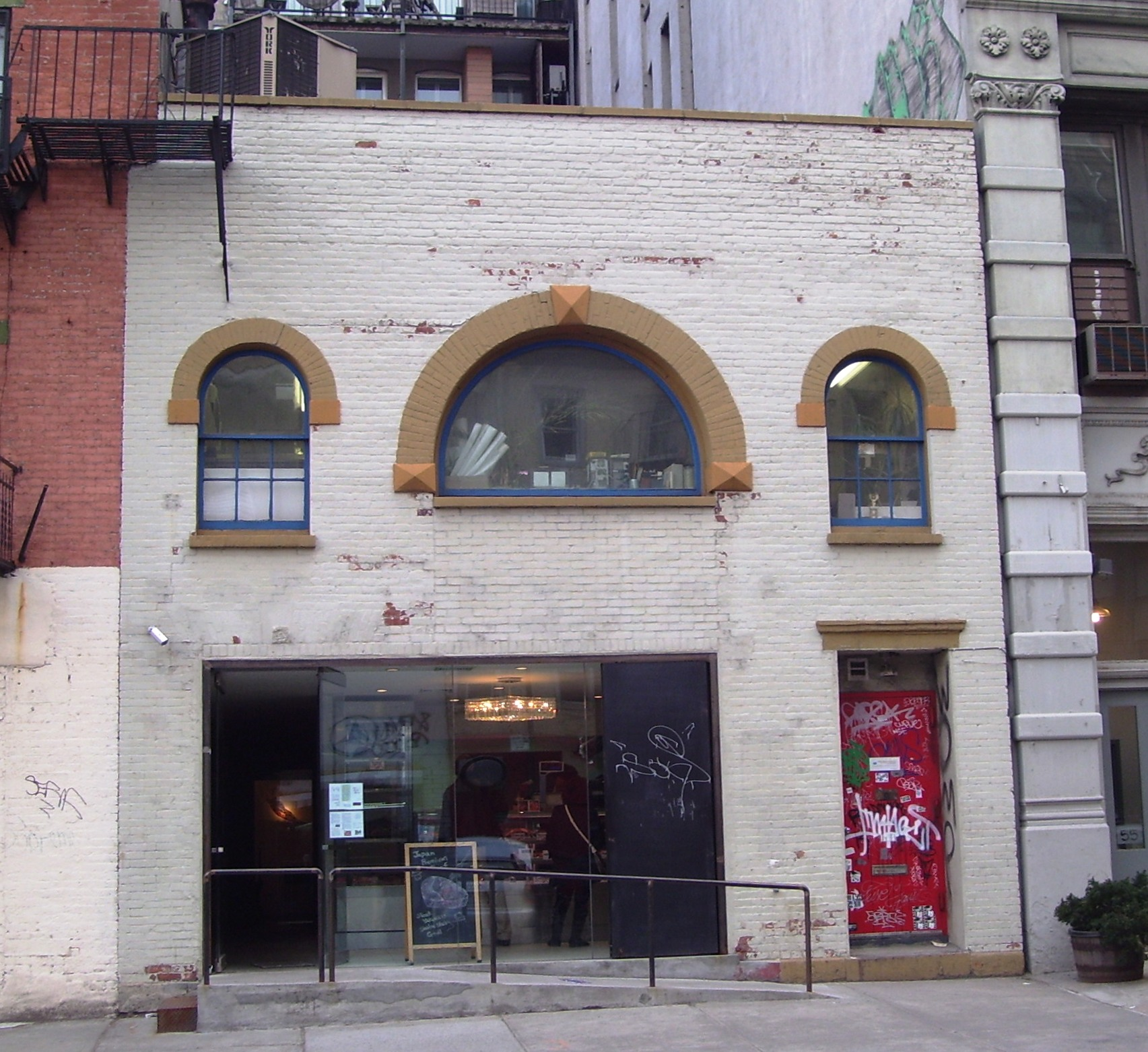
57 Great Jones Street in 2011

57 Great Jones Street is located in an area once dominated by the Canarsee, a Munsee-speaking band of Lenape Native Americans. It lies at the northern edge of an archaeological site dating from before 1651 known as Werpoes, or "watch hill". After a short-lived conflict between the Lenape and residents of colonial New Amsterdam, Director-General Stuyvesant created a buffer zone on the city's northern border. He granted small parcels of land to formerly-enslaved families on condition that they erect defensible fencing at a vulnerable point along the main road headed north out of the city. In 1659 or 1660 a formerly-enslaved man named Salomon Pieters received one of these plots, located in a place that would later become the intersection of Great Jones Street and the Bowery. A map published in 1928 shows the location as No. 4, directly above the grant to Luycas Pieters (No. 3).

In the decades following the American Revolution, the growth of Manhattan's population and the island's increasing prosperity brought rapid development north of the original city boundary, particularly along the Bowery. Starting with a few taverns to serve passing travelers, that street became an increasingly frequent destination for New Yorkers who patronized its "clothing stores, hotels, theaters, pawnshops, restaurants, bars, dance halls, and brothels", according to one historian.

The site of 57 Great Jones Street remained agricultural until the northward expansion of the city reached it at the end of the 18th century. In 1805 Samuel Jones, a prominent lawyer and politician, ceded the land on which, in 1806, Great Jones and adjacent Bond Street were constructed. Extending for two blocks from Broadway in the west to the Bowery in the east, it received the name Great Jones to distinguish it from another Manhattan Jones Street that was named after Samuel Jones's brother-in-law, Gardner Jones.

In the first decades of the 19th century, real estate speculators bought up the vacant lots that had been laid out on the grid established by the state-appointed Commissioners' Plan of 1811 and there followed a building boom that was characterized by one historian as a mania of construction. During this boom, fine townhouses were erected on the Broadway end of Great Jones Street, including one, at the corner, described by its owner, former mayor Philip Hone, as "a most delightful and comfortable residence". In 1845, a physician named Benjamin Bailey bought up land on the southwest corner of the other end of the street and built a house on the part of it that faced the Bowery. In advertising the land Bailey bought, a real estate agent gave the plot's dimensions: it was 26 feet, four inches wide on the Bowery side, 100 feet long on the Great Jones Street side, 25 feet wide at the back, and 107 feet 10 inches long on its south side. In 1847 Bailey added to this holding by buying a square piece of land measuring about 25 by 25 feet at the southwest corner of the parcel. A property map published in 1852 shows the configuration of the lot on which Bailey built the house and the two pieces of land that lay behind it. Designated as Lot 132 in Block 530 and together measuring about 25 feet wide and 50 feet deep, these two pieces of land, one lying behind 346 Bowery and the other lying behind 344 Bowery, became 57 Great Jones Street.

A real estate transaction of 1888 showed that a plot of land located at the back of 57 Great Jones Street and the back of 342 Bowery had by then been added to Lot 132. Measuring about 25 by 25 feet, this addition to the lot appears in a fire insurance map of 1891. The map mislabels the address of the lot as 53 rather than 57 Great Jones Street, and it treats 57 Great Jones Street and 456 Bowery as if they were the same building. It shows Lot 132 to have three brick buildings, the one facing Great Jones Street and two behind it. Fire insurance maps made in 1893 and 1897 give the same information except that in 1893, there is only one building behind the building that faced 57 Great Jones Street (a wood-frame structure) and in 1897, there is a brick building in that location and a frame building behind it. A fire insurance map of 1911 is similar to the 1893 and 1897 maps. It treats 57 Great Jones Street and 346 Bowery as if they were the same building, but it does give the correct house number to 57 Great Jones Street.

== Date of construction and façade ==
There is very little information about the design or construction of the buildings on Lot 132 during the 19th century. The New York City Property Information Portal (consulted in 2025) gave 1900 as the year the current building was erected. A photograph taken in 1905 shows the façade of this building and its neighbor, number 59, to the east. It depicts 57 Great Jones Street as a two-story building having a brick façade featuring three second-story windows in a distinctive Romanesque Revival style. The central 22-light window was contained in a round arch having a stone keystone and impost blocks and a brick lintel. The two smaller symmetrically placed flanking windows had a similar design. The cornice was also in Romanesque Revival style. The first floor had a doorway on the right side having a transom surmounted by a portico. Located one step up from street level, the doorway was accompanied by rectangular sash windows centered below the upper windows and matching them in width and height.

A photo taken for tax purposes in 1939 shows a fire escape on the front of 59 Great Jones Street to which there was access from the roof of 57 Great Jones Street. It shows no other changes to the second floor of 57 Great Jones Street. By that time the transom over the door had been reduced to a single pane of glass, the two central ground-floor windows had been replaced with a framed plate glass window, and the left-most sash window had been replaced with a transformed two-paned double door. Another tax photo, taken in 1980, shows the central ground-floor window replaced by a pair of sash windows surmounted by a panel and the double-door replaced by a single one. Photos taken in 2011 and 2016 show replacement of the central ground-floor windows with three contiguous floor-to-ceiling plate glass windows, removal of the surmounted panel, and replacement of the double door with a single full-glass door, now accessed by a ramp with railing.

In 1932, Lot 132 was extended in the east, toward the back of 342 Bowery. The extension changed the shape of the lot from a rectangle to one resembling the letter L. This shape is shown in a 2024 interactive map on the NYC Property Information Portal. Its dimensions on that website are shown to be about 75 feet on the longest side of the L (on the west), about 25 feet on and its shortest side (on the north) facing the street, and about 50 feet at the bottom of the L (on the south) lying behind 342 Bowery.

== Owners ==
In 1924, Benjamin Bailey's heirs sold the property to the first of a succession of real estate businesses that held the building from then to 1970. In that year, Andy Warhol's Factory Films, Inc. bought the building and later transferred ownership to Andy Warhol Enterprise, Inc. That organization held it until 1990. The building then passed to two real estate firms in succession.

List of owners:

- 1845: Dr. Benjamin Bailey, his heirs and estate
- 1924: Modern Grade Renting Co., Inc.
- 1924: Hancook Realty & Holding Corp.
- 1951: 57 Great Jones Street Realty Co., Inc.
- 1970: Factory Films Inc.
- 1974: Andy Warhol Enterprise, Inc.
- 1990: 57 Great Jones Street Associates (Robert Von Ancken and Leslie Garfield)
- 2005: 57 Great Jones Street LLC

== Tenants ==
=== 1840s to 1890s ===
In 1847, a mason named James Kinsey was manufacturing chimney pots, composition arches, and other baked clay architectural features in a building at 57 Great Jones Street. The 1852 property map shows the location of the building this business occupied on the southern of the two pieces of land that comprised Lot 132. A business directory published a year later lists a tavern, referred to as a "Porter House", run by John Gunning, at the address along with Kinsey's masonry. Kinsey's business, at back, and the porter house, facing the street, are shown on a 1857 fire insurance map, both of them depicted as two-story wood-frame structures. By that time one or both of the buildings contained rental apartments. In 1851 a man looking for work as a coachman gave his address as 57 Great Jones and a year later another man also listed that location as his home address.

Between 1852 and 1862, a man named Thomas Kavanagh operated a saloon at the address and, during 1862, he used it as a recruiting station for a regiment that was being formed for service in the Civil War. In 1872, a man named James Lyon operated a stable at 57 Great Jones Street and the following year an auctioneer named J.P. Traver took over the business. Traver soon expanded his sales rooms to include auctions of furniture and clothing out of three adjoining buildings: 57, 59, and 61 Great Jones Street. In the 1880s, another auctioneer, John A. Dunn, took over the sales rooms at 57 and 59 Great Jones Street and continued at that location into 1898. In 1885 an expressman gave 57 Great Jones Street as his address in advertising his business.

=== 1900s to 1990s ===
A club named the Briar Sweet Association rented the building in 1900. A year later, 57 Great Jones Street and 59 Great Jones Street were together used as a dance hall called New Brighton, a saloon called Little Naples, and a gang club run by the Paul Kelly Association. New Brighton, Little Naples, and the club closed following a gang fight and murder at the buildings in 1905.

A printer named Albert Glickman who ran a business called Paragon Press rented the building in 1909. By 1915, there was a Belgian passport office at the site and in 1920, it was home to the Washington Paper Company, maker of paper gums used in paper box and book binding. In 1922, the K & W Hat and Company did business there and in 1927, an unspecified business named Kramer Brothers gave the address as its place of business.

Between 1929 and 1945, 57 Great Jones Street was home to a business called Biedmar Kitchen Equipment and Metal Work. It was followed, in 1946, by a moving and storage company called Red Ball Van Lines. The building was home to real estate offices between 1947 and 1951, and between 1959 and 1977 it was rented by the Grand Wire Frame & Novelty Company. In 1977, the Thomas Publishing Company was located there. While Andy Warhol owned the building, he rented it to Walter Steding and later Jean-Michel Basquiat. Basquiat lived at the residence from 1983 until his death in 1988.

=== 1990s to present ===
After real estate appraiser Robert Von Ancken and his partner Leslie Garfield bought the building in 1990, they rented it first to a Japanese restaurant supply company and next to an upscale butcher shop called Japan Premium Beef. Between 2004 and about 2010 a Japanese restaurant called Hedeh operated beneath the butcher shop. In 2006, a small business called A-Works, operating mainly as a Japan-influenced publishing house, was located at 57 Great Jones Street.

Between 2010 and about 2021, an exclusive restaurant called Bohemian operated in the space vacated by Hedeh. The restaurant did not take reservations from the public but only from its regular diners and their friends and acquaintances. For a few months in 2018, the second floor was used as an art gallery called the Same Old Gallery, a reference to SAMO, the graffiti tag used by Basquiat and his friend Al Diaz. Between 2021 and 2023, an inventor named Adam Bly used space on the second floor of the building for a cloud computing business called System Inc.

In 2023, actress Angelina Jolie rented 57 Great Jones Street for a term of eight years and set up a for-profit public benefit corporation called Atelier Jolie at the site. She employed Bonetti/Kozerski Architecture to oversee its renovation, preserving Basquiat's early comics and Al Diaz's graffiti on the second-floor walls and leaving the façade available to the city's graffiti artists and taggers. She abandoned use of the second floor as a fashion studio after she realized, as she said, that it wasn't her love, and she replaced it with a gallery directed by an artist in residence. A 2025 New York Times article described Jolie as having envisioned the building as "a cultural locus, a clubhouse full of inspired and international creatives, and also a magnet for a curious public". By then, the building contained a café at the back and an art gallery in the front of its main floor and another art gallery and workshop space below. In 2025, French multimedia artist Prune Nourry was artist-in-residence and The Invisible Dog Art Center put on a show in the basement.

== Significant events ==
In 1905, gangster Paul Kelly founded the Paul Kelly Association as the headquarters for his Five Points Gang at 57–59 Great Jones Street, alongside his saloon Little Naples and the New Brighton dance hall. The gang operated with political protection in exchange for election fraud. That same year, a failed assassination attempt on Kelly by rival leader Jack Sirocco’s gang led to a deadly shoot-out in Little Naples, resulting in a bystander’s death and a manslaughter conviction for the shooter. Following the incident, Kelly gave up the lease and shifted his focus to corrupt political work through the garbage scow workers’ union.

In 1970, Pop artist Andy Warhol purchased 342 Bowery and 57 Great Jones Street. He connected the two properties at their backs and planned to build a theater in that location. New York artist Jean-Michel Basquiat began leasing 57 Great Jones Street on August 30, 1983. Unsure about the young artist's ability to pay the $4,000 monthly rent, Warhol noted in a diary entry that Basquiat was trying to get on a daily painting schedule, adding, "if he doesn't and he can't pay his rent it'll be hard to evict him." He subsequently insisted that a third party, Swiss art dealer Bruno Bischofberger, countersign the lease as guarantor. In February 1986, Warhol noted in his diary that Basquiat told him he had discovered a dead body in his backyard, apparently someone from the flophouse next door. After Warhol's death in 1987, his estate tried to evict Basquiat, but he was still living and working there when he died in 1988 at the age of 27. Afterwards, graffiti artists and taggers began defacing the building.

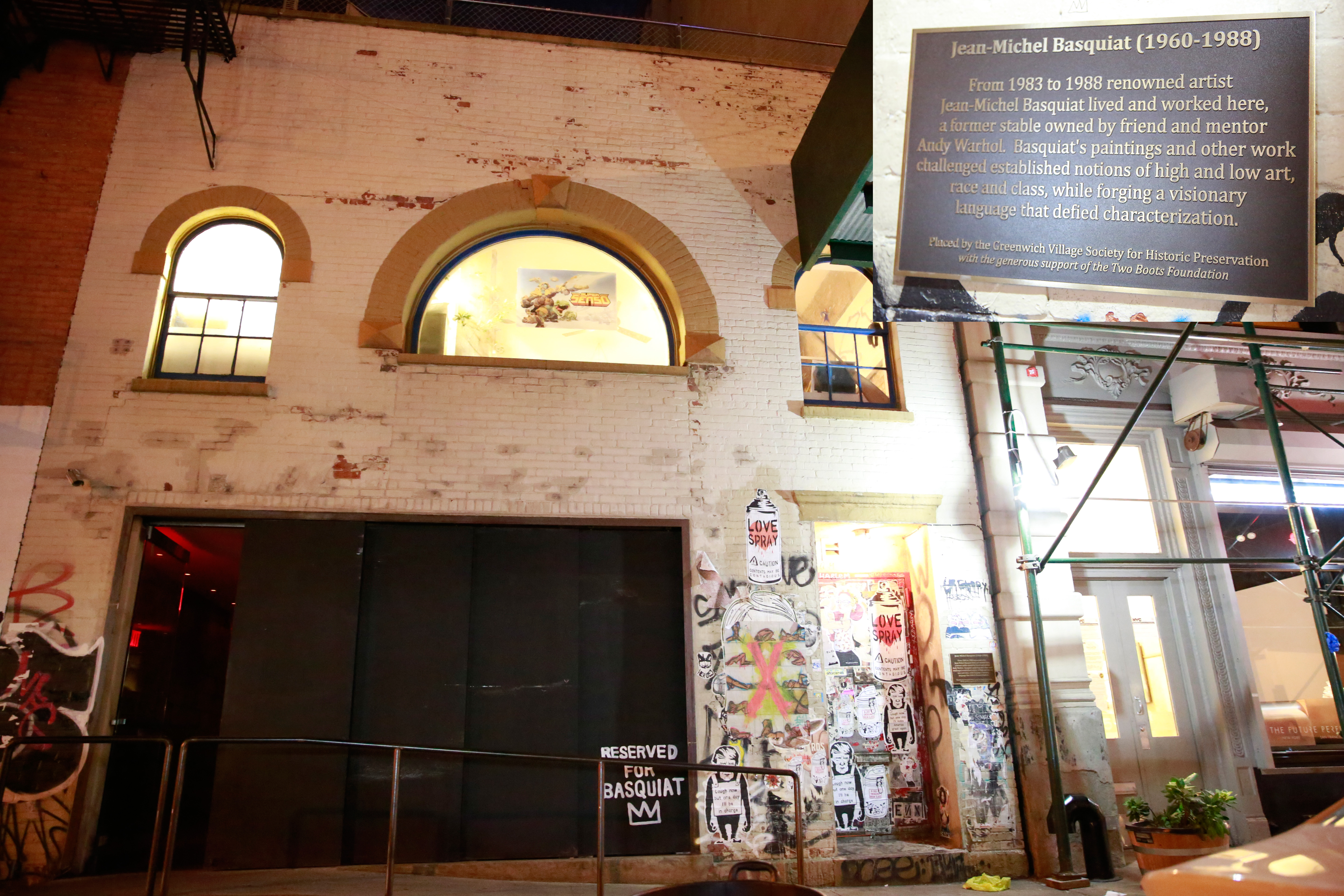
57 Great Jones Street with inset showing plaque affixed next to front door in 2016

In 2016, the Greenwich Village Society for Historic Preservation installed a commemorative plaque at the site. The graffiti, which reappeared after each attempt to remove or overpaint them, can be seen in photos taken in 2016 and on a more recent date. In 2023, the building's owner told a New York Times reporter, "I've tried repainting the front, but I eventually gave up. It's clearly still very important for young artists, even today, to put their mark on that facade."

In October 2025, City Council of New York and the Basquiat Estate added a street sign outside the building designating that part of Great Jones as "Jean-Michel Basquiat Way". Former city councilwoman Carlina Rivera and the hip-hop historian LeRoy McCarthy helped shepherd the honorary name.
