= Anne O'Hagan Shinn =

American journalist

Anne O'Hagan
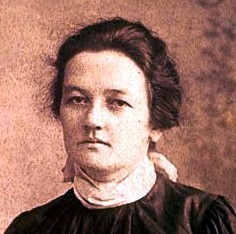
- c.1898
- Born: August 8, 1869; Washington, D.C.
- Died: June 24, 1933 (aged 63); New York City
- Education: Boston University
- Occupation: Writer

Anne O'Hagan Shinn (August 8, 1869 – June 24, 1933) was an American feminist, suffragist, journalist, and writer of short stories, regularly contributing to publications such as Vanity Fair, and Harper's. In particular, she is known for her writings detailing the exploitation of young women working as shop clerks in early 20th Century America.

== Early life and education ==
Anne O'Hagan was born in Washington, D. C. in 1869, daughter of Captain John O'Hagan and Mary Fennell O'Hagan. She graduated from Boston University in 1890.

== Career ==
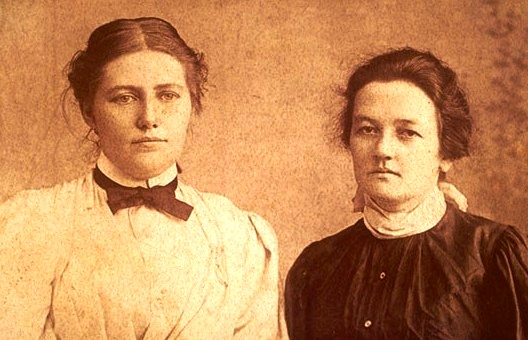
Mary Kingsbury Simkhovitch and Shinn, c. 1888 and by a London photographer. Simkovitch boarded with O'Hagan when she was at Columbia University.

O'Hagan was a member of Heterodoxy, a feminist debating club based in Greenwich Village and she was a founding officer of the Women's Democratic Union. She served on the board of the Equal Suffrage League of New York, and the Women's Suffrage Study Club, among other New York suffrage organizations. She also supported the reform of prohibition laws. O'Hagan was a member of the Protestant Church of St. Luke in the Fields in Greenwich Village at the same time as Eleanor Roosevelt.

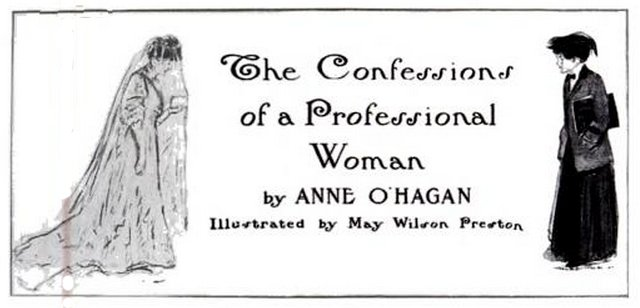
Confessions of a Professional Woman by Anne O'Hagan, illustrated by May Wilson Preston from Harper's Bazaar, September 1907

As a journalist, O'Hagan was a regular contributor to Vanity Fair, Harper's, Munsey's, Collier's, and other popular periodicals, often writing on feminist topics. For example, an article for Munsey's magazine in 1901 titled "The Athletic Girl," celebrated the entry of women and girls into active recreation, for their long-term health as well as for their release from restrictive clothing and passive pursuits. O'Hagan discusses the differing roles of the spinster and the married woman and how women can choose to be celibate and have mature conversations with single men.

Of particular interest to her was the exploitation of young women shop clerks. After suffrage, Shinn covered American politics for The New York Times, including a long interview with the future presidential candidate Alfred E. Smith in 1922.

O'Hagan participated in several collaborative fiction projects, where multiple authors would write chapters of a novel or series, including The Good Family series in Harper's Magazine (1907), and The Sturdy Oak serialized political novel in Collier's Magazine (1917). O'Hagan was also a prolific writer of short fiction.

== Personal life and legacy ==
Anne O'Hagan is thought to have lived with her mother until she married Francis Adin Shinn in 1908. She is thought to have written an anonymous article that described the problems of a modern single woman who lived with her old-fashioned mother. She died in June 1933, age 63, after a brief illness, in New York City. Her funeral was held in Litchfield, Connecticut, where she had a country home. The O'Hagan Shinn Scholarship Fund at Boston University was established in 1936 in her memory, for scholarships in English literature.
