= Vladimir Simkhovitch =

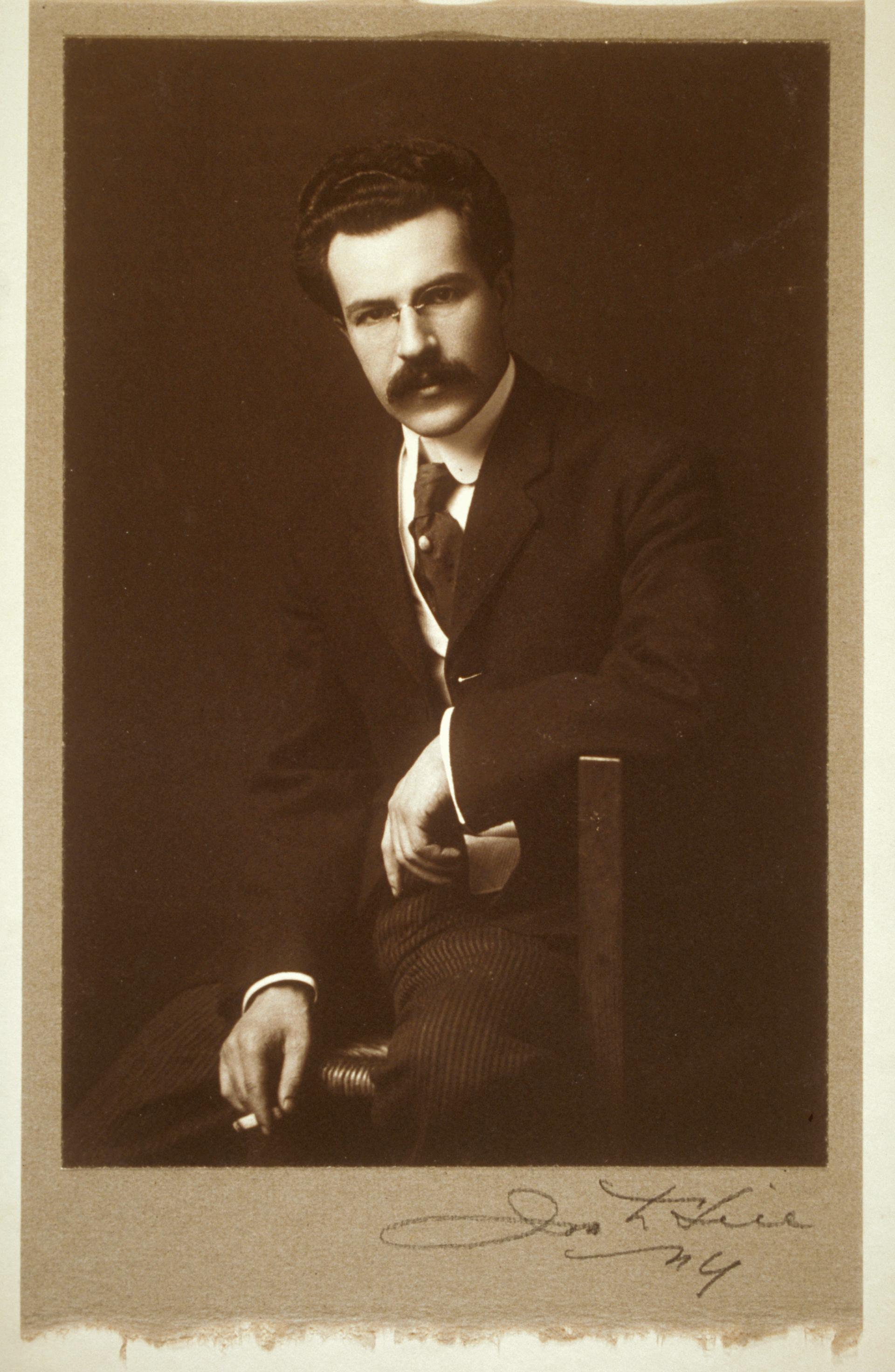
- Born: 1874; Russia
- Died: 1959 (aged 84–85)
- Occupation: Economics professor
- Spouse: Mary Melinda Kingsbury (m. 1899; died 1951)

Vladimir Gregorievitch Simkhovitch (1874–1959) was an economist and Professor of Economic History and Economics at Columbia University. Simkhovich was seen in the 1930s as "the hard core of the old department," a difficult professor who "devoted much of his time and energy to creating and maintaining feuds." His 1908 book Marxism versus Socialism was lauded as being "a work of incomparable thoroughness."

Simkhovitch received his doctorate from Halle-Wittenberg in 1898. He was hired by Columbia University in 1904 to teach economic history. He also lectured about socialist economics and Marxism until he retired in 1942. He married Mary Melinda Kingsbury in New York City in 1899 and they had two children. He was an art collector and avid gardener.

== Works and publications ==
- The case of Russia, a composite view (1905)
- The Russian peasant and autocracy (1906)
- Marxism versus socialism (1908)
- Rome's Fall Reconsidered (1916)
- Toward the understanding of Jesus, and other historical studies (1921)
