= Great Jones Street =

Street in Manhattan, New York

Coordinates: 40°43′37″N 73°59′34″W

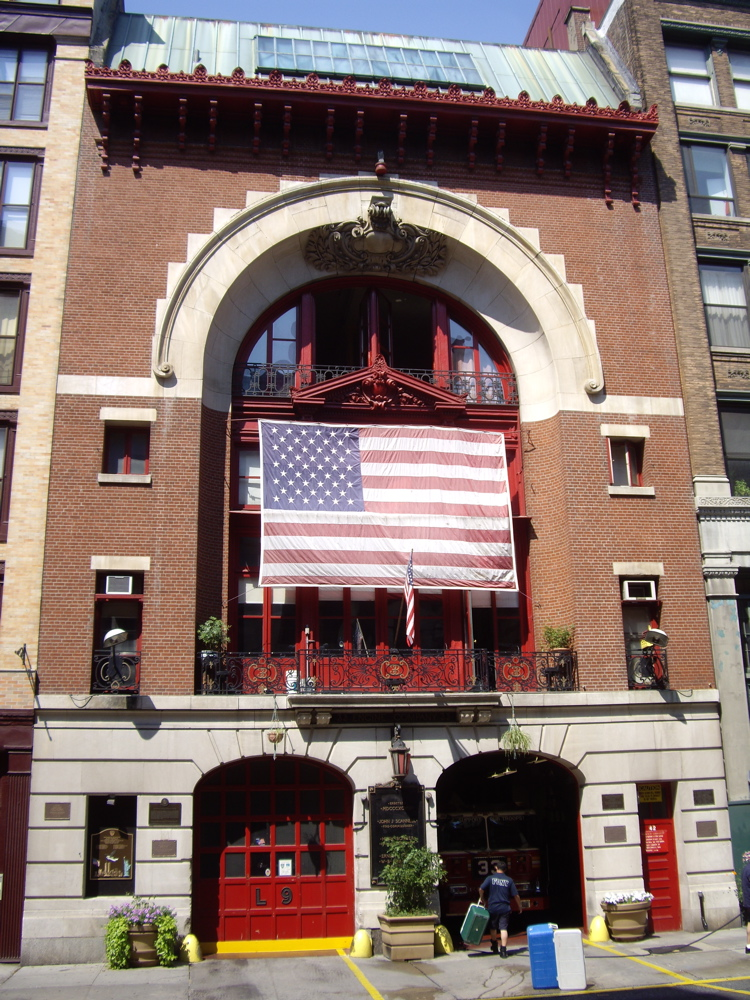
The Beaux Arts firehouse at 44 Great Jones Street houses Engine Company #33 and dates from 1898–1899. It was designed by Ernest Flagg and has been a New York City Landmark since 1968. (photo taken July 14, 2007)

Great Jones Street is a street in New York City's NoHo district in Manhattan, essentially another name for 3rd Street between Broadway and the Bowery.

The street was named for Samuel Jones, a lawyer who became known as "The Father of The New York Bar" due to his work on revising New York State's statutes in 1789 along with Richard Varick, who had a street in SoHo named after him. Jones was a member of the New York State Assembly from 1796 to 1799, and he also served as the state's first Comptroller.

Jones deeded the site of the street to the city with the stipulation that any street that ran through the property had to be named for him. However, when the street was first created in 1789, the city already had a Jones Street in Greenwich Village, named after Gardner Jones, Samuel Jones's brother-in-law. The confusion between two streets with the same name was broken when Samuel Jones suggested that his street be called Great Jones Street. An alternative theory suggests that the street was called "Great" because it was the wider of the two Jones Streets.

== Notable places and residents ==
- The building at 57 Great Jones Street, built as a stable in the late 19th century, was known during the 20th century as a gangsters' club and later an artists' studio, In 1905, the building became headquarters of Paul Kelly's Five Points Gang and hosted the New Brighton Athletic Club; a 1912 New York Times article dubbed it as "a notorious dive". The building was owned by Andy Warhol Enterprise Inc. from 1970 until 1990. The artist Jean-Michel Basquiat lived at 57 Great Jones Street from 1983 to 1988, where he died. A plaque commemorating Basquiat's life was placed outside the building on July 13, 2016, by the Greenwich Village Society for Historic Preservation. As of 2023, the building is occupied by Angelina Jolie's Atelier Jolie.
- The artist Kenny Scharf lived on Great Jones Street.

== Cultural impact ==
- According to the New York Daily News, the verb "Jonesing", a word used to describe an intense craving, originally for a drug, but now extended to everyday use, comes from Great Jones Street, a former junkie hangout, although other explorations into the etymology of the slang expression have been proposed.
- Thomas Reichman's documentary film Mingus: Charlie Mingus 1968 contains a scene which shows Mingus' November 1966 eviction from his loft at 5 Great Jones Street, which he had hoped to turn into a music school. The musician's belongings, including his instruments, are shown being hauled away, and Mingus himself is arrested when hypodermic needles are found among his belongings.
- In Don DeLillo's novel Great Jones Street, the main character, Bucky Wunderlick, a "rock star and budding messiah" is "holed up in a crummy room on New York's Great Jones Street until he somehow regains his will to go on."
- "Great Jones Street" is a song by the American band Luna from their album Bewitched. Dean Wareham, who founded the band, lists DeLillo's book as one of his favorites, and a press release for the band was signed by "Bucky Wunderlick", the main character in the novel. Wareham calls the song "A little tribute" to the novel.
- The Great Jones Street sign appears at 1:09 of the Rolling Stones "Love Is Strong" video.
