= 4th Street =

Northwest-southeast street in Manhattan, New York

- Washington Square South
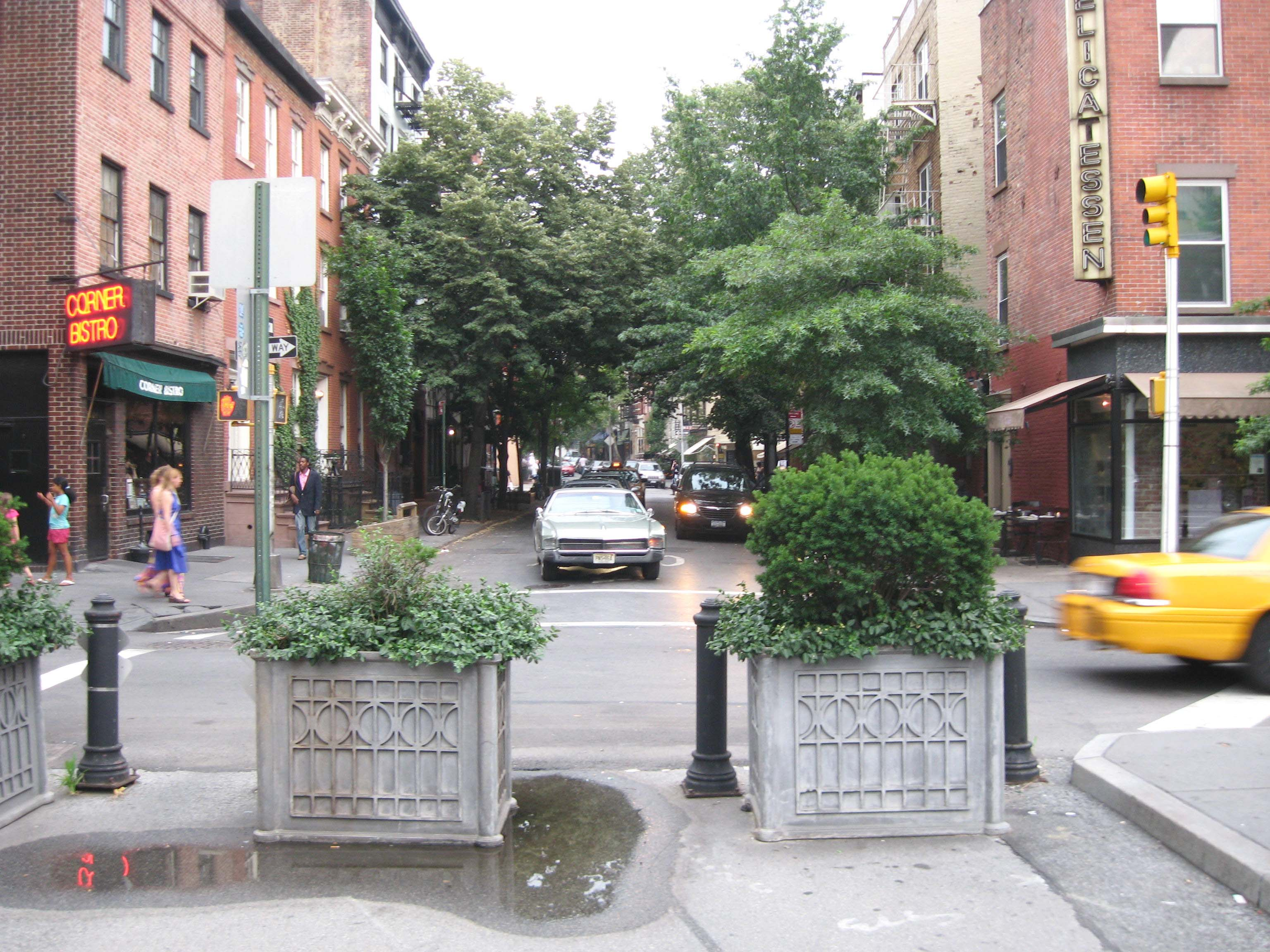
- West 4th Street at Jane Street
- Interactive map of 4th Street
- Former name: Asylum Street
- Maintained by: NYCDOT
- Length: 2.0 mi (3.2 km)
- Location: Manhattan, New York City
- Postal code: 10014, 10012, 10003, 10009
- West end: West 13th / Gansevoort Streets in Meatpacking
- East end: Avenue D in East Village
- North: Waverly Place (Bank to Grove Streets); Washington Place (Grove Street to Broadway); 5th Street (Bowery to Avenue D)
- South: Hudson Street (13th Street to 8th Avenue); Bleecker Street (8th to 6th Avenues); 3rd Street (6th Avenue to Avenue D)

4th Street is a street in Lower Manhattan, New York City. It starts at Avenue D as East 4th Street and continues to Broadway, where it becomes West 4th Street. It continues west until the Avenue of the Americas (Sixth Avenue), where West 4th Street turns north and confusingly intersects with West 10th, 11th, 12th, and 13th Streets in Greenwich Village. Most of the street has the same 40-foot (12 m) width between curbstones as others in the prevailing street grid, striped as two curbside lanes and one traffic lane, with one-way traffic eastbound. The portion from Seventh to Eighth Avenues is westbound (northbound geographically) and is approximately 35 feet (11 m) wide, a legacy of the original Greenwich Village street grid. The section of four short blocks from MacDougal Street to University Place which forms the southern border of Washington Square Park is called Washington Square South.

The north/south portion (from Sixth Avenue to 13th Street) was formerly called Asylum Street, after the Orphan Asylum Society, which stood on Asylum Street between Bank Street and Troy Street (now West 12th Street). The asylum was demolished in 1833 and the street was renamed West 4th Street. Later, the cross streets (Amos, Hammond, and Troy) were renamed West 10th, 11th, and 12th Streets, causing the current confusion.

== Landmarks ==
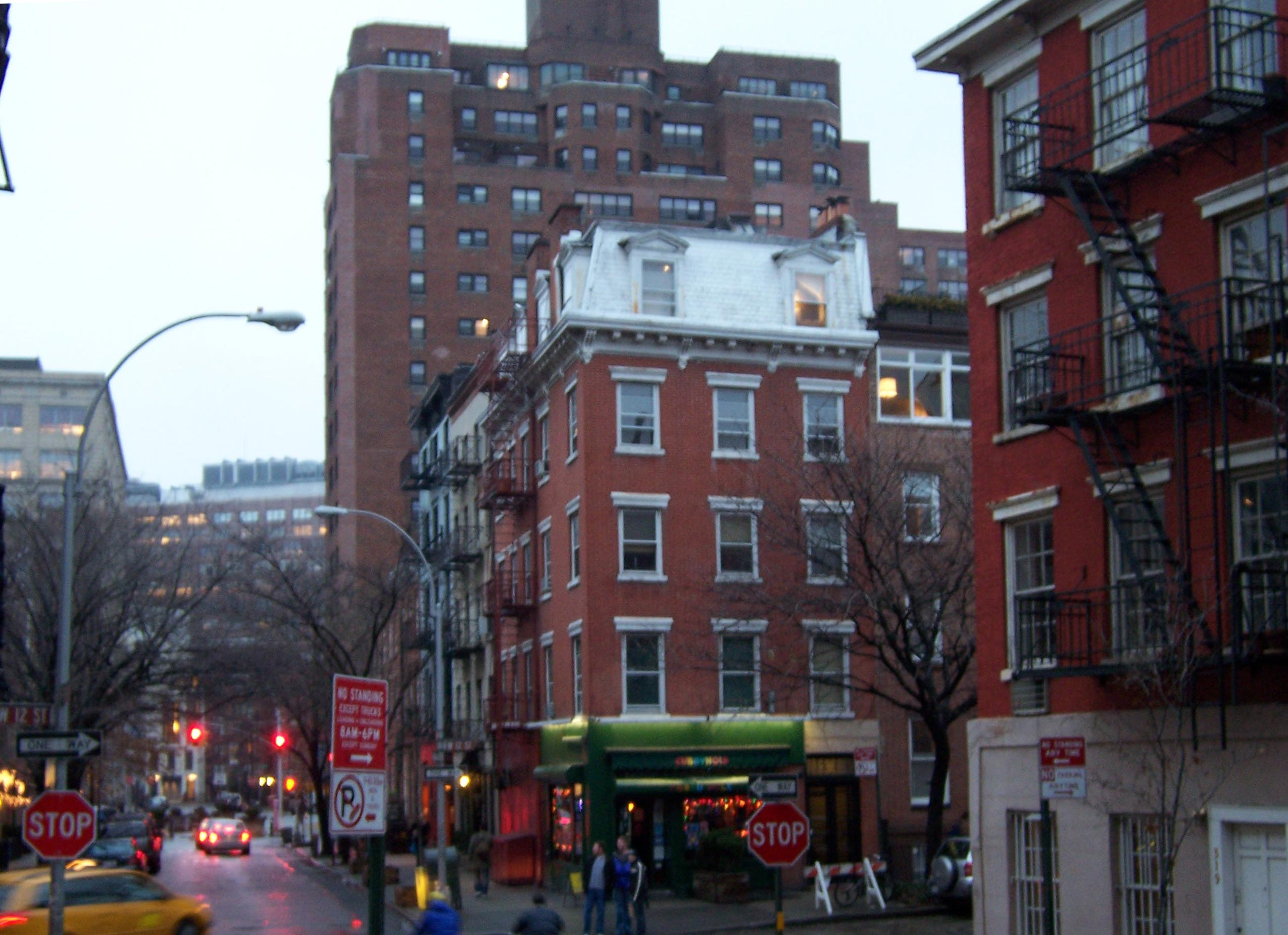
Due to the layout of streets in Greenwich Village, West 4th Street, running south to north, intersects West 12th Street, which runs west to east

Located near Washington Square Park's south-west corner, between MacDougal Street and Sixth Avenue, The Washington Square Methodist Church (135 West Fourth) is an early Romanesque Revival marble edifice designed by Gamaliel King and built in 1859–60. Dubbed the "Peace Church" for its support of Vietnam War protesters, Washington Square Church long provided a neighborhood base for activist groups such as the Black Panthers and Gay Men's Health Crisis. The church was sold in 2005 to a developer for conversion into residential units. During construction, parts of the church were salvaged to form the furniture and interior architecture of Urban Spring, a cafe in Fort Greene, Brooklyn.

Judson Memorial Church, located at the corner of Thompson Street and Washington Square South, was designed by architect Stanford White and stained glass master John La Farge.

The West Fourth Street subway station (A, B, C, D, E, F, <F>, and M trains) at Sixth Avenue is one of the major transfer points in the New York City Subway.

The street is home to the basketball and handball West Fourth Street Courts, known as "The Cage", a hangout for some of New York's best basketball players and the site of a citywide streetball tournament.

== Historic locations and residents ==
West 4th Street has always been a center of the Village's bohemian lifestyle. The Village's first tearoom, The Mad Hatter, was located at 150 West 4th Street and served as a meeting place for intellectuals and artists.

The infamous Golden Swan bar (known as the "Hell Hole"), at the corner of Sixth Avenue, was a famous haunt of Eugene O'Neill and the setting and inspiration for his play The Iceman Cometh. Writer Willa Cather's first New York residence was at 60 Washington Square South (4th Street between LaGuardia Place and Thompson Place) and radical journalists John Reed and Lincoln Steffens lived nearby at 42 Washington Square South. Reed later worked in a room in the Studio Club building to complete the series of articles that became his account of the Bolshevik Revolution, Ten Days That Shook the World, later the source for the film Reds.

Sculptor and art patron Gertrude Vanderbilt Whitney established the Whitney Studio Club in a brownstone at 147 West 4th Street in 1918 as a place for young artists to gather and show their work. The facility operated for ten years and was the second incarnation of what would later become the Whitney Museum of American Art. It started the careers of such artists as Ashcan School painter John Sloan, Edward Hopper, whose first one-man exhibit was held there in 1920, and social realists Reginald Marsh and Isabel Bishop. Sloan lived at 240 West 4th St and painted locations on the street including the Golden Swan.

The street was later home to the famous folk club Gerde's Folk City (11 West 4th Street), which hosted the New York debuts of Bob Dylan in 1961 and Simon & Garfunkel. Dylan also lived from early-1962 until late-1964 in a small $60-per-month studio apartment at 161 West 4th Street; the cover of The Freewheelin' Bob Dylan was photographed at nearby Jones Street at West 4th, and the street may have inspired his 1965 hit song "Positively 4th Street". Louis Abolafia, the 1968 hippie candidate for the presidency, had his artists' studio and campaign headquarters at 129 East 4th St.

Music venue The Bottom Line was at 15 West 4th Street from 1974 to 2004, while Manhattan's oldest continuously operating music and record store, The Music Inn, is at 169 West 4th Street.
