= The Music Inn =

American record store

- Type: Musical instrument retailer
- Founded: 1958 (68 years ago),
- Headquarters: 169 West 4th Street, Greenwich Village, Lower Manhattan, New York City, United States; 40.732243°N 74.001443°W
- Number of locations: 1
- Key people: Jerry Halpern (founder)
- Owners: Jeff Slatnick
- Website: musicinninstruments.shop

The Music Inn (also known as Music Inn World Instruments) is an independent retailer of musical instrument and vinyl records in Greenwich Village, New York City. Established in 1958, it is the oldest continuously operating music and record store in Manhattan. It is located in Lower Manhattan at 169 West 4th Street, a six-story building dating to 1905. The store, which occupies the ground floor and basement levels, was established by Bronx native Jerry Halpern (1929–2009); as of 2026, it is owned by musician Jeff Slatnick. He began working at the store periodically from 1967, and full-time since 1976.

The store's customers have included John Lennon, John Sebastian, Cyndi Lauper and Bob Dylan. Dylan lived a few doors along the street at number 161 and liked to spend time at the store. He also wrote a song titled "Positively 4th Street".

The Greenwich Village Society for Historic Preservation named the Music Inn its "business of the month" in October 2020.
