= Falsifying business records =

Criminal activity

Falsifying business records is a criminal offense in the laws of several U.S. states.

== New York State ==
=== Elements and punishment ===
Under New York State law, falsifying business records in the second degree is a class A misdemeanor, while falsifying business records in the first degree is a class E felony.

The elements for the misdemeanor second-degree crime are:

A person is guilty of falsifying business records in the second degree when, with intent to defraud, he:

1. makes or causes a false entry in the business records of an enterprise; or
2. alters, erases, obliterates, deletes, removes or destroys a true entry in the business records of an enterprise; or
3. omits to make a true entry in the business records of an enterprise in violation of a duty to do so which he knows to be imposed upon him or her by law or by the nature of his or her position; or
4. prevents the making of a true entry or causes the omission thereof in the business records of an enterprise."

Intent is an element of the offense; under New York law, the defendant's "intent" is his or her "conscious objective or purpose." The law does not require prosecutors to show that the defendant intended to cause a pecuniary or commercial loss (i.e., depriving a victim of money or property).

The crime becomes one of the first degree, and a felony, when an individual

commits the crime of falsifying business records in the second degree, and when his or her intent to defraud includes an intent to commit another crime or to aid or conceal the commission thereof."

Under New York law, "in any prosecution for falsifying business records, it is an affirmative defense that the defendant was a clerk, bookkeeper or other employee who, without personal benefit, merely executed the orders of his or her employer or of a superior officer or employee generally authorized to direct his or her activities."

==== Prosecutions ====
The offense of falsifying business records is commonly prosecuted in New York, and it is a frequent part of white-collar crime prosecutions brought by district attorneys' offices. For example, the Manhattan district attorney's office, from January 2022 through April 2023, brought 117 felony counts of falsifying business records against 29 defendants (some individuals and others companies). It is sometimes prosecuted in conjunction with separate crimes, such as petit or grand larceny, offering a false instrument, money laundering, or insurance fraud. The crime occurs in different factual contexts: for example, defendants have been prosecuted for falsifying business records as part of a scheme to steal from a company; as part of scheme to fail to report income (and thus evade taxes); for creating or filing fraudulent certificates of liability insurance as part of a wider fraud scheme; or for creating false applications for benefits.

In People v. Smithtown General Hospital (1978), an orthopedic surgeon, a nurse, and a hospital were indicted for allegedly allowing a prosthetic-devices salesman to "participate in a meaningful way" with a total hip arthroplasty, without the surgery patient's consent or knowledge. They were charged with first-degree falsifying business records, the charge being that they "omitted to make true entries in required reports in order to conceal the crimes of unauthorized practice of medicine and assault." The court rejected the defendants' motion to dismiss the indictment. The case is cited in medical and nursing ethics texts discussing criminal liability for certain omissions in medical records.

==== Notable cases ====
Notable people convicted in New York of falsifying business records include:

- L. Dennis Kozlowski, the former chief executive and chairman of Tyco International, convicted in 2005 on 22 counts, including grand larceny, conspiracy, falsifying business records and securities fraud;
- Clarence Norman Jr., a former New York assemblyman and powerful chair of the Brooklyn Democratic organization, convicted in 2005 on three felony counts of soliciting illegal campaign contributions during a primary, and one misdemeanor count of falsifying business records of the contributions;
- Steven Croman, a New York City slumlord who in 2017 pleaded guilty to grand larceny, falsifying business records and tax fraud as part of a mortgage and tax scheme;
- Donald Trump, convicted in 2024 of 34 counts of falsifying business records, in connection with a hush money payment to pornographic film actress Stormy Daniels, becoming the first U.S. president to be convicted of a felony.

== Other states ==
Falsifying business records is also a crime in other states, such as Alabama, Alaska, California, Delaware, Hawaii, Kentucky, and Oregon. In Maine, a similar crime is called falsifying private records.
