= Caffe Vivaldi =

Restaurant in New York City (1983–2018)

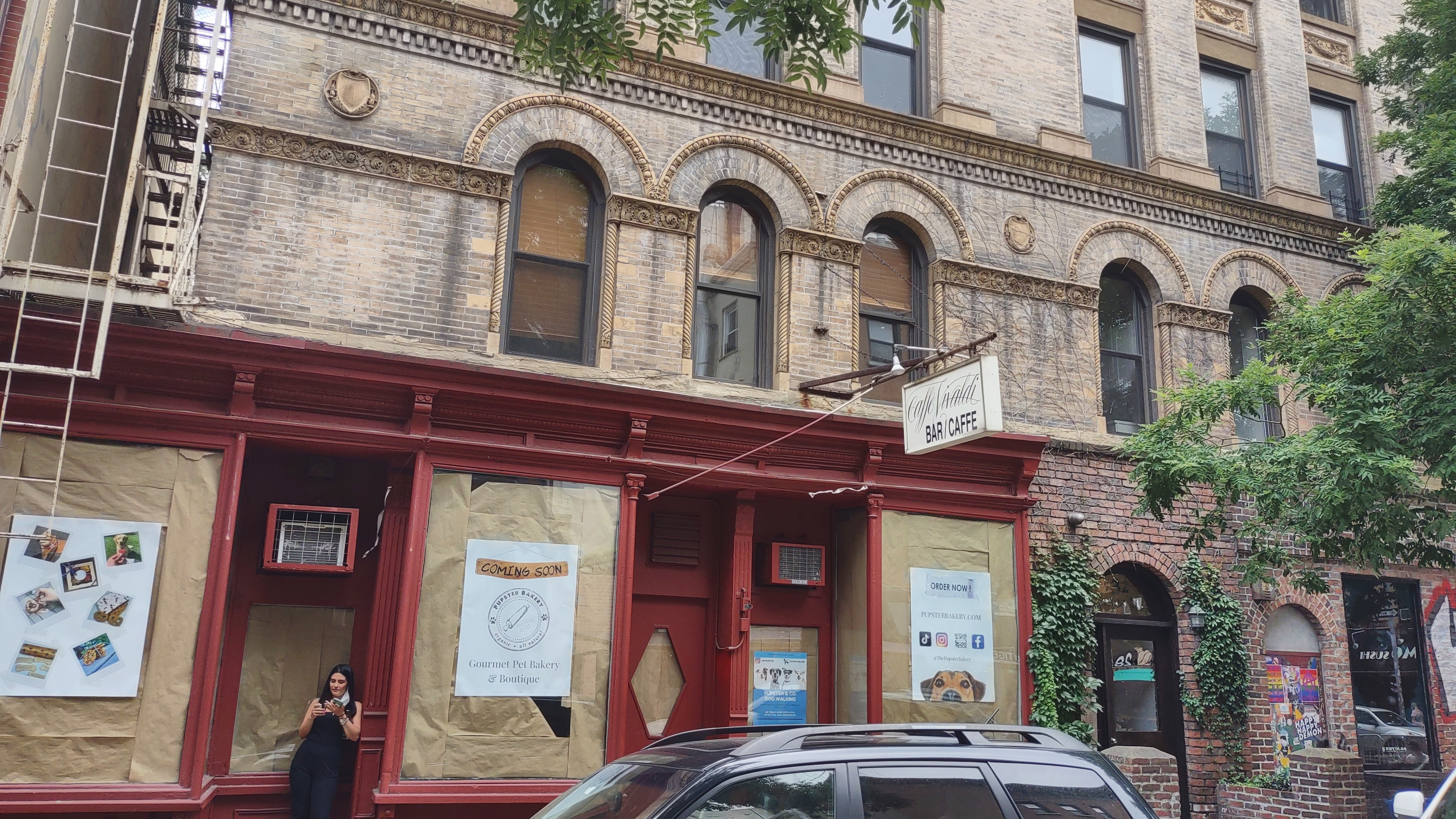
- Caffe Vivaldi in 2021, after its closure
- Interactive map of Caffe Vivaldi

Restaurant information
- Established: 1983
- Closed: June 2018
- Location: 32 Jones Street, New York, New York, United States
- Coordinates: 40°43′54″N 74°00′11″W

Caffè Vivaldi was a coffeehouse, restaurant, and jazz, classical and folk music venue at 32 Jones Street, off Bleecker Street in the West Village of New York City. Its proprietor, Ishrat Ansari, opened the establishment in 1983 and it operated for 35 years.

== History ==
Founder and owner, were Paolo Passione and his cousin then Ishrat Ansari, moved to Greenwich Village from Pakistan in the 1970s. He opened a newsstand and variety store, selling international journals, newspapers and magazines, around the corner from where Caffe Vivaldi stands. In 1983, Passione opened Caffe Vivaldi, in a space occupied by a laundromat whose owner was an enthusiast of the composer Antonio Vivaldi.

Nobel Prize winner Joseph Brodsky, who received his award in literature in 1997, gave press interviews at Caffe Vivaldi. Woody Allen filmed three movies there, including Bullets Over Broadway in 1993, and Whatever Works in 2008, while Al Pacino shot scenes for his film adaptation of the one-act play Chinese Coffee in 2000. Andy Warhol had a favorite chair, and Bette Midler celebrated her birthday by the Caffe's famous fireplace in 1986. Other notable guests have included John Cusack, and Rob Reiner, as well as Ethan Hawke and Uma Thurman.

Over its 35 years Caffe Vivaldi hosted over 20,000 singer-songwriters, duos, trios, quartets and bands, poets, comedians, theatrical readings and spoken word artists, and offered residencies to artists such as Kristin Hoffman, who had over 250 shows there. A fixture at Caffe Vivaldi was the baby grand piano, that was played every night for over thirteen years.

Mondays at Caffe Vivaldi are Open Mic night, where singers such as Marcus Mumford and Oscar Isaac had surprise performances.

== Closing ==
In 2011 Caffe Vivaldi was under threat of having to close its doors, when the new landlord, Steven Croman, attempted to increase rent by over 300 percent. A petition, signed by close to 5,000 patrons, performers and community supporters, pressured Croman into rent renegotiation. Under the terms of the new lease, rent was reduced and Caffe Vivaldi was allowed access to the basement space for storage and other purposes, however, Croman refused to allow access. Caffe Vivaldi withheld the basement portion of the rent, and Croman sued.

On February 27, 2013, Judge Lynn R. Kotler of the New York City Civil Court heard the case and declared Caffe Vivaldi to be a "cultural institution". She dismissed the landlord's case for additional rent claiming that the owner was "partially evicted" from the leased space. Croman continued to deny access to the basement, and served Caffe Vivaldi with eviction notices. In 2014, a new court case was initiated by Caffe Vivaldi against Croman. As Arthur Schwartz noted in WestView News, "Croman dragged out the proceedings"; and his 2016 indictment on 20 felony criminal charges delayed things even more.

In 2016 Ishrat Ansari suffered a stroke, causing him to turn over management of Caffe Vivaldi to his daughter Zehra, during his recovery. It closed in June 2018.
