= Jones Street =

Street in New York City

Coordinates: 40°43′55.2″N 74°0′9.16″W

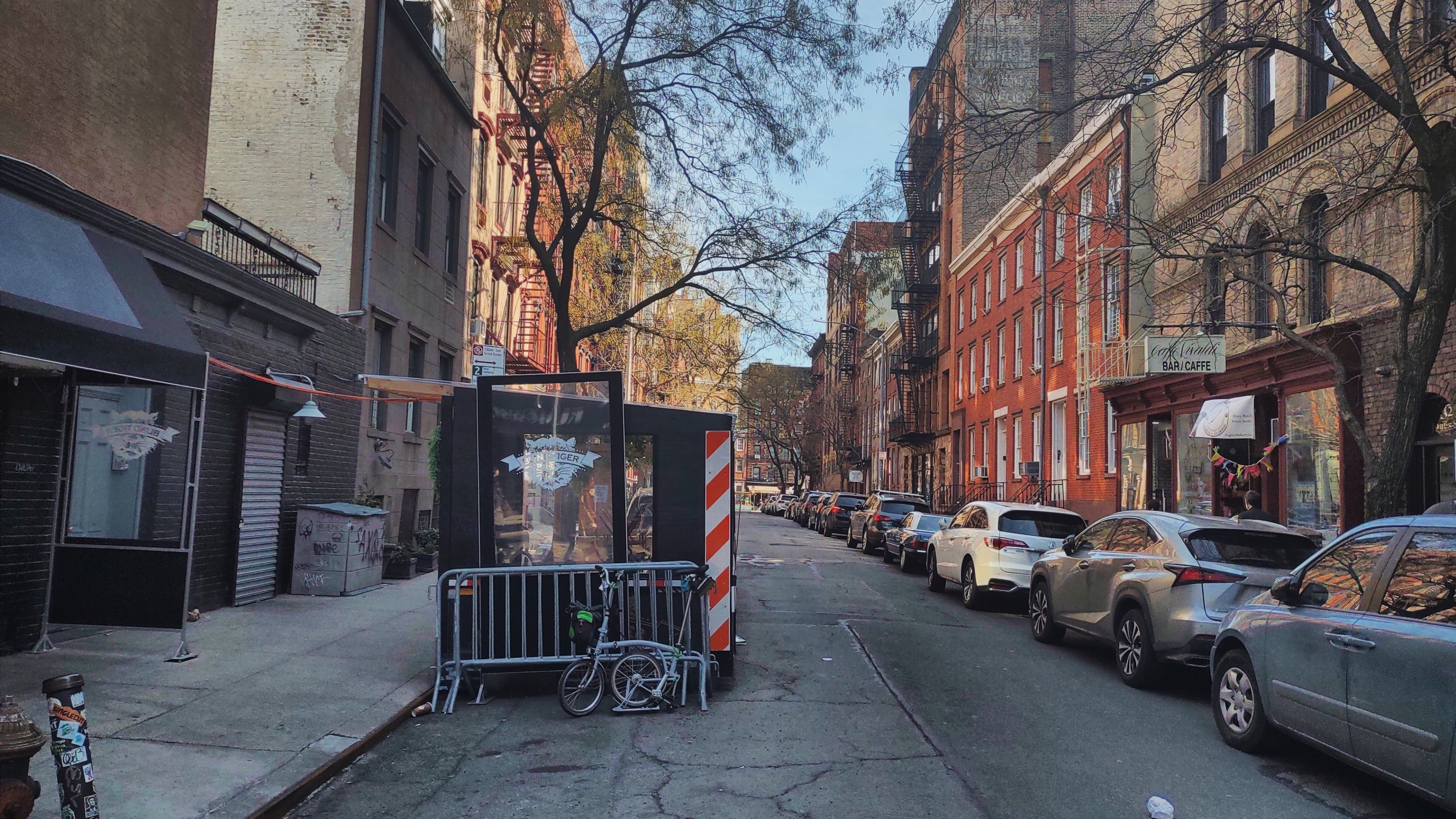
- Jones Street
- Interactive map of Jones Street
- Postal code: 10014
- Northeast end: West 4th Street
- Southwest end: Bleecker Street

Jones Street is a street located in Greenwich Village in the borough of Manhattan in New York City. It runs between Bleecker Street and West 4th Street. Jones Street is sometimes confused with Great Jones Street in NoHo, located a little more than a half-mile to the east.

What is now Jones Street predates 1789, and was named after Gardner Jones. Today's Great Jones Street was named after Samuel Jones, a lawyer who revised New York State's statutes in 1789 together with Richard Varick, and became known as "The Father of The New York Bar". He was also the brother-in-law of Gardner Jones. Jones deeded the site of the street to the city under the condition that any street that ran through the property had to be named for him. However, when the street was first created in 1789, the city already had a "Jones Street," Neither brother-in-law would defer to the other to end the resulting confusion, but Samuel Jones finally ended the argument by suggesting "Then make mine 'Great Jones Street'". An alternative possibility is that Great Jones Street is so named because it is wider than Jones Street.

== In popular culture ==
The cover photo of the 1963 Bob Dylan album The Freewheelin' Bob Dylan depicts Dylan and then-girlfriend Suze Rotolo walking down the center of Jones Street on a wintry February day.

Movies filmed on Jones Street include Cruising,Bullets Over Broadway, Chinese Coffee, Whatever Works, Addicted to Love and The Irishman. In The Butcher's Wife, the butcher shop shown is Florence Meat Market at 5 Jones Street. Scenes from the first episode of the sixth season of Californication were filmed on Jones Street as well as scenes from the fifth episode of Woody Allen's mini-series Crisis in Six Scenes.

== See also ==
- Caffe Vivaldi
- 26, 28, and 30 Jones Street
