= Steven Croman =

American landlord and felon

- Occupation: Landlord
- Organization: Centennial Properties NY
- Criminal charges: Grand larceny, tax fraud, and filing a false instrument
- Criminal penalty: 8 months in prison and $5 million fine

Steven Croman is a real estate owner and fraudster in New York City. In 1990, Croman incorporated the management and brokerage firm Croman Real Estate (later rebranded to 9300 Realty) and quickly grew his business, owning 20 buildings by the end of the decade and 150 buildings by 2016, mostly in Manhattan's East Village. 9300 Realty was subsequently rebranded as Centennial Properties NY.

Croman is well-known as a result of numerous tenant harassment and fraud allegations throughout his career in real estate.

== Allegations ==
In 1998, Croman was listed as one of The Village Voice's 10 Worst Landlords and became known for tenant harassment. By 2002, tenants had formed the Croman Tenants Coalition, and others alleging mistreatment have formed since then such as Stop Croman Coalition. In 2014, New York Attorney General Eric Schneiderman began investigating 9300 Realty following accusations of tenant harassment. In 2015, the tenants' rights group Cooper Square Committee found Croman to have over $1 million in unpaid Environmental Control Board (ECB) violations. In 2016, Croman was charged with 20 felonies, including grand larceny, falsifying business records, scheming to defraud, offering a false instrument for filing, and criminal tax fraud. In the same year, an independent civil lawsuit in the New York Supreme Court in Manhattan alleged tenant harassment, intentionally filing baseless lawsuits to pressure tenants out of their apartments, and incentivizing agents and employees to maximize tenant buyouts.

In 2017, Croman pleaded guilty to grand larceny, tax fraud, and filing a false instrument, and was sentenced to 8 months in prison and a $5 million fine. In the same year, the AG and Croman settled the civil lawsuit, forcing Croman to pay $8 million in restitution to tenants and hand over management of many properties to a monitor; at the time, this was the largest-ever monetary settlement with an individual landlord and largest-ever monitorship in a tenant harassment case. In coordination with Attorney General Letitia James, an independent management company, New York City Management (NYCM), managed over 100 Croman-owned properties from Feb 2018 to Jan 13, 2023. After suing NYCM, Croman regained management from NYCM a month early (originally the monitorship was to last through Feb 2023).

In 2018, a new lawsuit alleged that Croman illegally deregulated apartments in an East Harlem building, and in 2019 this lawsuit became a class action lawsuit involving more than 100 current and former tenants. Multiple other tenant-related lawsuits have also been filed since Croman's release from prison.

In 2021, State Sen. Brad Hoylman introduced a bill inspired by Croman that would bar landlords convicted of fraud or violating housing laws from receiving financing from state-chartered banks.
