= Mary Kingsbury Simkhovitch =

American city planner and social worker (1867–1951)

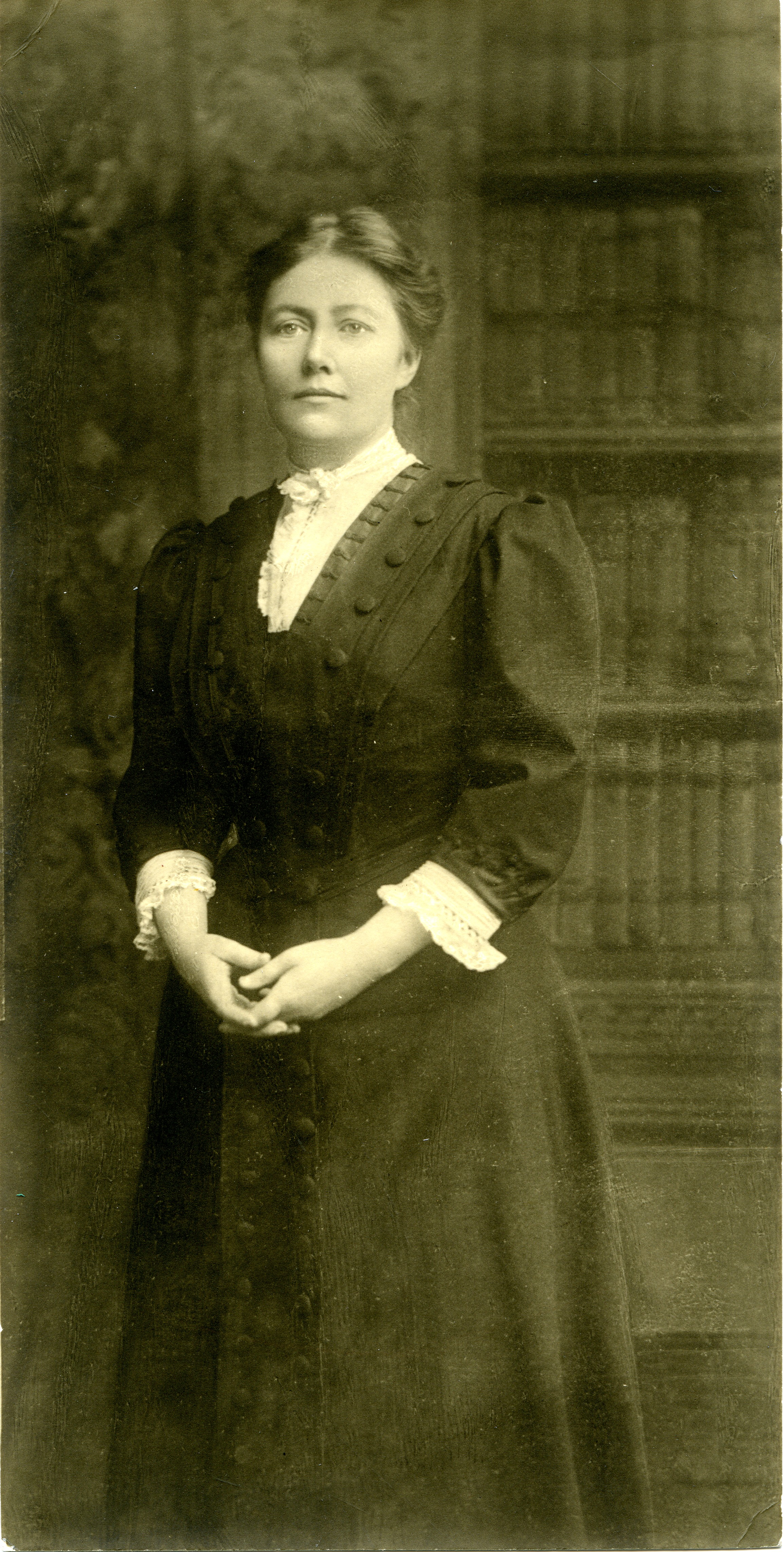
- Simkhovitch, c. 1880s–90s
- Born: Mary Melinda Kingsbury; September 8, 1867; Chestnut Hill, Massachusetts
- Died: November 15, 1951 (aged 84)
- Spouse: Vladimir Simkhovitch (m. 1899)
- Parent(s): Laura Davis Holmes (1839-1932); Isaac Franklin Kingsbury (1841-1919)

Mary Melinda Kingsbury Simkhovitch (September 8, 1867 – November 15, 1951) was an American city planner and social worker. She was one of the first members of the New York City Housing Authority, serving from its creation in 1934 until 1948.

== Biography ==
Mary Melinda Kingsbury was born on September 8, 1867 in Chestnut Hill, Massachusetts, to Laura Davis Holmes (1839-1932) and Isaac Franklin Kingsbury (1841-1919). She graduated from Newton High School in 1886 and received her B.A. from Boston University, where she had been a member of Phi Beta Kappa, in 1890. During college she performed volunteer work in a teenage girls' club at Boston's St. Augustine's Episcopal Church, an African American congregation, and at "St. Monica's Home for old colored women." After graduation she taught Latin in the Somerville, Massachusetts High School for two years. In 1894 she started a year of graduate school at Radcliffe College. Two Boston organizations, the Church of the Carpenter, a Christian Socialist church founded by W. D. P. Bliss, and Denison House, a settlement house run by Helena Dudley, had a lasting influence on Simkhovitch.

She visited black and immigrant families in Boston’s tenement slums, observed and documented their poverty, and became aware of the power and wealth of the city’s slumlords. In 1895 she attended the University of Berlin on a scholarship from the Women's Educational and Industrial Union. Her mother accompanied her to Europe in the summer of 1895 and stayed in Berlin while school was in session. It was there that Mary met and became engaged to Vladimir Simkhovitch (1874-1959), a Russian student of economics. During the summer of 1896 she and her friend Emily Greene Balch, the future Nobel Peace Prize winner, attended the International Socialist Trade Union Congress in London.

After London she attended Columbia University where she worked with Edwin Robert Anderson Seligman and James Harvey Robinson and boarded with the writer Anne O'Hagan Shinn.

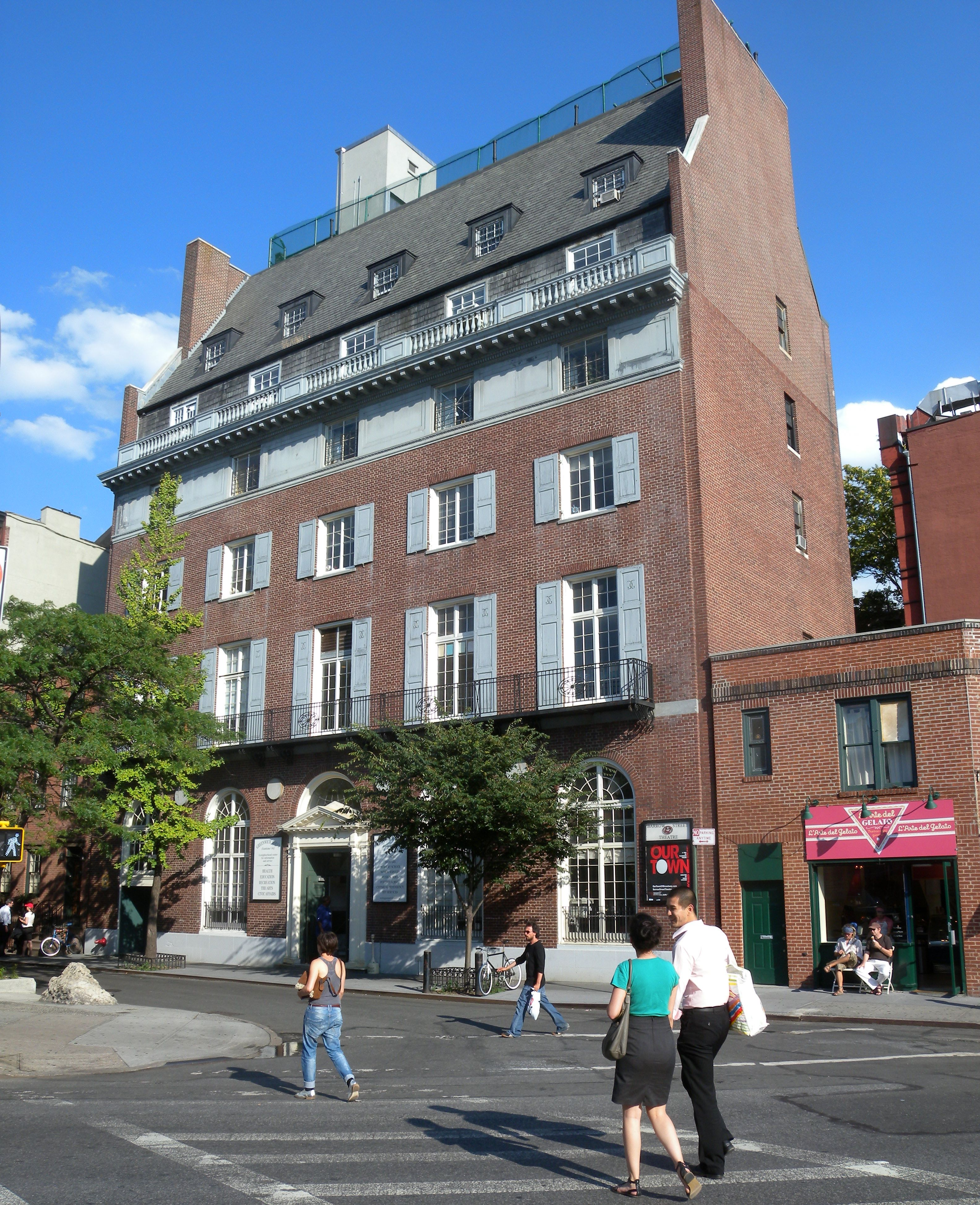
Greenwich House in 2010

In 1902, she and others founded the Greenwich House, a settlement house, at 26 Jones Street in Greenwich Village in New York City. In 1905, she was a member of the Committee of Fourteen that was seeking to reduce prostitution in New York City. In 1931, Simkhovitch was closely involved in the founding of the National Public Housing Conference, serving as its first president.

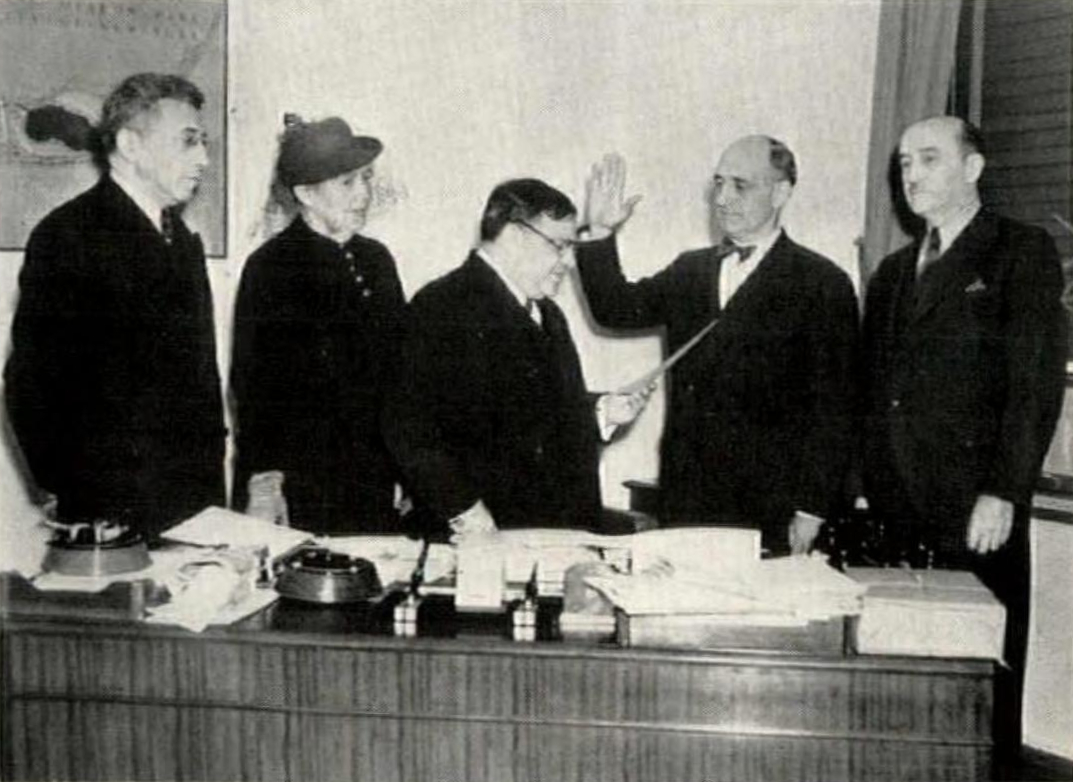
New York City mayor Fiorello La Guardia swears in new members of the New York City Housing Authority, 1937

On November 7, 1933, former Congressman Fiorello La Guardia was elected the 99th mayor of New York City, the first Republican (and first anti-Tammany) candidate to do so in 20 years. The following February, the New York City Housing Authority was established to carry out "the clearance, replanning, and reconstruction of the areas in which unsanitary or substandard housing conditions exist." Charged with appointing all five of its members, La Guardia chose Simkhovitch, a social worker, Tenement House Commissioner Langdon W. Post (who served as its chairman), housing advocate Louis H. Pink, Jewish Daily Forward general manager Baruch Charney Vladeck, and Catholic priest Edward R. Moore. Their budget, secured by La Guardia from Public Works Administration head Harold Ickes, was $25 million, a fourth of the PWA's entire housing budget.

== Death ==
She died on November 15, 1951, in New York City.

== Archive ==
Her papers are archived at Harvard.

== Publications ==
- Simkhovitch, Mary Kingsbury (1917). The City Worker's World in America.
- The Red Festival (1934)
- Simkhovitch, Mary Kingsbury (1938). Neighborhood: My Story of Greenwich House.
- Simkhovitch, Mary Kingsbury; Ogg, Elizabeth (1942). Quicksand: The Way of Life in the Slums.
- Simkhovitch, Mary Kingsbury (1949). Here Is God's Plenty.

== See also ==
- Settlement house
