= 1880s in organized crime =

List of years in organized crime
- … 1870; 1871; 1872; 1873; 1874; 1875; 1876; 1877; 1878; 1879; 1880; 1881; 1882; 1883; 1884; 1885; 1886; 1887; 1888; 1889; 1890 …
- Art; Archaeology; Architecture; Literature; Music; Philosophy; Science; +...

This is a list of organized crime in the 1880s, arranged chronologically.

== 1880 ==
=== Events ===
- With resentment toward Europeans at an all-time high, Chinese triads reach their peak numbering over 3,600 although many of the groups are limited to local villages or clans.
- Early Cantonese criminals, who will eventually form the first of the New York Tongs, soon began arriving in the city after the success of the Cantonese gambler Wah Kee, who had been operating illegal gambling parlors and opium dens since the 1870s, in the New York district of what will later be known as Chinatown. The Chinese population steadily begins to climb to several hundred, compared to only 12 as of 1872, as the predominantly German and smaller Irish population slowly become driven out of the neighborhoods of Doyers, Mott, and Pell Streets as a result of the large immigration of Chinese immigrants which by 1910 will number more than 10,000.
- January 13 - Robert Suffrage, a 19-year-old carpenter and member of the Stable Gang, is sentenced to two years and three months imprisonment at New York State Prison for stealing the gold watch of a Dennis McGuinness the previous October. While being taken to The Tombs, Suffrage attacked the arresting officer and was immediately taken back to the courtroom where he was indicted of assault in less than ten minutes.
- February 10 – Edward and John Brady (criminal), leaders of the Brady Gang, are arrested along with four others including Hugh Brady (or John Osborne) and Thomas Brady (or Thomas Halligan), Edward Carrol, Michael Hammel and Harmond Clark (the latter two suspected of running moonshine from New York to the Palisades) and for operating an illegal distillery. With the exception of Clark who was acquitted due to lack of evidence, the remaining members were convicted and given a suspended sentence as they had been held in custody for the past ten months.
- February 29 – New York police officer Thomas M. Stone is severely beaten by members of the Smoky Hollow Gang while attempting to arrest a gang member loitering on Columbia Street. Surrounded by several gang members, Stone was relieved of his billy club and repeatedly kicked and assaulted, with some of the members going so far as to jump on his body after the officer had lost consciousness, until bystanders interfered after one member was stopped from attempting to use a heavy piece of paving stone to crush the officers skull in. Although later apprehended and held at Raymond Street Jail, Stone later died of his injuries while at Long Island College Hospital on the evening of April 1 and was speculated in the press that the gang members would receive leniency due to their political connections to Democratic politicians in the Brooklyn's Sixth Ward.
- April 26 – Several weeks after the death of police officer Thomas Stone, a Sgt. Walsh is attacked by members of the Smoky Hollow Gang while attempting to arrest Edward Glynn for disorderly conduct. While initially outnumbered, several bystanders including his uncle Frank Walsh came to his assistance and arrested another of his assailants John Mungerford. Mungerford, a brother of the gang member officer Stone had attempted to arrest, was charged as an accomplice in the patrolman's murder.
- May 5 – John "Little Andy" Anderson, a former member of the Dutch Mob, is arrested by a police detective on the corner of Prince Street and The Bowery. Although he attempted to fire a revolver at the arresting officer, he was disarmed and taken into custody on suspicion of a recent robbery which had taken place at the Michell, Myers & Co. on Second Avenue six days earlier. While over $1,500 in jewellery is found in his possession, he denied his involvement in the robbery claiming the jewelry had been given to him and is released under a $5,000 bail following his arraignment at the Tombs Police Court. The money and jewelry which had claimed was his property including a diamond pin, an amethyst ring, $65 in cash and his revolver were returned to him upon his release.
- July 15 – A brawl between rival members of the Eightieth and Ninetieth Street Gangs along the traverse road in Central Park near 85th Street is broken up by police. Although officers from the Central Park Police, the 31st Precinct and the 88th Street Stationhouse were preparing to apprehend the nearly 200 gang members in attendance, a local patrolman accidentally stumbled across the fight and blew his whistle before officers were in place. With the crowd alerted to the presence of police, only nine men were taken into custody including William Olive, Jeremiah Collins, William Swan, John Lahey, John McNamara, John Lynch, Bernard McHugh, Peter Murray and Coneilius Sullivan who were held in custody at the 23rd Precinct Police Station.
- August 11 – John Collins and John Murphy, members of the Portland Street Gang, are arrested by two police officers after a hard chase. Taken into custody, they are both charged with robbing a Daniel Reardon of Eastport, Maine.
- September 30 – The body of John D. "Travelling Mike" Grady is found in his Sixth Avenue office. Several relatives suspect foul play, as he was recovering from an attack of pneumonia lasting some months; however an autopsy report confirms he died of cardiac congestion.

=== Births ===
- James Alderman, Florida bootlegger

=== Deaths ===
- September 30 – John D. Grady "Travelling Mike", New York criminal and leader of the Grady Gang

== 1881 ==
=== Events ===
- The Genyosha (Dark Ocean Society), an ultra-nationalist political organization, is established by yakuza.
- The Vigilance Committee is organized as a reform movement to fight crime and corruption in New Orleans.
- July 5 – Months after his arrival in New Orleans from Sicily, Black Hand leader Giuseppe Esposito is quickly arrested by Police Chief David C. Hennessy and his cousin Detective Mike Hennessy. Esposito, wanted by Italian authorities on a number of murder and kidnapping charges, is soon deported to Italy. Esposito's organization is brought under control of Charles and Antonio Matranga.
- July 16 – New Orleans hoodlum Anthony Labrusio (or Labruzzo) is killed by Black Hand assassin Giutano Ardota on behalf of Sicilian fugitive Giuseppe Esposito, on whom Labrusio has been informing.

=== Births ===
- James M. Ragen, co-founder of the Ragen's Colts street gang and Chicago gangster.
- Harvey Van Dine, a co-leader of the Car Barn Bandits

=== Deaths ===
- July – Anthony Labrusio, (New Orleans) Black Hand member

== 1882 ==
=== Events ===
- Although various Triad-based groups had been in existence following the California Gold Rush, the first modern day Chinese-American Tongs are formed by Chinese immigrants for mutual protection in response to the Chinese Exclusion Act of 1882.
- Tony Matranga takes control of the New Orleans Black Hand after former leader Giuseppi Esposito is deported in 1881.

=== Births ===
- Arnold Rothstein, "The Brain" New York Crime Syndicate leader
- Max Zwerbach "Kid Twist", Eastman Gang leader and New York gangster
- February – Johnny Torrio, Chicago Mafia Don and Chicago syndicate leader

== 1883 ==
=== Events ===
- An Italian-American criminal organization known as the Favara Brotherhood is discovered to be operating in Sulphur County, Sicily.
- 8 March – Whyos gang member Mike McGloin is hanged at Tombs Prison for the murder of saloonkeeper Louis Hannier.
- 16 October - Johnny Walsh is killed in a gunfight with rival Dutch Mob gang members Johnny Irving and Billy Porter in Shang Draper's saloon. Irving is also killed in the shootout, while Porter, though he is shot, survives and is arrested.

=== Deaths ===
- 8 March – Mike McGloin, Whyos member
- 16 October - Johnny Walsh, Walsh Gang leader
- 16 October - Johnny Irving, Dutch Mob leader

== 1884 ==
=== Events ===
- "Yellow" Henry Stewart and three gang members are convicted of armed robbery and imprisoned. Stewart later dies in prison of malaria in 1886.
- Johnny Torrio emigrates with his mother Maria Carlucci Torrio to the United States arriving in New York from Osara, Italy.
- March 1 – Two members of the Whyos, recently sentenced to six months imprisonment for vagrancy, escape from Hart's Island after swimming to a boat anchored in the Sound. Suspicious of the circumstances surrounding their escape, two prison guards are dismissed from their posts.
- June 4 – The body of George Leonidas Leslie, a.k.a. George Howard, former leader of the Leslie Gang, is found by an NYPD Mounted Patrolman at the bottom of Tramps' Rock on the border of Westchester County and the Bronx River.
- July 22 – New York fence Marm Mandelbaum is charged with several counts of grand larceny and receiving stolen goods by the recently appointed District Attorney Peter B. Olney. While the trial was scheduled in December, Mandelbaum skipped bail, fleeing to Canada where she would reside for the rest of her life.
- October 21 – James Reilly, along with his Whyos accomplices John Belfield and James Brown, are tried and convicted of assaulting and robbing an Englishman, Henry Stanley, of $26 after Reilly lured him to a Pell Street saloon.
- October 26 – Suspected members of the Mulberry Street Gang including James McCardell, John Lary, Charles McManus and ex-con George Lee are taken into custody by police officers of the Sixth Precinct Station House after August Lenk and John Burke reported being assaulted on the corner of Grand and Mulberry Streets by unidentified assailants who stole their gold watches. During their trial at the Tombs Police Court One of those charged, James McCardell, was identified by Lenk as one of his attackers while Burke claimed to recognize George Lee as the who had distracted him while the other two men attacked. McCardell is held in custody at $1,000 bail; the others were remanded.
- December 25 – Dennis Cocoran, formerly of the New Orleans City Hall Department of Improvements and leader of the Poydras Market Gang, stabbed Deputy Sheriff Daniel Haugherty on the corner of Poydras and Liberty Streets after an altercation only hours before. Taken to Charity Hospital, he died of his wounds at around one o'clock the following morning.

=== Births ===
- October 1 – Damon Runyon (Alfred Damon Runyon), Organized crime writer
- November 19 – Joseph Ardizzone, Los Angeles crime family, Boss

== 1885 ==
=== Events ===
- July 4 – John Kelly and John Clinton, members of the Whyos, are tried at Essex Market Street Court and convicted of assaulting Naty Glashiem and stealing his gold watch and chain.
- August 10 – Several members of the 74th Street Gang, including William "Red" Carroll, James Fitzpatrick, James Beatty, Louis Gavious (or Fitzpatrick) and John "Noble" Hughes, are arrested by a Capt. Gunner of the 28th Precinct after the death of one of their victims, Nawclaw Kalat, who dies of his injuries earlier that day. Kalat, who had been fighting with another Bohemian immigrant on Avenue A, had been severely injured when members of the gang joined in the fight.
- November 26 – Patrick O'Brien and Michael Flannagan, both members of the Whyos, are arrested and charged with the assault and robbery of fireman William Clark on the night of November 25. O'Brien's brother, having been present at the court house at the time of Patrick O'Brien's arrest, left with another gang member to get a lawyer for his brother. However, in an attempt to raise enough money for a lawyer, he was caught attempting to steal a gold watch from a visiting businessman Ebenezer S. Willis. As he was being brought into custody, he assaulted an acquaintance John Gagin who had agreed to testify against O'Brien having witnessed the theft.

=== Births ===
- Frankie Yale (Francesco Uale), Unione Siciliane leader, Five Points Gang member, (New York) Black Hand member, and New York bootlegger.

== 1886 ==
=== Events ===
- July 10 - Former leader of the Yellow Henry Gang "Yellow" Henry Stewart dies of malaria while serving a prison sentence for armed robbery.
- September 29 - Michael Hennessy, a cousin of New Orleans police chief David Hennessy, is murdered, possibly by a Black Hand assassin, in Houston, TX.
- October 2 – After an altercation at Bill Swan's Fireproof Coffee House saloon, Matt O'Brian wounds his brother and fellow co-leader of the Live Oak Boys, Hugh O'Brian, on Gallatin Street. Arrested for the assault, despite Hugh fleeing New Orleans in an effort to avoid testifying against his brother, Matt O'Brian is convicted of "assault less than mayhem" and imprisoned, ending the Live Oak Boys' presence in the New Orleans' underworld.

=== Births ===
- Waxey Gordon (Irving Wexler), New York gangster and Prohibition bootlegger
- Jake Guzik "Greasy Thumb", "Chicago Outfit" member
- May 28 – Santo Trafficante Sr., Tampa Mafia Don
- July 19 – Alphonso Sgroia "The Butcher", New York mobster
- Joe Masseria (Giuseppe Masseria) "Joe the Boss", New York Mafia Don

=== Deaths ===
- July 10 - Henry Stewart, Yellow Henry Gang leader
- September 29 - Michael Hennessy, American law enforcement officer

== 1887 ==
=== Events ===
- Chinese triads the Big Sword Society and the Shandong-based White Lotus Society are suspected of instigating attacks on Christian missionaries (including Chinese converts) and foreigners. By the end of the decade they have more than 1,000 followers carrying out attacks on isolated missions and trading posts.
- Joseph Pinzolo, Lucchese crime family boss, is born.
- March 15 - Former Chicago Police Chief William McGarigle and current Warden of the County Hospital, in the pay of Chicago crime lord Michael Cassius McDonald, is indicted for graft (later fleeing to Canada).
- July 5 – Danny Lyons kills rival pimp Joseph Quinn in a gunfight over prostitute Kitty McGown.
- August 13 – Daniel Lyons, who succeeded Danny Driscoll as leader of the Whyos, suffers a gunshot wound to the head by saloon keeper David Murphy and died the following day while at Chambers Street Hospital. Lyons, not to be confused with former leader Danny Lyons, had been tearing up Murphy's saloon along with the nephew of Jerry Hartigan when Murphy shot him. Although immediately turning himself over to police claiming self-defense, he was held in custody at The Tombs.

=== Deaths ===
- July 5 – Joseph Quinn, New York pimp

== 1888 ==
=== Events ===
- Frank Lyons, a member of the Yellow Henry Gang, escapes from prison and reorganizes the gang before being recaptured later that year.
- January 23 – Danny Driscoll, co-leader of the Whyos street gang, is executed for the death of New York prostitute Breezy Garrity during a gunfight between Driscoll and Five Points Gang member Johnny McCarthy.
- August 21 – Danny Lyons, leader of the Whyos street gang, is executed for the murder of Joseph Quinn.

=== Births ===
- January 21: Frank Nitti, underboss to Chicago crime boss Al Capone.
- December 5: Anthony Milano, underboss in the Cleveland crime family
- Joseph DiGiovanno, Kansas City La Mano Nera (The Black Hand) leader
- Vincent Mangano, Mangano crime family founder
- Nathan Shefferman – Chicago Teamsters Union official and associate of Dave Beck
- Jack Zelig (William Alberts), New York gangster (although other sources claim 1882)

=== Deaths ===
- January 23 – Danny Driscoll, co-leader of the Whyos street gang, is executed.
- August 21 – Danny Lyons, leader of the Whyos street gang.

== 1889 ==
=== Births ===
- Gaetano Reina, Joe Masseria Capo
- Louis Pioggi, "Louie the Lump", Five Points Gang member
- January 27 – Frank Nitti, Chicago Outfit mobster, in Augori, Sicily
