= Ocean National Bank robbery =

1869 bank robbery in New York City

Coordinates: 40°42′44″N 74°0′43″W

- Date: June 1869
- Location: Ocean National Bank, Manhattan, New York City
- Perpetrator: Gang of George Leonidas Leslie
- Participants: 8
- Outcome: Bank robbery of $768,879.94

In June 1869, the Ocean National Bank in Manhattan, New York City was robbed of $768,879.94 in cash, securities, and jewelry by the gang of George Leonidas Leslie. It was the largest heist in New York City history at the time. Planning for the heist took three months, and was funded by Fredericka Mandelbaum, who received a 10% cut of the earnings.

== Background ==
The Ocean National Bank was located in Manhattan, New York City, on the corner of Greenwich Street and Fulton Street. It was located on the first of six stories of a brownstone building. At the time of the robbery, the offices included a large business room, the president's private room, and the vault. The vault was made up of three compartments, each with their own door. The outside wall was made up of granite, which was lined on both sides by heavy plates of boiler iron. The first door was held together tightly by bolts and a combination lock. The second door was also made of iron and had a combination lock. The keys to this door hung on itself, meaning it could have been easily unlocked once the first door was bypassed. The third door was an inch-and-one-quarter iron, and had a combination Butterworth No. 3 lock. Inside the inner vault, there were two safes.

George Leonidas Leslie moved from Cincinnati, Ohio, to New York City earlier in 1869. Once there, he met Fredericka "Marm" Mandelbaum. Leslie promised to Mandelbaum to pull off the highest-paying criminal heist in history. Mandelbaum organized a gang to rob the Ocean National Bank, and put him in charge. The robbery would essentially function as Leslie's initiation and trial run for the city's crime world. Leslie had developed an object called "the little joker" which could crack a safe's combination.

Before the robbery could take place, Mandelbaum had to get revenge with Black Lena, a woman whom Leslie was having an affair with, and who joined Mandelbaum's criminal rival Johnny Walsh. Her association with Leslie was the last straw to Mandelbaum. Mandelbaum got her associate, pickpocket Johnny Irving to steal an emerald ring from one of Black Lena's high society guests. Mandelbaum then sent the ring to Lena as a pretend gift from Leslie. Lena displayed the ring at her next dinner party, which was attended by the woman who originally wore the ring. The woman informed her husband, a New Jersey district court judge, who called in Pinkerton agents to investigate. Pinkerton agents and police raided Lena's home in Hackensack and found plenty of stolen property. Mandelbaum then felt that Leslie could focus on the Ocean National Bank robbery.

=== Planning ===
Mandelbaum spent $3,000 on the robbery's planning. Planning for the heist took three months. Leslie's gang included Billy Porter, Gilbert Yost, "Jimmy" Hope, Johnny Dobbs, Johnny Irving, John "Red" Leary, Thomas "Shang" Draper. Leslie planned the robbery with more precision than any other bank robbery before him. Draper didn't like the idea of a "tenderfoot" (or beginner) heading a robbery, but Mandelbaum insisted and said he wouldn't be involved if he didn't take orders from Leslie. Draper was sure that Leslie would fail miserably, and instructed Leary to "take care of" Leslie if he did something stupid. Leary accepted, but was lying, as he was sure to follow Leslie's every order at Mandelbaum's behest. Draper and others didn't like the length of the planning, as they wanted to quickly break in and blow up the safe.

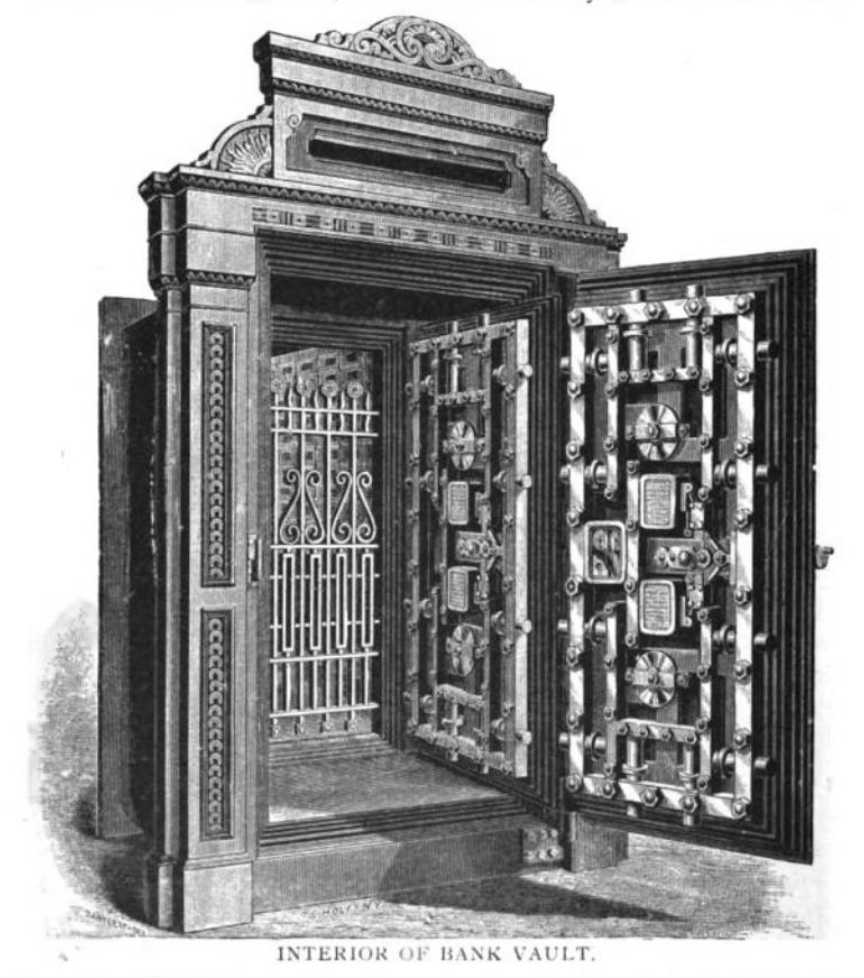
The interior of the vault room's fortified doors

Leslie deposited a large sum into Ocean National Bank, and visited it multiple times under the guise of a depositor. These visits gave him valuable information. Leslie had dinner with the bank's officials, including the president, and he asked which company had made the safe they used. He wanted to make sure it was secure, and would know if it was secure based on his experience as an architect. He received the name of the company, and met the locksmith that made the safe. The locksmith said that the safe was "impenetrable". Leslie used the info he gained talking to the locksmith to make adjustments to the "little joker”, accommodating the device to the size and shape of the safe's dial. He eventually knew every square inch of the building, and made blueprints of the bank floor. Mandelbaum provided the burglars with tools, drawing up her own blueprints, and using one of her empty warehouses to construct identical copy of one of the bank's rooms. The replica was based on the blueprints, which he made the gang study. At the warehouse, the gang rehearsed the exact processes and timing of the robbery multiple times, down to split-seconds. He would throw in alternative scenarios to the practicing, such as having them perform in the dark, in case the lights were off. A smaller version of the safe the bank used was bought and placed in the replica bank, based on Leslie's meeting with the locksmith.

Leslie convinced the bank president to hire Johnny Irving as a cleaner at the bank after hours. Prior to the robbery, he took his money out of the bank. He also asked Mandelbaum for $1,000 to rent an office basement located directly under the bank vault and leased by William Kell. Hope put on a fake mustache and wig and went to Kell. He said that he represented the insurance agency Lewis R. Cole & Co., which were agents of New York's Chicago Insurance Company and had credentials from Superintendent Barnes of the Insurance Department. He paid for the space in advance. A desk, chair, and cabinet were delivered to the basement. The cabinet contained burglar tools such as saws. During the weekend, when the robbery was supposed to take place, Irving wouldn't be working, so Leslie decided to drill a hole in the ceiling of the basement, giving them access to the vault. Leslie made everyone wear fake beards for the job; he got the beards from the dressing room of the Grand Opera House, where he was a frequent visitor.

== Robbery ==
During the robbery, which took place over two nights during a weekend, Leslie, Dobbs, and Leary entered the bank twice, Porter was parked in a get-away carriage up the street, and Hope, Yost, and Draper served as lookouts. Several days prior to the robbery, a hole was drilled in the floor of the president's office, which was two feet long and 20 inches wide, right in front of his desk.

On the first night, Friday, Irving worked his cleaning job and let Leslie, Dobbs and Leary in the back door. Dobbs removed the dial from the safe, inserted the little joker inside, and then replaced the dial. When the bank officials used the safe the next day, the little joker would record the combination stops on the lock. They decided to wait two days to open the safe, as the bank kept more money in the safe during the weekend than the weekdays.

On the second night, Sunday, Leslie asked Draper to dress like a woman, with a blond wig and a parasol, and be a lookout. Draper refused, so Leslie went to Mandelbaum. Mandelbaum forced Draper to comply, which added to Draper's animosity of Leslie. At some point, the three iron doors were forced opened. The outside door was opened in an unknown way, the middle door was opened using its keys, and the inner door was opened with jimmies and wedges. The group drilled the hole from the basement to the vault, Dobbs removed the dial, then the little joker, then replaced the dial again. The little joker had etched a series of notches into a tin plate inside the dial. Dobbs used these notches to guess the combination, and opened the safe. Leslie decided they would take only what they could carry, and only items that were untraceable, like cash, checks, and jewelry. Thus, gold and bank certificates were not taken. One box contained $160,000 in gold and gold certificates, which were left inside. $2 million in cash and securities were left lying on the floor, along with depositors boxes, which were mostly full. The basement windows were fastened and the doors were locked.

$768,879.74 was robbed in cash, securities, and jewelry, and $1,806,598 was left. It was the largest heist in New York City at the time, but not the highest-paying criminal heist in history (it would go to the Manhattan Savings Institution robbery, which Leslie was involved in).

== Aftermath ==
The next morning, a porter found a hole in the corner of the bank parlor's floor. The porter, who had a "decided sensation in the breast", rushed to the safe-room, which confirmed his fears that the bank had been robbed. The police station on Liberty Street was notified, and detectives Elder, Kelso, and Farley came to investigate. The safe room and safe were inspected. Various bank workers arrived to look at the vault, including the director Mr. Morgan, the bank's attorney, Thoedore M. Davis, tellers, and messengers.

The newly appointed police captain Thomas Brynes was put on the case. None of the detectives were able to uncover any leads. They were confused why $2 million had been left on the floor. Brynes had noticed the withdrawal of money from Leslie, but considering he was an gentlemanly, educated architect, Brynes did not make him out to be a criminal. He learned that Leslie had visited Mandelbaum's dinner parties, and said "this can't lead to anything good."

Newspapers reported on the robbery for weeks. The New York Herald called it "a masterful bank job pulled off by one very special bank robber." Boss Tweed was reported as saying, "I couldn't have done it better myself."

Nearly all of the money was turned over to Mandelbaum and laundered through her various channels. Mandelbaum gave the gang a 10 percent cut, of which Leslie took 50 percent and divided the rest among the gang. They received their cuts after the newspapers stopped reporting on the robbery, which was during the Black Friday gold panic. After the robbery, Leslie became Mandelbaum's closest confidant, and he was dubbed the "King of Bank Robbers".

Leslie went on to rob the Northampton Bank in 1876, and the Manhattan Savings Institution in 1878. The robbery of the Institution would finally fulfill Leslie's promise to Mandelbaum of performing the highest-paying criminal heist in history.

== See also ==
- List of bank robbers and robberies

== Sources ==
- Conway, J. North (2009). King of Heists: The Sensational Bank Robbery of 1878 That Shocked America. ISBN 978-1-49-304053-7
- Walling, George W (1887). Recollections of a New York Chief of Police. Caxton book concern, limited. ISBN 978-0-60-835831-4
