= Billy Porter (criminal) =

American burglar and underworld figure

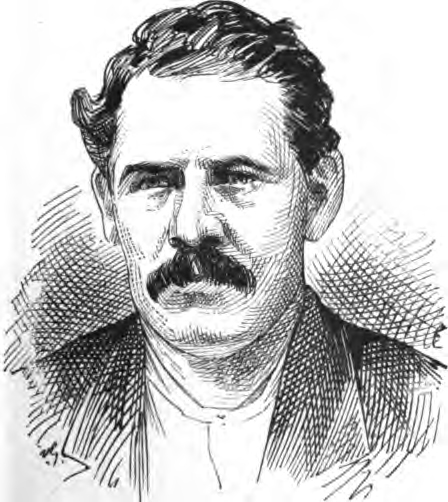
- An illustration of Billy Porter from "Recollections of a New York Chief of Police" (1887)
- Born: William O'Brien c. 1850; Boston, Massachusetts, United States
- Other names: Billy Morton, Billy O'Brien
- Occupation: Criminal
- Known for: Burglar and underworld figure in New York City during the late 19th century; member of the Dutch Mob.
- Height: 5 ft 5 1/2 in (1.66 m)

William O'Brien (1850 – unknown), better known as Billy Porter but also known by the alias William or Billy Morton, was an American burglar and underworld figure in New York City during the mid-to late 19th century. He and partner Johnny Irving were longtime members of the Dutch Mob along with Little Freddie and Michael "Sheeny Mike" Kurtz. He was present during the 1883 gunfight at Shang Draper's saloon in which Irving was shot and killed by rival John "Johnny the Mick" Walsh. O'Brien then killed Walsh and fled, but was immediately arrested outside the saloon with his .32-calibre pistol still in his coat pocket. He was tried for, and acquitted of, Walsh's death.

Like many of the Dutch Mob, O'Brien was also associated with the infamous bank robber George Leonidas Leslie and his gang. Nearly a year after the Walsh murder trial, he was among those suspected of Leslie's murder in 1884. He was among those profiled in Thomas F. Byrnes's Professional Criminals of America (1886).

== Biography ==
William O'Brien was born in Boston, Massachusetts in 1850. He was a printer by trade but began his criminal activities at a young age. By early adulthood, O'Brien had been arrested in almost every major city in the United States and was considered "second to no one in his business". According to former NYPD police detective Thomas F. Byrnes in Professional Criminals of America (1886), he was described as

Thirty-six years old in 1886. Medium build. Born in Boston. Married. Printer. Height, 5 feet 5 1/2 inches. Weight, about 145 pounds. Black curly hair, dark eyes, dark complexion. Has fine set of teeth. Has the following India ink marks: Sailor with American flag and star, in red and blue ink, on right arm; star and cross on outside of same arm; crucifixion of Christ, woman kneeling and man standing up, on left arm. He is a bright, sharp-looking fellow. Dresses well, and has plenty of nerve. Generally wears a black mustache.

By the mid-1870s, he and partner Johnny Irving became members of the Dutch Mob, a major Manhattan pickpocketing gang, which operated east of The Bowery between Houston and Fifth Streets. He and Irving were among the many underworld figures also associated with Marm Mandelbaum. It was during this period that he took part of a number of major robberies with his partners in crime. On October 11, 1877, he was arrested with Irving, Joe Dollard and George Leonidas Leslie for stealing $2,000 worth of silk hat linings from E. Tilges' warehouse on Broome Street. He was held in custody in default of a $4,000 bail set by Justice Morgan, but was subsequently released from police custody.

O'Brien was again arrested with Irving on June 5, 1878, and transported to authorities in Brooklyn where they were wanted for the burglary of Mr. Betterman's dry goods store in Williamsburg in which $5,000 worth of silk and $1,400 in cash were stolen. Neither man could be properly identified, however, and charges were dropped. A little over two months later, the two were arrested in the company of Gilbert Yost at O'Brien's Brooklyn residence at No. 152 Pachen Avenue. O'Brien was charged with the burglary of Martin Ibert's Sons' flour and grain store on Graham Avenue which had occurred the previous day. He was tried twice for the burglary, both trials ending in a hung jury, and he finally escaped with Irving from Raymond Street jail on June 1, 1879.

The two fugitives fled to Boston, and from there traveled to Providence, Rhode Island where, with Joe Dollard, they burglarized C.R. Linke, then a major jeweler in the city, breaking into its safe and stealing watches and silverware valued at $15,000 on June 27, 1879. Three days later, the three successfully eluded private detectives sent from New York to capture them. On July 23, he and Irving also escaped from police in Passaic, New Jersey but O'Brien was eventually apprehended in New York on September 28, and delivered to Sheriff Reilly in Brooklyn. He was tried and convicted by Judge Moore on October 23, 1879, and sentenced to five years imprisonment in the Kings County Penitentiary.

Along with Yost and Shang Draper, O'Brien and Irving were among those suspected in the unsolved murder of George Leslie, which had occurred back in the summer of 1878.

Just before 2:00am on the morning of October 16, 1883, O'Brien accompanied Irving to Shang Draper's Sixth Avenue saloon. While there, they became involved in an altercation with John "Johnny the Mick" Walsh, an underworld rival, resulting in Walsh drawing a pistol and killing Irving. O'Brien then drew his own weapon and killed Walsh. He then fled the saloon after killing Walsh and was arrested by a nearby police detective, who discovered Porter's .32-calibre pistol in his coat pocket. The slug in Walsh's body matched Porter's gun and he was charged with murder. However, he was acquitted by a jury on November 20, 1883.

During his imprisonment at "Crow Hill", O'Brien's mother died and left him $12,000. O'Brien is claimed to have "well provided for his mother and sisters". He kept a low profile following his release and soon left for Europe with "Sheeney" Mike Kurtz in February 1884. They had considerable success committing burglaries in England, France and Germany, netting them each $25,000 each, before returning to the United States in January 1885.

That same month, on January 14, 1885, O'Brien was arrested in New York City for his alleged involvement in the robbery of Emanuel Marks & Son, another jewelry store, in Troy, New York. The robbery, which occurred the same month he had left the country, resulted in the theft of $14,000 in jewelry. He was taken back to Troy to stand trial and it was expected that, were O'Brien not convicted, he would be tried in a separate robbery in Brooklyn where he was suspected of robbing Haydn's jewelry store a year before. The same day of his arrest, Kurtz was arrested in Jacksonville, Florida and extradited to Troy where he was tried as an accessory. In the late-1880s, his criminal career was profiled in Professional Criminals of America (1886) and Defenders and Offenders (1888). The latter publication referred to O'Brien as "one of the most celebrated crackmen and bank burglars in America".
