= 1879 in organized crime =

| List of years in organized crime |
- … 1869; 1870; 1871; 1872; 1873; 1874; 1875; 1876; 1877; 1878; 1879; 1880; 1881; 1882; 1883; 1884; 1885; 1886; 1887; 1888; 1889 …
- Art; Archaeology; Architecture; Literature; Music; Philosophy; Science; +...

== Events ==
- Giuseppe Esposito, a Sicilian bandit on the run from Italian authorities, arrives in New York via Marseilles, France. From there, he travels to New Orleans where, as "Vincenzo Rebello", he assumes leadership of the various La Cosa Nostra groups in the city. He and Joe Provenzano subsequently take control of the New Orleans waterfront.
- Joe Petrosino, future leader of the NYPD's "Italian Squad", arrives in New York City.
- Sicilian bandit leader Antonino Leone reportedly escapes from prison and subsequently disappears in North Africa.

=== February ===
- Chicago Democrats, backed by crime lord Michael Cassius McDonald, elect Carter Harrison as Mayor of Chicago in 1879. Harrison served four consecutive terms as mayor from 1879 to 1887, during which time an alliance between the city's gambling interests and politicians in Chicago is established.
- The Koyosha (Sun Facing Society), a precursor to the Genyōsha (Dark Ocean Society), is founded by Hakoda Rokusuke, Toyama Mitsuru, and Shindo Kiheita.

=== July ===
July 22 – John Lynch, a member of the Pitt Street Gang, is arrested by police for stealing four ducks from Hester Street merchant Samuel Flock and tried at Essex Market Police Court. However, released due to lack of evidence, he was arrested the following afternoon by an officer of the Tenth Precinct after stealing four pails from the Eldridge Street store of an Abraham Bernstein. Pleading guilty, he was held at a $500 bail for trial.

== Births ==
- Angelo Giordano, saloonkeeper associated the Brooklyn's Navy Street Gang
- Mariano Marsalisi, Sicilian mafioso involved in international narcotics trafficking
- Gaspare Messina, Sicilian mafioso active as a "rappresentante" for the Sicilian underworld in Boston and the New England region
- Sai Wing Mock ("Mock Duck"), leader of the Hip Sing Tong in New York's Chinatown.
