= Jimmy Hope =

American burglar, bank robber and underworld figure

James "Old Jimmy" Hope
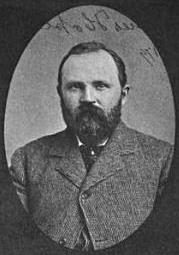
- Born: c. 1836; Philadelphia, Pennsylvania, United States
- Died: June 2, 1905 (aged 69); Manhattan, New York, US
- Resting place: Woodlawn Cemetery
- Other names: Old Jimmie Hope, Old Man Hope, Gentleman Jim and James J. Watson
- Occupation: Criminal
- Known for: New York burglar, bank robber and underworld figure; he was a member of the Leslie Gang.
- Height: 5 ft 6 in (1.68 m)
- Children: 2 sons, 2 daughters
- Relatives: Johnny Hope (son)

James "Old Jimmy" Hope (c. 1836 – June 2, 1905) was a 19th-century American burglar, bank robber and underworld figure in Philadelphia and later New York City. He was considered one of the most successful and sought after bank burglars in the United States during his lifetime as well as a skilled escape artist for his repeated breakouts from Auburn State Prison in New York.

A pioneering career criminal and safe-cracker, he planned and took part in many of the major robberies of the post-American Civil War era including those of the Kensington Savings Bank and, in partnership with Ned Lyons, the Ocean Bank and Philadelphia Navy Yard. He worked with George Leonidas Leslie on the 1869 Ocean National Bank robbery, the 1876 Northampton Bank robbery, and the 1878 Manhattan Savings Institution robbery.

== Early years in Philadelphia and New York City ==
James Hope was born to poor Irish immigrant parents in Philadelphia, Pennsylvania in about 1836. There he worked as a machinist, eventually married and started a family. On April 6, 1869, however, he and a group of men posing as police detectives stole between $80,000 and $100,000 from the Kensington Savings Bank. His partners in the robbery included Jim Casey, Jim McCormick, George Howard and three other men. Although they successfully escaped with the money, a fight over splitting up the cash resulted in the deaths of three gang members. Jim Casey was later killed by McCormick and Howard's body was found near Yonkers on the Hudson River. While in custody in San Francisco years later, Hope claimed that a member of the Kensington gang was so upset over the split that he vowed to kill Howard. Hope told authorities that he believed this dispute was the motive leading to Howard's murder.

Four months later, he and Ned Lyons, with two other men, rented a basement underneath the Ocean Bank, located at Fulton and Greenwich Streets, in New York City. They erected a partition to block passersby from looking into the basement from the street and then cut through the stone floor directly under the vault. They took over $1 million in cash and bonds but later discarded the bonds in and "took as much gold and silver as they could carry without attracting attention". This amounted to only a few thousand dollars. The following year, Hope and Lyons led another robbery against the Philadelphia Navy Yard burglarizing the paymaster's safe. Hope, by then a well-known underworld figure in the city, was a main suspect along with Lyons and two other men but none were brought to trial due to lack of evidence. Only Lyons was taken into custody and he later jumped bail. Hope was arrested for robbing Smith's Bank in Perry, New York later that year, this time convicted, and sentenced to five years imprisonment at Auburn Prison on November 28, 1870.

After three years in prison, Hope escaped from Auburn with "Big" Jim Brady, Dan Noble and Charles McCann on January 23, 1873. In the fall of that year, he and several burglars, Jim Brady, Frank McCoy, Tom McCormack and George Bliss, rented a house next to the First National Bank of Wilmington. On the morning of November 7, Hope and his partners broke into the home of the bank cashier whose home was located nearby. Their intention was to hold the family hostage while the cashier went to the bank to open the safe for them. The servant girl managed to escape from the house, however, and alerted the authorities. Hope and the others were quickly captured by the police. All were given forty lashes and sentenced to ten years in prison on November 23, 1873. They were also made to stand one hour in the pillory and pay a fine of $5,000 each. All four offered to pay $25,000 in lieu of the whipping but this was denied by the court. It would be over 30 years before another bank robbery was attempted in the state of Delaware.

Hope and his gang escaped from jail in New Castle, Delaware eight months later using a steam-powered tugboat to make their getaway. He spent the next several years out of sight participating in a number of minor robberies and burglaries including those at Wellsboro, Pennsylvania in September 1874 and 1875. Like many members of the New York's underworld, he was associated with criminal fence Frederika "Marm" Mandelbaum.

== Manhattan Savings Institution robbery ==
In 1875, he was recruited by George Leonidas Leslie and spent the next three years preparing for arguably his biggest heist, the Manhattan Savings Institution robbery. It was believed that Hope actually broke into the building long before the robbery to study the bank vault. A few months before the robbery, he and Abe Coakley were briefly imprisoned the Deep River Bank in Deep River, Connecticut and were questioned by police regarding the violent bank raid in Dexter, Maine. Both refused to cooperate and Hope was taken to Dexter, where he was a suspect in said robbery, then to Lime Rock, Maine where he was tried for a bank robbery which occurred there eight years before. He was acquitted a week later. Approximately 80% of bank robberies in New York would be attributed to the Leslie Gang until George Leslie's death nine years later.

On October 27, 1878, Hope and several masked men stormed the Manhattan Savings Institution and held janitor Louis Werckle and his family, who lived in the building, captive. Holding his wife and mother-in-law at gunpoint, the men forced Werckle to open the outer door of the bank vault then bound and gagged him with the women. Hope and Samuel "Worcester Sam" Perris then worked on the inner vault door and were eventually able to gain access using their safe-cracking tools. The robbers quietly left the bank through the back door taking with them securities and money valued at $2,757,700; of this $73,000 was in coupon bonds and $11,000 in cash.

The theft was discovered within the hour, due to Werckle freeing himself to raise the alarm, but by that time the thieves had gotten away. A subsequent investigation headed by NYPD detective Thomas F. Byrnes revealed that Patrick Shevlin, a bank watchman, had given them access to the building. Shevlin confessed under questioning that he had obtained duplicate keys and given them detailed information about the bank. He also specifically identified Hope as the leader of the gang. The ten members of the gang, including Hope and his son John, were arrested in different parts of the country and brought back to New York to stand trial. Both he and John Hope were convicted, along with Bill Kelly, but the rest of the gang were discharged from custody. Jimmy Hope was sent back to Auburn Prison but escaped within the year. Jimmy Hope swore until his death that his son John had no involvement in the robbery and had been wrongfully imprisoned.

== Imprisonment in San Francisco ==
Hope next turned up in San Francisco where he may have been involved in the theft of $65,000 from the bank of F. Berriton & Company. On the night of June 27, 1881, he was caught breaking into the Sather Bank at the southeast corner of Commercial and Montgomery Streets. He was confronted by Detective Isaiah W. Lees and a police squad almost immediately after lowering himself into the bank. Hope pulled a revolver but surrendered when he saw the detectives, armed with sawed-off shotguns, outnumbered him. His accomplice, who was on the next floor, was able to escape but later identified as Dave Cummings. He and his partner were both arrested and given long prison terms. Cummings was sent back East while Hope served seven years in San Quentin and was then transferred to Auburn Correctional Facility to serve out his remaining sentence there.

Several Eastern lawmen were waiting for Hope upon his discharge on November 11, 1886. A local court ruled against the extradition order signed by then California Governor George Stoneman, however, and a court battle postponed Hope's return to New York until May 1887. Lees assigned Officers Ed Byran and Harry Hook to accompany Hope and two New York police officers as far as Chicago, Illinois.

== Death ==
I don't ask you to paint him as an angel: I know you can't do that; he wouldn't want it himself. But I tell you that Jimmy Hope was not an ordinary man. I say that, and I know what I am talking about. He and I were educated in the same school. We're graduates from the school of hard knocks.

— Pat Sheedy

Hope settled in Manhattan after his release and lived with his wife and daughter in a modest apartment house on Columbus Avenue. On the night of June 2, 1905, Hope suffered a fatal heart attack while leaving the Lincoln Hotel on Broadway and Fifty-Second Street. He had just visited noted sportsman Pat Sheedy, with whom he had enjoyed a long friendship, who believed that Hope was attempting to tell him "an important secret" before his death. Some newspapers at the time, such as the New York Times, speculated that secret may have been the whereabouts of the still unrecovered bonds from the Manhattan Bank Robbery. Sheedy was later interviewed by the publication and paid a tribute to the memory of his friend.

The funeral was privately held at the family home, however, there were so many mourners that neighbors opened their doors when there was no more room in the small apartment and adjoining hall. Thirty carriages showed up to the building and accompanied the funeral procession to Woodlawn Cemetery where Hope was buried. Sheedy took care of the funeral arrangements and delivered the eulogy. The family wanted to deter curiosity seekers and announced the funeral was to take place at 2:00 pm, but the actual time was at 11:00 am. A large crowd gathered to witness the services despite the precaution. Among those who were in attendance included Hoboken Police Commissioner Patrick Smith, Tammany Hall political bosses Senator Timothy "Big Tim" Sullivan, "Little Tim" Sullivan, Florence Sullivan, and Philadelphia politician Robert Daily.

== See also ==
- List of bank robbers and robberies
