= Anthony Allaire =

American police detective (1829–1903)

Anthony J. Allaire
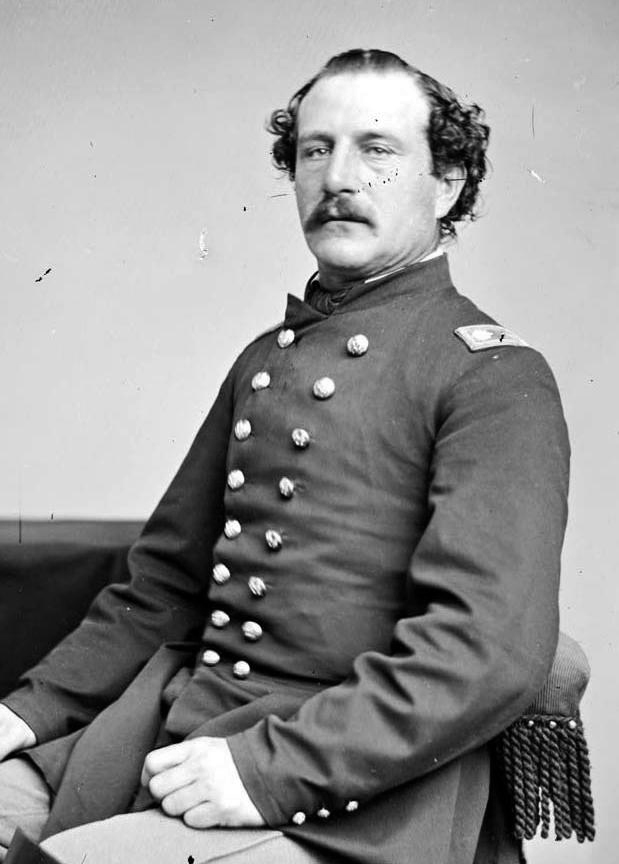
- Portrait of Allaire
- Born: February 17, 1829; Cincinnati, Ohio, United States
- Died: August 9, 1903 (aged 74); Manhattan, New York, United States
- Resting place: Woodlawn CemeteryThe Bronx
- Occupation: Police detective
- Known for: NYPD police inspector responsible for the breakup of the Slaughter House Gang and the Dutch Mob; captured murderer Daniel McFarland in 1869
- Children: 3
- Relatives: John Lamb, uncle

Anthony J. Allaire (February 17, 1829 – August 9, 1903) was an American firefighter, drillmaster, and military and law enforcement officer. A longtime police inspector for the New York City Police Department, he was responsible for the breakup of numerous street gangs, most notably the Slaughter House Gang and the Dutch Mob, as well as the capture of murderer Daniel McFarland in 1869.

== Biography ==
=== Early life and the NYPD ===
Anthony Allaire was born in Cincinnati, Ohio, on February 17, 1829. Allaire came from a prominent military family; his maternal grandfather served in the French and Indian and American Revolutionary Wars while his father was a veteran of the War of 1812 and the Mexican-American War. His uncle, Colonel John Lamb, had been wounded while fighting alongside General Richard Montgomery at the Battle of Quebec. Allaire was brought to New York City at an early age and, around 1848, he became a drillmaster for one of the many target companies existing in the city at the time.

He worked as a blacksmith for two or three years and later joined the Fireman's Brigade and attached to "Engine 41" at Delancey and Attorney Streets. Popularly known as the "Old Stag", the company was notorious for its heated rivalry with Boss Tweed's "Big Six Engine Company". Allaire officially joined the Metropolitan police force on August 24, 1860, and stationed at the Eighteenth Precinct. In May 1861, he was promoted to a roundsman and then a sergeant three months later.

=== Military career ===
At the start of the American Civil War, the Board of Police Commissioners began plans to raise four regiments to send out to the front. Allaire was serving as drillmaster to a small group of men on Rikers Island and was one of the first to volunteer his services to the Union Army. He and his men were organized as Company E and incorporated into the 133rd New York Volunteer Infantry. Allaire was elected the company's captain and first commander.

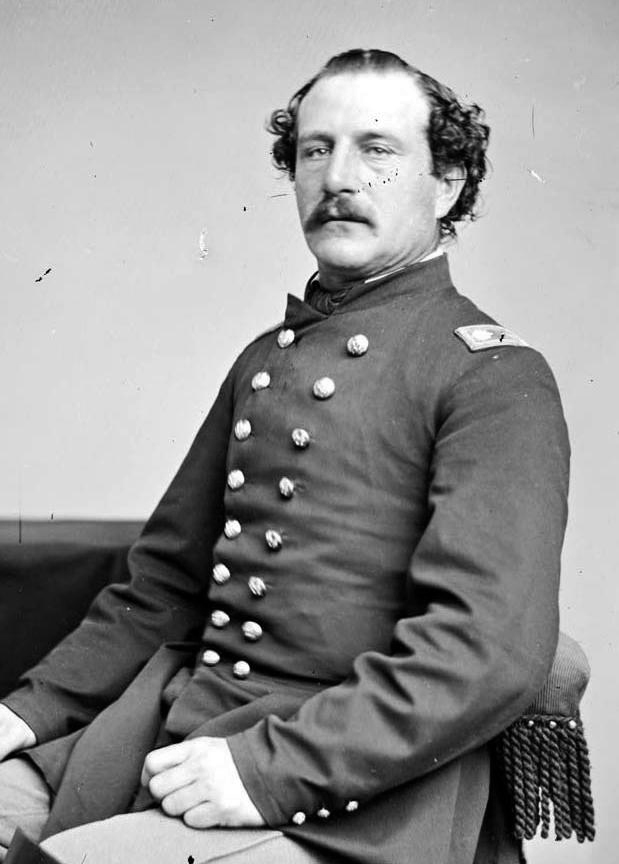
Allaire while serving with the 133rd New York Volunteer Infantry Regiment.

Allaire quickly rose in rank until his eventual appointment as lieutenant colonel of the regiment. He saw action at Port Hudson, Marksville Plains, Fort Bisland, Cross Roads and Vermilion as well as engagements along the Red River. During General Philip Sheridan's campaign against General Jubal Early in 1864, Allaire was placed in charge of guarding a Union pay train carrying $3 million in special back pay for Sheridan's troops and defended the train against Confederate guerillas. Allaire was mustered out June 6, 1865. On December 3, 1867, President Andrew Johnson nominated Allaire for the award of the grade of brevet brigadier general to rank from March 13, 1865, for "meritorious conduct on the field" and the U.S. Senate confirmed the award on February 14, 1868.

=== Return to New York ===
After being mustered out of the military in July 1865, Allaire returned to the police force as a roundsman and was reinstated at his former rank five days later. He was assigned to the Fifteenth Precinct until his promotion to captain on May 23, 1867. He was put in charge of a number of precinct houses throughout Manhattan and, as well as serving with the famed "Steamboat Squad", he "broke up dens of vice and crime" along Chatham Street. Allaire was reportedly the first police officer to successfully gain entrance to these establishments.

He became widely known for combating the many street gangs which were active in New York during the post-Civil War era. While precinct captain of the Eighteenth Precinct, he was active against criminal elements in the notorious Forth Ward and the New York waterfront. His campaign against the Slaughter House Gang, a group of river pirates based at Johnny Dobbs's saloon at Water Street and James Slip, eventually resulted in the breakup of the organization with the help of the "Steamboat Squad".

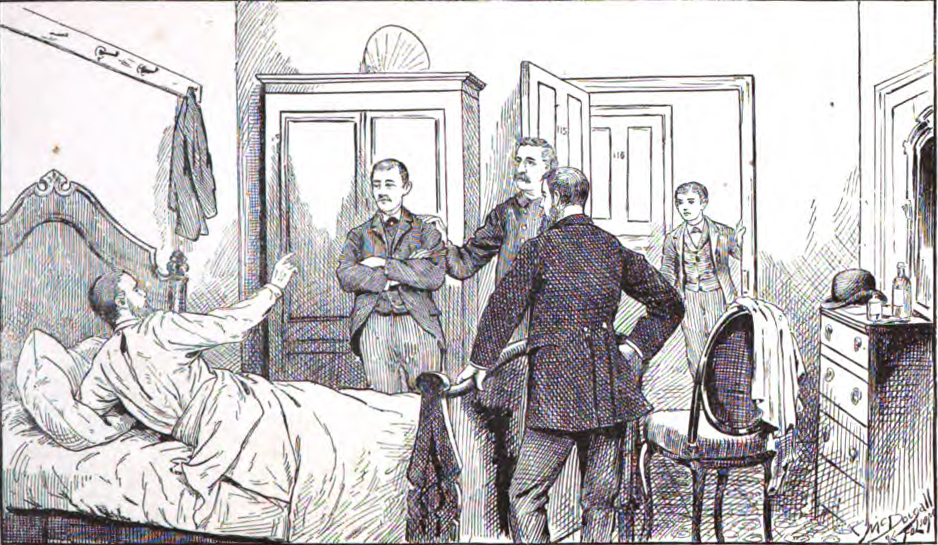
Allaire stands guard over Daniel McFarland as Albert D. Richardson identifies him as his murderer.

Allaire, then captain of the Fourth Precinct, was the chief investigator of the murder of Albert D. Richardson, one of the editors for the New York Tribune, who had been shot by Daniel McFarland over a love affair with McFarland's wife. Despite an exhaustive manhunt, Allaire managed to track down McFarlane who was hiding out at his brother's stationery store on Broadway. In a desperate attempt to lure him out of hiding, Allaire sent a letter to McFarland imitating his brother's handwriting and signature allowing him to set up a trap to capture him at the Westmoreland Hotel on the corner Seventeenth Street and Fourth Avenue. Allaire brought the accused man to the dying Richardson at the Astor House where he identified McFarland as his attacker.

In 1877, Allaire declared war upon a vicious gang of criminals active in the east side area between Houston and Fifth Street known as the Dutch Mob. Only recently assigned to the local Eighteenth Precinct, Allaire led a "strong-arm squad" to drive the Dutch Mob out of the area. Among its members, Johnny Irving, Mike Kurtz, Dutch Chris, Billy Porter and Little Freddie were all arrested and imprisoned. Several of these men received long jail terms in part to Allaire's efforts.

Allaire was also responsible for capturing the infamous forger gang headed by Joe Elliot, Charley Becker and Clem Harris after they had attempted to pass a worthless $60,000 check on the New York Safe Deposit Bank. Becker turned state's evidence soon after his arrest and the others were given long prison sentences.

=== Retirement and later years ===
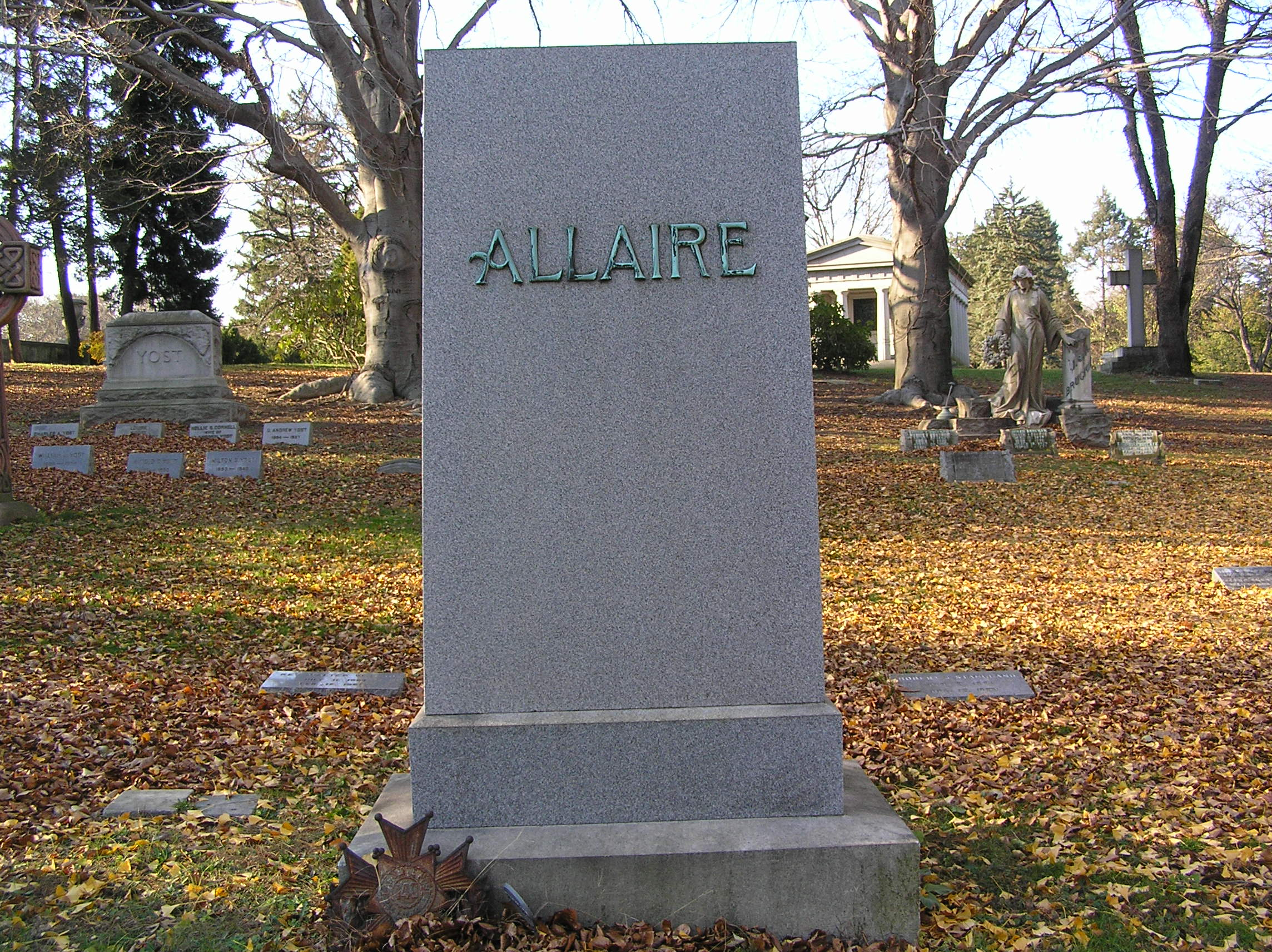
The gravesite of Anthony Allaire in Woodlawn Cemetery

In his later years on the force, he was the official drillmaster for the department and was in charge of police parades. He was also involved in the Freemasons, the Loyal Legion, the Ohio Society of New York, the Association of Exempt Firemen, the Association of the Nineteenth Army Corps and the Noah L. Farnham Post of the Grand Army of the Republic. Despite his accomplishments however, he was never able to advance to the rank of police inspector due to physical disability and increasingly poor health. The position of chief police inspector eventually went to Captain Alexander S. Williams and Peter Conlin. On October 7, 1902, after 42 years of service, Allaire was retired on a pension by Police Commissioner John Nelson Partridge after being found unfit for duty by the Board of Surgeons.

Suffering from Bright's disease during his final year, he fell seriously ill while at a summer resort in central New Jersey. His request to be taken back to his home was granted and, being nearly blind, insisted on dictating his notes to his son-in-law Lester Ketcham as part of his memoirs. Allaire died at his West 91st Street home on August 9, 1903. He was buried at New Rochelle.

As a result of the construction of I-95, most graves from the Allaire Family Cemetery in New Rochelle were moved to St Paul's Church in New Rochelle in the 1950s. However, Anthony J. Allaire's grave was relocated to Woodlawn Cemetery in the Bronx.
