= Johnny Hope =

American burglar, bank robber and pickpocket

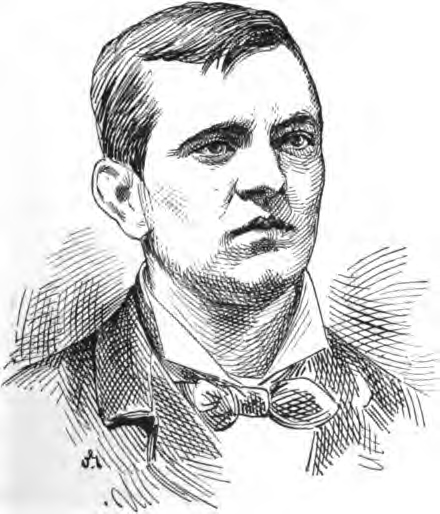
- An illustration of Johnny Hope from "Recollections of a New York Chief of Police" (1887) by George W. Walling
- Born: John Hope; 1856; New York City, New York, United States
- Died: 1906 (aged 49–50); Manhattan, New York
- Other names: Johnny Watson, John Watson, John Warren, Lewis R. Cole
- Occupation: Saloon keeper
- Known for: New York burglar, bank robber and pickpocket; he was a member of the Leslie Gang.
- Height: 5 ft 9 in (1.75 m)
- Parent: Jimmy Hope

John Hope (1856–1906) was a 19th-century American burglar, bank robber and pickpocket. The son of James "Old Jimmy" Hope, he was alleged to have been associated with his father and the George Leslie Gang. He was among those arrested for the 1878 robbery of the Manhattan Savings Institution although he and Billy Kelly were the only men actually sent to prison for this crime.

There was some controversy over his imprisonment at the time, in which a two-year court battle was fought, and ultimately saw him sent to Sing Sing for 20 years. Doubts over his guilt, however, would eventually result in his receiving a pardon from New York Governor David B. Hill in 1890.

== Biography ==
Born in New York City, New York, Johnny Hope was one of four children born to James "Old Jimmy" Hope in 1856. Hope followed his father into crime and became considered "a clever burglar" in several major cities across the United States. He eventually joined his father in New York City where he was arrested for pickpocketing in 1877. He may have been involved in the Manhattan Savings Institution robbery, led by his father, on the morning of October 27, 1878 netting nearly $3 million in cash and securities.

Four months after the robbery, on February 18, 1879, Hope was arrested while leaving the Theatre Comique by Detective Thomas F. Byrnes. Although all ten members of the robbery were captured, only Hope and Billy Kelly were sentenced to prison. John Nugent, the New York police officer who had assisted the Leslie Gang during the robbery, was recognized while attending Hope's trial as a spectator and arrested in the courtroom. "Old Jimmy" Hope was also returned to Auburn State Prison, where he had previously escaped from in 1873, and successfully broke out within the year. Johnny Hope was tried in the Court of General Sessions and, after a near five-week trial, was convicted of first-degree robbery on July 18, 1879. He was sentenced by Judge Rufus B. Cowing to 20 years imprisonment in the state prison but the case was appealed resulting in a two-year legal battle before the case was finally upheld by the New York Court of Appeals. Hope was held in the Tombs during this time and was finally transferred to Sing Sing on February 3, 1881.

His father offered to return the stolen bonds in exchange for dropping charges against his son but this was declined by Manhattan Bank President Edward Schell. For the rest of his life, Jimmy Hope maintained that his son was innocent of the charges and that "he had been the victim of his father's misdeeds". There were still those who questioned Hope's conviction, partly due to the largely circumstantial evidence used to convict him, and became a cause célèbre during his incarceration. He was finally granted a pardon by then New York Governor David B. Hill and released from Sing Sing on October 22, 1890.

Following his release, he lived quietly in Manhattan for the rest of his life. On January 4, 1904, under the false name John Warren, Hope appeared before the very judge who had originally sentenced him to Sing Sing 25 years before. One of an estimated fifty men accused of bookmaking, the result of District Attorney William T. Jerome's campaign against the city's "poolsellers", he was recognized by Judge Cowing. When the verdict resulted in a hung jury, he allowed Hope to go free on his old bail bond rather than return him to the Tombs as requested by the prosecution. Johnny Hope died in 1906, a year after his father.
