= Perris (surname) =

Perris is a surname. Notable people by that name include:

- Chad Perris (born 1992), vision-impaired Australian athlete
- Edouard Perris (1808–1878), French explorer and entomologist
- Frank Perris (1931–2015), British former Grand Prix motorcycle road racer
- Fred T. Perris (1837–1916), Chief Engineer of the California Southern Railroad
- Giorgos Perris (born 1983), Greek pop singer
- Samuel Perris (1840–?), French-Canadian burglar, safe cracker and bank robber
- Thomas E. Perris (born 1936), American Builder and driver of land speed record cars at Bonneville.
