= McGloin =

McGloin is an Irish surname originating in Munster. Notable people with the surname include:

- Matt McGloin (born 1989), American football player
- Mike McGloin (c. 1862–1883), American criminal
