= Mike Kurtz =

American burglar and gang leader

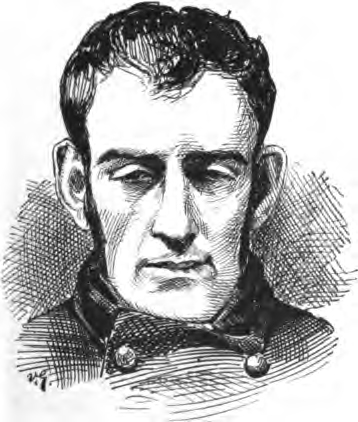
- Sheeny Mike Kurtz, c.1888
- Born: Michael C. Kurtz c. 1845; New York City, United States
- Died: November 24, 1904 (aged 59); Manhattan
- Other names: Sheeney Mike; Sheeny Mike; Mike Whelan; Michael Sheehan; Mike Sine; Bobby Bat; Frank Lazeratti; Dick Bromlinson
- Occupation: Criminal
- Known for: Burglar and gang leader in New York City during the late 19th century; co-founder of the Dutch Mob.

Michael "Sheeny Mike" Kurtz (c. 1845—November 24, 1904) was an American burglar and gang leader in New York City during the mid-to late 19th century. He was one of the co-founders of the Dutch Mob, along with Little Freddie and Johnny Irving, during the 1870s. Kurtz and the others controlled the area between Houston and 5th Streets for several years until the gang was driven out by "strong-arm squads" under Captain Anthony Allaire in 1876. A year later he was arrested in Boston for robbing a silk house owned by Scott & Co. and sentenced to 12 years imprisonment. It was while in prison that he discovered that eating common soap could produce the effect of ill health. His sudden and unexplainable weight loss and other symptoms baffled the prison doctors and he was able to fool officials that he was dying and received a pardon.

Kurtz was sentenced to 18 and a half years imprisonment in Clinton Prison on March 30, 1880, however he was later released on appeal. He would later go on to have a successful career as a bank robber and jewelry thief with his former partner Johnny Irving throughout the 1880s and early 90s. He was associated with many underworld figures in New York including Billy Porter, Frank McCoy, "Banjo" Pete Emerson and criminal fence Marm Mandelbaum. He and Porter later traveled to Europe where they had considerable success as burglars before returning to the United States.

On April 2, 1894, he took part in the robbery of Albert J. Knoll's Jersey Street saloon in Elizabethtown, New Jersey with "Dutch" Fred Ryder and ex-policeman Michael Malone. He and his accomplices were eventually arrested for this robbery and all agreed to turn state's evidence. Kurtz and the others later testified that they had been hired to rob the saloon by David McAdams, New Jersey sportsman and manager of the Red Jacket Hotel, in exchange for a percentage of the $800 in cash.

Spending at least 17 years of his life in jail, Kurtz was estimated to have taken part in at least 150 major robberies amounting to over $7 million (when adjusted for inflation, that would be equivalent of $112 million). At the time of his death however, his family had disowned him and he was penniless when he died of consumption in Bellevue Hospital on November 24, 1904.
