= Samuel Perris =

French-Canadian burglar, safe cracker and bank robber

"Worcester" Sam Perris
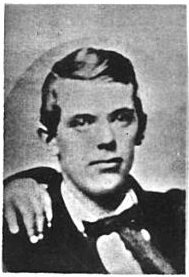
- Born: Samuel Parris c. 1840; Canada
- Occupation: Criminal
- Known for: New York burglar, bank robber and underworld figure; he was a member of the Leslie Gang.
- Height: 5 ft 8 in (1.73 m)

Samuel "Worcester Sam" Perris (c. 1840 – unknown) was a 19th-century French-Canadian burglar, safe cracker and bank robber. An underworld figure in New York City and throughout the northeastern United States during the post-American Civil War era, he was called "one of the most notorious criminals in America".

Perris participated in nearly every major bank robbery in the United States during a 20-year period including taking part in the robberies of the Grafton National Bank and the Philadelphia Navy Yard in 1870. A member of George Leonidas Leslie's criminal gang during the 1870s, Perris was a principal participant in the robberies of the Manhattan Savings Institution and the Dexter Savings Bank in 1878.

== Biography ==
Born in Canada in 1840, Samuel Parris later emigrated to the United States where he would become one of the most wanted burglars in the Northeastern United States during the 1860s and 70s. Though of French Canadian descent, and fluent in the French language, he was able to speak English without an accent. Working with noted criminals such as Old Jimmie Hope and Johnny Dobbs, among others, he was described as "a man of undoubted nerve, and has a first-class reputation among the fraternity". Perris specialized in banks and railroad office safes, and during a 20-year period, participated in nearly every major bank robbery in the United States.

In 1870 alone, Perris staged the robberies of the Philadelphia Navy Yard and the Grafton National Bank in Worcester, Massachusetts; he and an accomplice escaped with $180,000 in the latter robbery. Perris was caught by police after the Grafton bank job, however, he escaped custody on April 5, 1872. He broke out of the Worcester jailhouse by forcing open the bars of a fourth story window in the north end of the building, with the help of a jackscrew smuggled in from the outside, and climbed outside using a rope. He remained at large for at least 15 years in spite of a $3,000 reward offered by county commissioners for his capture. One of the reasons he was able to evade arrest was wearing a beard, and regularly changing its style, as the few pictures Perris showed him clean-shaven; he was always "smooth-faced" part of the time. The only identifying marks were a "prominent" dimple on his chin and a scar from a pistol-shot on his right eyebrow.

By the mid-1870s, he had become a familiar figure in New York's underworld and was among those associated with Fredericka "Marm" Mandelbaum and John D. "Traveling Mike" Grady. In 1875, Perris was recruited by George Leonidas Leslie along with Jimmy Hope, Jimmy Brady, Abe Coakley, Red Leary, Shang Draper, Johnny Dobbs, and "Banjo" Pete Emerson. The three-year plan to rob the Manhattan Savings Institution, occurring on the morning of October 27, 1878, resulted in the theft of $300,000 in cash and securities. Earlier that year, Perris took part in robbing the Dexter Savings Bank in Dexter, Maine, with Jimmy Hope and Johnny Dobbs, in which he was alleged to have killed bank treasurer JH Barron.

When Leslie was found murdered at Tramps' Rock on June 4, 1878, Perris was taken into custody with Shang Draper and Johnny Dobbs. Police believed that Leslie had been murdered at a Brooklyn gang hideout, located at No. 101 Lynch Street, then carried off on a butcher cart driven by Perris, Dobbs and Ed Goodie to dump Leslie's body. The three men were seen near Yonkers around the time Leslie was discovered but all three were released due to lack of evidence.
