= Northampton Bank robbery =

1876 bank robbery in Northampton, Massachusetts

Coordinates: 42°19′8″N 72°37′52″W

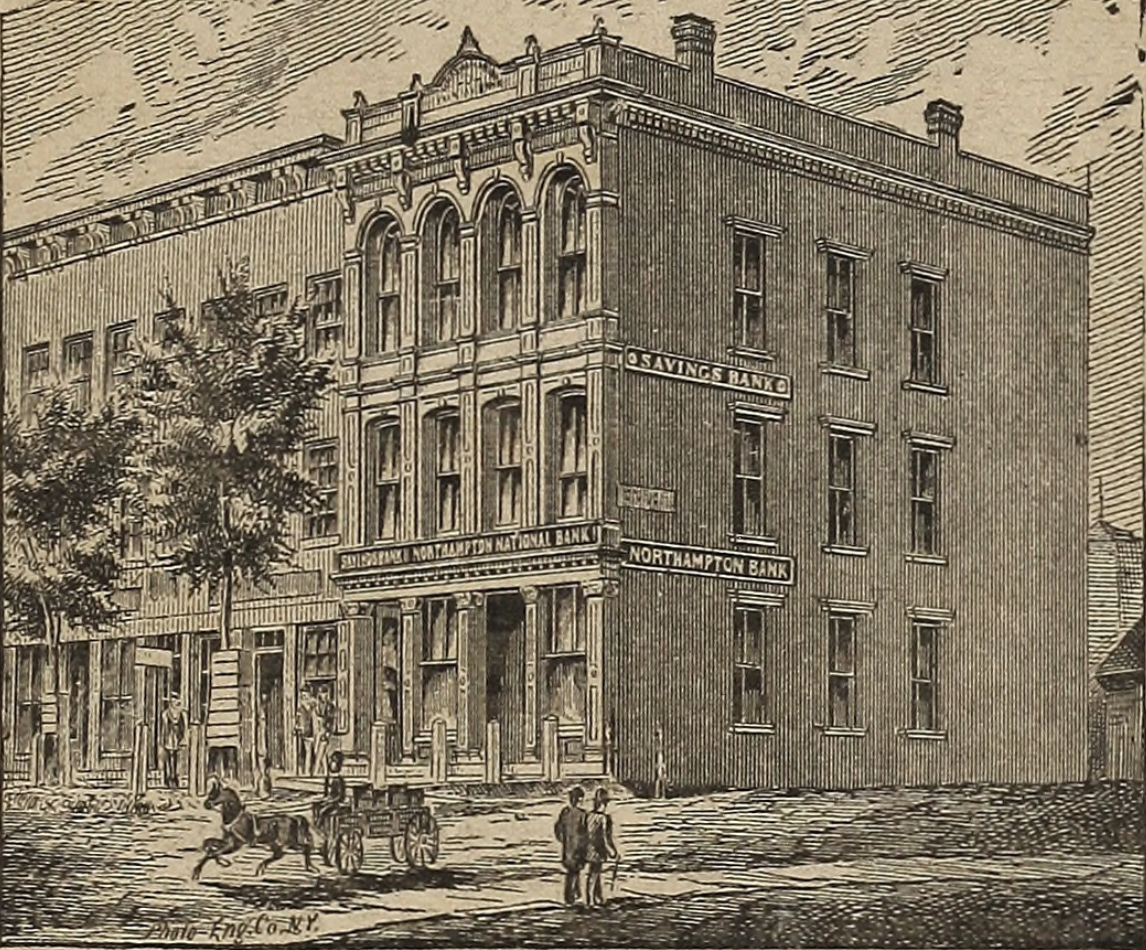
- The Northampton Bank in 1876
- Date: January 26, 1876
- Location: Northampton National Bank, Northampton, Massachusetts
- Perpetrator: Rufus Gang
- Participants: 8
- Outcome: Bank robbery of $1.6 million

On January 26, 1876, the Northampton Bank in Northampton, Massachusetts, was robbed of $1.6 million ($26 million in 2019) in cash, bonds, and other securities by the Rufus Gang, which was led by Thomas Dunlap, Robert Scott, and George Leonidas Leslie. Leslie planned the robbery, but did not participate on the day. It was the largest bank robbery in U.S. history at the time. 75 depositors lost their money.

In 1874, the bank hired safe manufacturer Herring & Co. to install a new lock on the vault. Herring & Co. sent William Edson, a bank robber and traveling sales agent for the company. In 1875, he copied the key to the vault and to the bank and gave them to the Rufus Gang. On the night of the robbery, they got the safe combination from the bank's cashier, Mr. Whittlesey, whom they tortured at his house until he gave it up.

After the robbery, Leslie cut ties with Dunlap and Scott over their use of violence, which was not a part of his plan. Edson was caught, and was freed after turning state's evidence. Dunlap, Scott, and member Billy Connors were sentenced to 20 years in prison. Scott eventually returned the securities to the bank in an unsuccessful attempt at gaining leniency. Leslie was not implicated until the investigation into the Manhattan robbery, but he was never convicted.

== Background ==
Northampton Bank, also known as the First National Bank of Northampton or the Northampton National Bank, was a bank located at 135 Main Street, Northampton, Massachusetts, 150 miles from New York City. It was one of the leading financial institutions of the city. The bank's cashier was Mr. Whittlesey, also spelled Whittlesley. In 1874, the bank decided to increase their security by installing a new cylinder pin-tumbler lock on the vault. They hired safe manufacturer Herring & Co. to bring an employee over to install the lock. William D. Edson, bank robber and traveling agent for Herring & Co., was the one who Herring & Co. sent over. He had made copies of keys used in previous bank robberies.

George Leonidas Leslie, was an architect, art patron, socialite, and bank robber who moved to New York City in 1869. Law enforcement claimed he was involved in 80% of all bank robberies in the United States between 1869 and 1879, including the theft of $800,000 from Ocean National Bank in New York City in 1869, and the theft of $2.7 million from the Manhattan Savings Institution in New York City in 1878. He would often become a depositor of the banks he robbed, and replicated the interiors of the banks in a warehouse so that his gang could meticulously practice the heists. He invented a device named "the little joker" which could crack a safe's combination.

Thomas Dunlap and Robert Scott were the ringleaders of the Northampton robbery. They had come from Chicago to New York after the Great Chicago Fire of October 1871. They were already known to the police in New York as bank robbers. Dunlap and Scott would give their possessions from the robberies to Fredericka "Marm" Mandelbaum, who would then fence it for them. In January 1876, they had robbed a bank on Sixth Avenue in New York City by themselves, and were allegedly planning to rob a bank in Elmira, New York, with Edson.

=== Planning ===
Those were involved were Leslie, Dunlap, Robert Scott, "Billy" Connors, Billy Porter, Gilbert Yost, James Burns, Johnny Irving, "Red" Leary, and Thomas "Shang" Draper, though the ones who ultimately robbed the bank were Dunlap, Scott, Connors, Irving, Porter, Draper, and Yost. Out of the group, Leslie was the only one not known to New York police and the Pinkerton detective agency as a criminal.

Initially, Dunlap and Scott had asked Mandelbaum about their plan to rob the Northampton bank. Mandelbaum let the two contact Leslie, who agreed to mastermind the robbery for a fee of $20,000. Connors was eventually involved. Leslie had never worked with Dunlap, Scott, or Connors before. Leslie was not involved with the burglary physically, though he planned every part of it; it was Scott who had asked Leslie for his expertise. They chose a code name for their group, which was the "Rufus Gang", or Rufus Ring, named after Robert Scott. Northampton National Bank was chosen because it had vaults and safes that were easy to open, and various sources claimed the vaults contained large cash reserves. They found out about the bank through Edson, who recommended the bank in exchange for a share of the stolen money. The amount agreed to was $50,000.

Edson visited Dunlap and Scott at the Wyoming Valley Hotel in Wilkes-Barre, Pennsylvania, on August 5, 1875. Dunlap sent Edson (here named W.L. Edwards) a telegram to invite him:

WILKESBARRE, Pa., Aug 5, 1875. To W.L. Edwards, 241 West Fifty-second street, New York.

Come to-morrow.

R.C. HILL.

Handwriting on that telegram and one other belonged to Dunlap. At the hotel, in the hotel registry, the names "R.C. Hill" from Boston, and "Wm. D. Edson" were written. Dunlap wrote the signature for "R.C. Hill" and Edson wrote his name.

Starting in September, the group, including Leslie, travelled between Brooklyn and Northampton, to plan and watch the bank employees and deputy sheriff. They planned how they would escape, and where they would hide the money. They knew that the bank's night watchman leaves at 4 a.m. Leslie planned for the money to be hid in the Bridge Street Cemetery, which was just off the main thoroughfare of Northampton, and was close to the train station, which would be used as the getaway, and Bridge Street School; at some point, a base of operations was set up in the school's attic. It was decided to not use the roof to get inside the bank, as the third floor of the bank was the private residence of Judge Thomas Forbes. The gang decided to find a bank employee who might offer his involvement for a cut of the resulting money, so they spent several days observing Whittlesey. They found out "everything about him, his family, and their routines." His house was about two-thirds of a mile from the bank. They decided he could not be bribed, and found another way to use Whittlesey to their advantage. They found Whittlesey left work at 4 p.m., and then the night watchman, Deputy Sheriff Henry Potter stayed overnight. After learning this, Edson became involved.

On November 22, Edson went to the bank to found out what he could about the vault and the safe combination. Edson told the bank manager, Thomas Warriner, that he was on there on Herring & Co. business, and that he had to examine the vault as part of "routine maintenance" on the safe. Warriner said the vault keys were a little "tight", and Edson said he could fix that. Warriner allowed Edson to remove the locks, and take them along with the vault key and the bank key. He took them back to his private boarding house in town where he worked on them. He made wax impressions of the keys, which he then gave to Dunlap and Scott. Edson went back to the bank, returned the keys, and suggested that a new vault combination should be made, but only one person, John Whittlesey, should know it. Warriner agreed, and Edson left. A new combination was made, that both Whittlesey and Warriner knew about. The last thing investigated were the hours of Henry Potter. They found Potter left at 4 a.m. and Whittesey opened at 8 a.m., leaving 4 hours in which the bank was unattended. Leslie approved the final plan.

After several months, Leslie eventually turned his plans over to Dunlap, Scott, and Connors. The three then secured the involvement of Leary, Porter, Draper, Irving and Yost, who had been recommended by Leslie. Leslie had chosen them for their experience and indebtedness to Fredericka "Marm" Mandelbaum, Leslie's mentor, which made them less likely to betray the group. Another reason was that Leslie had been having an affair with Shang's wife Babe, and Red's wife Kate. Shang and Red being in Massachusetts meant there was more time for Leslie to be with the women in New York.

At some point, the gang tried twice to rob the bank, but failed.

A few weeks prior, the gang met at a livery yard, and they told someone there that they had planned to do a surprise party in Holyoke. A hostler was able to get a clear look at one of the robbers, who was unnamed. On the morning of January 25, 1876, Dunlap and Scott were witnessed in Springfield, Massachusetts, by Albert Holt, paymaster of the Boston and Albany railroad company. Dunlap and Scott met three other men at two different points. Holt also saw Scott and Dunlap enter a store in Springfield on the 26th.

== Robbery ==
At 12 a.m. on January 26, 1876, Whittlesey was at his home asleep. Also in the house was his wife, her niece, Mattie White, a girl named Annie Beaton, a married couple, Mr. and Mrs. T.B. Cutler, a servant, Kate Nugent, and other family friends. The men put on masks and then carried lanterns while entering Whittlesey's home. Inside, they would refer to each other in numbered code. They stopped all the clocks so the people inside would have no idea what time it was. They woke everyone in the house up, made them dress, handcuffed them, and brought them into Whittlesey's room, making them "as comfortable as possible." They started taking Mr. Whittlesey downstairs, and Mrs. Whittlesey begged them not to hurt him. Downstairs, he was handcuffed to a chair. Dunlap and Scott began their interrogation of him; Scott held a gun to Whittlesey's head, and Scott said he should give the numbers without hesitation. Whittlesey gave them false combination numbers; when he could not repeat the numbers, he was beaten. He eventually gave them the right combination. His gold watch was taken. Around 4 a.m., the gang bound and gagged everyone, leaving Whittlesey downstairs, and left for the bank. They left two guards at the house. They used a key Edson had made to get in the bank. The group got inside the vault and collected everything they saw. Then they returned to the home, resecured the group's bonds, and the whole gang left the house. Most of the stolen securities were left under a stop at the Bridge Street School. Most of the gang left the town by the train station, though some left by horse and carriage, and returned to the livery stable. Around 6:30 a.m., Mrs. Whittlesey freed herself from her restraints and screamed from her bedroom window: "They've taken my husband and are robbing the bank! They're all at the bank! Please help my husband!" Several men walking to their work heard her, and notified the police.

1.6 million ($26 million in 2019 dollars) in cash, bonds, and other securities (negotiable and non-negotiable) was robbed. It was the largest bank robbery in American history at the time. The money was made up of $75,000 of Ohio and Mississippi railroad bonds (worth $800 per $1000 of face value), $12,000 in bank bills, $6000 in government notes, $5000 Missouri bonds, and a large number of bank notes. About 75 depositors lost their money. The negotiable securities were mostly useless to the group, and the non-negotiable securities had no value unless could sell them back to the bank.

== Aftermath ==
It was reported that the bank "did not suffer greatly." Police quickly found that burglars rode from Springfield to Northampton on the 25th, and that they had visited the livery stable. Four days later, the bank hired Pinkerton detectives to investigate.

Leslie was shocked to read in the newspapers about the break-in to Whittlesey's home and the torturing of him, as those methods were not in Leslie's plans; Leslie thought nobody should be hurt in a robbery. The break-in, torturing, and stealing of Whittlesey's watch helped turn the public's favor from bank robbers, back to the banks, who had been viewed as untrustworthy since the Panic of 1873. Leslie contacted Dunlap and Scott and told them he wanted nothing more to do with them. He demanded they return the gold watch to Whittlesey, so Scott returned the watch to him by mail. Leslie also told Mandelbaum to stop associating with the two; she initially disagreed, as she worried they would starting working for her rival, John "Traveling Mike" Grady. After this, Leslie decided it would be safer to personally oversee every robbery he was to be a part of.

Draper, Irving, Leary, Porter, and Yost resumed their former lives. Leslie was worried that he would be linked to the robbery, considering everyone else in the gang were already known to detectives, and that he would not be able to rob the Manhattan Savings Institution. Leslie warned them Edson would probably be captured and give up their names as part of a plea bargain, so they should keep a low profile; they did not listen to him.

=== Attempts to sell the securities ===
Edson went to New York to collect his share. Robert Scott would communicate with him after placing a classified ad in the New York Herald with instructions on how to meet. The two met on the corner of 34th Street and Broadway, where Edson was paid $1,200, much less than the $50,000 they agreed upon. Edson was "livid", and told Scott about how the non-negotiable securities were useless unless they could sell them back. Edson convinced Scott to sell the securities back. Dunlap, Scott, Connors, and Edson returned to Northampton, and decided not to retrieve the securities from the school as police were everywhere in the town. Instead, Edson went to the bank and claimed to be a mediator between the robbers and the bank, and that the robbers could sell the securities for $150,000. The bank had offered $60,000 ransom back, and Edson left. Back in New York City, Edson met Dunlap, Scott, and Connors, and said the bank had offered the $60,000 ransom. Scott was "furious" and refused. He decided that Edson compromised the gang by speaking to the manager, and that he could no longer be trusted. Scott said he was done with Edson, and Edson said he would work on his own plan.

On February 16, Northampton doubled the amount of police guarding the roads leading into the town, as they believed that the bulk of the stolen securities were still somewhere in town. The police said that if their search for the money lead nowhere, then would begin negotiations with the robbers (who were known to detectives by that point), and the robbers would return the securities in exchange for them keeping $12,000 and gaining immunity from prosecution.

The negotiations lasted a year and had no result. After several months, the hidden securities were retrieved from Northampton. Scott and Dunlap sent a ransom note to the bank regarding the non-negotiable securities, authenticated by two stock certificates owned by private depositors. The note offered $150,000. Warriner did not respond and attempted to travel to New York. Scott refused to meet with anyone from the bank. Then, the bank stalled the negotiations, sending "dubious" replies. In September, Edson ran into Scott on a trolley car by accident. The two argued, and Scott said Edson would not receive one cent from the securities. Scott stormed off on the first available stop. In October, Scott sent a letter to the bank, asking for $150,000; the bank refused to negotiate. Scott sent two more letters in October. The bank stalled the negotiations in order to give more time to the Pinkertons' investigation. In November, Scott, Dunlap, and Connors decided to contact Edson. Edson was fearful of them, but still agreed to meet. They argued about the purpose of Edson meeting Warriner as a negotiator. Edson said it was strictly to sell the securities and that no information on the gang was given; Scott called him a liar. Still, they agreed to let Edson help sell them again. Edson would set up a meeting with the bank, and Connors would be at the meeting to negotiate. In mid-November, Connors met with Northampton Bank's president, who said he would only offer $60,000. Connors left without a deal.

=== Dissolution of the Rufus Gang ===
Scott, Dunlap, and Connors gave up on negotiations and left New York for Philadelphia on January 13, 1877. At some point, Connors showed up to Leslie's home, and asked for help in getting rid of the securities. Leslie got rid of Connors, saying there was a rule to never visit him at his home, and that Connors should never contact him again.

On February 14, Pinkerton detective Benjamin Franklin saw Dunlap and Scott at a train station in Philadelphia, on a train going south to Richmond, Virginia. Franklin had a warrant for their arrest, and he took them off the train and arrested them. They had suitcases carrying burglar's tools. After they were arrested, the two admitted nothing to Franklin, said he was mistaken, and would not sign the order for the return of the money. On the 15th, Connors was arrested at a New York restaurant. Leary, Draper, Irving, Porter, and Yost were arrested, but the charges were dropped due to a lack of evidence. Connors and Leary were held in the Ludlow Street Jail. Edson was soon arrested, and turned state's evidence, giving up the names of those involved in the robbery, as he felt he they did not give him as much money from it as he deserved. Because of this, he would go free.

On the 17th, Dunlap and Scott were brought back to Northampton. They were to be trialed twice, the first for the bank robbery, and the second for entering Whittlesey's home, attacking him and stealing his watch. The bank robbery charge carried a sentence of twenty years, while the latter charge carried a sentence of life imprisonment. On March 22 and 23, in the Superior Court of Hampshire County, the two were bound over for trial under Judge H.H. Wilson. Authorities found out exactly how they collaborated with Edson. They were put under bonds of $500,000 each. They were indicted by a Grand Jury on June 12 for entering Whittlesey's house and stealing his watch, and breaking and entering the bank and stealing from it. They both plead not guilty on June 15.

For a while, Leslie was not implicated; his place in high society kept him from being suspected. Afterwards, Leslie started being involved in instructing and planning bank robberies across the country. He never forgave himself for not being at the robbery, saying his presence might have averted the aftermath.

In June, when Connors' extradition from New York to Northampton was being prepared, he got a key to his cell, unlocked the door, and let himself out.

=== Trials of Dunlap and Scott ===
==== Trial 1 ====
The first trial began on July 9. The prosecutors were District Attorney S.T. Field, assisted by Edward B. Gillett, (who made their final argument), Charles Delano, Geo M. Stearns, and police officer Pinkerton (not of the Pinkerton agency). The defense was Theo H. Sweetser, assisted by brothers D.W. Bond and H.W. Bond, and J.M. Moore (a friend of Scott).

On July 9, the first witness was engineer E.C. Davis, who exhibited a plan of Whittlesey's house that he had drawn. The second witness was Whittlesey, who described the events of the night, and identified Dunlap and Scott as those responsible. Edson was a witnesses on the second day, and described the planning and the Springfield trip; Sweetser objected to discussion of the trip, and Gillett withdrew the comments. Sweetser objected to how much evidence was withdrawn, and said the statements could not have been withdrawn, without influencing the jury to have a prejudicial mind regarding the defendants. Judge Wilson ruled that all evidence would be withdrawn, and instructed the jury to rule out the evidence.

On the third day, Edson took the stand again and Sweetser told Wilson that if the evidence of the Springfield trip was to stay in the minds of the jury, and the defense was unable to give any instructions to the jury or contradict the testimony with evidence, then "I shall retire from this courthouse, for I can no longer benefit these defendants, if such a course is pursued." Wilson said he would rule as he ruled the day before. At that point, Sweetser left the court, and his role as Defense Attorney. He walked over to the nearby Mansion House. The jury, defendants, and the Bonds were surprised at this, and wondered if his leaving was legitimate or for dramatic effect. H.H. Bond went over to Mansion House, where he had a conversation with Sweetser, and then went back to the court. He said they would continue on the case without Sweetser.

D.W. Bond then cross-examined Edson, who talked about a background and said he had nothing to do with the Sixth Avenue robbery, and said that Dunlap and Scott told him they robbed it by themselves. The next witness was Albert Holt, who identified Dunlap and Scott as the men he saw on January 25 and 26, 1876, in Springfield. After Holt was Franklin, who talked about the day of Dunlap and Scott's arrest. Mrs. Whittlesey and Mrs. Page (who was at the Whittlesey house) were next, and both identified Dunlap and Scott as being at the house.

The next witnesses were called regarding Dunlap, Scott, and Edson's visit to Wilkes-Barre. Charles Schuler, clerk of the Wyoming Valley Hotel, says he likely witnessed Dunlap and Scott, and that one of them wrote the R.C. Hill signature. He also said that Edson paid 40 cents for a telegram from "Hill". Edson was recalled, and identified his signature and Dunlap's (as "Hill") on the hotel register. R.E. Jamison, telegraph operator at Wilkes-Barre, was called to exhibit several telegrams sent by unknown people from Wilkes-Barres on August 5, 1876. Edson was recalled again and asked to identify the signature on one of the telegrams, which he said belonged to Dunlap. This was objected and taken exception to. Then, the District Attorney read the "Come to-morrow" telegram.

The first trial lasted only a few days. The jury deliberated for two hours and came back with a guilty verdict. The second trial was much longer.

==== Trial 2 ====
The jury again found them guilty. They were sentenced to 20 years in prison each.

Scott eventually returned the securities to the bank in hopes of achieving leniency, but it was unsuccessful. $11,000 in cash was never recovered.

=== After the trial ===
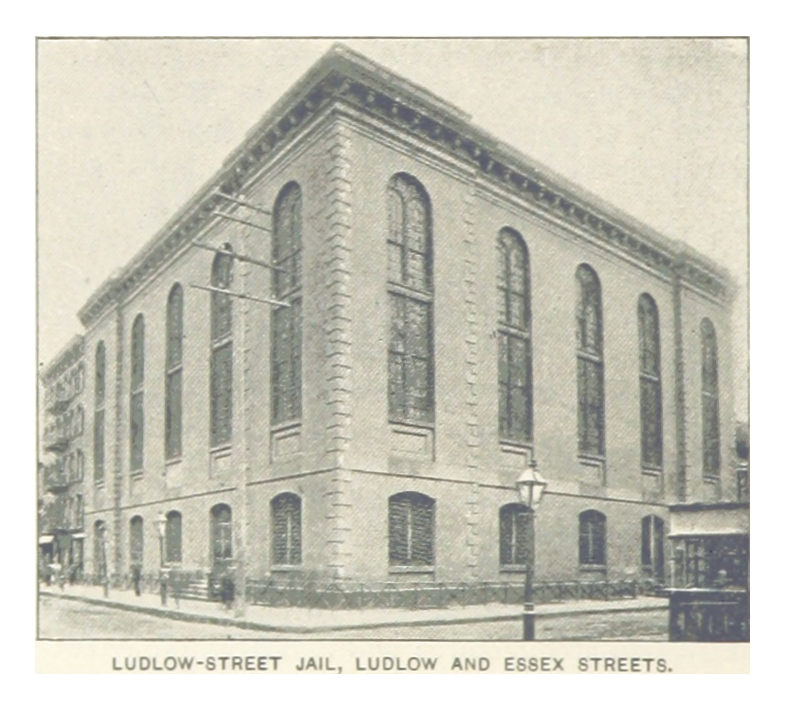
The Ludlow Street Jail in Manhattan, where Connors and Leary were held, and where both would escape from

Leslie went on to rob a bank in Dexter, Maine, in 1877, and the Manhattan Savings Institution on October 27, 1878. This led to the discovery and arrest of the culprits of the Northampton robbery. Leslie was implicated but never arrested.

Leary escaped rearrest in August 1877. He was finally caught, but then broke out of Ludlow in 1879. Friends of his had rented out a house adjoining the jail, and dug a hole through to a closet in the jail, and Leary crawled out. Scott died in prison in 1882. On February 14, 1889, Connors was arrested in Philadelphia and Leary was arrested in Brooklyn. He was sentenced to twenty years in an Ohio penitentiary. His cellmate was William Sydney Porter, convicted for bank embezzlement, who would eventually become a writer under the name O. Henry, and wrote some of his stories based on Connors. Dunlap campaigned for his pardon, and was finally pardoned and released in 1892.

== Legacy ==
In 2019, the building's owner commissioned a mural depicting the robbery. The artist is Ramiro Davaro-Comas, a former University of Massachusetts Amherst student. The bank building was previously owned by one of the creators of Teenage Mutant Ninja Turtles, Kevin Eastman, so the artist incorporated the four turtle characters into the mural design.

== See also ==
- List of bank robbers and robberies

== Sources ==
- Conway, J. North (2009). King of Heists: The Sensational Bank Robbery of 1878 That Shocked America. ISBN 978-1-49-304053-7
- Scott, Robert C. (1877). Trials of Scott and Dunlap for Robbing the Northampton National Bank and Breaking and Entering the Cashier's House. Gazette Printing Company. ISBN 9783337815905
- Walling, George W (1887). Recollections of a New York Chief of Police. Caxton book concern, limited. ISBN 978-0-60-835831-4
