= 1878 in organized crime =

== Events ==
- October 27: The Manhattan Savings Institution robbery is carried out by the gang of George Leonidas Leslie.

== Births ==
- Charles Reiser, American safecracker and mentor.
- February 18: Big Jim Colosimo, Italian-American Mafia crime boss.
