= Manhattan Savings Institution robbery =

1878 bank robbery in New York City

Coordinates: 40°43′36″N 73°59′45″W

- Manhattan Savings Bank robbery, New York City (The National Police Gazette, 1878)
- Date: October 27, 1878
- Location: Manhattan Savings Institution, Manhattan, New York City
- Perpetrator: Gang of George Leonidas Leslie
- Outcome: Bank robbery of $2,747,700

On Sunday, October 27, 1878, the Manhattan Savings Institution bank and depository in Manhattan, New York City was robbed of $2,747,700 ($82 million in 2025) in cash and securities by the former gang of serial bank robber George Leonidas Leslie. At the time, it was the largest-paying criminal heist in history.

The plan was formulated by Leslie three years prior to 1878, and planned by him and his gang. He broke into the bank three times to try and open the safe in March 1878, and finally opened the outer safe on March 15. After Leslie's gang failed to rob a bank in Maine in February, which led to the death of the bank's cashier, the gang became increasingly paranoid that Leslie would go to the police and give their names, and in response, Leslie tried to stall the robbery so he could pull it off with another gang. Leslie disappeared in March, and was found murdered in the woods near Yonkers on June 4. Police suspected it was done by the gang over the Maine incident. The gang did the bank robbery without Leslie, on October 27.

A janitor at the bank, Louis Werckle, said that on the 27th at 6:10 a.m., he was preparing for his shift when his apartment near the bank was broken into by multiple men. He was handcuffed, and compelled to give up the combination to the safe. The men entered the bank with keys received from a corroborator who worked as a night watchman at the bank, Patrick Shevlin. One of the largest investigations in the history of New York City occurred, and a series of informants led investigators to finding the culprits involved. They discovered that Leslie had been involved in most of the recent major bank robberies committed in the United States. Much of what was stolen was returned to the bank, as most of it was in the form of certificates that the robbers were unable to spend. $15,000 was never recovered.

== Background ==
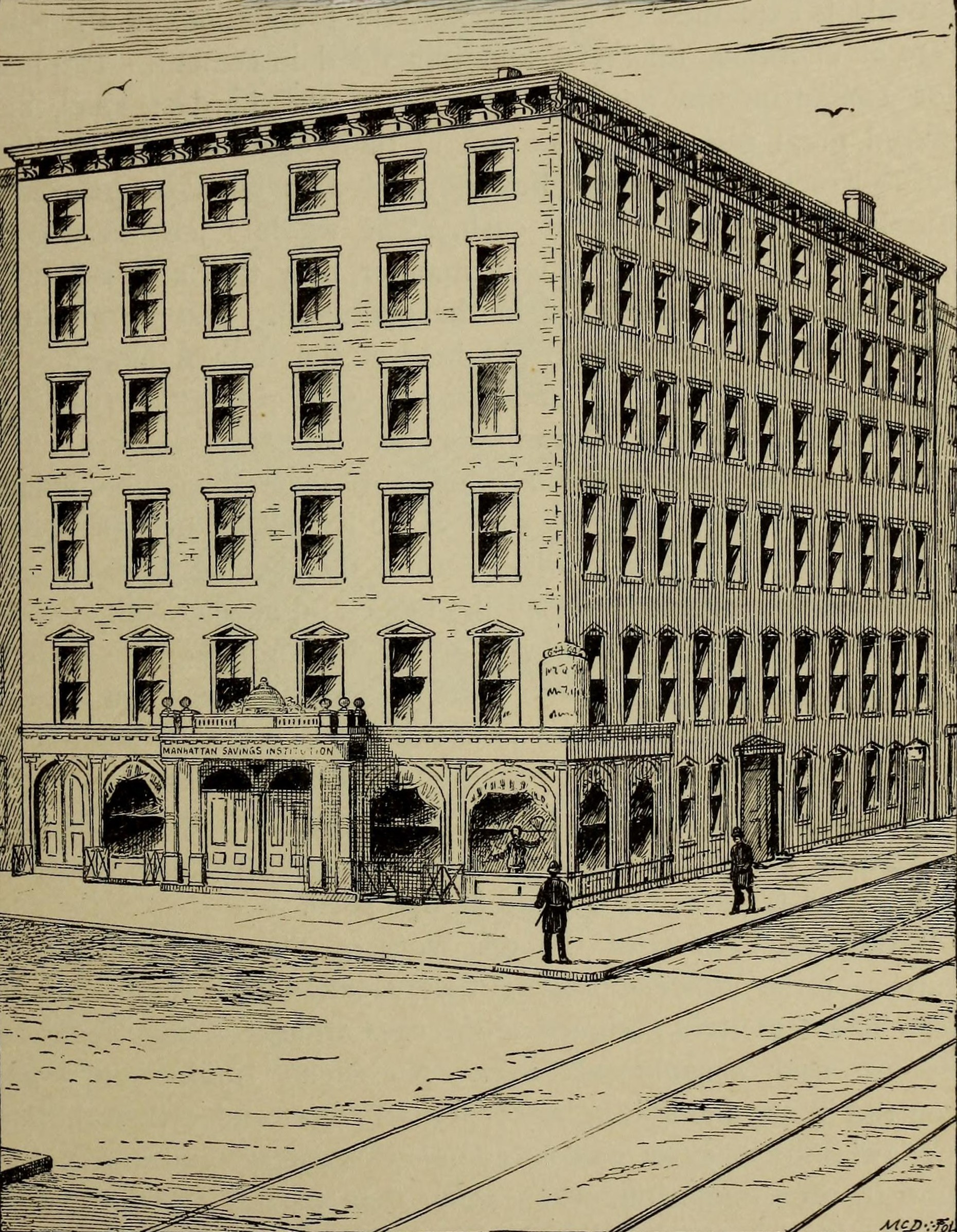
A black-and-white illustration of the Manhattan Bank Building in 1878. It is a six-story rectangular building, and each floor is wrapped around by a series of windows. The illustration shows two sides of the building, featuring both main entrances. Two people stand in front. The ground is covered with tracks for trolley cars.

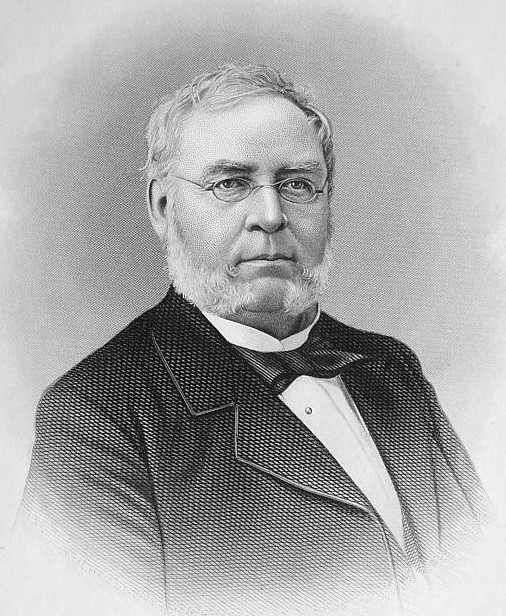
Edward Schell, the president of the Institution

The Manhattan Savings Institution was a bank and depository located in the Manhattan Bank Building, on the northeast corner of Broadway and Bleecker Street in Manhattan, New York City. In October 1878, its president was Edward Schell, who had acted as the bank's treasurer until the previous president resigned in May of that year. A statement on the condition of the bank dated January 1, 1878, said that their resources were worth $8.6 million, and its liabilities were $8.1 million, leaving a surplus of $500,000.

The building the bank occupied was six stories. The bank was located on the first floor, and a barber shop ran by a man named Mr. Kohlman was in the basement. The building had two entrances, one on Broadway and the other Bleecker Street. The bank, highly fortified, was used by some of New York City's wealthiest individuals, including Andrew Carnegie, Cornelius Vanderbilt, James Fisk Jr., Jay Gould, John D. Rockefeller, and Augustus Schell, brother of Edward Schell. Outside the vault room hung a large clock. Inside the room, the $40,000 iron safe was 12 feet long, 8 feet wide, and 8 feet tall. Packed on shelves next to the safe were books and tin boxes containing depositor's valuables.

George Leonidas Leslie was an architect, art patron, socialite, and bank robber who moved to New York City in 1869. In 1878, he lived on Greene Avenue in Brooklyn with his wife, Mary Henrietta. Law enforcement claimed he was involved in 80% of all bank robberies in the United States between 1869 and 1879, including the theft of $800,000 from Ocean National Bank in New York City in 1869, and the theft of $1.6 million from Northampton Bank in Massachusetts in 1876. He was introduced to the criminal world by Fredericka "Marm" Mandelbaum, a criminal fence to many of New York's street gangs. He would often become a depositor of the banks he robbed, and replicated the interiors of the banks in a warehouse so that his gang could meticulously practice the heists. He had a device called the "little joker" which could crack a safe's bank combination.

== Planning ==
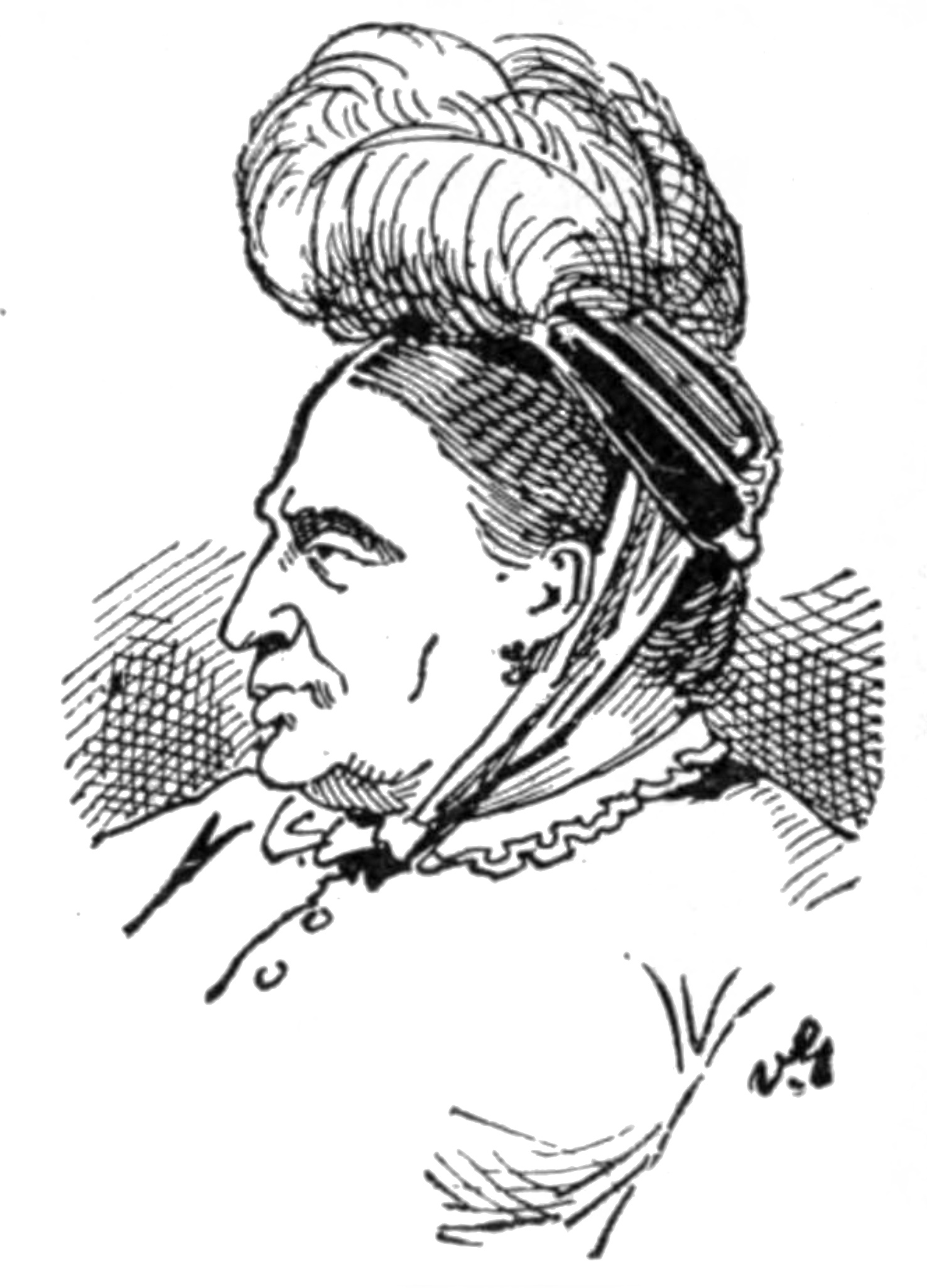
Fredericka Mandelbaum, who owned the warehouse where the robbery was practiced in

The robbery was formulated by Leslie three years prior to 1878, and planned over those three years. The planning initially involved at least Leslie, Billy Porter, Gilbert Yost, Johnny Irving, John "Red" Leary, and Thomas "Shang" Draper. Leslie surveyed the bank multiple times. A replica of the bank was constructed in one of Mandelbaum's warehouses in Brooklyn, where he rehearsed the robbery with his gang. Leslie drew architectural plans of the interior and exterior of the bank, and became in contact with Edward Schell, who Leslie knew from his time in high society. He also located and bribed a vault maker, and learned how to duplicate the bank's safe's combination lock. Using his contacts with the bank's president, Leslie got his associate Patrick Shevlin hired as a bank guard. Shevlin would let Leslie into the bank after hours during the planning. The gang also bribed a local police officer, John Nugent.

=== Leslie's fallout with the gang ===
On February 23, 1878, Leslie and a gang consisting of Draper, Irving, Leary, Porter, and Yost, attempted to rob the Dexter National Bank in Dexter, Maine. They had secured involvement from the bank's cashier, James Barron, who would give them the vault keys. When they arrived, Barron said he wouldn't give them the keys and that he wanted out. Draper and Leary cuffed his hands behind his back, gagged him, and wedged him between two of the vault doors, which Leslie tried to stop but failed. When the police found him the next day, he was dead. The Pinkertons launched an investigation.

After laying low in Philadelphia, Leslie returned to New York and met with Draper and Leary in a saloon in Brooklyn. The meeting turned violent, and Leary calmed things down. The men then discussed who would go to the police to save themselves. Leslie said Irving would, and Draper said that wouldn't happen. Later, Draper informed Irving what Leslie had said about him. Irving was furious and said he would find Leslie and kill him that day. Draper calmed him down, and said they should keep an eye on Leslie. Mandelbaum warned Leslie that she couldn't control them if their lives were in danger. Draper and Irving later told Leslie they would kill him if they found out he was working with the police or Pinkertons. Leslie thought that the gang, police, or Pinkertons would come for him eventually, and started making plans to protect himself.

Leslie stayed away from the gang except when planning the Institution robbery in Mandelbaum's warehouse. Leslie's nerves led him to the plan to pull off the Institution robbery by himself, which would mean double-crossing the gang and Mandelbaum. He decided to soon contact John "Traveling Mike" Grady, Mandelbaum's biggest rival. He would give Grady a percentage of the stolen profits.

=== March break-in attempts ===
Leslie broke into the bank three times in early March. On his first break-in, Leslie tried to use the little joker, but was unsuccessful. He drilled a hole through the safe's dial indicator, and slipped a small wire into the gears to throw off the combination indicators out of gear. Leslie worked over the night and was unable to crack the combination. Minutes before the bank opened in the morning, Leslie puttied up the hole he drilled and left; his tampering with the dial made it impossible for the bank to open the safe. They thought the tumblers had malfunctioned, and installed a new one, which forced Leslie to start over again.

On the second time, Leslie and Leary broke into the bank with the help of Patrick Shevlin. During this time, a police officer looked into the darkened lobby, and spotted Red Leary cleaning with a feather duster. Leary gave the officer a thumbs up, and the officer left. Because of this, Leslie and Leary left.

On March 15, Gilbert let Leslie and Yost into the bank to break in for a third time. Leslie pried the dial knob off the safe and inserted the little joker. This version of the device did not need to wait for someone to use the combination, because spinning the knob would reveal the tumblers and thus, the combination numbers. He replaced the dial, and gave the numbers, 80, 9, and 25, to Yost. Yost tried a series of numbers until he opened the safe. Leslie convinced Yost and later, others, to hold off on the robbery until the spring, when there would be more money and securities locked in the vault. In actuality, Leslie planned to use the time to rob the bank with another gang that Grady provided him, not with Draper, Irving, Leary, Porter, or Yost.

=== Leslie's attempt at switching gangs ===
In early April, Leslie contacted Grady, who gave him one of his top men as a bodyguard, Johnny Walsh. In late April, Leslie went back to Philadelphia to be with Molly. Leslie told Molly he would retire from the revenue service (his story to avoid mentioning his criminal career), because he had made dangerous enemies. His wife told him to contact the police or Pinkertons; Leslie said he had contacted the Pinkertons and that they gave him a bodyguard. He told her that he had one last thing to attend to in New York, and that he would return in late May. Leslie planned to take the money from the robbery, and move out west with Molly. It was the last time that Molly saw him. Leslie returned from Philadelphia in late May, and went about his business as normal at his Greene Avenue cottage, with Walsh by his side. Mandelbaum pressured Leslie for a date for the robbery, but he kept stalling.

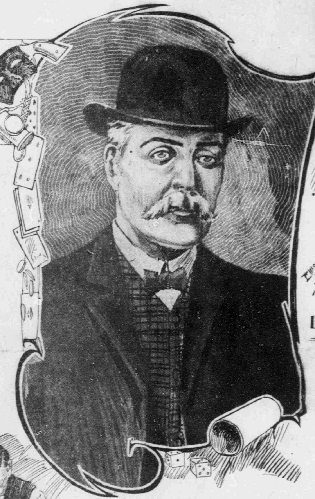
Thomas "Shang" Draper, Leslie's associate who discovered Leslie was having an affair with his wife, Babe

Mandelbaum failed to make things calm within the gang. She told the gang, excluding Leslie, that they should take back their threats towards him and make amends, because Leslie would not talk with the police. Draper and Irving were unconvinced. Draper was personally stunted by rumors of Leslie's affair with his wife, Babe. At some point, he found evidence of the affair. Leslie found out Draper had beaten Babe, so he gave her a pistol to protect herself.

=== Leslie's disappearance and death ===
On the night of May 29, 1878, Leslie stopped in at Murphy's Saloon in Brooklyn. Someone in the saloon delivered Leslie an envelope. Inside was a letter containing the handwriting of Babe. She said Shang had found out about the affair Leslie had been having with Babe, and that he should leave the city with her before Shang caught him. She said she would be waiting at her house on Halsey Street in Brooklyn. Leslie tore up the note, and asked a man named Walsh to hail him a cab. He told Walsh not to follow him, and that he would be safe. Leslie told the cab driver to go to Halsey Street, and Walsh watched him go.

On June 4, the body of Leslie, 41, was found three miles from Yonkers. He had been shot once in the head and once in the heart. Resting on his body was a pistol, which was later identified as the murder weapon. It was Leslie's gun that he had given Babe Draper to protect herself with. Evidence suggested that he was murdered at another location, and then transported to Tramp's Rock while hidden in a wagon's hay. After investigating, the police theorized that Leslie was killed by members of his gang over the Dexter incident. They concluded Leslie had been murdered either in or near Draper's home in Brooklyn, and that the body was then taken to near Yonkers. No one was ever charged for his murder. The gang then continued planning the robbery without him. At some point, multiple other people entered the robbery crew, including Patrick Shevlin (a night watchman at the bank), Patrick Schoolin, Henry Glean, William Kelly, Jim Dunlap, and Oscar Decker.

== Robbery ==
Cashier Louis Werckle being interrogated by a robber during the event (1887 illustration)

On the 26th, Saturday, the bank's night watchman Daniel Keaney went on duty at 6 p.m., when he locked the doors and stayed at the bank all night, according to his account. At 6 a.m. on the 27th, Keaney turned off the building's gas lights, left the Bleecker Street entrance, locked the door behind him, and walked on over to the apartment building where Werckle was living. The two men had their own keys to the building. He knocked on Werckle's door, a sign that they were changing shifts. At the end of Werckle's shift, he was supposed to be relieved by Shevlin. Werckle answered Keaney by knocking on the other side of the door, and then went to change his clothes. Keaney then stood outside the apartment for ten minutes, not noticing anything suspicious.

In Werckle's account, he was putting on clothes, when the door to his sitting-room was noiselessly opened, and seven or eight men wearing masks walked in. Louis' wife, Mrs. Werckle, corroborates this account, but says the number of robbers was five. When the robbers confessed, they said the number was four. Mrs. Werckle said she was awake many times during the night and heard no suspicious noises in the building. The men handcuffed Louis and his wife, and tied his mother-in-law to the bed in a sheet. The women shouted, and Louis told them to keep quiet or else the robbers would kill them. One man took Louis' keys, and another put a gun to his head and asked him for the lock combination. He initially told the men he didn't have it, and when they threatened to kill him, he eventually gave it up. Four of the men went downstairs and the others stayed to watch the family.

A lithographer who worked on the third floor said he used the Bleecker Street entrance to go upstairs at or after 6 a.m., and found the door was open. Officer Van Orden had a beat at that section of Bleecker Street from 6 to 8; he said that around 6:20, he looked inside the bank and saw nothing suspicious.

The men entered the Bleecker Street entrance with the keys they received from Werckle, then locked it from the inside. The bank could have been dark enough after Keaney turned off the lights that an intrusion into the vault could have gone unnoticed. Inside the main safe were four inner safes, two made by the company Lilly, and two made by Valentine & Butler. Two burglars likely shut the bank vault and worked on opening the safes and the tin boxes. while one stayed outside and kept watch while pretending to dust the shelves. Officer Kent, who had a beat on Broadway from 6 to 8, looked inside the bank and saw the man dusting. The safes made by Lilly were opened, and those made by Valentine & Butler were not. One of the opened safes contained cash and the other had United States bonds and other securities. One of the unopened safes contained bonds and mortgages and the other was the safe of Edward Schell, filled with securities and other valuables.

In Kohlman's account, he looked into the bank from the building corner a few minutes before 7. He took out his watch and compared it to the clock above the vault, though he didn't remember the exact time. He then went downstairs to the barbershop, and read the newspaper until a customer arrived at 8:30. He said he didn't hear any footsteps in that time. Werckle could hear the front door being forced off, but nobody else on the street or at the St. Charles Hotel next door heard the noise. Kohlman could not hear the noise from below because the foundation of the vault room was of "enormous thickness" and made of cement.

Inside, they took books off the shelves and laid them on the floor in front of the safe. The main safe door was wrenched off its hinges and laid on the books, as to deafen the sound of it hitting the floor. A chisel was left sticking out of the inner wall of the main safe near one of the unopened inner safes. Twenty of the tin boxes containing depositors' valuables were cracked open, and some of their valuables were left lying about. The workman's kit was also left on the floor. They hurried their theft, and in the process, left the chisel inside, and the boxes and workman's kit on the ground. Shevlin was bound and gagged as to divert suspicion of his involvement.

Werckle said that after a "long time" waiting in his apartment, there was a pounding from below, and then one or two of the robbery came back upstairs and inside. They all whispered to each other and left. Mrs. Werckle said the time between when the men arrived and left was three to four hours. After the men left, Werckle remained quiet for 10 to 20 minutes, then looked out his window facing the Bleecker Street entrance and saw nobody at the bank. He then ran downstairs. A police officer eventually uncuffed Mrs. Werckle. Kohlman said he heard the vault clock strike 9, and then, twenty minutes later, Werckle came in with his hands still cuffed. Werckle said, "The bank's been robbed!" The two went upstairs to find the vault open. The police were notified.

The amount of money stolen was $2,747,700, which equals $65 million in 2017 dollars. $2,506,700 of it were registered bonds, $241,000 were coupon bonds, and $12,764 was cash. At the time, it was the largest-paying criminal heist in history.

== Aftermath ==
The bank's Vice President McLean, Secretary Alvord, and a group of clerks went to the bank to prepare a statement of losses. One of the pilfered boxes was Alvord's. The bank put out a statement that night saying no payment be made to the bank without 60 days' notice, as not to prevent loss to depositors.

One of the largest investigations in the history of New York City then started. Werckle and Keaney were arrested, though they were not considered suspects and were released later that night. A police presence was established at the bank to investigate and hold off onlookers. A consultation was held at the Fifteenth Precinct Police Station at 11 p.m. that night, and afterwards, the force's "best detectives" were sent to scour the city. Police said they had an immediate suspect, but would not disclose their name.

Shevlin received $1,639 for his involvement, which was left for him at a liquor store on the corner of Avenue C and 7th Street. A bartender at the liquor store named Patrick Ryan was suspected of having received money. Shevlin gave $600 back to Kelly, for the purposes of hiring a lawyer to go to Washington D.C. to prevent the passage of a Congressional bill which authorized the issuance of new United States bonds to replace those which were stolen. The lawyer was unsuccessful.

The case had stumped police for months, but investigators were led to all the culprits involved. Some criminals who were rivals of Leslie's acted as informants. Shevlin eventually confessed to his role, which led to the arrest of Johnny Hope, son of bank robber Jimmy Hope, on February 11, 1879. In May, the police heard that Nugent had been bragging about being involved in the robbery. Nugent was arrested, and Shevlin testified against him during his trial. In June 1879, Glean, Jimmy Hope, Schoolin, Shevlin, and Kelly were arrested and charged with robbery. Abe Coakley and Emerson were arrested later. Ryan was arrested but was not convicted. Hope and Kelly were convicted. Nugent was acquitted, allegedly because he bribed one of the jurors, and was later convicted in Hoboken of highway robbery. Investigators discovered that Leslie had been involved in most of the recent major bank robberies committed in the United States.

Much of what was stolen was returned to the bank, as most of it was in the form of certificates that the robbers were unable to spend. $12,000 of it was in cash, and the rest was in securities. $15,000 was never recovered.

== See also ==
- List of bank robbers and robberies

== Sources ==
- Conway, J. North. (2009) King of Heists: The Sensational Bank Robbery of 1878 That Shocked America. ISBN 978-1-49-304053-7
- Walling, George W. (1887) Recollections of a New York Chief of Police. Caxton book concern, limited. ISBN 978-0-60-835831-4
