= Yellow Henry Gang =

The Yellow Henry Gang was a 19th-century New Orleans street gang during the early 1870s and late 1880s.

A particularly violent gang in the underworld of New Orleans, the gang was largely made up of thieves and murderers. Originally led by a man known only as Turpo, the gang was taken over by "Yellow" Henry Stewart following Turpo's arrest in 1877 and imprisonment for murder. Henry had long suffered from malaria, which had tinted his skin yellow, hence his nickname.

Under Henry's leadership, the gang reached its peak following a number of successful burglaries, armed robberies and extortions. The gang attracted many of the city's prominent criminals, including expert garroters Joseph Martin and Crooked Neck Delaney, Charles "Prussian Charley" Mader, George Sylvester, Garibaldi Bolden, murderers Red and Blue Haley, Pat Keeley and cop killer Frank Lyons.

In 1884, Henry was arrested for robbery along with three other gang members. He died of malaria in prison in July 1886.

The gang was briefly reformed in 1888, following the escape of Frank Lyons. However, he was quickly arrested and returned to prison. Lyons was pardoned by Louisiana Governor Francis T. Nicholls in 1890, and resumed criminal activities with the gang until 1892, when New Orleans police arrested him for the murder of a police officer. He was sentenced to life imprisonment, and the Yellow Henrys soon disbanded.
