= Live Oak Boys =

Irish-American street gang

The Live Oak Boys was an Irish-American street gang who dominated New Orleans throughout the 1860s and 70s.

Led by "Red" Bill Wilson, the Live Oak Boys were formed in 1858. Their name derived from the oaken clubs that were their weapon of choice. They were less well-organized than similar Irish mob families in the Five Points and Live Oak Boys often kept for themselves whatever money or goods they could steal. This often led to infighting among the group's members; the stealing of each other's loot and at times even killings of other members, such as the 1867 murder of Henry Thompson by Jimmy O'Brien.

Based on Gallatin Street, the gang would be hired out by seemingly respectable businessmen during the Gilded Age to commit assault, arson, and other acts of vandalism against competitors. Dance halls were frequent targets, the Fireproof Coffee-House being one popular dance hall hangout owned by former gang member Bill Swan.

The gang continued to dominate New Orleans for more than a decade. However, many members were eventually killed or imprisoned during the 1870s, and by 1880 the gang had declined to the point where they were often persecuted by younger members of other New Orleans gangs. The Live Oak Boys disappeared shortly after.
