= Johnny Walsh (gang member) =

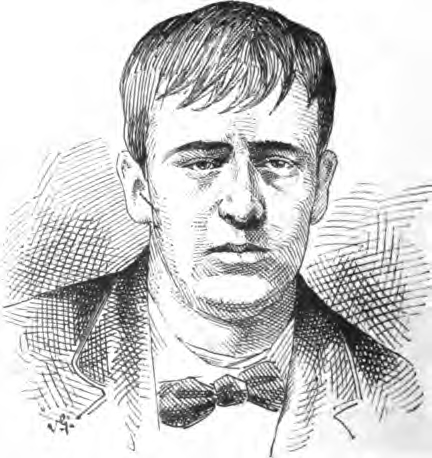
- Born: John S. Walsh; February 8, 1852
- Died: October 16, 1883 (aged 31); Manhattan, New York
- Cause of death: Murdered
- Other names: John S. Walch; Johnny the Mick; Jonnie the Mick
- Occupation: Criminal
- Known for: New York gang leader and founder of the Walsh Gang.

John "Johnny the Mick" Walsh (February 8, 1852 – October 16, 1883) was an early New York City gangster and leader of the Walsh Gang. Forming the Walshers in the late 1870s, Walsh's violent tactics would dominate the Bowery in several years. Walsh would soon become involved in what would become a long a bitter feud with Johnny Irving's Dutch Mob during the early 1880s as the two fought over the Bowery. On three occasions, the two gang leaders fought each other in knife fights although these proved inconclusive. The police refused to interfere in the gang war, as was general policy at the time, preferring to allow the gangs to wipe each other out.

The final showdown between Walsh and Irving occurred on October 16, 1883, when, as Walsh was drinking in Shang Draper's saloon on Sixth Avenue, Irving and Billy Porter entered and confronted Walsh. After an altercation between the two, Walsh shot and killed Irving. Porter in turn killed Walsh and was then shot by Draper. Although Porter survived, neither he nor Draper were charged with either Walsh or Irving's death.
