= Mike McGloin =

American gangster and convicted murderer

Michael E. "Mike" McGloin
- Born: c. 1862
- Died: March 9, 1883; New York, New York
- Status: Deceased
- Conviction: Murder
- Penalty: Death by hanging

Michael E. "Mike" McGloin (c. 1862 – March 9, 1883) was a 19th-century criminal and leader of the Whyos, a New York City street gang.

== Overview ==
An early member of the Whyos, McGloin would rise to become leader of the gang by the late 1870s, in his late teens. Continuing the ruthless tactics of his predecessors "Dandy" Jim Dolan, Piker Ryan and others of the previous decade, McGloin terrorized New York's Westside, particularly Hell's Kitchen throughout the late 1870s. On the night of December 29, 1881, four members of the Whyos (presumably including McGloin) entered a local Hell's Kitchen tavern owned by Louis Hanier. As one of the men asked to change a $10 bill, another man suddenly became ill and tried to get behind the bar. Asking the men to leave, there was no further incident until around midnight when Hanier closed the bar and went upstairs to bed. Sometime around 2:00 am, Hanier's wife reported hearing noises coming from downstairs. When Hanier attempted to investigate, he was shot and killed by an unidentified gunman.

Led by NYPD police superintendent Inspector Thomas F. Byrnes, police investigation was able to trace the murder weapon, a .38 caliber pistol, to a pawn shop on Ninth Avenue, which had previously been owned by McGloin. However attempts to gain further evidence against him, including assigning a woman to live with the 19-year-old gang leader in the hopes of gaining a confession, proved fruitless as further attempts proved inconclusive.

Byrnes, accompanied by Captain Williams and six other officers, raided the Whyos headquarters, arresting gang members Thomas Moran, Frederick Banfield and Robert Morrissey on January 31, 1882. McGloin, convinced that the other members would testify against him, admitted to breaking into the tavern and killing Hanier; however, he claimed self-defense, believing Hanier was armed.

On March 1, McGloin was tried alongside Moran and Morrissey and, after eleven minutes of discussion among the jury, McGloin was convicted by the General Sessions of first degree murder and sentenced to death while Moran and Morrissey received eight years imprisonment for burglary. Despite being granted a stay of execution after several pleas for appeal, McGloin was hanged in The Tombs on March 9, 1883.

== See also ==
- Capital punishment in New York (state)
- Capital punishment in the United States
- List of people executed in New York

== General references ==
- Asbury, Herbert. The Gangs of New York. New York: Alfred A. Knoff, 1926.
- Sifakis, Carl. The Encyclopedia of American Crime. New York: Facts On File Inc., 1982.
- Barton, George. True Exploits of Famous Detectives (True Stories of Celebrated Crimes), New York: McKinley Stone & MacKensie, 1909.
- Carey, Arthur A. Memoirs of a Murder Man. Garden City, New York: Doubleday, Doran and Co., 1930.
