= 1876 in organized crime =

== Events ==
- The NYPD launches its campaign against the river pirates and street gangs along the New York waterfront with the formation of the "Steamboat Squad".
- Extortion activities by the Black Hand are first reported within Italian-American communities in St. Louis, Missouri.
- January 16 – John Murray and James Briston, members of a burglary gang based on Joiner Street, are arrested in the Bunker Hill district by officers of the First Police Precinct. Among half a dozen burglary and theft charges against them, Briston is additionally charged with breaking and entering in connection to a robbery of Robert's & Webster, a store on Blackstone Street, during the night of December 1. Two other members, Young and Manning, had been previously arrested on similar charges and sentenced to eight years at New York State Prison.

== Births ==
- George Remus, Chicago organized crime figure and bootlegger.
- Paul Kelly (Paul Vaccarelli), New York organized crime figure and founder of the Five Points Gang.
