= 1870 in organized crime =

In 1870, a number of events took place in organized crime.

== Events ==
- January 1 – German immigrant John Merkle is beaten to death in front of his home by several members of the Tenth Avenue Gang. Patrick Fitzpatrick and James Strang are eventually arrested in connection with the murder and tried at the Jefferson Market Street Court on February 25.
- January 5 – James Logan, a prominent member of the Nineteenth Street Gang, is shot and killed by former associate Jerry Dunn after becoming involved in an argument at the West Houston Street coffee and cake saloon Johnny and Harry's. Logan, who had been drinking with his mistress Carrie Smith, confronted Dunn and several others after making crude remarks toward Smith. As the two walked outside to settle the matter in the streets, Dunn fired a derringer pistol as Logan exited the saloon. A police officer responding to the gunshot initially held Logan in custody although, prompted by claims by Dunn's friends that the shooter had fled into the saloon, he released Dunn who quickly made his escape. Mortally wounded, Logan remained incapacitated as he was taken to the Prince Street Police Station and then later to Bellevue Hospital where he died from his wound. Dunn was eventually identified after police detaining Smith, Minnie Wilson and John W. Cook for questioning as well as finding the murder weapon which Dunn had dropped onto the street during his escape.
- April 10 – After arresting Thomas H. Quinn for being drunk and disorderly, police officers Greer and See are followed by members of the Nineteenth Street Gang who harass the officers throwing stones and other objects (Officer See suffering a serious head injury after being struck by a large paving stone). Although a crowd of nearly 200 had gathered, a detachment from the 29th Precinct arrived and escorted both the officers and the prisoner back to the station house.
