= Gilbert Yost =

American criminal from New York (d. 1886)

Gilbert Yost (died July 10, 1886) was a New York criminal and burglar associated with George Leslie and later the Dutch Mob. He was arrested with Leslie after robbing a jewelry store in Norristown, Pennsylvania in 1870 and, while Leslie was able to use his political connections in Philadelphia to secure his release on bail which he forfeited after fleeing the city, Yost was convicted and sentenced to two years imprisonment.

Yost, along with Billy Porter and Johnny Irving, was arrested in Brooklyn on August 11, 1878 while at Porter's Patchen Avenue home and charged with the burglary Martin Ibert's Sons' flour and grain store on Graham Avenue the previous day.

He was eventually convicted for the robbery of a jewelry store in La Porte, Indiana on April 25, 1883 and died while serving a fourteen-year prison term in a Northern Indiana State Prison at Michigan City, Indiana on July 10, 1886.

== See also ==
- List of bank robbers and robberies
