= Dutch Mob =

Gang of pickpockets in 19th-century New York

The Dutch Mob was a New York pickpocket gang during the late nineteenth century.

Formed during the late 1860s by Little Freddie, "Sheeny" Mike Kurtz, and Johnny Irving, former members of the Italian Dave Gang, the Dutch Mob soon became one of the largest pickpocket gangs in the United States numbering around 300 members. Operating in the Manhattan neighborhood east of the Bowery, the area between Houston and Fifth Streets was known as a "pickpockets paradise" to the local press. A common tactic of the gang was to stage a street fight and pickpocket the gathering crowd. A variation of this technique was to have several gang members pick a fight with a victim where he would be "rescued" by other gang members posing as innocent bystanders and have his pockets picked while being rushed through the crowd.

However, when Anthony J. Allaire was appointed precinct captain in 1877, police "flying squads" were sent to clear the district attacking anyone who was suspected or resembled a pickpocket or other criminal and by the end of the year few members of the gang remained.

The same area would become home to another gang of mostly teenaged pickpockets, the Crazy Butch Gang, in the late-1890s.

== Members ==
=== Mike Kurtz ===
One of the founding members, "Sheeny" Mike Kurtz (or Mike Whelan) jointly ruled the gang along with Little Freddie and Johnny Irving during the 1870s. He was eventually imprisoned at Clinton Prison and sentenced to 18 years and 6 months on March 30, 1880, although he was possibly later released on appeal. He would later have a successful career as a bank robber and jewelry thief with Irving during the 1880s and 90s before his death in New York.

In 1894, Kurtz was arrested with "Dutch" Fred Ryder and ex-policeman Michael Malone in connection with the robbery of the Albert J. Knoll's Jersey Street saloon in Elizabethtown, New Jersey on April 2, 1894. The three burglars agreed to turn state's evidence against David McAdams, sportsman and manager of the Red Jacket Hotel, who they claimed arranged the robbery and hired them to rob the hotel in exchange for a percentage of the expected $800 in cash.

=== Johnny Irving ===
Johnny Irving (b. 1844–1883) lead the gang along with Mike Kurtz and Little Freddie and had a successful burglary career with Billy Porter during the 1870s and 80s.

In August 1878, he and Porter were arrested on suspicion of robbing a Williamsburg dry goods store of $4,000 the previous month, however police were forced to release the two due to lack of evidence. After being under police surveillance, police were able to gain sufficient evidence after finding stolen silk and jewelry as well as burglar's tools and a combination safelock.

Shortly after his arrest, the recovered evidence was linked to a recent robbery of a local flour merchant who confirmed that torn up checks and a safe drawer found at Irving's home were those stolen from his store.

The following year, Irving and Porter escaped from Raymondstreet Jail after their arrest for the robbery of National Bank of Northampton. While Porter was arrested shortly after their escape, Irving remained on the run for almost six years until his arrest in Lawrence, Massachusetts on March 3, 1884.

Irving was eventually killed by rival Johnny Walsh during a gunfight at a Sixth Avenue saloon owned by Thomas "Shang" Draper on October 19, 1883. Walsh was also killed during the gunfight. Porter was charged in his death, but acquitted.
