= Thomas Draper (criminal) =

American professional criminal

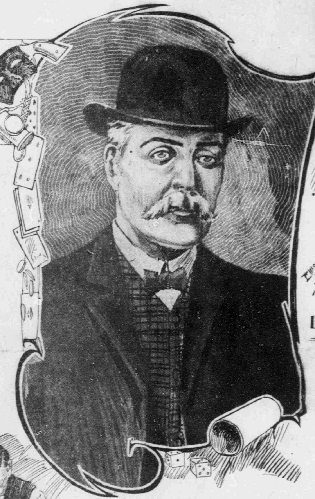
- Etching from 1907
- Born: c. 1839
- Died: December 1913 (aged 73–74); New York City, U.S.
- Other names: Shang Draper
- Occupation(s): shanghaier, criminal gang leader, saloon keeper
- Employer: self-employed
- Known for: Being a New York City waterfront shanghaier.

Thomas "Shang" Draper (c. 1839–1913) was a criminal shanghaier, saloon keeper, and criminal gang leader in New York City along the city waterfront. Working with George Leonidas Leslie, he was involved in the 1869 Ocean National Bank robbery, the 1876 Northampton Bank robbery, and the 1878 Manhattan Savings Institution robbery.

== Criminal career ==
Shang Draper ran a waterfront saloon in his native New York City, where he performed a confidence scam using an underage girl to lure a mark to a dark hotel room (which Draper owned) only to rob him. Draper acquired his distinctive nickname "Shang" from the "shanghaiing" trick he used to play on his unsuspecting patrons. Draper would drug a bar patron with laudanum and by the time the fellow awoke, he would have been pressed into merchant marine or naval service, sometimes for a foreign land.

Draper was a contemporary of Frederika Mandelbaum, a notorious gangleader in her own right, also based in his native New York City. Mandlebaum installed Draper, one of her trusted lieutenants, in a bank robbery gang fronted by George Leslie. They robbed the Manhattan Savings Institution on October 27, 1878.

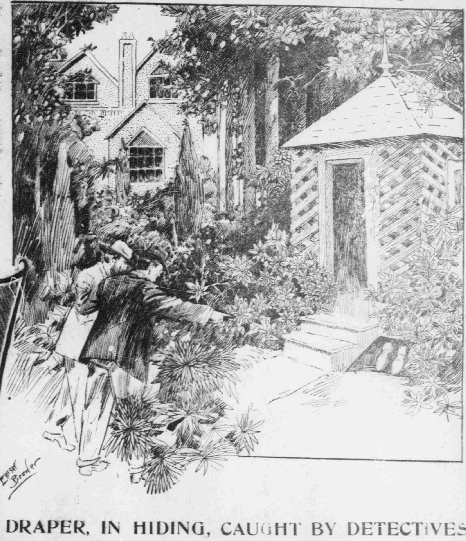
Thomas Murphy of the Brooklyn Police spots Draper hiding in a pile of rubbish at a summer house on Patchen Avenue.

In 1883, a shootout in Draper's saloon caused the deaths of gangsters Johnny Walsh and Johnny Irving.

== Death ==
Thomas Draper died in December 1913 in New York City.

== See also ==
- List of bank robbers and robberies
