= Thomas F. Byrnes =

Irish-born New York City firefighter, police officer and detective

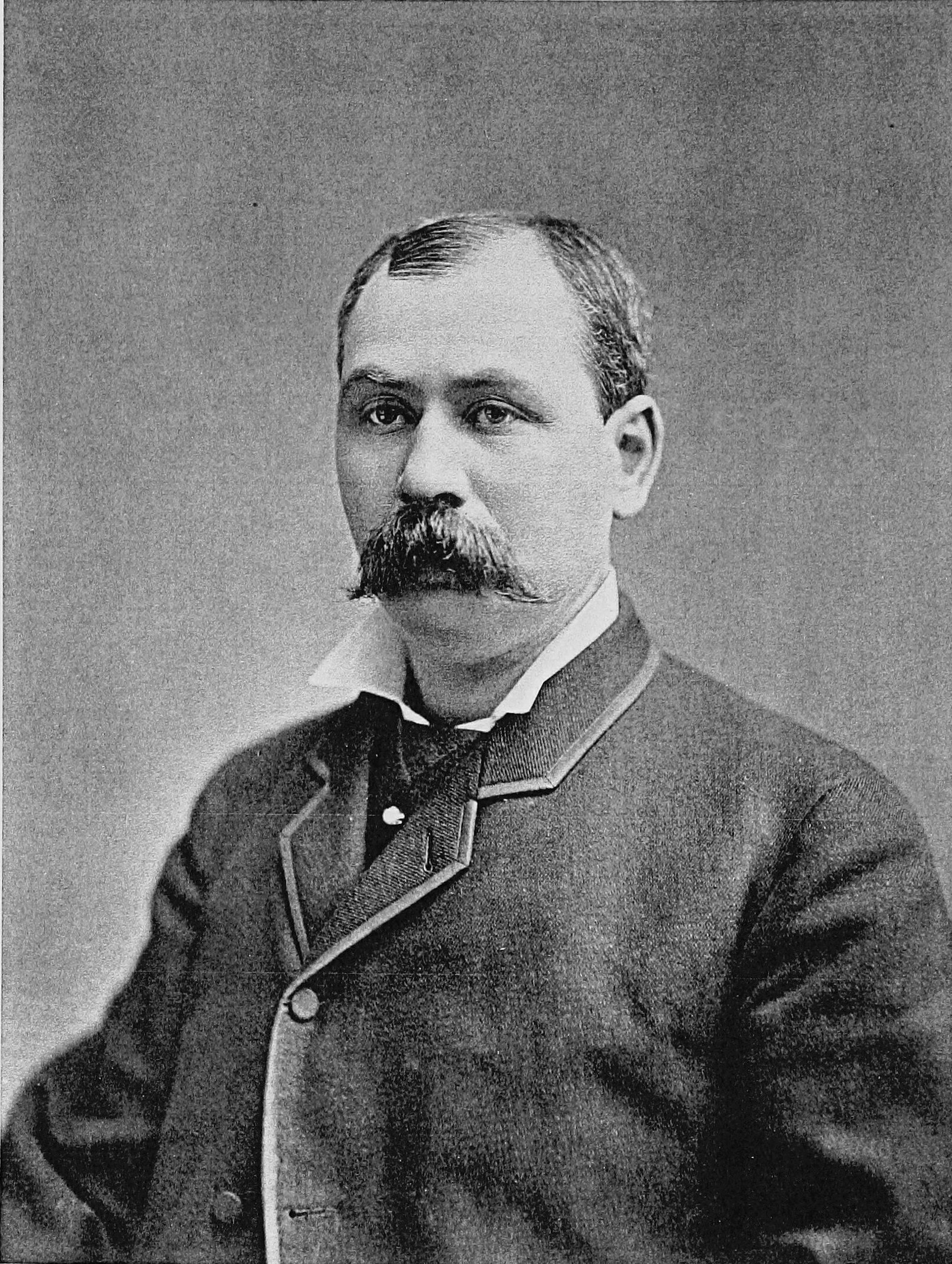
- Photograph of Byrnes published in his 1886 book Professional Criminals of America
- Born: June 15, 1842; Dublin, Ireland
- Died: May 7, 1910 (aged 67); Manhattan, New York City, U.S.

Thomas F. Byrnes (June 15, 1842 – May 7, 1910) was an Irish-born American police officer, who served as head of the New York City Police Department detective department from 1880 until 1895, who popularized the terms "rogues' gallery" and "third degree".

== Biography ==
Born in Dublin, Ireland to James and Rose Byrnes, he immigrated to New York City as a child. He worked as a skilled gas-fitter until the start of the U.S. Civil War. He enlisted with Elmer E. Ellsworth's "Zouaves" in 1861 and served two years with that unit. After his service, Byrnes became a firefighter, joining Hose Company No. 21 in New York City. He remained as a firefighter until December 10, 1863, when he was appointed a police officer.

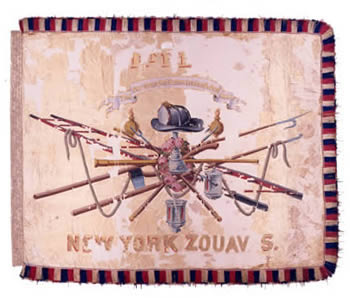
Insignia of Byrnes' regiment, the 11th N.Y (1861)

Byrnes rose in the ranks, first as a patrolman, then becoming a sergeant in 1869 and a captain in 1870. He gained renown through solving the Manhattan Savings Bank robbery of 1878. He became Detective Bureau chief in 1880. As inspector, Byrnes quickly won national distinction. He increased the detective force from 28 to 40 men. In four years it made 3,300 arrests. In 1882, he obtained legislative approval of changes in the department which gave him immense power. In 1886, Byrnes instituted the "Mulberry Street Morning Parade" of arrested suspects before the assembled detectives in the hope they would recognize suspects and link them to more crimes. Also that year, his book Professional Criminals of America was published. He built up a book of photographs of criminals, which he called the "Rogues' Gallery".

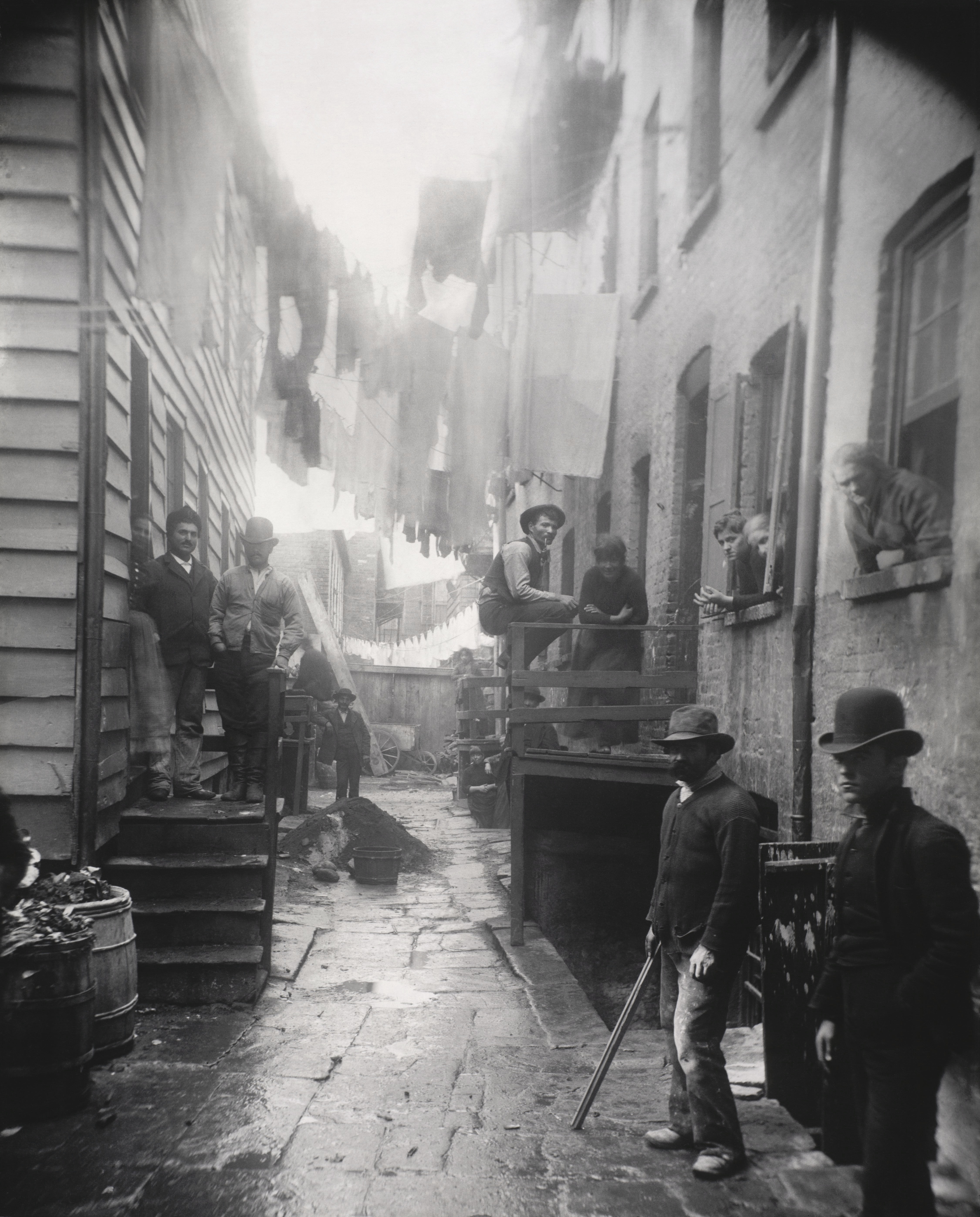
Bandit's Roost, a Mulberry Street back alley, photographed by Jacob Riis in 1888. An example of the jurisdiction Byrnes was tasked with policing.

Byrnes was one of the people who popularized the third degree due to his brutal questioning of suspected criminals. From the descriptions, the third degree as practiced by Byrnes was a combination of physical and psychological torture. Byrnes's techniques were popularized in a series of novels by his friend Julian Hawthorne, son of novelist Nathaniel Hawthorne, including The Great Bank Robbery, An American Penman, and A Tragic Mystery in 1887 and Section 558 and Another's Crime in 1888. Jacob A. Riis, who as police reporter for the New York Sun knew Byrnes well, declared that he was "a great actor", and hence a great detective. Riis called him an unscrupulous "big policeman" and a veritable giant in his time.

In 1891, three years after publicly criticizing London police officials on the way they handled the Jack the Ripper investigations, Byrnes was faced with a similar crime in New York. Amid mammoth publicity, Byrnes accused an Algerian, Ameer Ben Ali (nicknamed Frenchy) of the crime. He was convicted despite the evidence against him being doubtful, but pardoned eleven years later. Byrnes also successfully obtained a confession from gang leader Mike McGloin, who was convicted and executed for the murder of a tavern-owner during a robbery.

In 1895, the new president of the New York City Police Commission, future President of the United States Theodore Roosevelt, compelled him to resign as part of Roosevelt's drive to rid the force of corruption. In later life, Byrnes became an insurance investigator, opening a detective agency on Wall Street.

The television documentary Secrets of New York episode of October 22, 2013, credis Byrnes as "a man who invented America's modern detective bureau."

== Death ==
Thomas Byrnes died on May 7, 1910, at 9 o'clock at his home, 318 West Seventy-seventh Street, of stomach cancer. He was surrounded by his wife Ophelia and five daughters. His funeral was held at the Church of the Blessed Sacrament at Broadway and Seventy-first Street in Manhattan, New York City.

== In fiction ==
- Julian Hawthorne's series of five novels between 1887 and 1888 were collectively called From the Diaries of Inspector Byrnes
- Byrnes was featured as a fictional character in Jack Finney's time travel novel, Time and Again.
- In addition, he was a character in the juvenile detective series, Broadway Billy, as well as a number of other detective "dime novels".
- His name appeared as the author on the fictional turn-of-the-century true-crime novel The Bone Collector, which was featured in the film of the same name.
- Byrnes also appeared in Caleb Carr's novel The Alienist. In the television adaptation, he is portrayed by Ted Levine.
- Byrnes appeared as a character in Rick Yancey's The Curse of the Wendigo.
- Byrnes appeared in issues 696 to 699 of italian comic book series Tex.
