= Gangs of New York (disambiguation) =

Gangs of New York is a 2002 historical film inspired by Asbury's book, directed by Martin Scorsese.

Gangs of New York may also refer to:

- Gangs of New York (1938 film), an American film directed by James Cruze
- The Gangs of New York (book), Herbert Asbury's 1928 nonfiction book
- Gangs of New York: Music from the Miramax Motion Picture, the soundtrack album for Scorsese's film

== See also ==
- Category:Gangs in New York (state)
- Gangs in New York City
