= Gangs of New York =

2002 film by Martin Scorsese

- Theatrical release poster
- Directed by: Martin Scorsese
- Screenplay by: Jay Cocks; Steven Zaillian; Kenneth Lonergan
- Story by: Jay Cocks
- Based on: The Gangs of New York by Herbert Asbury
- Produced by: Alberto Grimaldi; Harvey Weinstein
- Starring: Leonardo DiCaprio; Daniel Day-Lewis; Cameron Diaz; Jim Broadbent; John C. Reilly; Henry Thomas; Brendan Gleeson
- Cinematography: Michael Ballhaus
- Edited by: Thelma Schoonmaker
- Music by: Howard Shore
- Production companies: Touchstone Pictures (Note: Although credited in the final film, the Touchstone Pictures logo and name were not listed in any promotional material for the film.); Alberto Grimaldi Productions
- Distributed by: Miramax Films (United States); 20th Century Fox (Italy); Initial Entertainment Group (International)
- Release date: December 20, 2002
- Running time: 168 minutes
- Countries: United States; Italy
- Language: English
- Budget: $97–100 million
- Box office: $193.8 million

Gangs of New York is a 2002 epic historical drama film directed by Martin Scorsese and written by Jay Cocks, Steven Zaillian, and Kenneth Lonergan, based on Herbert Asbury's 1928 book The Gangs of New York. The film stars Leonardo DiCaprio, Daniel Day-Lewis, and Cameron Diaz, along with Jim Broadbent, John C. Reilly, Henry Thomas and Brendan Gleeson in supporting roles. The film also marks the start of a collaboration between DiCaprio and Scorsese.

The film is set from 1846 to 1863 when a long-running Catholic–Protestant feud erupts into violence, just as an Irish immigrant group is protesting the threat of conscription during the Civil War. Scorsese spent 20 years developing the project until Miramax Films acquired it in 1999. Principal photography took place in Cinecittà Studios in Rome, and Long Island City, New York City.

Gangs of New York was completed by 2001 but its release was delayed due to the September 11 attacks. The film was theatrically released in the United States on December 20, 2002, and grossed $193.8 million worldwide. It was met with generally positive reviews from critics, and Day-Lewis's performance was highly acclaimed. It received 10 nominations at the 75th Academy Awards, including Best Picture, Best Director for Scorsese, and Best Actor for Day-Lewis, but did not win in any category.

== Plot ==
In the 1846 slum of the Five Points, two rival gangs, the Confederation of American Natives, a nativist Protestant faction led by William "Bill the Butcher" Cutting, and the Dead Rabbits, an Irish Catholic immigrant gang led by "Priest" Vallon, engage in their final turf war outside the Old Brewery, the Dead Rabbits domain, to determine which faction will hold power over the Five Points. During the street brawl, Cutting kills Vallon, orders Vallon's body to remain untouched, and declares the Dead Rabbits outlawed. Having witnessed this, Vallon's young son hides the knife that killed his father before being taken to the Hellgate Orphanage on Blackwell's Island.

16 years later, in 1862, Vallon's son "Amsterdam" returns to the Five Points seeking revenge and retrieves the knife while the Metropolitan Police evict the Irish from the Old Brewery. An old acquaintance, Johnny Sirocco, familiarizes him with the local gang clans, all of whom pay tribute to Cutting, who still controls the Five Points. Amsterdam helps Sirocco loot a burning house one night, during which Cutting takes notice of them. Amsterdam is introduced to Cutting but keeps his past a secret as he seeks recruitment into the gang. He learns many of his father's former lieutenants—particularly "Happy" Jack Mulraney, who has become a corrupt policeman, and McGloin—are now in Cutting's employ, despite his deep anti-Irish and racist views.

Each year, Cutting celebrates the anniversary of his victory over the Dead Rabbits. Amsterdam secretly plans to kill him publicly during this celebration. Amsterdam soon becomes attracted to pickpocket and grifter Jenny Everdeane, with whom Sirocco is also infatuated. Amsterdam gains Cutting's confidence and becomes his protégé, which draws him into the dealings of corrupt Tammany Hall politician William M. Tweed. His first test was to help Sirocco and his crew loot a ship in the harbor, only to find that the Daybreak Boys had already hit the ship and killed everyone aboard.

An assassination attempt takes place against Cutting. He is wounded, but Amsterdam saves his life. Amsterdam encounters Walter 'Monk' McGinn, a former Dead Rabbit, who is aware of Amsterdam's true identity and was behind the assassination plot. He later discovers that Everdeane was once a ward and consort for Cutting until she had an abortion that left her scarred. Sirocco, jealous of Everdeane's affection for Amsterdam and Amsterdam's newfound popularity, reveals his true identity and intentions to Cutting. Cutting baits Amsterdam with a knife throwing act involving Everdeane. As Cutting toasts Priest Vallon, Amsterdam throws his knife, but it is deflected, and Amsterdam is wounded by a counter throw. Cutting then beats him and burns his cheek with a hot blade before banishing him, believing Amsterdam to not be worthy of a death by his hand.

Everdeane implores Amsterdam to escape with her to San Francisco. Amsterdam instead returns to the Five Points, seeking vengeance, and announces his return by hanging a dead rabbit in Paradise Square in front of several Irish gangs that were allied with the Dead Rabbits. Cutting sends corrupt Mulraney to investigate, but Amsterdam garrotes him to death and hangs his body in the square. In retaliation, Cutting has Sirocco beaten and run through with a pike, leaving it to Amsterdam to end his suffering. McGinn later meets with Amsterdam and presents him with Vallon's razor, which he retrieved after the original battle.

When Amsterdam's gang beats McGloin, Cutting and the Natives march on the church and are met by Amsterdam and the Dead Rabbits, with new and former members filling its ranks. No violence ensues, but Cutting promises to return soon. The incident garners newspaper coverage, and Amsterdam presents Tweed with a plan to defeat Cutting's influence: Tweed will back McGinn's candidacy for sheriff and Amsterdam will secure the Irish vote for Tammany. McGinn wins in a landslide via ballot stuffing, and a humiliated Cutting attempts to challenge him to a duel, but after being denied the challenge, he murders McGinn with his own club. McGinn's death prompts an angry Amsterdam to challenge Cutting to a gang battle in Paradise Square, which Cutting accepts.

The Civil War draft riots break out as the gangs are preparing to fight; several households and stores are being broken into, and Union soldiers are deployed to control the rioters. As the rival gangs face off, cannon fire from ships hits Paradise Square, interrupting their battle shortly before it begins. Many of the gang members are killed by the naval gunfire, soldiers, or rioters. Cutting and Amsterdam fight each other amidst the chaos until Cutting is wounded by shrapnel. Finally, Amsterdam uses his father's knife to fatally stab Cutting, who dies as Amsterdam holds his hand.

In the final scene, Amsterdam buries the knife next to his father's grave in a Brooklyn cemetery, and erects a makeshift headstone with the name William Cutting over it alongside the actual gravestone of Priest Vallon. As Amsterdam and Everdeane leave, the skyline changes as a modern New York City rises up over the next century, from the Brooklyn Bridge to the Empire State Building to the World Trade Center, and the cemetery becomes overgrown and forgotten.

== Cast ==
- Leonardo DiCaprio as Amsterdam Vallon, son of the Priest Vallon who was heir to the Dead Rabbits
  - Cian McCormack as young Amsterdam Vallon
- Daniel Day-Lewis as William "Bill the Butcher" Cutting, the vicious leader of the Natives who is a legitimate butcher
- Cameron Diaz as Jenny Everdeane, a skilled thief and grifter whom Amsterdam takes a liking to
- Jim Broadbent as William "Boss" Tweed, a politician affiliated with Cutting
- John C. Reilly as "Happy" Jack Mulraney, a former Dead Rabbitt now a corrupt Constable in the Metropolitan Police
- Henry Thomas as Johnny Sirocco, Vallon's childhood friend from the Five Points who is in Cutting's employment
  - Andrew Gallagher as young Johnny Sirocco
- Brendan Gleeson as Walter "Monk" McGinn, a former Dead Rabbit that fights for coin and seeks to stop Cutting's influence
- Gary Lewis as McGloin, a former Dead Rabbit and racist now in Cuttings employment
- Stephen Graham as Shang, leader of the Chinks
- Eddie Marsan as Killoran, a subordinate for Tweed
- Alec McCowen as Reverend Raleigh, a local Reverend who ran the Dance Hall
- David Hemmings as John F. Schermerhorn, a minister and commissioner to Indian Affairs
- Lawrence Gilliard Jr. as Jimmy Spoils, Sirocco's friend
- Cara Seymour as Hell-Cat Maggie, a former Dead Rabbit whose weapons of choice are sharp claws and razor filed teeth
- Roger Ashton-Griffiths as P. T. Barnum, a showman who hosted some of Cutting's festivities
- Peter Hugo Daly as One-Armed Priest
- Liam Neeson as "Priest" Vallon, Amsterdam's Catholic father who first led the Dead Rabbits against the Natives
- Ford Kiernan as John Decker, a fire chief on Cutting's payroll
- Barbara Bouchet as Eliza Schermerhorn, John Schermerhorn's daughter
- Lucy Davenport as Ms. Schermerhorn, John Schermerhorns's wife
- Michael Byrne as Horace Greeley, a Newspaper editor for the New York Tribune
- John Sessions as Harry Watkins, an Anti-Lincoln stage actor
- Richard Graham as Harvey
- Giovanni Lombardo Radice as Mr. Legree
- Tim Pigott-Smith as Calvinist Minister
- Christian Burgess as Fernando Wood
- Seán McGinley as Forty Thieves Leader
- Peter Berling as Knife Act Caller

== Production ==
Martin Scorsese had grown up in Little Italy in the borough of Manhattan in New York City in the 1950s. He noticed there were parts of his neighborhood that were much older than the rest, including tombstones from the 1810s in Old St. Patrick's Cathedral, cobblestone streets and small basements located under more recent large buildings; this sparked Scorsese's curiosity about the history of the area: "I gradually realized that the Italian-Americans weren't the first ones there, that other people had been there before us. As I began to understand this, it fascinated me. I kept wondering, how did New York look? What were the people like? How did they walk, eat, work, dress?"

=== Development ===
In 1970, Scorsese came across Herbert Asbury's book The Gangs of New York: An Informal History of the Underworld (1928) about the city's nineteenth-century criminal underworld and found it to be a revelation. In the portraits of the city's criminals, Scorsese saw the potential for an American epic about the battle for the modern American democracy. Scorsese immediately contacted his friend Jay Cocks, a film critic for Time magazine. "Think of it like a western in outer space", Scorsese had told him. Cocks recalled they had considered Malcolm McDowell in the lead role and framing the narrative with quotations from Bruce Springsteen, but otherwise, they intended to keep the period vernacular authentic.

At the time, Scorsese was a young director without prestige; by the end of the 1970s, with the success of crime films such as Mean Streets (1973), about his old neighborhood, and Taxi Driver (1976), he was a rising star. In June 1977, producer Alberto Grimaldi ran a two-page ad in Daily Variety, announcing the film's production with Scorsese set to direct. That same year, Scorsese and Cocks wrote the first draft, but Scorsese decided to direct Raging Bull (1980) instead.

In 1979, Scorsese acquired the screen rights to Asbury's book; however, it took twenty years to get the production moving forward. Difficulties arose with reproducing the monumental cityscape of nineteenth-century New York with the style and detail Scorsese wanted; almost nothing in New York City looked as it did in that time, and filming elsewhere was not an option. In 1991, Grimaldi and Scorsese resumed development on the project with Universal Pictures on a budget of $30 million. At one point, Robert De Niro was set to portray Bill the Butcher. In 1997, Universal transferred the rights to the project to Disney, whose then-chairman Joe Roth turned down the film due to its excessive violence, which was "not appropriate for a Disney-themed movie".

Scorsese took the film to Warner Bros. Pictures, being contractually obligated to make a film for the studio. The film was declined by Warner Bros. as well, and afterward declined similarly by 20th Century Fox, Paramount Pictures and Metro-Goldwyn-Mayer (MGM). In 1999, Scorsese was able to find a partnership with Harvey Weinstein, noted producer and co-chairman of Miramax Films. As the film had a large budget of nearly $100 million, Weinstein sold the international distribution rights to the project to Graham King's Initial Entertainment Group for approximately $65 million to secure the required funds. Shortly after, Touchstone Pictures joined Miramax Films in funding the film, in exchange for a portion of the proceeds from domestic distribution.

In 1999, Cocks was retained by Scorsese for the screenplay adaptation, which underwent nine revised drafts. Weinstein was not pleased with the shooting script and wanted other screenwriters brought in for more rewrites. To placate Weinstein, Scorsese called Cocks into a room and fired him. Telling The Globe and Mail, Cocks recalled the situation: "You ever been fired? It's terrible. Terrible. Even if it's a job you don't like, it pisses you off, right? Well you can extrapolate from that, exponentially." Due to this, the final shooting script was not fully completed when filming began. Hossein Amini was hired and wrote the last two drafts, but he was uncredited for his work.

=== Set design ===
In order to create the sets that Scorsese envisioned, the production was filmed at the large Cinecittà Studio in Rome, Italy. Production designer Dante Ferretti recreated over a mile of mid-nineteenth century New York buildings, consisting of a five-block area of Lower Manhattan, including the Five Points slum, a section of the East River waterfront including two full-sized sailing ships, a thirty-building stretch of lower Broadway, a patrician mansion, and replicas of Tammany Hall, a church, a saloon, a Chinese theater, and a gambling casino. For the Five Points, Ferretti recreated George Catlin's 1827 painting of the area.

=== Rehearsals and character development ===
Particular attention was also paid to the speech of characters, as loyalties were often revealed by their accents. The film's voice coach, Tim Monich, resisted using a generic Irish brogue and instead focused on distinctive dialects of Ireland and Great Britain. As DiCaprio's character was born in Ireland but raised in the United States, his accent was designed to be a blend of accents typical of the half-Americanized. To develop the unique, lost accents of the Yankee "Nativists" such as Daniel Day-Lewis's character, Monich studied old poems, ballads, newspaper articles (which sometimes imitated spoken dialect as a form of humor) and the Rogue's Lexicon, a book of underworld idioms compiled by New York's police commissioner, so that his men would be able to tell what criminals were talking about. An important piece was an 1892 wax cylinder recording of Walt Whitman reciting four lines of a poem in which he pronounced the word "Earth" as "Uth", and the "a" of "an" nasal and flat, like "ayan". Monich concluded that native nineteenth-century New Yorkers probably sounded something like the proverbial Brooklyn cabbie of the mid-20th century.

=== Filming ===
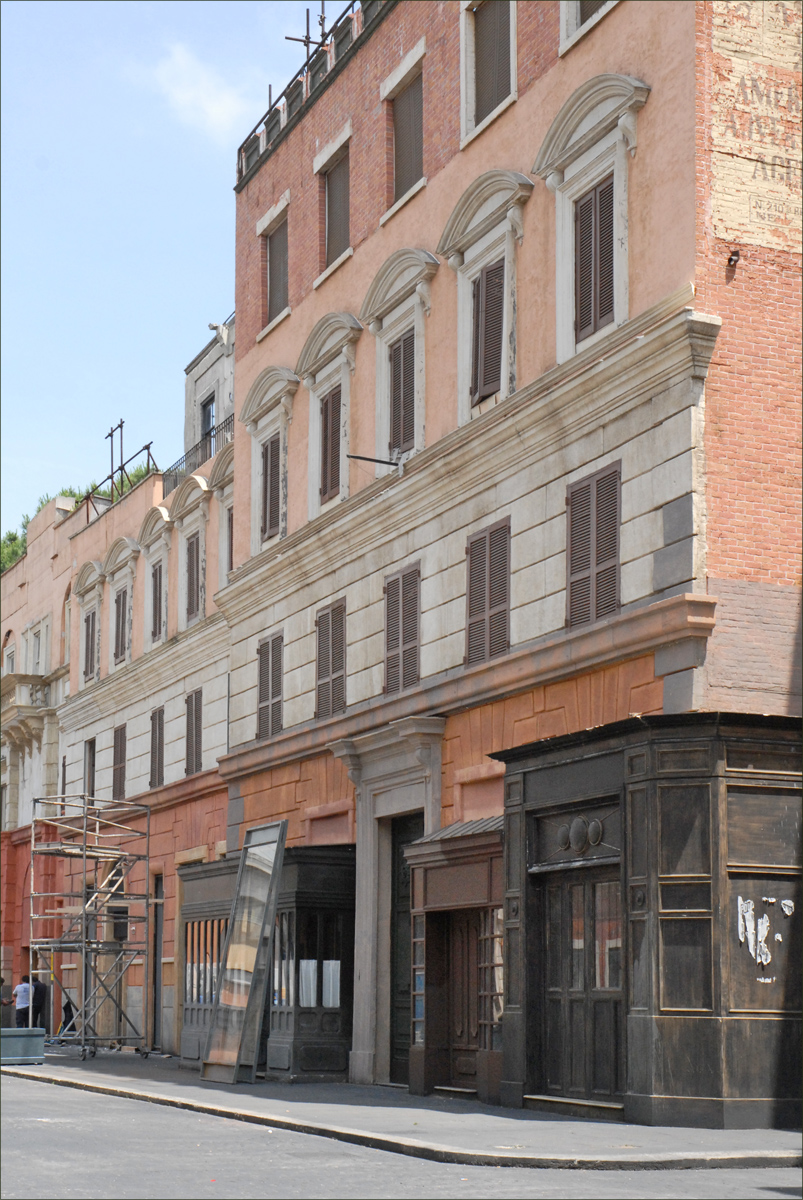
Set of the movie at the Cinecittà Studios in Rome, Italy

Principal photography began in New York and Rome on December 18, 2000, and ended on March 30, 2001. Due to the strong personalities and clashing visions of director and producer, the three-year production became a story in and of itself. Scorsese strongly defended his artistic vision on issues of taste and length while Weinstein fought for a streamlined, more commercial version. During the delays, noted actors such as Robert De Niro and Willem Dafoe had to leave the production due to conflicts with their other productions. Costs overshot the original budget by 25 percent, bringing the total cost over $100 million. The increased budget made the film vital to Miramax Films' short-term success.

=== Post-production and distribution ===
After post-production was nearly completed in 2001, the film was delayed for over a year. The official justification was that after the September 11 attacks, certain elements of the picture may have made audiences uncomfortable; the film's closing shot is a view of modern-day New York City, complete with the World Trade Center's towers, despite them having been destroyed by the attacks over a year before the film's release. Scorsese also went on a two-month hiatus during the film's editing. However, this explanation was refuted in Scorsese's contemporary statements, where he noted the production was still filming pick-ups, even into October 2002. The filmmakers had also considered removing the towers, having the towers dissolved out of the shot to acknowledge their disappearance, or remove the entire sequence altogether. It was ultimately decided to keep the towers unaltered.

Weinstein kept demanding cuts to the film's length, and some of those cuts were eventually made. In December 2001, film critic Jeffrey Wells reviewed a purported workprint of the film as it existed in the fall of 2001. Wells reported the work print lacked narration, was about 20 minutes longer, and although it was "different than the [theatrical] version ... scene after scene after scene play[s] exactly the same in both". Despite the similarities, Wells found the work print to be richer and more satisfying than the theatrical version. While Scorsese has stated the theatrical version is his final cut, he reportedly "passed along [the] three-hour-plus [work print] version of Gangs on tape [to friends] and confided, 'Putting aside my contractual obligation to deliver a shorter, two-hour-and-forty-minute version to Miramax, this is the version I'm happiest with,' or words to that effect".

Scorsese considered retiring from filmmaking after the experience of working on the film.

In an interview with Roger Ebert, Scorsese clarified the real issues in the cutting of the film. Ebert notes,

His discussions with Weinstein, he said, were always about finding the length where the picture worked. When that got to the press, it was translated into fights. The movie is currently 168 minutes long, he said, and that is the right length, and that's why there won't be any director's cut — because this is the director's cut.

=== Soundtrack ===
Robbie Robertson supervised the soundtrack's collection of eclectic pop, folk, and neo-classical tracks. The score is by Howard Shore. The rest of the selections included on the soundtrack album are a mix of contemporary pop and world music compositions and tunes from mid-nineteenth century Ireland.

== Historical accuracy ==
Scorsese received both praise and criticism for historical depictions in the film. In a PBS interview for the History News Network, George Washington University Professor Tyler Anbinder said the visuals and discrimination against immigrants in the film were historically accurate, but both the amount of violence depicted and the number of Chinese, particularly female, immigrants were greater in the film than in reality.

Asbury's book described the Bowery Boys, Plug Uglies, True Blue Americans, Shirt Tails, and Dead Rabbits, who were named after their battle standard, a dead rabbit on a pike. The book also described William Poole, the inspiration for William "Bill the Butcher" Cutting, a member of the Bowery Boys, a bare-knuckle boxer, and a leader of the Know Nothing political movement. Poole did not come from the Five Points and was assassinated nearly a decade before the Draft Riots. Both the fictional Bill and the real one had butcher shops, but Poole is not known to have killed anyone.

Anbinder said Scorsese's recreation of the visual environment of mid-19th-century New York City and the Five Points "couldn't have been much better". All sets were built completely on the exterior stages of Cinecittà Studios in Rome.

As early as 1839, Mayor Philip Hone said, "This city is infested by gangs of hardened wretches" who "patrol the streets making night hideous and insulting all who are not strong enough to defend themselves". The large gang fight depicted in the film as occurring in 1846 is fictional, although there was one between the Bowery Boys and Dead Rabbits in the Five Points on July 4, 1857, which is not mentioned in the film. Reviewer Vincent DiGirolamo concluded that "Gangs of New York becomes a historical epic with no change over time. The effect is to freeze ethno-cultural rivalries over the course of three decades and portray them as irrational ancestral hatreds unaltered by demographic shifts, economic cycles and political realignments."

In the film, the Draft Riots of July 1863 are depicted as both destructive and violent. Records indicate the riots resulted in more than one hundred deaths, including the lynching of 11 free African-Americans. They were especially targeted by the Irish, in part because of fears of job competition that more freed slaves would cause in the city. The bombardment of the city by Navy ships offshore to quell the riots is wholly fictitious. The film references the infamous Tweed Courthouse, as "Boss" Tweed refers to plans for the structure as being "modest" and "economical".

In the film, Chinese Americans were common enough in the city to have their own community and public venues. Although Chinese people migrated to America as early as the 1840s, significant Chinese migration to New York City did not begin until 1869, the time when the transcontinental railroad was completed. The Chinese theater on Pell St. was not finished until the 1890s. The Old Brewery, the overcrowded tenement shown in the movie in both 1846 and 1862–63, was actually demolished in 1852.

In the film, Priest Vallon recites the St. Michael Prayer, but in reality, this prayer was not composed until 1886.

== Release ==
The original target release date was December 21, 2001, in time for the 74th Academy Awards, but the production overshot that goal as Scorsese was still filming. A twenty-minute clip, billed as an "extended preview", debuted at the 2002 Cannes Film Festival and was shown at a star-studded event at the Palais des Festivals et des Congrès with Scorsese, DiCaprio, Diaz and Weinstein in attendance.

Harvey Weinstein then wanted the film to open on December 25, 2002, but a potential conflict with another film starring Leonardo DiCaprio, Catch Me If You Can, produced by DreamWorks, caused him to move the opening day to an earlier position. After negotiations between several parties, including the interests of DiCaprio, Weinstein and DreamWorks' Jeffrey Katzenberg, the decision was made on economic grounds: DiCaprio did not want to face a conflict of promoting two movies opening against each other; Katzenberg was able to convince Weinstein the violence and adult material in Gangs of New York would not necessarily attract families on Christmas. Of main concern to all involved was attempting to maximize the film's opening day, an important part of film industry economics.

The film was released on December 20, 2002, a year after its original planned release date. Although the film has been released on DVD and Blu-ray, there are no plans to revisit the theatrical cut or prepare a "director's cut" for home video release. "Marty doesn't believe in that", editor Thelma Schoonmaker stated. "He believes in showing only the finished film."

Gangs of New York was released on VHS and a 2-disc DVD on July 1, 2003, by Buena Vista Home Entertainment (under the Miramax Home Entertainment label) with the film split between both discs. A Blu-ray version of the film was released on July 1, 2008, while a remastered Blu-ray was released on February 2, 2010.

== Reception ==
=== Box office ===
The film made $77,812,000 in Canada and the United States. It also took $23,763,699 in Japan (where it was distributed by Shochiku and Nippon Herald Films) and $16,358,580 in the United Kingdom (where it was distributed by Entertainment Film Distributors). Worldwide, the film grossed a total of $193,772,504.

Losses by Miramax Films were offset that year by the success of Chicago (2002), the musical, whose domestic box office zoomed to $170 million and which captured a Best Picture Oscar. Although Harvey Weinstein said Miramax Films lost no money on Gangs of New York, an internal Disney memo reported that the true bottom line for Gangs of New York is it lost $6 million.

=== Critical reception ===
On review aggregator Rotten Tomatoes, Gangs of New York has an approval rating of 72% based on 210 reviews, with an average rating of 7.10/10. The website's critical consensus reads: "Though flawed, the sprawling, messy Gangs of New York is redeemed by impressive production design and Day-Lewis's electrifying performance." Metacritic gave the film a score of 72 out of 100, based on 39 critics, indicating "generally favorable" reviews. Audiences polled by CinemaScore gave the film an average grade of "B" on a scale of A+ to F.

Roger Ebert of the Chicago Sun-Times praised the film but believed it fell short of Scorsese's best work, while his At the Movies co-host Richard Roeper called it a "masterpiece" and declared it a leading contender for Best Picture.

Paul Clinton of CNN called the film "a grand American epic".

In Variety, Todd McCarthy wrote that the film "falls somewhat short of great film status, but is still a richly impressive and densely realized work that bracingly opens the eye and mind to untaught aspects of American history". McCarthy singled out the meticulous attention to historical detail and production design for particular praise.

The February 2020 issue of New York magazine lists Gangs of New York as among "The Best Movies That Lost Best Picture at the Oscars".

Some critics were disappointed with the film, with one reviewer on CinemaBlend feeling it was overly violent, with few characters worth caring about. Others felt it tried to tackle too many themes without saying anything unique about them, and that the overall story was weak.

Cameron Diaz's divisive performance as Irish immigrant pickpocket Jenny Everdeane has been cited as an example of poor casting and, along with DiCaprio, one of the worst Irish accents in film.

=== Top ten lists ===
Gangs of New York was listed on many critics' top ten lists of 2002.

- 1st – Peter Travers, Rolling Stone
- 1st – Richard Roeper, Ebert & Roeper
- 2nd – Richard Corliss, Time
- 2nd – Ann Hornaday, The Washington Post
- 3rd – F. X. Feeney, LA Weekly
- 3rd – Scott Tobias, The A.V. Club
- 5th – Jami Bernard, New York Daily News
- 5th – Claudia Puig, USA Today
- 6th – Mike Clark, USA Today
- 6th – Nathan Rabin, The A.V. Club
- 6th – Chris Kaltenbach, Baltimore Sun
- 8th – A.O. Scott, The New York Times
- 9th – Stephen Holden, The New York Times
- Top 10 (listed alphabetically) – Mark Olsen, LA Weeklyy
- Top 10 (listed alphabetically) – Carrie Rickey, Philadelphia Inquirer

== Accolades ==
| Award | Date of ceremony | Category | Recipient(s) | Result | Ref. |
|---|---|---|---|---|---|
| Academy Awards | March 23, 2003 | Best Picture | Alberto Grimaldi, Harvey Weinstein | Nominated | |
| Academy Awards | March 23, 2003 | Best Director | Martin Scorsese | Nominated | |
| Academy Awards | March 23, 2003 | Best Actor | Daniel Day-Lewis | Nominated | |
| Academy Awards | March 23, 2003 | Best Original Screenplay | Jay Cocks, Steven Zaillian, Kenneth Lonergan | Nominated | |
| Academy Awards | March 23, 2003 | Best Production Design | Dante Ferretti, Francesca Lo Schiavo | Nominated | |
| Academy Awards | March 23, 2003 | Best Cinematography | Michael Ballhaus | Nominated | |
| Academy Awards | March 23, 2003 | Best Costume Design | Sandy Powell | Nominated | |
| Academy Awards | March 23, 2003 | Best Film Editing | Thelma Schoonmaker | Nominated | |
| Academy Awards | March 23, 2003 | Best Original Song | Bono, The Edge, Adam Clayton, Larry Mullen; For the song "The Hands That Built America" | Nominated | |
| Academy Awards | March 23, 2003 | Best Sound | Tom Fleischman, Eugene Gearty, Ivan Sharrock | Nominated | |
| British Academy Film Awards | February 23, 2003 | Best Film | Alberto Grimaldi, Harvey Weinstein | Nominated | |
| British Academy Film Awards | February 23, 2003 | Best Direction | Martin Scorsese | Nominated | |
| British Academy Film Awards | February 23, 2003 | Best Actor in a Leading Role | Daniel Day-Lewis | Won | |
| British Academy Film Awards | February 23, 2003 | Best Original Screenplay | Jay Cocks, Steven Zaillian, Kenneth Lonergan | Nominated | |
| British Academy Film Awards | February 23, 2003 | Best Cinematography | Michael Ballhaus | Nominated | |
| British Academy Film Awards | February 23, 2003 | Best Film Music | Howard Shore | Nominated | |
| British Academy Film Awards | February 23, 2003 | Best Editing | Thelma Schoonmaker | Nominated | |
| British Academy Film Awards | February 23, 2003 | Best Sound | Tom Fleischman, Ivan Sharrock, Eugene Gearty, Philip Stockton | Nominated | |
| British Academy Film Awards | February 23, 2003 | Best Production Design | Dante Ferretti | Nominated | |
| British Academy Film Awards | February 23, 2003 | Best Costume Design | Sandy Powell | Nominated | |
| British Academy Film Awards | February 23, 2003 | Best Makeup | Manlio Rocchetti, Aldo Signoretti | Nominated | |
| British Academy Film Awards | February 23, 2003 | Best Special Visual Effects | R. Bruce Steinheimer, Michael Owens, Ed Hirsh, Jon Alexander | Nominated | |
| Chicago Film Critics Association | January 8, 2003 | Best Director | Martin Scorsese | Nominated | |
| Chicago Film Critics Association | January 8, 2003 | Best Actor | Daniel Day-Lewis | Won | |
| Chicago Film Critics Association | January 8, 2003 | Best Cinematography | Michael Ballhaus | Nominated | |
| Critics' Choice Movie Awards | January 17, 2003 | Best Picture | | Nominated | |
| Critics' Choice Movie Awards | January 17, 2003 | Best Director | Martin Scorsese | Nominated | |
| Critics' Choice Movie Awards | January 17, 2003 | Best Actor | Daniel Day-Lewis | Won | |
| Directors Guild of America | March 1, 2003 | Best Director – Feature Film | Martin Scorsese | Nominated | |
| Empire Awards | February 4, 2004 | Best Actor | Daniel Day-Lewis | Nominated | |
| Empire Awards | February 4, 2004 | Scene of the Year | The flag speech | Nominated | |
| Florida Film Critics Circle Awards | January 3, 2003 | Best Actor | Daniel Day-Lewis | Won | |
| Florida Film Critics Circle Awards | January 3, 2003 | Best Director | Martin Scorsese | Won | |
| Golden Globe Awards | January 19, 2003 | Best Motion Picture – Drama | | Nominated | |
| Golden Globe Awards | January 19, 2003 | Best Director | Martin Scorsese | Won | |
| Golden Globe Awards | January 19, 2003 | Best Actor– Motion Picture Drama | Daniel Day-Lewis | Nominated | |
| Golden Globe Awards | January 19, 2003 | Best Supporting Actress – Motion Picture | Cameron Diaz | Nominated | |
| Golden Globe Awards | January 19, 2003 | Best Original Song | Bono, The Edge, Adam Clayton, Larry Mullen; For the song "The Hands That Built America" | Won | |
| Los Angeles Film Critics Association | December 15, 2002 | Best Actor | Daniel Day-Lewis | Won | |
| Los Angeles Film Critics Association | December 15, 2002 | Best Production Design | Dante Ferretti | Won | |
| New York Film Critics Circle | January 12, 2003 | Best Actor | Daniel Day-Lewis | Won | |
| Online Film Critics Society Awards | January 6, 2003 | Top 10 films | | 5th place | |
| Online Film Critics Society Awards | January 6, 2003 | Best Director | Martin Scorsese | Nominated | |
| Online Film Critics Society Awards | January 6, 2003 | Best Actor | Daniel Day-Lewis | Won | |
| Online Film Critics Society Awards | January 6, 2003 | Best Cinematography | Michael Ballhaus | Nominated | |
| Online Film Critics Society Awards | January 6, 2003 | Best Ensemble | | Nominated | |
| Online Film Critics Society Awards | January 6, 2003 | Best Art Direction | Dante Ferretti | Nominated | |
| Online Film Critics Society Awards | January 6, 2003 | Best Costume Design | Sandy Powell | Nominated | |
| Online Film Critics Society Awards | January 6, 2003 | Best Sound | Tom Fleischman, Eugene Gearty, Ivan Sharrock | Nominated | |
| San Diego Film Critics Society Awards | December 20, 2002 | Best Actor | Daniel Day-Lewis | Won | |
| Satellite Awards | January 12, 2003 | Best Actor – Drama | Daniel Day-Lewis | Won | |
| Satellite Awards | January 12, 2003 | Best Art Direction | Dante Ferretti | Won | |
| Satellite Awards | January 12, 2003 | Best Costume Design | Sandy Powell | Nominated | |
| Satellite Awards | January 12, 2003 | Best Cinematography | Michael Ballhaus | Nominated | |
| Satellite Awards | January 12, 2003 | Best Editing | Thelma Schoonmaker | Won | |
| Satellite Awards | January 12, 2003 | Best Sound | Tom Fleischman, Eugene Gearty, Ivan Sharrock | Nominated | |
| Satellite Awards | January 12, 2003 | Best Visual Effects | | Nominated | |
| Screen Actors Guild Award | March 9, 2003 | Best Actor | Daniel Day-Lewis | Won | |
| Vancouver Film Critics Circle | January 30, 2002 | Best Film | | Nominated | |
| Vancouver Film Critics Circle | January 30, 2002 | Best Director | Martin Scorsese | Nominated | |
| Vancouver Film Critics Circle | January 30, 2002 | Best Actor | Daniel Day-Lewis | Won | |
| Visual Effects Society Awards | February 19, 2003 | Best Supporting Visual Effects | Michael Owens, Camille Geier, Edward Hirsh, Jon Alexander | Nominated | |
| Visual Effects Society Awards | February 19, 2003 | Best Matte Painting | Brett Northcutt, Ronn Brown, Mathieu Raynault, Evan Pontoriero | Nominated | |
| Writers Guild of America | March 8, 2003 | Best Original Screenplay | Jay Cocks, Steven Zaillian, Kenneth Lonergan | Nominated | |

== See also ==
- Irish Americans in New York City
- Irish Brigade (Union army)
- List of 2002 films based on actual events
- List of identities in The Gangs of New York (book)

== Bibliography ==
- Lohr, Matt R. (2015). "Irish-American Identity in the Films of Martin Scorsese". In Baker, Aaron (ed.). A Companion to Martin Scorsese. Hoboken, NJ: Wiley-Blackwell. pp. 195–213. ISBN 978-1-44433-861-4.
- Gilfoyle, Timothy J. (2003). "Scorsese's Gangs of New York: Why Myth Matters". Journal of Urban History. 29 (5): 620–630. doi:10.1177/0096144203029005006. S2CID 143530413.
- O'Brien, Martin; Tzanelli, Rodanthi; Yar, Majid & Penna, Sue (2005). "'The spectacle of fearsome acts': Crime in the melting p(l)ot in Gangs of New York". Critical Criminology. 31 (1): 17–35. doi:10.1007/s10612-004-6111-9. S2CID 143968620.
- Palmer, Bryan D. (2003). "The Hands That Built America: A Class-Politics Appreciation of Martin Scorsese's 'The Gangs of New York'" (PDF). Historical Materialism. 11 (4): 317–345. doi:10.1163/9789004301849_009. ISBN 9789004297227.
- Scorsese, Martin & Sante, Luc (2002). Gangs of New York: Making The Movie. New York City: Miramax Books. ISBN 978-0-78686-893-3.
