= Jimmy Haggerty =

19th-century American gangster

- Jimmy Haggerty and his gang the Schuylkill Rangers committed many crimes along the Philadelphia waterfront in the 1850s.
- Born: McAran's Garden, Philadelphia, Pennsylvania
- Died: January 25, 1871; Manhattan, New York City, New York
- Cause of death: murder by gunshot wound
- Resting place: Catheral Cemetery, Cathedral Park, Philadelphia, Pennsylvania
- Other name: Wild Jimmy
- Occupations: mule driver, saloon keeper, soldier, bounty jumper, criminal gang leader, thief
- Employer: self-employed
- Known for: Being a longtime underworld figure in Philadelphia and New York City; a leader of the Irish criminal gang the Schuylkill Rangers who committed crimes on the Philadelphia waterfront and took part in the disorder at the urging of the Dead Rabbits and the Baltimore Plug Uglies in the 1863 New York City Draft Riots

Schuylkill Rangers
- Founded by: Jimmy Haggerty
- Founding location: South Philadelphia, Pennsylvania
- Years active: 1825-1860s
- Territory: South Philadelphia, Pennsylvania, Manhattan, New York City, New York
- Ethnicity: Irish
- Membership (est.): ?
- Criminal activities: street fighting, knife fighting, assault, murder, robbery
- Allies: Most Irish gangs
- Rivals: Nativist gangs

James "Wild Jimmy" Haggerty (died January 25, 1871) was an American criminal and well-known underworld mob figure in Philadelphia and later in New York City during the mid-to late 19th century. Jimmy Haggerty was the leader of the Schuylkill Rangers, a predominantly Irish-American street gang, which terrorized the South Philadelphia waterfront, specifically its local wharves and coal yards, for over 25 years.

The notorious Philadelphia gangs existed from 1836-1878 being sixty-five in all including the Schuylkill Rangers were the American Guards *(also in New York City); Bleeders; Blood Tubs *(also in Baltimore); Blossoms; Bouncers; Buffers; Bugs; Bulldogs; Centre Street Boys; Chesapeakes; Crockets; Darts; Deathfetchers; Dogs; Dog-Towners; Flayers; Fly-By-Nights; Garroters; Gumballs; Hyenas; Jack of Clubs; Jumpers; Juniatta Club; Kensington Blackhawks; Kerryonians *(also in New York City); Keystone No. 2; Killers; Lancers; Molly Maguires; Neckers; Nighthawks; Orangemen; Pickwick Club; Pluckers; Pots No. 2; Privateer Club No. 1; Rangers; Rats; Reading Hose Club; Rebels; Red Roses; Reed Birds; Shifflers; Skinners; Smashers; Snakers; Snappers; Spiggots; Spitfires; Sporters; Springers; Stingers; Stockholders; The Forty Thieves (also in New York City); The Vesper Social; Tormentors; Turks; Vampyres; Waynetowners; Weecys; Whelps; Wild Cats; Wreckers. Many of these criminal gangs were originally organized as volunteer Philadelphia Fire Department companies similar to the gang the Bowery Boys of the New York City Fire Department.

Jimmy Haggerty ruled over the Schuylkill Rangers throughout the 1850s and was the gang's last leader until their break up following the American Civil War by an undercover Philadelphia Police lieutenant. He remained one of the city's most notorious bank robbers during the post-Civil War era and later resided in New York where he spent his last years before being murdered by Reddy the Blacksmith during a bar brawl in January 1871.

== Early life ==
James Haggerty was born in Philadelphia, Pennsylvania to a large working-class family near the banks of the Schuylkill River; his boyhood home was located on Arch Street in the area between Eighteenth and Nineteenth Street known as "McAran's Garden". His father, John Haggerty, was a "boss" drayman widely respected by the local business community "as an honest, upright and faithful servant". Haggerty remained free of criminal activity during his childhood, however he did not attend school and received little education.

Jimmy Haggerty age 21 became employed a mule driver for the Reading Railroad. He continued in this profession, as well as ran a local saloon, until the start of the American Civil War in which he voluntarily enlisted in the Union Army.

== Criminal career in Philadelphia ==
Although it is unknown under the exact circumstances he left the service, whether he received an honorable discharge or took "French leave", he soon became a "bounty jumper". He became acquainted with a number of known criminals during this time and, returning to Philadelphia following the war, became involved in illegal bare-knuckle boxing and eventually petty theft, armed robbery and burglary. Although he was considered extremely violent when drunk, police officers testified to his reluctance to murder a victim in cold blood and described the frequent use of his pistol as a blackjack in confrontations, he was connected to a number of major robberies during his career. Among them were the robberies of the Eleventh Street and Chestnut Street Banks, the Philadelphia Savings Bank and the safe burglary of the Dancannon Iron Works. He was also involved in the robbery of White's Dental Depot where an African-American watchman was murdered.

After numerous arrests for theft and similar offenses, he and Hugh Murphy were convicted of the robbery of a Ninth Street store and sentenced to ten years imprisonment on December 12, 1865. He was pardoned by Governor Andrew G. Curtin eight months later, in part to Haggerty's political connections and his promise to leave the country upon his release, and lived in Canada for a brief time before returning to the city to resume his criminal career. Haggerty remained a major underworld figure in Philadelphia until January 1869 when he was arrested on several counts of assault with intent to kill; during his arrest, he shot the arresting police officer.

He was caught trying to escape from prison but was later released on bail and fled the city. Staying in New York for a brief time, he returned to Philadelphia in April to surrender himself to authorities after the wounded police officer had received "hush money". He won both court cases against him, but was ordered at the second trial to return to the Eastern State Penitentiary by the District Attorney for violating the terms of his release. While his lawyers argued the ruling, Haggerty escaped from the courthouse during a recess in what was suspected to have been planned.

== Criminal years in New York City and death ==
He eventually returned to New York where he resided during the last two years of his life. He was involved in disputes with a number of criminal figures, for example, when he and Billy Tracy were thrown out of a Bowery gambling resort by its owner Harry Hill and British lightweight boxer Billy Edwards in November 1870. On the afternoon of January 24, 1871, Haggerty and three others arrived at Jem Mace's Capitol Saloon on Twenty-Third Street. They had become intoxicated while traveling by sleigh along Harlem Lane and, shortly after their arrival, they became involved in a violent altercation with another group of patrons. It was thought that Haggerty and his party were about to use their pistols when a local patrolman and a City Hall officer arrived from nearby Booth's Theater. At the appearance of the patrolman walking through the saloon door, Haggerty drew his revolver and pistol whipped him sending the officer outside. As the two officers went to get reinforcements, Haggerty and his men made their escape on the sleigh. His whereabouts remained unknown until early the next morning when he entered Patrick Egan's saloon. While there, his friend Billy Tracy became involved in a dispute with Shang Draper stemming from the earlier dispute at Jem Mace's saloon. Reddy the Blacksmith, a longtime member of the Bowery Boys, attempted to separate the two but Haggerty confronted Reddy and demanded that he stay out of it. As the two argued, Haggerty reportedly attempted to grab a decanter from the bar to strike the Bowery Boy with causing Reddy to draw his pistol and shot Haggerty in the abdomen. Haggerty was taken to a room in West Houston Street where claimed he did not know either Tracy or Draper and that he was so intoxicated that he was unable to recognize who fired the shot. Although mortally wounded, an examination finding the bullet had penetrated his intestines, Haggerty refused to name his attacker and died from his wounds later that evening.

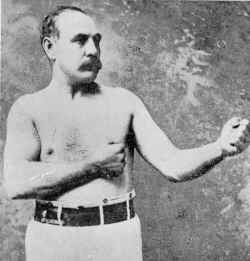
In 1871, Jimmy Haggerty, arrived in the Manhattan, New York City Capital Saloon owned by former champion boxer Jem Mace and was mortally wounded in a bar fight from a gun shot received by Reddy the Blacksmith, of the Bowery Boys gang. Photograph of Jem Mace

His funeral was perhaps one of the biggest held in Philadelphia's history and took place at his mother's residence at the northeast corner of Twenty-Third and Filbert Streets, the longtime headquarters of Schuylkill Rangers, and was attended by what was thought to be one of the largest criminal gatherings of the era. Among the hundred or so mourners included Squire McMullin, John Ahern and Robert Lister Smith.

An official inquest was held in the days following his death, attracting a number of prominent criminals such as Dan Noble, Joe King, Johnny Moore, Richard Barron and Broker Dick among others, before it was finally concluded on February 1 with Reddy being released on a $10,000 bail.
