= Herbert Asbury =

American journalist and writer (1889–1963)

- Born: September 1, 1891; Farmington, Missouri, U.S.
- Died: February 24, 1963 (aged 71); New York City, New York, U.S.
- Occupations: Writer and journalist
- Spouse: Edith Evans Asbury (1945–1963; his death)
- Writing career
- Genre: Social history
- Notable works: The Gangs of New York: An Informal History of the Underworld; The Barbary Coast: An Informal History of the San Francisco Underworld

Herbert Asbury (September 1, 1891 – February 24, 1963) was an American journalist and writer best known for his books detailing crime during the 19th and early-20th centuries, such as Gem of the Prairie: An Informal History of the Chicago Underworld, The Barbary Coast: An Informal History of the San Francisco Underworld, Sucker's Progress: An Informal History of Gambling in America and The Gangs of New York.

The Gangs of New York was later adapted for film as Martin Scorsese's Gangs of New York (2002). However, the film adaptation of Gangs of New York was so loose that Gangs was nominated for "Best Original Screenplay" rather than as a screenplay adapted from another work.

== Early life ==
Born in Farmington, Missouri, he was raised in a highly religious family which included several generations of devout Methodist preachers. His great-great uncle was Francis Asbury, the first bishop of the Methodist Church to be ordained in the United States. When he was in his early teens, he and his siblings Mary, Emmett and Fred Asbury became disenchanted with the local Southern Methodist church.

During World War I, Asbury enlisted as a private in the United States Army. He was later promoted to sergeant and then to second lieutenant. He served in France until his lungs were severely damaged in a gas attack (as a result, he had health problems throughout his life). He received an honorable discharge in January 1919.

== H. L. Mencken and The American Mercury ==
Asbury achieved first notoriety with "Hatrack", a story that H. L. Mencken published in his magazine, The American Mercury, in 1926. The story profiled a prostitute from Asbury's hometown of Farmington, Missouri. The prostitute took her Protestant customers to the Catholic cemetery to conduct business, and took her Catholic customers to the Protestant cemetery; some in Farmington considered this woman beyond redemption.

The article caused a sensation: The Boston Watch and Ward Society had the magazine banned. Mencken then journeyed to Boston, sold a copy of his magazine on Boston Common, and was arrested. Sales of the recently founded Mercury boomed, and Asbury became a celebrity. Asbury then focused his attention on a series of articles debunking temperance crusader Carrie Nation.

The following year he wrote a biography of Francis Asbury.

== Later career ==
Herbert continued working as a reporter for various newspapers including The Atlanta Georgian, the New York Sun, the New York Herald and the New York Tribune. In 1928, he decided to devote his time exclusively to writing. During this time, he wrote numerous books and magazine articles on true crime. He was also involved in screenwriting and wrote several plays which appeared on Broadway. None was successful.

Asbury married Edith Evans Asbury in 1945, a journalist ultimately employed by The New York Times, where she spent most of her career as a reporter.

After his final book, The Great Illusion: An Informal History of Prohibition in 1950, he retired from writing. Asbury died on February 24, 1963, at the age of 71 from a chronic lung disease.

== Recent years ==
The 2002 film Gangs of New York by director Martin Scorsese about the underworld and civil strife / riots among immigrant groups from the 1840s to the Civil War era revitalized interest in Asbury, and many of Asbury's works, mostly chronicling the largely hidden history of the seamier side of American popular culture, have been reissued. In 2008, The Library of America selected an excerpt from The Gangs of New York for inclusion in its two-century retrospective of American True Crime.

Although his books have long been popular within the true crime genre, commentators such as Lucy Sante, Tyler Anbinder and Tracy Melton have suggested that Asbury took journalistic liberties with his material. However, Asbury's books generally feature lengthy bibliographies, noting the newspapers, books, pamphlets, police reports and personal interviews he drew upon for his works. Most are footnoted, citing source material by publication title, date and page.

In 2005, Tracy Melton claimed in his book Hanging Henry Gambrill: The Violent Career of Baltimore's Plug Uglies, 1854–1860 that the Plug Uglies were actually a Baltimore-based gang. New York City newspapers compared the Dead Rabbits to the Baltimore Plug Uglies following the July 4, 1857, riots, which occurred just a month after Plug Ugly involvement in the Know-Nothing Riot in Washington, D.C.

== Bibliography ==
- Up From Methodism (1926).
- A Methodist Saint: The Life of Bishop Asbury (1927). A biography of Rev. Francis Asbury.
- The Devil of Pei-ling (1927). A novel.
- The Tick of the Clock (1928). A novel.
- The Gangs of New York: An Informal History of the Underworld (1928). Reprinted in original format 1989 Dorset Press; ISBN 0-88029-429-9. Republished in 2001 with material posthumously promoted as a foreword by Jorge Luis Borges.
- Not at Night: A Collection of Weird Tales NY: Macy-Macius, (1928). This volume claimed to reprint stories from the British edition of Weird Tales magazine but was in fact a pirated edition of stories from Christine Campbell Thomson's 'Not at Night' anthology series. For a time Weird Tales (from which most of the stories derived) threatened to sue the publisher, but the publisher eventually withdrew the book from circulation.
- The Bon Vivant's Companion: Or, How to Mix Drinks (1928). Written by Jerry Thomas, reissue edited by Asbury.
- [The Life of] Carry Nation (1928).
- Ye Olde Fire Laddies Alfred A. Knopf, New York (1930). An informal history of firefighting in New York City.
- The Barbary Coast: An Informal History of the San Francisco Underworld Alfred A. Knopf, New York (1933). ISBN 1-56025-408-4.
- All Around the Town: Murder, Scandal, Riot and Mayhem in Old New York (1934). (reissued as a "Sequel to Gangs of New York).
- The Breathless Moment (with Philip Van Doren Stern) (1935).
- The French Quarter: An Informal History of the New Orleans Underworld (1936). ISBN 1-56025-494-7.
- Sucker's Progress: An Informal History of Gambling in America (1938).
- Gem of the Prairie: An Informal History of the Chicago Underworld (1940). Reissued in 1986 by Northern Illinois University Press with a preface by Perry R. Duis; reissued again as The Gangs of Chicago ISBN 1-56025-454-8.
- The Golden Flood: An Informal History of America's First Oil Field Alfred A. Knopf, New York, (1941) (often dated 1942).
- The Great Illusion: An Informal History of Prohibition (1950).

== Filmography ==
Asbury is credited with several crime-thriller screenplays for Columbia Pictures, which he co-wrote with Fred Niblo Jr (1903–1973):

- Gangs of New York (1938)
- Name the Woman (1934)
- Among the Missing (1934)
- Fugitive Lady (1934)
