= Edith Evans Asbury =

American journalist (1910–2008)

- Asbury circa 2005
- Born: Edith Florence Snyder; June 30, 1910; New Boston, Ohio
- Died: October 30, 2008 (aged 98)
- Occupation: Writer
- Employer: The New York Times
- Spouses: Paul Evans (m. 1930–1938) Herbert Asbury (m. 1945–1958) Robert E. Garst (m. 1971–1980)

Edith Evans Asbury (née Snyder; June 30, 1910 – October 30, 2008) was an American journalist who spent nearly 30 years as a reporter with The New York Times.

== Biography ==
Born Edith Florence Snyder on June 30, 1910, in New Boston, Ohio to Fletcher and Mary (née Lutz) Snyder. She was the eldest of 16 children. After a summer job at the Cincinnati Times-Star at age 19, she left Western College for Women with a passion for journalism that would last most of her life. She married Joe Evans when she was 20 and the couple moved to Knoxville, Tennessee, where she attended the University of Tennessee, receiving bachelor's and master's degrees in American history in 1932 and 1933 respectively. She took a job as a reporter with the Knoxville News Sentinel from 1933 to 1937.

In 1937, at the height of the Great Depression, she left Knoxville and her husband (whom she later divorced) and headed to Manhattan despite the lack of any pre-planned prospects for work and wired her editor that she was quitting her job. In New York, she found a sequence of jobs with the New York Post, the New York City Housing Authority, the Associated Press and the New York World-Telegram and Sun, where she served as assistant editor for women's news. While at the World-Telegram in 1952, Asbury was elected President of the New York Newspaper Women's Club.

She married journalist Herbert Asbury in 1945; the two divorced in 1958. It was the second marriage for both. Her husband was best known for his 1928 book The Gangs of New York, which was later adapted as a screenplay for the 2002 Martin Scorsese film. Her 1971 marriage to Times assistant managing editor Robert E. Garst ended with his death in 1980.

== The New York Times ==
She accepted a position with The New York Times in 1952 with the proviso that she be assigned to the city room and not the women's department of the paper. Her first byline in the paper was a story from December 5, 1952, on a ceremony welcoming Saint Nicholas held in Westchester County, New York. Others among her earliest stories with the paper included items about holiday shopping on Fifth Avenue, a lost canary, and the Fifth Avenue Easter Parade.

More serious work followed, including a 1955 series on the problems of the elderly. She was one of several reporters sent by the Times in 1956 to write about desegregation in the South following the Supreme Court's 1954 decision Brown v. Board of Education, which was summarized in a special eight-page section published in March 1956 and made available to the public as a reprint. Her reporting in 1958 about an unwritten ban on counseling and prescription of birth control in New York City hospitals was credited with helping overturn the ban.

Asbury was known for her tenacity; New York City Mayor John Lindsay was said to have been so angered by her that he smashed his telephone after slamming down the receiver. Even after her retirement from the Times in 1981, Asbury continued to write for the paper, including items about travel to Europe and China. Into her 90s, Asbury would call reporters at the paper, offering suggestions on potential stories that had been overlooked.

== Awards and recognition ==
The Women's Press Club of New York City gave Asbury its Newspaper Award of Merit for "outstanding achievement in the field of journalism of benefit to the City of New York in 1964". Asbury was recognized in 1967 with the Page One Award from the Newspaper Guild of New York for a series about a family's successful battle to adopt a blind foster child.

Asbury was also one of the first women allowed to join the Inner Circle Show in 1973.

== Death and legacy ==
Her health had deteriorated for two years, and she died at her home in Greenwich Village in Manhattan at age 98, on October 30, 2008. A specific cause of death was not disclosed. Asbury's papers and correspondence are available at the La Guardia and Wagner Archives.
