= Rip Raps =

Artificial island, Virginia, U.S.

Coordinates: 36°59′11″N 76°18′02″W

Rip Raps is a small 15 acre (60,000 m^{2}) artificial island at the mouth of the harbor area known as Hampton Roads in the independent city of Hampton in southeastern Virginia in the United States. Its name is derived from the Rip Rap Shoals in Hampton Roads, which also gave their name to a 19th-century criminal gang. In 2020 the island was converted into a bird sanctuary, and routine public access was terminated.

== History ==
=== Hampton Roads harbor defenses ===
Rip Raps was originally built in 1817 as part of the harbor defenses to provide a setting on the south side of the navigation channel for Fort Wool (built originally in 1830 and named Fort Calhoun but renamed during the Civil War and rebuilt in 1902), the companion to Fort Monroe (on the northern side of the channel) in protecting access to Hampton Roads with an anti-submarine net. Fort Wool was decommissioned after World War II. It was ceded to Virginia in 1967, and transferred to Hampton, Virginia.

President Andrew Jackson used it as a retreat, visiting between August 19, 1829 through August 16, 1835.

Rip Raps is located adjacent to one of the unnamed man-made islands of the Hampton Roads Bridge-Tunnel, which was initially completed and opened to traffic in 1957. However, Rip Raps and Fort Wool were accessible to the public by water via harbor tours until 2020.

Rip Raps
- Founding location: Norfolk, Virginia
- Years active: 1850s
- Territory: Hampton, Virginia
- Ethnicity: Non-Irish American
- Membership (est.): ?
- Criminal activities: street fighting, knife fighting assault, murder, robbery, arson, rioting
- Allies: Plug Uglies, Bloody Tubs, Nativists
- Rivals: Baltimore Irish gangs

=== 19th-century criminal gang ===
The Rip Rap shoals in Hampton Roads were likely also the source of the name of the Rip Raps, a notorious Baltimore gang during the Know-Nothing movement. The Baltimore Rip Raps included several sailors familiar with the waters of the Chesapeake Bay. They were affiliated with the American Party and specifically the Plug Uglies, another American gang. The Rip Raps fought several street battles with their sharpest rivals—the Democratic rowdies associated with the New Market Fire Company. At the October 1856 municipal election, the Rip Raps attacked the New Market engine house, leading to two deaths and the wounding of several prominent fighting men. The battle was one of a series of confrontations in the Know-Nothing Riot of 1856 that day and at the ensuing presidential election. The confrontations left seventeen dead. Prominent Rip Raps included Gregory Barrett Jr., William "Kitty" Chambers, Elijah "Boney" Lee, and Marion "Mal" Cropp.

== See also ==
- Fort Wool
- Fort Monroe
