= Fort Wool =

Historic island fortification in Virginia

- Part of Harbor Defenses of Chesapeake Bay 1905–1945
- Rip Raps island between Willoughby Spit and Old Point Comfort, Virginia
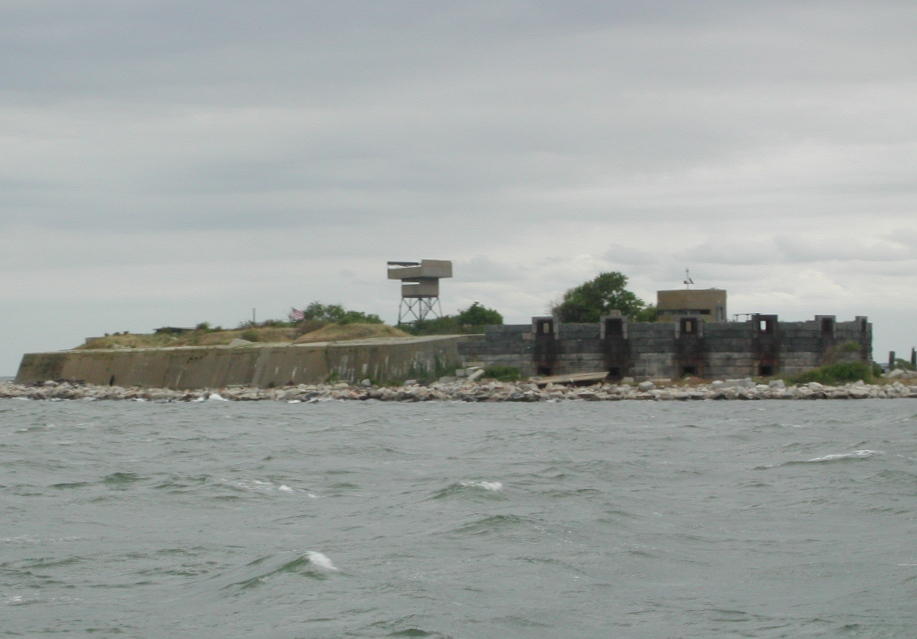
- Fort Wool

Site information
- Type: Sea fort
- Owner: U.S. Government (1818–1953); Commonwealth of Virginia (1953–present)
- Controlled by: United States Army (1818–1953); City of Hampton, Virginia (1953–present)
- Open to the public: No
- Fort Wool
- U.S. National Register of Historic Places
- Virginia Landmarks Register
- Location within Virginia Location within the United States
- Location: Rip Raps island between Willoughby Spit and Old Point Comfort, Hampton, Virginia
- Coordinates: 36°59′12″N 76°18′04″W
- Area: 15 acres (6.1 ha)
- Built: 1819
- Architect: Simon Bernard
- NRHP reference No.: 69000339
- VLR No.: 114-0041

Significant dates
- Added to NRHP: November 25, 1969
- Designated VLR: November 5, 1968

Site history
- Built: 1818–1861
- Built by: United States Army Corps of Engineers
- In use: 1861–present
- Materials: Stone
- Battles/wars: American Civil War; World War I World War II

Fort Wool is a decommissioned island fortification located in the mouth of Hampton Roads, adjacent to the Hampton Roads Bridge-Tunnel (HRBT). Officially known as Rip Raps Island, the fort has an elevation of 7 feet and sits near Old Point Comfort, Old Point Comfort Light, Willoughby Beach and Willoughby Spit, approximately one mile south of Fort Monroe.

Originally named Castle Calhoun or Fort Calhoun after Secretary of War John C. Calhoun, the fort was renamed after Maj. Gen. John Ellis Wool on 18 March 1862 during the American Civil War. It is noted on current nautical maps as "Rip Raps" and was sometimes referred to by that name during the Civil War.

Fort Wool was one of more than 40 forts developed after the War of 1812, when British forces sailed the Chesapeake Bay to burn the Capital. This program was later known as the third system of U.S. fortifications. Designed by Brigadier General of Engineers Simon Bernard, an expatriate Frenchman who had served as a general of engineers under Napoleon, Fort Wool was constructed on a shoal of ballast stones dumped as sailing ships entered Hampton's harbor and was originally intended to have three tiers of casemates and a barbette tier with 216 muzzle-loading cannon, although it never reached this size. Only two-thirds of the fort's bottom two tiers were completed. Fort Wool was built to maintain a crossfire with Fort Monroe, located directly across the channel, thereby protecting the entrance to the harbor.

In 1902, as a result of the Endicott Board's findings, all of the original fort, except for eight casemates at the west end, was demolished and new fortifications were constructed. The new armament, mounted in three batteries of two 6-inch (152 mm) guns each, plus two batteries totaling six 3-inch (76 mm) guns, remained in place for decades, with modifications made from time to time. Only the six original three-inch guns remained in 1942, when two were sent to nearby Fort John Custis on Fisherman Island. A modern battery of two new long-range six-inch guns was constructed over one of the old Endicott period batteries during World War II but was never armed. The fort was decommissioned by the military in 1953.

== History ==
=== Design and construction ===
Brigadier-General of Engineers Simon Bernard was tasked by Secretary of War John C. Calhoun to create or improve fortifications for the protection of vital U.S. ports. Bernard's plan was to build more than forty new forts, including Fort Wool, which he had named Fort Calhoun. The fort was to have three tiers of casemates and a barbette tier with a total of 216 muzzle-loading cannon mounted, and was to be manned by a garrison of 1,000 soldiers. With four tiers, it was planned as the first "tower fort" of the third system, resembling the four-tier Castle Williams in New York harbor. Early plans called it "Castle Calhoun". The fort was effectively a sea fort, as the island had to be built up considerably to accommodate it. The fort was planned as a shallow "V" shape pointing north, with rounded ends. It was to be built on a 15-acre (6.1 ha) artificial island southeast of Old Point Comfort in Hampton, Virginia. Construction got underway in 1819 when crews started dumping granite boulders into the water. It took four years to bring the rock pile up to the 6-foot-tall island called for in the plans, and three more years before the foundation was ready to begin the fort's construction.

Construction of the fort began in 1826, and after considerable delays caused by subsidence of the island, two-thirds of the first level of casemates was finally completed in 1830. Construction continued through 1834, and only half of the second tier was completed. It was then found that Fort Calhoun's foundations had continued settling. Reports to the chief of engineers repeatedly state that the island had stabilized and construction could continue "the next year". In fact, the island continues to settle in the early 21st century. A young second lieutenant and engineer in the U.S. Army, Robert E. Lee was transferred there to assist Captain Andrew Talcott, the U.S. Army engineer in charge of the construction of Fort Wool and its larger companion Fort Monroe, across the channel on the mainland. Lee was given the task of stabilizing the island as his first independent command. He found that the island would not hold the weight of the two tiers of casemates and brought more stone in to stabilize it, but the fort never reached its intended size. Lee found the stone foundation under the fort was the problem and that it could not support the weight of four tiers of the completed fort.

Work on the structure began again in 1858, but the outbreak of the American Civil War in 1861 brought the fort's construction to a halt, with one complete tier and one open-top tier of casemates on about two-thirds of the designed perimeter. The south-facing "gorge" or back of the fort remained open.

=== Civil War ===
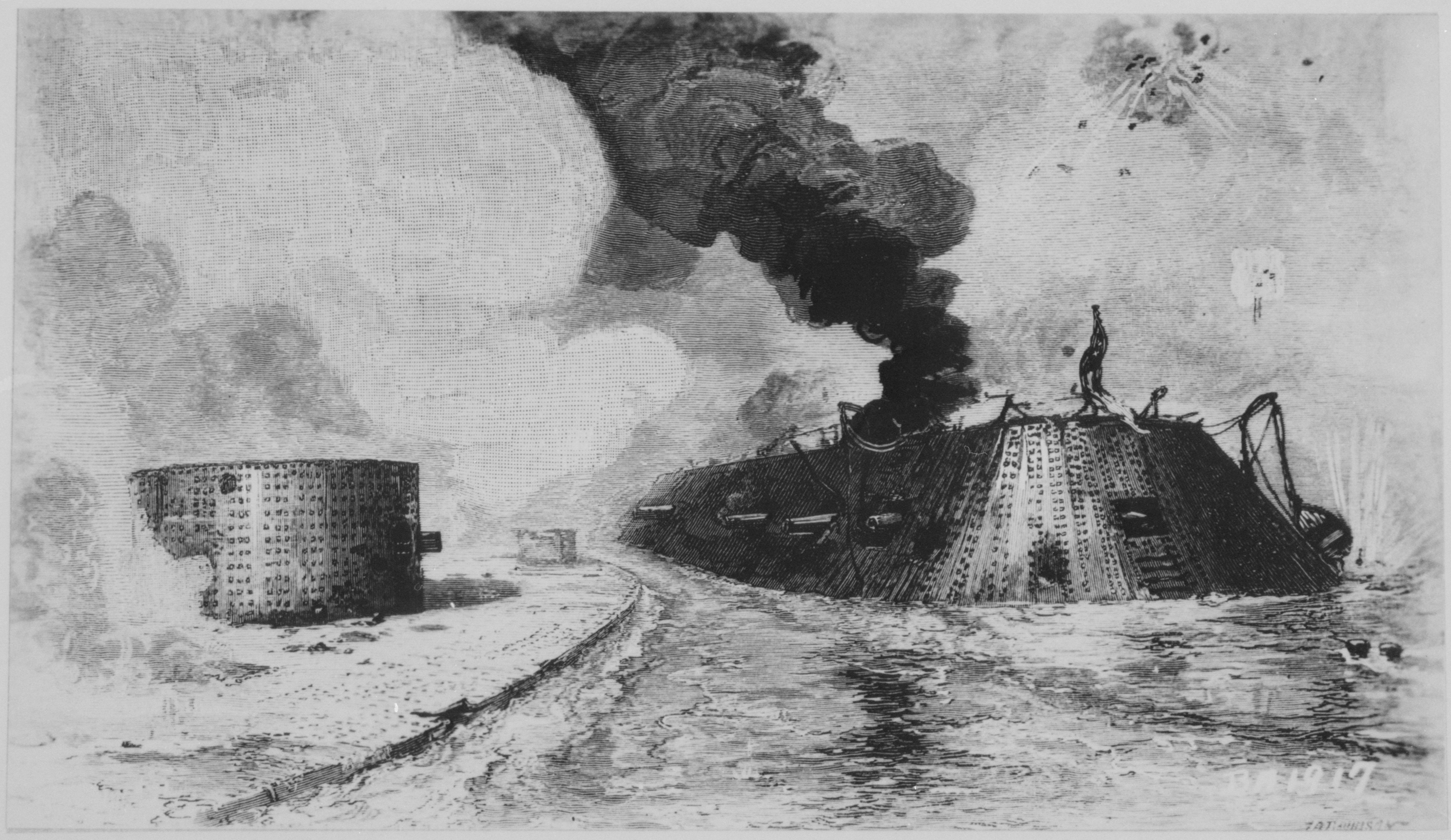
The battle of the ironclads

The fort was originally named after John C. Calhoun, President Monroe's secretary of war who was a Southern politician of secessionist tendencies. In 1862 it was renamed after Maj. Gen. John Ellis Wool, a Mexican War hero and commander at Fort Monroe. The fort was armed during the Civil War, initially with only 10 guns, and fired on Confederate positions and vessels.

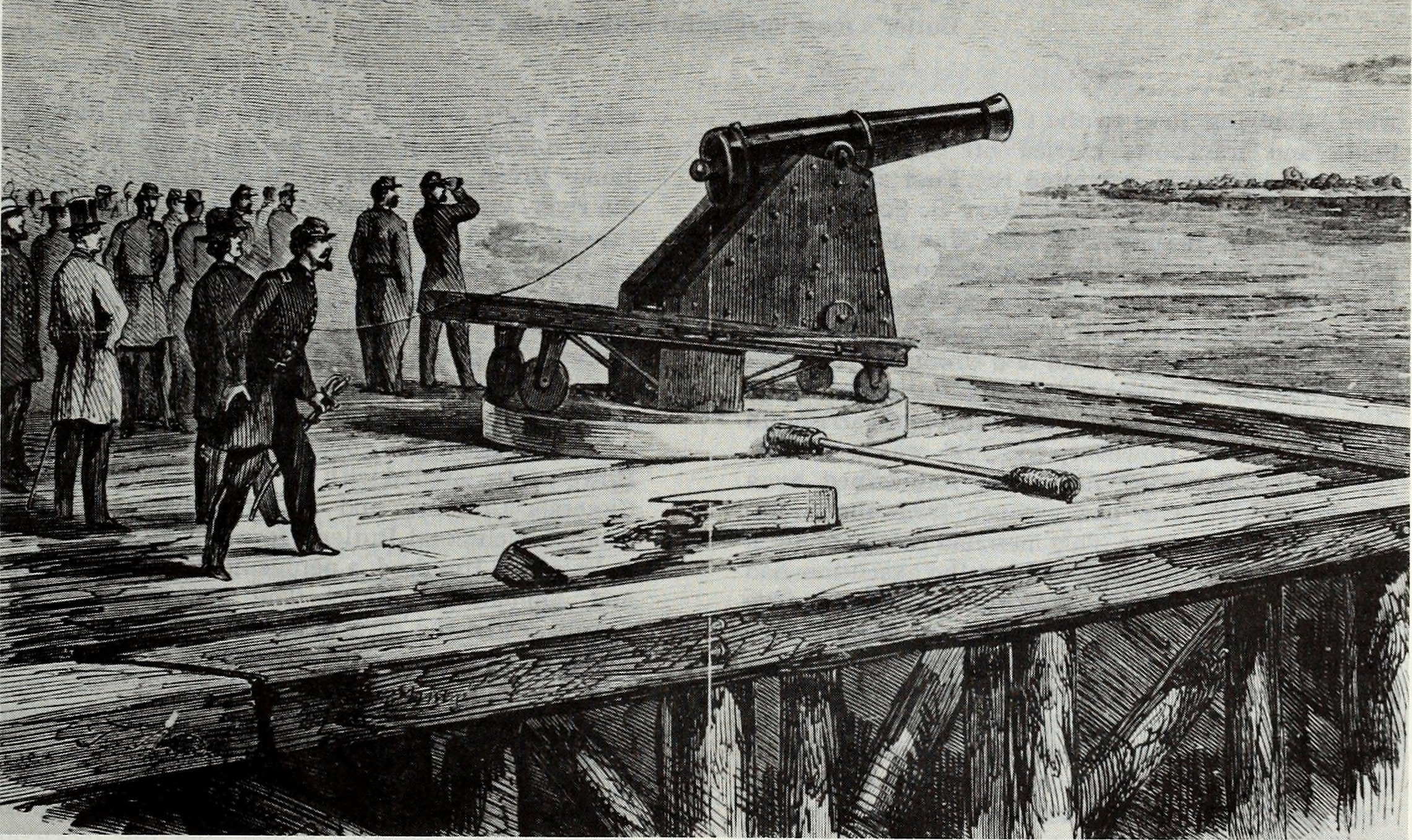
The Sawyer gun being demonstrated by Major General Benjamin Butler for Major General Wool at the Rip Raps (Fort Calhoun), 1861

A long-range experimental cannon, the Sawyer gun, was installed at Fort Calhoun in mid-1861 during the Civil War. The weapon was rifled, and an illustration in an August 1861 newspaper shows it mounted on a high-angle carriage. The range of this weapon extended all the way to Sewell's Point, more than three miles away (where the Norfolk Naval Base is now located), the site of a Confederate earthen fort with bastions and a redan and three artillery batteries totaling 45 guns. The weapon was a rifled 24-pounder (which would fire a projectile of 42–48 pounds), one of several rifled artillery pieces developed by Sylvanus Sawyer; however, none of his designs were widely adopted. A weapon of this type was tested at Fort Monroe in 1859, and two different Sawyer weapons, a 24-pounder rifle and a 3.67-inch, were used in the Siege of Richmond of 1864–65, although the 24-pounder burst at the tenth round and the 3.67-inch rifle was seldom used. The Battle of Hampton Roads took place off Sewells Point on March 8–9, 1862. USS Monitor faced CSS Virginia during the Battle of the Ironclads in 1862. The Sawyer gun also fired at Virginia, although it did no damage to the ironclad's armor.

=== Endicott batteries ===
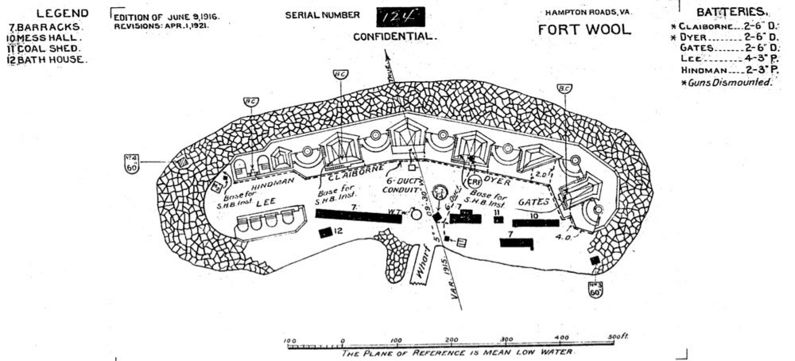
Fort Wool in 1921

In 1885 the Endicott board met to recommend improvements to U.S. coast defenses. At Fort Wool the result was the demolition of all but a small part of the western end of the fort to make room for modern gun emplacements. Five gun batteries were constructed after 1902. Fort Wool was armed with relatively small-caliber, rapid-fire guns because Fort Monroe had numerous large-caliber weapons. The 3-inch guns were intended to defend controlled underwater minefields against minesweepers. Some of the mines (called "torpedoes" at the time) were stored at Fort Wool; the mines were controlled from Fort Monroe.

- Battery Ferdinand Claiborne: two 6-inch (152 mm) guns on disappearing carriages (1908-1918)
- Battery Alexander Dyer: two 6-inch (152 mm) guns on disappearing carriages (1908-1917)
- Battery Horatio Gates: two 6-inch (152 mm) guns on disappearing carriages (1908-1942)
- Battery Henry Lee: four 3-inch (76 mm) rapid-fire guns (1905-1943)
- Battery Jacob Hindman: two 3-inch (76 mm) rapid-fire guns (1905-1946)

=== World War I ===
In 1917 and 1918, all but two of the six-inch guns were removed for potential use as field guns on the Western Front, along with their disappearing carriages. The remaining guns were shifted from Battery Claiborne to Battery Gates.

- Battery Horatio Gates: two 6-inch (152 mm) guns on disappearing carriages (1908-1942)
- Battery Henry Lee: four 3-inch (76 mm) rapid-fire guns (1905-1943)
- Battery Jacob Hindman: two 3-inch (76 mm) rapid-fire guns (1905-1946)
- Anti-submarine nets were stretched across the harbor between Fort Wool and Fort Monroe in both world wars.

=== World War II ===
Battery 229 with two 6-inch (152 mm) shielded guns on long-range carriages was constructed on a rebuilt Battery Horatio Gates from March 1943 to January 1944. The work was completed, and the shielded carriages were installed; however, the gun tubes were not mounted. On 30 September 1943, installation was completed on an SCR-296A radar to provide fire control for Battery 229. The previous 6-inch guns were scrapped in 1942–43. Battery Lee's four 3-inch guns were transferred to Fort Story, two each in 1942 and 1943. Anti-submarine nets were stretched across the harbor between Fort Wool and Fort Monroe in both world wars.

In 1946 Battery Hindman's pair of 3-inch guns were transferred to Fort Monroe as a saluting battery.

== Decommissioning and present ==
The fort was decommissioned in 1953 and given to the Commonwealth of Virginia. In the 1950s, the Hampton Roads Bridge-Tunnel (HRBT) was constructed next to Fort Wool, with its southern island connected to the fort by an earthen causeway. The HRBT opened to traffic in 1957. In 1967 and again in 1970, the city of Hampton developed the fort into a park, accessed by the passenger ferry Miss Hampton II. The fort can also be seen by westbound vehicles on approach to the HRBT southern tunnel, which carries Interstate 64 across the mouth of Hampton Roads.

The island, now called Rip Raps, continues to settle, and occasionally the casemates of the original fortress are off-limits for safety reasons. On 28 April 2007, a garrison flag was raised over Fort Wool for the first time. This took place during a parade of tall ships sailing past the fort, part of the 400th anniversary celebrations of the settlement of Jamestown. In 2020 the fort was converted into a bird sanctuary, and routine public access was terminated.

== See also ==
- Seacoast defense in the United States
- United States Army Coast Artillery Corps
- Harbor Defense Command
