= Know-Nothing Riots in United States politics =

Mid 19th-century nativist riots

The term Know-Nothing Riot refers to a number of political actions by members of the Know Nothing Party in the United States of the mid-19th century. These anti-immigrant and anti-Catholic protests culminated into riots in Philadelphia in 1844; St. Louis in 1854, Cincinnati and Louisville in 1855; Baltimore in 1856; Washington, D.C., and New York City in 1857; and New Orleans in 1858.

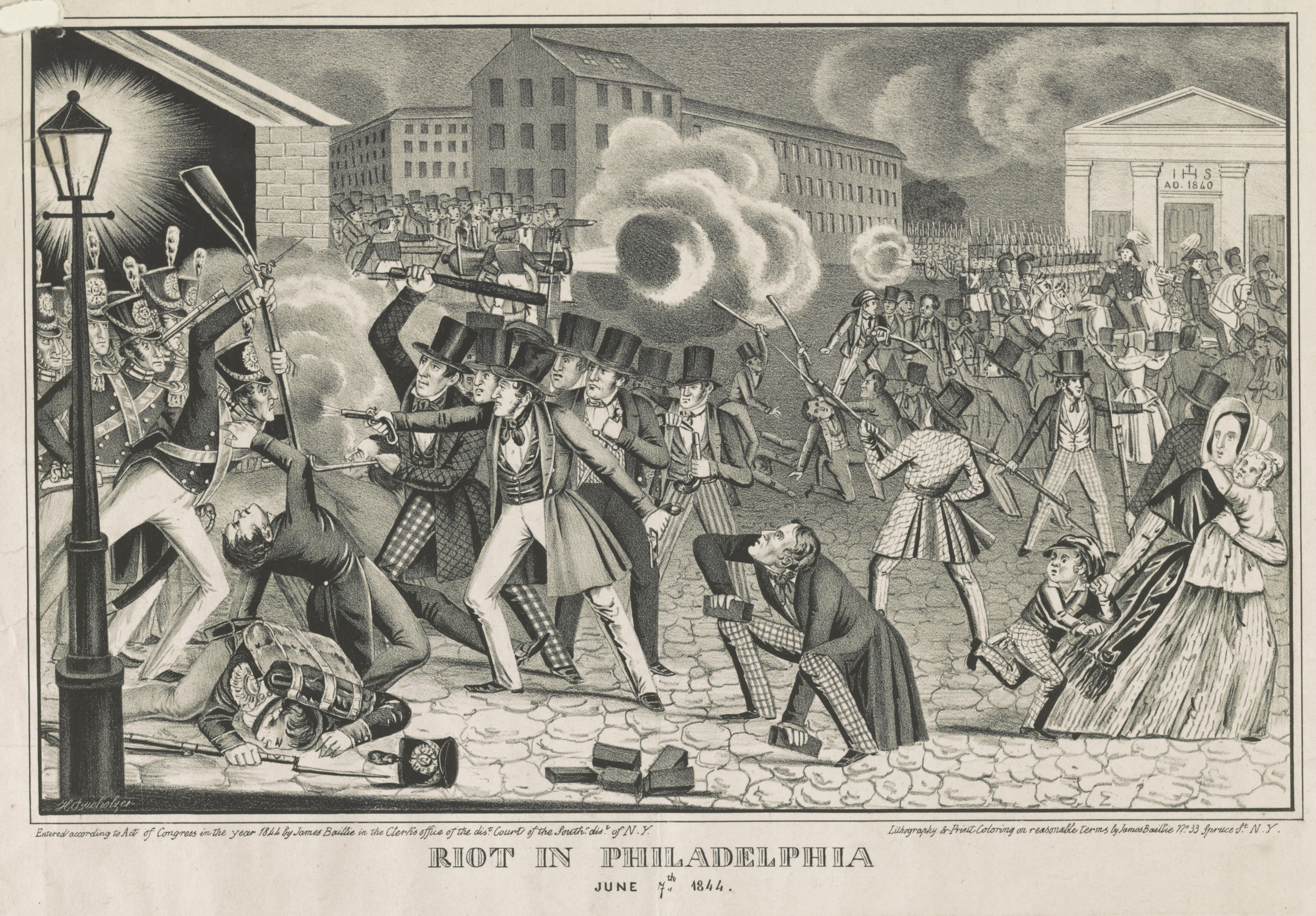
Philadelphia Nativist Riots of 1844, with nativists (center) fighting the militia (left)

== Philadelphia 1844 ==
The Philadelphia nativist riots took place on May 6—8 and July 6—7, 1844, in Philadelphia, and the adjacent suburbs of Kensington and Southwark. The riots were a result of rising anti-Catholic sentiment at the growing population of Irish Catholic immigrants. The state government brought in over a thousand militia—they confronted the nativist mobs and killed or wounded hundreds of anti-Catholic rioters.

In the five months leading to the riots, nativist groups had been spreading a false rumor that Catholics were trying to remove the Bible from public schools. A nativist rally in Kensington erupted in violence on May 6 and started a deadly riot that would result in the destruction of two Catholic churches and numerous other buildings. Riots erupted again in July after it was discovered that St. Philip Neri's Catholic Church in Southwark had armed itself for protection. Fierce fighting broke out between the nativists and the soldiers sent to protect the church, resulting in numerous deaths and injuries. Two of the 13 Catholic churches were burned. The Catholic Church sued the city and won some money for repairs. Civic leaders deplored the nativist attacks. Nationally, the riots helped fuel criticism of the nativist movement, despite denials of responsibility from nativist groups. The riots exposed deficiencies in law enforcement in Philadelphia and the surrounding districts, influencing various reforms in local police departments and the eventual consolidation of the city in 1854.

== St. Louis 1854 ==
In August 1854, a major election riot exploded in St. Louis, Missouri, a city with a population of 95,000. It was caused by the escalation of tensions between Irish Catholic Democrats and the anti-immigrant Know-Nothing movement. Violence came when Know-Nothing activists brought a local judge to the polls and he rejected Irishmen who could not prove their citizenship. Fighting broke out across the inner city, and ended only when 500 armed state militia took control. Ten men were killed and 33 wounded; 93 buildings were damaged by arson. The episode reflected multiple forces at work, including rapid immigration from Europe, the success of local Irish politicians, the nationwide nativist movement, the policies of Democratic Mayor John How, and the bitterly fought contest for House of Representatives between Whig Luther Martin Kennett and Democrat Thomas Hart Benton.

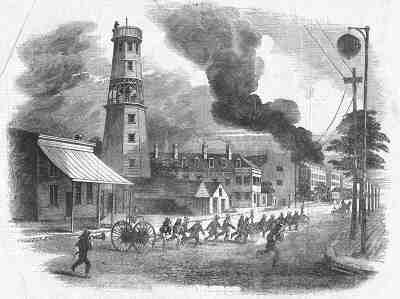
The Cincinnati Nativist Riots of 1855

== Cincinnati 1855 ==
The Election Day Riots of 1855 occurred in Cincinnati between April 2–7, 1855. The election was between James J. Faran, the Democratic contender and editor of the Cincinnati Enquirer, and James D. Taylor, nativist editor of the Cincinnati Times. Rumors of illegal voting, ballot-box stuffing, and naturalized voters preventing native-born citizens from voting sparked the events.

Louisville Bloody Monday Election Riots of 1855

== Louisville 1855 ==
Bloody Monday was a series of riots on August 6, 1855, in Louisville, Kentucky, an election day, when Protestant mobs attacked Irish and German Catholic neighborhoods. These riots grew out of the bitter rivalry between the Democrats and the Nativist Know-Nothing Party. Multiple street fights raged, leaving twenty-two people dead, scores injured, and much property destroyed by fire. Five people were later indicted, but none were convicted, and the victims were not compensated.

== Baltimore 1856 ==
The riots occurred in Baltimore between September and November of that presidential election year. The Know-Nothing Party gained traction in Baltimore as native-born residents feared the rapidly growing Irish and German immigrant population. Local street gangs became divided on political grounds, with the Know-Nothing affiliated gangs clashing with gangs affiliated with the Democratic Party. The partisans were involved in widespread violence at the polls and across Baltimore during municipal and national elections.

Washington. D.C. Election Riot of 1857

== Washington D.C. 1857 ==
Know-Nothing associated gang, the Plug Uglies, had travelled to Washington. D.C.. from Baltimore on June 1, 1857, in an attempt to prevent German and Irish immigrants from voting in the local election. The Plug Uglies linked up with allied members of the Rip Raps and the Chunkers and moved to Mount Vernon Square to harass anti-Know Nothing voters. They then returned to the square armed with pistols, clubs, bricks, and other weapons and charged into the crowd of voters. A brutal fight broke out which the police were unable to stop and by noon, President Buchanan had called out two companies of Marines to stop the riot. By the time the Marines arrived at Mount Vernon Square, the Know-Nothings had set up a barricade and were armed with a cannon they had taken from the Navy Yard. Archibald Henderson, Commandant of the Marine Corps, marched up to the cannon and placed his body in front of it so it could not be aimed at his men. This allowed the Marines to advance on their position, but a fire fight soon broke out. Eight people were killed by the end of the day and at least 15 were injured.

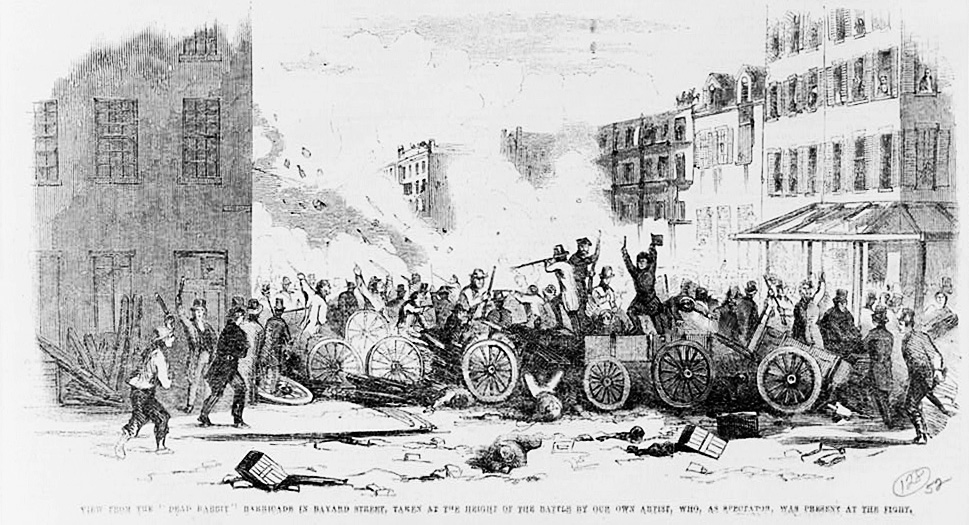
The New York City Dead Rabbits Riot of 1857

== New Orleans 1858 ==
The New Orleans Know-Nothing group began as a local movement in 1858 to reduce what residents considered a high rate of crime and violence in the city, primarily among Irish and German immigrants, who were among the poorest classes. A secret nonpartisan Vigilance Committee was formed to monitor their activities, and in particular to prevent disruption of upcoming municipal elections. On the night of June 2, 1858, the Vigilance Committee sent armed men led by J.K. Duncan to Jackson Square. They seized The Cabildo and its arsenal, and occupied it for the next five days. Their goal was to prevent violence. A standoff existed between the "Vigilance Committee" and members of the Native American Party. On June 7, the elections were held and the Native American candidate, Gerard Stith, defeated the Democratic Party candidate, P.G.T. Beauregard. The Vigilance Committee disbanded. There was no violence.

== Notable Know Nothing groups involved in riots ==
- American Guards (New York City)
- Atlantic Guards (New York City)
- Blood Tubs (Baltimore and Philadelphia)
- Bowery Boys (New York City)
- Killers (Philadelphia)
- O'Connell Guards (New York City)
- Plug Uglies (Baltimore, Philadelphia, and New York City)
- Roach Guards (New York City)
- Shifflers (Philadelphia)

== See also ==
- Know-Nothing Party
- Anti-Catholicism in the United States
- List of incidents of civil unrest in the United States
