= Henry Stump =

American judge (1795–1865)

- Born: December 28, 1795
- Died: October 29, 1865 (aged 69); Cecil County, Maryland
- Occupation: Judge

Henry Stump (1795–1865) served as Judge of the Criminal Court, 5th Judicial Circuit in Baltimore, Maryland, United States, from 1851 to 1860, one of the most lawless and politically violent decades in Baltimore history. He presided over the infamous trial of Plug-Ugly Henry Gambrill for the murder of a Baltimore police officer. In 1860, the Maryland General Assembly removed Stump from office for "misbehavior," the only jurist in Maryland history to be removed from the bench. Stump was also an eyewitness to the April 19, 1861 riots in Baltimore that marked the first bloodshed in the American Civil War.

Stump was the brother of John Stump of Cecil County, Maryland, brother-in-law of Mary Alicia Stump and uncle of Henry Arthur Stump (1857–1934). The latter served as Judge to the Baltimore City Supreme Bench from 1910 to 1934. Henry Stump's Baltimore office was located at 57 West Fayette Street and his residence at Barnum's Hotel. According to the American Almanac, he earned a salary of $2,000 per year. Stump died on October 29, 1865, at his brother's Cecil County home.

== Baltimore in the 1850s ==
Between 1790 and 1860, Baltimore's population increased from 13,000 to 200,000, making it the third largest city in the United States. The Bank crisis in the 1830s, large numbers of European immigrants (a quarter of the population by 1860), a large free black population (25,000 in 1860), as well as slavery, created economic and political tensions. In addition, the "state's 1851 constitution altered traditional political alignments in Maryland, and on the national front, the struggle over the Compromise of 1850 gravely injured Maryland's political equilibrium. The subsequent dissolution of the Whig Party in the 1852 national elections left many Marylanders in the lurch. These voters turned to prohibition and nativism as answers to the problems facing their communities. By 1854, the Know-Nothing, or American, Party seized the reins of mayoral power in Baltimore, marking the rise of one of America's most unusual third parties." In 1855, the American Party won power in the Baltimore City Council, the General Assembly and the Maryland delegation to Congress.

The American Party, representing nativist, anti-immigrant views, was associated with gangs such as the Plug Uglies which "practiced intimidation, assault, arson, and assassination." Much of the gang activity in Baltimore was political in nature: intimidation at the polls, for example. Immigrant and Catholic social clubs were organized by the Democratic Party (which was pro-slavery and sympathetic to the South) which competed for power with the American Party. This conflict resulted in violence "in which scores of participants were killed and hundreds wounded. The large number of casualties made the American Party years some of the most violent in the city's history. The rates of criminal homicide would not be exceeded for another 100 years."

In the midst of the political turmoil and violence, Plug-Ugly member Henry Gambrill was arrested and convicted for the murder of Baltimore police officer Benjamin Benton. As Tracy Melton writes,

[w]ithin a single month the city had seen raw intimidation prevent the holding of a free and fair election and the assassination of a member of the police force because of his testimony at the criminal court. Violence was no longer merely an aspect of the rough culture on the city's streets, a friction in the transaction of daily affairs, entertainment for some, a nuisance for others, but only occasionally disruptive. It now threatened life and property, imperiled civil rights, and endangered the administration of justice and the rule of law. Demands for reform and an end to the violence plaguing the city resulted in the conviction and hanging of Gambrill and a beginning to the end of the political-based violence.

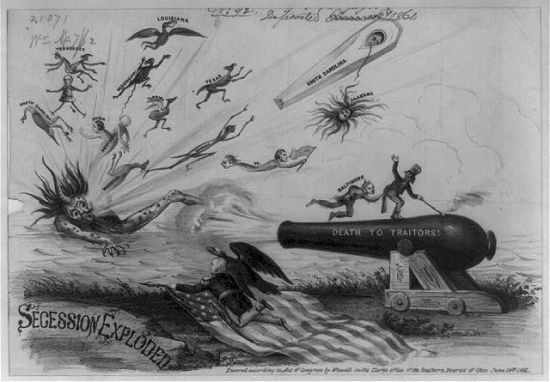
Secession Exploded: "This strongly anti-Confederate satire is a fantastical vision of the Union defeat of the secessionist movement. A hideous monster representing secession emerges from the water at left. He is hit by a charge from a mammoth cannon 'Death to Traitors!' operated by Uncle Sam (right). A two-faced figure representing Baltimore, whose allegiance to the Union was at least questionable during the war, pulls at Uncle Sam's coattails. The explosion sends several small demons, representing the secessionist states, hurling through the air. Prominent among them is South Carolina, in a coffin at upper right. Tennessee and Kentucky, two Southern states internally divided over the secession question, are represented by two-headed creatures. Virginia, though part of the Confederacy, is also shown divided – probably an acknowledgment of the Appalachian and eastern regions' alignment with the Union. Among the demons is a small figure of Tennessee senator and 1860 presidential candidate John Bell, with a bell-shaped body. In the foreground is a large American flag on which Winfield Scott, commander of the Union forces, and a bald eagle rest. William Wiswell, Library of Congress Reproduction Number Reproduction Number: LC-USZ62-89738

Baltimore, just prior to the Civil War, was "at a crucial moment of transformation. Its politics were raw and corrupt, its civic services and justice system underdeveloped and unprofessional. Out of the resulting carnage came reforms ..." After the 1859 election-related violence,

the Reform Association asked the General Assembly's new Democratic majority to clean up what one delegate called a 'God-Forsaken and God-accursed city.' Reformers successfully lobbied for passage of the Baltimore Bills, laws that gave the state control over the city's police, militia volunteers, and juries and reduced crowds at polling places by subdividing each ward into four election precincts. Citing fraud and intimidation at Baltimore's polls, the legislature unseated the city's representatives. It also dismissed a criminal court judge, Henry Stump, who habitually acquitted Know-Nothing defendants.

In 1860, Baltimore voters elected as mayor reform candidate George William Brown, who had called for

establishment of professional police and fire departments in Baltimore; the sentencing of juvenile delinquents to the House of Reform as opposed to prison; the end of 'straw bail'; and tougher punishments for adults criminals. Brown also advocated stricter rules for the pardoning of criminals.

"The election of George William Brown to mayor of Baltimore marked the beginning of the end of a long streak of political violence, perhaps unique in American history."

== Removal from the Bench ==
Stump was elected in 1851 to serve a ten-year term to the 5th Judicial Circuit but was removed from office in 1860 for "misbehavior." Stump's removal is the only case in Maryland history in which the complicated procedure (initiated in the Constitution of 1851) for electing judges to office and removal of them "by address to the General Assembly" has been carried out.

Watkins v. The State of Maryland: "Incurable Judicial Blunder"

The misconduct case against Stump included charges that he repeatedly appeared in court drunk and as a result of his drunkenness was late to court, took frequent lengthy breaks and adjourned early, to the detriment of the business of the court. "Even if the police could be persuaded to arrest someone, the American judge of the criminal court, the notoriously corrupt and alcoholic Henry Stump, was likely to let them go."

Stump was also accused of passing erroneous judgments such as in the case of Thomas M. Watkins, a free Negro convicted of simple larceny in Stump's court. Watkins was tried and found guilty of stealing a silver watch valued at $6. Stump then sentenced Watkins as follows:

Judgment – to be sold for the period of five years out of the limits of the State, from March 31, 1859.

The guidelines for sentencing free Negroes in cases of simply larceny of $5 and more, found in the Act of 1858, chapter 324, stipulated that "they should be sentenced and sold at public sale, as slaves, for the period of not less than two, nor more than five years." Charles E. Phelps, counsel for Watkins, claimed that the "Court has no power to sentence the party to be sold 'out of the limits of the State.'" Basically, Stump sentenced Watkins to be sold out of state and did not have the authority to do so. In the judgment above, Stump also neglected to specify a public sale (as opposed to private) according to law.

Furthermore, Stump's critics accused him of amending the judgment before sending it to the Court of Appeals upon a writ of error from the Circuit Court of Baltimore. The judgment in the record transmitted to the Court of Appeals read as follows:

Therefore, it is considered by the Court here, that the said free Negro, Thomas Watkins, be sold out of the State of Maryland, at public sale, as a slave for the period of five years, under the provisions of the Act of Assembly in such case made and provided.

The Opinion of the Court of Appeals (which reversed the judgment on July 29, 1859) reads:

Without intending to impute unworthy motives to any one, we have no hesitation in saying that the judgment that was actually rendered by the court in this case, pronounced in the presence of the prisoner, entered upon the docket and transmitted to the sheriff under the solemnity of the court's seal, to be executed by him, is not the same judgment set out in the record and originally transmitted to this court for review. The discrepancy between the two is obvious and material.

Stump's defense claimed that "the judgment extended in the Record, is nothing more than a technical amplification of the docket entry according to its legal meaning and effect."

In response, Phelps contended that

the question is submitted to the court whether it is not, on the contrary, an ex gratia and unwarranted interpolation of matter of substance – an ex post facto clerical amendment of an incurable judicial blunder." And furthermore, "the judgment in this case is not only a piece of arbitrary judicial usurpation, but inasmuch as it gratuitously deprives this negro of the protection of the laws just cited, the benefit of which is expressly secured to him by the 3rd Art. of the Declaration of Rights, it assumes the graver aspect of a cruel or careless violation of a sacred and chartered right.

The Court of Appeals reversed another judgment and sentence from Stump's court – the trial of William G. Ford for the alleged murder of Thomas H. Burnham – and ordered Stump to try him again. Stump forcefully challenged the Court of Appeals, claiming it did not have the authority to make such an order. Stump wrote: "If you, learned Judges, will refer me to the Acts of Assembly, I will obey your order to try Ford over again. You say there are such acts, of course you ought to show them, otherwise I am not bound to obey them." More than a hint of Stump's sarcasm or perhaps disdain is evident when he writes: "Allow me to assure you (in order to tranquilize your nerves and satisfy your religious influences that Ford had as fair a trial as any man ever tried in this State or in the world." Stump goes on to chide the Appeals Court:

Let me beg you judges to consult the Governor, perhaps he will pardon or hang him without another trial, which I certainly never will give him, until I see your authority by Act of Assembly. If Ford escapes by the decision of your honorable court, I am glad of it. You will gain great credit like Caesar for his clemency and your court become more popular than ever.

Removal Proceedings

A joint committee of the House of Delegates and the Senate heard a parade of witnesses testify both for and against Judge Stump on the question of whether or not he should be removed from office. Witnesses against complained that the judge was frequently drunk and would occasionally fall asleep on the Bench; that he was late for Court and adjourned early; displayed vulgar behavior; erroneously passed judgments; and irresponsibly delegated tasks to clerks. "He had refused to fine anyone more than once a year for violations of the Sunday liquor laws and had accepted straw bail from John Hinsley and other disreputable figures," writes Melton. Stump did not help his case when, in Annapolis for his hearing, he "exchanged insults with the senator from Allegany County and had then struck him with his cane."

Here are some examples of the testimony against Stump:

I have seen him drunk on the bench in the trial of cases repeatedly; his demeanor on the bench is at times vulgar. At one time I heard the judge, who had before him two women who had been fighting: it appeared that one of them called the other a 'whore,' he told them that if they came back again he would send them to jail where they could not whore any, and he repeated it two or three times in course language.

— Thomas Creamer

His general bearing as a Judge was undignified, and upon one occasion during my term of service, the grand jury deemed it necessary to remonstrate with him and protest against his leniency towards the most notorious violators of the law, and his demeanor as a Judge was a matter of common remark and jest with the members of the grand jury.

— George E. Sangston

At the close of last September term, with eight murder cases, and over seventy assaults with intent to murder, pending and untried, whilst much under the influence of liquor, he continued them all to January term, refusing to sit any longer and try them.

— Joseph M. Peregoy

Within the past twelve months I do not remember to have seen him make a single note of the testimony, although some ten or twelve murder cases have been disposed of before him.

— J.D. Hambleton

The witnesses in his favor were as varied as to class and profession but most focused on saying they had not seen him drunk on the Bench during a specific period of time. Here are examples of the testimony:

Judge Stump throughout the whole time presided with dignity, and I think with ability. He was not intoxicated, and I am certain not under the influence of liquor.

— Elias Ellicott

Speaking to the accusation that Stump had used the term "whore" in court:

The Judge in discharging the parties remarked that persons who followed that business should keep quiet and not fight, and if they were caught fighting again he would put them where they could not fight any more, did not hear the Judge say that he would put them where they could not whore.

— A. Bond Jarrett

I never saw him intoxicated on the bench or off the bench, during my term of office. I never heard him use any vulgar language on the bench. I was elected, in 1853, by the temperance party, or on the temperance ticket, being nominated as their candidate for Sheriff. ... I went into office rather prejudiced against Judge Stump, but was agreeably disappointed when I found that he endeavored to enforce, as far as he could, the observance of the laws against the Sunday traffic in liquor.

— Samuel Hindes

Witnesses testifying against Stump:

- Thomas Creamer, Sheriff of Baltimore City (1857–59)
- Thomas Gardner, clerk of the Criminal Court
- Lawrence Sangston, foreman of the Grand Jury during the January 1859 term
- Benjamin Robins, juryman in the Criminal Court
- John P. Poe, lawyer practicing in the Criminal Court
- Sheppard A. Leakin, lawyer practicing in the Criminal Court
- George E. Sangston, member of the grand jury in 1856 and 1857
- George E. Dodge, member of the grand jury in various years of 1850s
- Robert Renwick, member of the petit jury of the Criminal Court
- Albert Ritchie, practitioner of law in the Criminal Court
- Joseph M. Peregoy, reporter for the Baltimore Sun
- J.D. Hambleton, practitioner of law in the Criminal Court

Witnesses for the Defense:

- John S. Pontier, Deputy Sheriff, City of Baltimore
- Daniel H. McPhail, juror, witness and spectator in the Criminal Court
- Elias Ellicott, juror in the Criminal Court during the May 1859 session
- Joshua M. Myers, Interpreter, Baltimore Criminal Court
- Asberry Bond Jarrett, member of the petit jury of the Criminal Court
- Michael S. Norman, foreman of the Grand Jury for consecutive years
- John E. Evans, reporter for the Patriot newspaper
- Columbus W. Windsor, Deputy Sheriff
- Dr. E.S. Thomas, physician of the city jail
- Joseph W. Sadler, bailiff in the Criminal Court
- Thomas C. James, warden of Baltimore City Jail
- William Alexander, member, Baltimore bar
- William H. Davis, deputy sheriff
- Thomas C. Elliott, occupation, general huckster
- W.A. Glanville, student at law
- George W. Westwodd, clerk
- Robert M. Bean, inspector of liquors
- John G. Wilmot, Crier of the Superior Court and member of the bar
- George W. Sheffield, shipwright
- William H. Stewart, wharfinger
- Samuel I. Houston, book keeper
- Joathan H. Ellicott, commission agent
- Thomas Pindell, wood agent for the works on Canton
- Samuel Hindes, former sheriff Baltimore city (elected on the temperance party ticket)
- T. Joseph Rogers, attorney practicing in the Criminal Court
- Richard Lilly, saddler
- William H. Jenkins, juror
- George W.P. Smith, former prosecuting attorney for Worcester County
- Robert McAllister, attorney practicing in the Criminal Court
- William Chestnut, grocer, member of Grand Jury

After hearing testimony, the Select Committee made the recommendation that Henry Stump be removed from office. While conceding that their hearing did not constitute a criminal trial, their conclusion was that the state of facts "amount to such misbehavious in office, as requires immediate action." Notably, they found:

- Stump "has acted, while in the discharge of his official duties, in a gross, vulgar and undignified manner, especially to the members of the bar and other parties in his Court."
- "That he has been in the habitual use of intoxicating drinks, to an extent which disqualifies him for the prompt and impartial administration of justice."
- "That he has pursued a course, violative of his official oath, in refusing to obey the orders of the Court of Appeals, and indicated, by sneering remarks on the bench, his disposition to treat the action of said Court with derision and contempt."
- "That he has, from time to time, delegated to the officers of his Court discretionary powers in discharging indictments, compromising fines, as has in fact rendered his Court utterly inefficient for the protection of public morals and public peace."

Minority Report

The Minority Report of the joint committee, written by Coleman Yellott, objected not on grounds of Stump's merit, but that the committee had overstepped its authority by removing Stump without a conviction in a court of law. Although the state constitution authorized removal either: 1) by conviction in court of law, or 2) "by the Governor, upon the address of the General Assembly, provided that two-thirds of all the members of each House concur in said Address," Yellott said that the committee had acted as if it were a court of law and Stump did not get a fair hearing. "It would be strange indeed, if a case like the present, involving as it does such important rights, should be the only exception to this universal rule [of a fair trial], and that the same constitution which guaranties to a party a trial, where he has involved property to the amount of 'five dollars,' should authorize a judgment against him without trial where the effect of the judgment would be to deprive him of a future salary amounting in the aggregate to nearly four thousand dollars!"

The General Assembly acted upon the majority opinion and, upon approval by two-thirds of both houses, petitioned Governor Thomas Hicks for Stump's removal. The governor responded to the General Assembly ordering Stump's removal from office as follows:

Executive Chamber,

Annapolis, March 10, 1860.

To the General Assembly of Maryland:

Gentlemen: I have received from a joint committee of the two Houses of the General Assembly, an address to the Governor, concurred in by two-thirds of each House, requesting me "to remove Henry Stump from the office of Judge of the Criminal Court of Baltimore.

I find myself compelled to accede to this request; and I now inform the General Assembly that, in pursuance of their address, I will remove Judge Stump from the Criminal Court of Baltimore.

THO. H. HICKS.

Which was read.

Stump's Case Prompts Proposed Constitutional Amendment – Reforms After 100 Years

Four years after Stump's removal, at the state Constitutional Convention, an amendment to the state constitution was proposed to ensure a fair trial in such cases as Stump's. The amendment was rejected (see below):

The PRESIDENT, The Chair has a full recollection of the case referred to. Judge Stump had a full trial and was allowed to appear by counsel.

Mr. THOMAS. The action in that case may be followed as a precedent, but not necessarily so.

Mr. EARLE. Judge Stump had a full trial under the present Constitution. When we come to consider the article on the judiciary I shall have no objection to making it obligatory that the person charged shall have due notice and opportunity for trial.

Mr. MILLER. I am in favor of the proposed amendment, because the great object of this article in the Declaration of Rights is to secure the independence of the judiciary. If there is ever to be a judge in Maryland, tried or impeached for misconduct, and the Legislature undertake to do it, I want it to be done under a general law, so that every Judge may come in the same category. I know that in the case of the trial of Judge Stump, every opportunity was given him to defend himself, and his case was tried fairly, and an impartial decision rendered upon it. But It may not be so hereafter in all cases, and I wish this provision to be inserted in the bill of rights. The reference made by the gentleman from Allegany (Mr. Thruston) to the article on the judiciary does not remove the difficulty at all, because the words there are; precisely the same as those used in the hill (sic) of rights.

Removable for misbehavior, on conviction in a court of law, or by the Governor, on the address of the General Assembly, provided that two thirds of the members of each House shall concur in such address."

Now I want some general law, providing for full notice, and a fair trial, and I want it in both places, in the Declaration of Rights and the article on the judiciary. The question was stated to be upon the amendment of Mr. JONES, of Somerset, to insert after the words "General Assembly" the words after such notice and trial by the General Assembly as shall be prescribed by general law.

The question being then taken, the amendment was not agreed to.

However, the question of fair treatment for judges charged with misconduct or incompetence was taken up again, nearly 100 years later. In 1966, the state of Maryland adopted a judicial conduct commission to provide for disciplining of judges via a permanent agency with authority to review complaints, conduct investigations and hearings, and make disciplinary recommendations to the Court of Appeals. Prior to establishment of the commission, Maryland judges were subject to the constitutional methods for removal (removal by the Governor; impeachment; or by two-thirds vote of the General Assembly) or to informal tactics such as peer pressure. The commission is intended to provide judges procedural protection as well as protection from impeachment methods that could be by their very nature political or partisan and "it permits judges to enforce unpopular laws or protect unpopular views without fear of reprisal from the legislative or executive branches."

== Eyewitness to the Baltimore Riot of 1861 ==
On April 19, 1861, when the Massachusetts Sixth Regiment marched through Baltimore en route to Washington, "more than 5,000 Baltimoreans took part in the attacks on Federal troops, which resulted in the deaths of 21 soldiers and civilians and more than 100 injuries." By the time of the riot, political power had shifted away from the pro-Union Know-Nothing Party and was back in the hands of Democrats. At least part of the uproar over Union troops passing through was aimed at their association with the hated Know-Nothings than with Southern sentiment. Frank Towers writes, "[t]he ascendancy of Southern sympathizers in late April owed more to their control of the means of violence – as manifested in the actions of police, militia volunteers, and federal employees – than in did to a non-existent majority sentiment for secession."

Secession sentiment did exist in Baltimore (see image) although it was largely among wealthy merchants and slave owners worried about their economic well-being if Southern trade were cut off. They attempted to draw in working-class immigrants who had been victims of the Know-Nothing nativist sentiment. To many in the border city of Baltimore, the issue was not simply North versus South. Rather the choice was secession (which few favored) or the "lesser evil [of] living under a federal administration they thoroughly disliked and one that might soon return their enemies to power." (118) "Long the targets of nativist politicians, some Irish workers allied with these wealthy Southern sympathizers rather than cast their lot with former enemies that now dominated the Union movement." And as William Evitts writes, "Marylanders valued the union; more, they loved and needed it, and could not conceive of existence without it. Yet they clearly perceived the threat of federal dissolution. They therefore faced a double crisis: to preserve the union while preparing themselves to make a choice if they failed."

Henry Stump, out of office and out of power, witnessed the events of April 19 and wrote the following letter to Mary Alicia Stump, wife of his brother John:

Mrs Mary A Stump

Perryville Cecil County

Maryland

Balto April 20, 1861 Saturday

Mrs MA Stump

Dr Mdam

I received your acceptable letter last evening. Being uncertain whether the mail will be sent on the road to day, I have conduced to answer briefly, to assure you that I am satisfied with the management you made to send Pauline to St. Innigoes Academy, but I was disappointed & vexed at the time. I had made up my mind to go with her for fear of accidents. I sincerely believe you would do as much for her as for one of your own children, and have often told her you cared more for her than for any of your own family.

I hope to pay you a visit next week, but I cannot remain in the Country for fear of losing my residence in the City, where I still have some prospects before me.

The whole city is in a state of disorder and excitement. I was on Pratt St yesterday when the conflict betwixt the rioters and the Northern soldiers took place. The soldiers bore the pelting of the pitiless mob for a long time under a full trot, & more than three of them were knocked & shot down, before they returned the assaults; Then they fired about twenty five shots which killed several of their assailants and dispersed them. I saw three of the soldiers dead & dying being about half a square from the scene of the uproar.

We are in an awful state now. The Governor and mayor have called nout {sic} our volunteers to assist the Police in keeping order. Where this confusion will end no on can predict; But while there is life there is hope.

I must finish in time for the mail to day, I have ordered 1/2 doz fruit trees to be sent by the Phila RR directed to John Stump Perryville & Three of them are the bearing mulberry & 3 early apple trees. If he will not plant them get Johny to do it. Plant them about the school house & colts stable where they will not obstruct the view from the house.

In haste yours Truly

Hy Stump

== Sources ==
- Archives of Maryland Biographical Series: Henry Arthur Stump. Maryland State Archives SC 3520-14411.
- Brown, George William. Baltimore and the Nineteenth of April, 1861: A Study of the War. Baltimore: Johns Hopkins University Press, 2001 (1887). With introduction to the 2001 edition by Kevin Conley Ruffner.
- Elfenbein, Jessica, John R. Breihan, Thomas L. Hollowak. From Mobtown to Charm City: New Perspectives on Baltimore's Past. Baltimore: Maryland Historical Society, 2004.
- Evitts, William J. A Matter of Allegiances: Maryland from 1850 to 1861. Baltimore: Johns Hopkins University Press, 1974.
- Evitts, William J. "In Review, Hanging Henry Gambrill," Urbanite, #26, August 2006.
- Harrell Jr., Judge Glenn T. "The Maryland Commission on Judicial Disabilities: Whither Thou Goest?," The Law Forum. University of Baltimore School of Law. Spring 1996. Issue 26.2, pp. 3–14.
- Journal of the Proceedings of the House of Delegates, January Session, One Thousand Eight Hundred and Sixty. Annapolis: Elihu S. Riley, 1860. The Removal of Baltimore City Criminal Court Judge Henry Stump, 1860, Maryland State Archives Govpub Image No: 821075-0001 – 0011. MSA SC 5339-41-8.
- Melton, Tracy Matthew. Hanging Henry Gambrill: The Violent Career of Baltimore's Plug Uglies, 1854-1860. Baltimore: Maryland Historical Society, 2005.
- Minority Report of the Select Committee Appointed on the Part of the Senate in Relation to the Petition for the Removal of Judge Stump. Document AA. By the Senate, March 5, 1860. The Removal of Baltimore City Criminal Court Judge Henry Stump, 1860, Maryland State Archives Govpub Image No: 812303-0001 – 0003. MSA SC 5339-41-8.
- "Opinion of Judge Henry Stump of Baltimore City in the case of the State vs. Ford." Document JJ. By the House of Delegates, March 5, 1860. The Removal of Baltimore City Criminal Court Judge Henry Stump, 1860, Maryland State Archives Govpub Image No: 812267-0001-0004. MSA SC 5339-41-8.
- Proceedings and Debates of the 1864 Constitutional Convention. Volume 102, Volume 1, Debates 363. Maryland State Archives Special Collection.
- Proceedings of the House, 1860, Volume 660, p 897.
- Report of the Select Subcommittee Appointed on the Part of the Senate in Relation to the Petition for the Removal of Judge Stump. Document Z. By the Senate, March 1, 1860. The Removal of Baltimore City Criminal Court Judge Henry Stump, 1860, Maryland State Archives Govpub Image No: 812302-0001 – 3. MSA SC 5339-41-8.
- Scharf, Col. J. Thomas. The Chronicles of Baltimore; Being a Complete History of "Baltimore Town" and Baltimore City from the Earliest Period to the Present Time. Baltimore: Turnbull Brothers, 1874.
- Stump, Henry. "An Eyewitness to the Baltimore Riot, 19th April, 1861," Letter from Henry Stump to Mrs. Mary A. Stump, Maryland Historical Magazine, Vol. 53, No. 4, December 1958, pp. 402–3.
- Testimony in the Case of Judge Stump Before a Joint Committee of the Legislature. Document N. By the Senate, February 20, 1860. The Removal of Baltimore City Criminal Court Judge Henry Stump, 1860. Maryland State Archives Govpub Image No. 812288-0001 – 36. MSA SC 5339-41-8.
- The American Almanac and Repository of Useful Knowledge, For the Year 1857. Boston: Crosby, Nichols, and Company, 1856.
- The Archivists' Bulldog: Newsletter of the Maryland State Archives, Vol. 17, No. 19.
- Thomas M. Watkins, (Free Negro) vs. The State. Court of Appeals of Maryland. 14 Md. 412; 1859 Md. Lexis 87. July 29, 1859, Decided. Maryland State Archives. Special Collection 5339-41-8.
- Towers, Frank. The Urban South and the Coming of the Civil War. Charlottesville: University of Virginia Press, 2004.
- Wood's Baltimore Directory for 1856-57 "Archives of Maryland, Volume 0544, Page 0329 – Woods' Baltimore Directory for 1856–57". Msa.md.gov. 2009-10-23.
