= Gangs of New York (1938 film) =

1938 film by James Cruze

- Directed by: James Cruze
- Written by: Herbert Asbury (book); Samuel Fuller (screenplay); Samuel Fuller (story); Charles F. Royal (writer); Wellyn Totman (writer); Jack Townley (writer); Nathanael West (uncredited)
- Produced by: Armand Schaefer (producer)
- Starring: See below
- Cinematography: Ernest Miller
- Edited by: William Morgan
- Music by: Alberto Colombo
- Distributed by: Republic Pictures
- Release date: May 23, 1938
- Running time: 67 minutes 53 minutes (edited American TV version)
- Country: United States
- Language: English

Gangs of New York is a 1938 American film directed by James Cruze and written by Samuel Fuller.

== Plot ==
Crime lord Rocky Thorpe is impersonated by police officer John Franklin in order to infiltrate his organization and bring an end to it once and for all.

== Cast ==
- Charles Bickford as Rocky Thorpe/John Franklin
- Ann Dvorak as Connie Benson
- Alan Baxter as 'Dapper' Mallare
- Wynne Gibson as Orchid
- Harold Huber as Panatella
- Willard Robertson as Inspector Sullivan
- Maxie Rosenbloom as Tombstone
- Charles Trowbridge as District Attorney Lucas
- John Wray as Maddock
- Jonathan Hale as Warden
- Fred Kohler as Kruger
- Howard Phillips as Al Benson
- Robert Gleckler as Nolan
- Elliott Sullivan as Hopkins
- Maurice Cass as Phillips
