= Plug Uglies =

American street gang

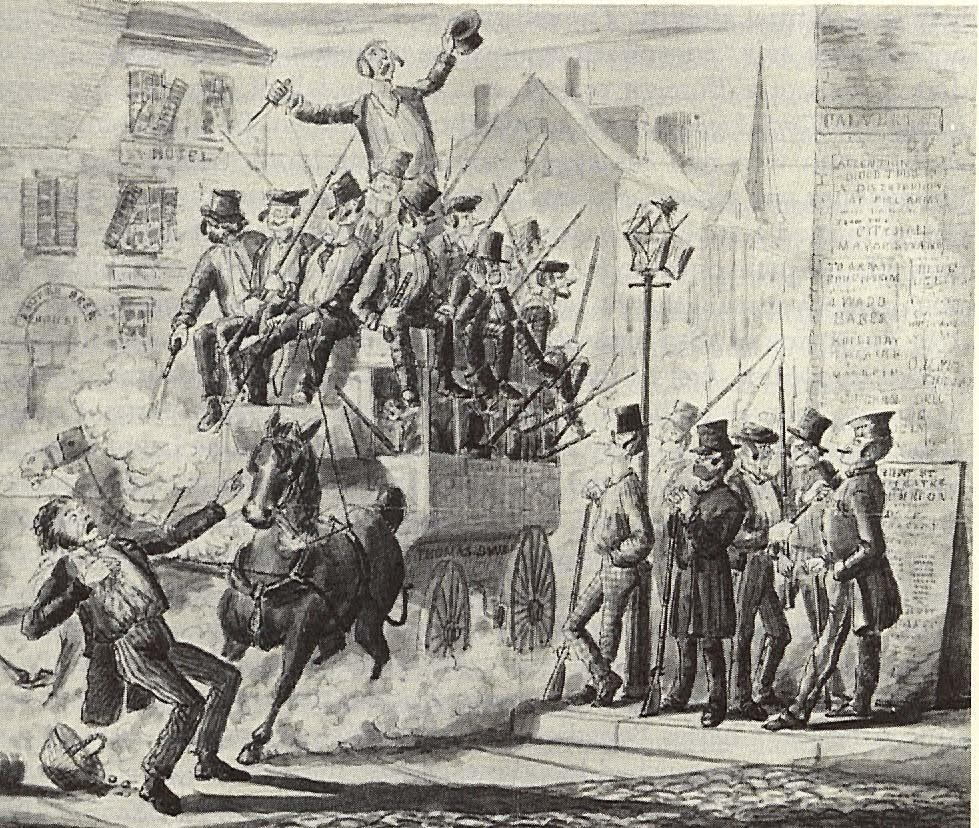
- The Plug Uglies were notorious for being instigators of many Nativist riots in Baltimore from 1854–1865.
- Founding location: Mount Vernon, Baltimore, Maryland
- Years active: 1854–1865
- Territory: Baltimore, Maryland and Five Points, Manhattan, New York City, New York, present-day Worth Street, Baxter Street, and Columbus Park, in Manhattan, New York City, New York
- Ethnicity: Old Stock Americans
- Criminal activities: street fighting, knife fighting assault, murder, robbery, arson, rioting
- Allies: Bloody Tubs, Rip Raps, Nativists, Dead Rabbits
- Rivals: Baltimore Irish American gangs

A plug hat worn by a rowdy Irishman in a 19th-century Thomas Nast stereotyped caricature similar to the ones worn by the Plug Uglies.

The Plug Uglies were an American Nativist criminal street gang, sometimes referred to loosely as a political club, that operated in the west side of Baltimore, Maryland, from 1854 to 1865. The term plug ugly was used to identify an extremely tough ferocious fighter who could give a sound beating to an opponent, with the Plug Uglies' name additionally stemming from their practice of stuffing oversized plug hats with wool and leather, pulling them down over their ears for head protection as primitive helmets during the numerous street battles they participated in. The name Plug Uglies was also used to refer to a number of criminal gangs in New York City as well as Philadelphia.

The Plug Uglies took part in the 1856 Baltimore Know-Nothing Riot. They allied themselves with the New York City Irish Dead Rabbits gang in looting New York City during the American Civil War in the Draft Riots of 1863. However, this latter alleged association is disputed, as the Plug Uglies, a Nativist gang, were anti-Irish.

== History ==
The Plug Uglies coalesced in the 1850s shortly after the creation of the Mount Vernon Hook-and-Ladder Company, a Baltimore Fire Department volunteer fire company located in the Mount Vernon area. They were originally runners and rowdies affiliated with Mount Vernon. Plug Ugly captains included John English and James Morgan. Other prominent members were Louis A. Carl, George Coulson, George "Howard" Davis, Henry Clay Gambrill, Alexander Levy, Erasmus "Ras" Levy, Robert J. "Doc" Slater, James Wardell, and Wesley Woodward. The gang associated with the emerging American Party, also known as the Nativist Know Nothings, in Baltimore.

Like similar associations in Baltimore and other U.S. cities during this period, the Plug Uglies' street influence made them useful to party politicians anxious to control the polls on election days. The Plug Uglies were the central figures in the first election Know-Nothing Riot in Baltimore in October 1855. Together with the Rip Raps, they were also actively involved in deadly rioting at the October 1856 municipal election in Baltimore and in similar violence at the Know-Nothing Riot in Washington, D.C., in June 1857. At the Washington riot, the National Guard was called out to quell the fighting. Accounts of the Washington riot appeared in newspapers nationally and gained widespread notoriety for the Plug Uglies.

Besides election-day fighting, the gang was involved in several assassinations and shootings in Baltimore. Most notably, Plug Ugly Henry Gambrill was implicated in the murder of a Baltimore police officer in September 1858. Gambrill's trial (presided over by judge Henry Stump) and the subsequent deadly violence relating to it, made the crime one of the most sensational of the era.

The violence of the Plug Uglies and other political clubs had an important impact on Baltimore. It was largely responsible for the creation of modern policing and a paid, professional fire department, as well as court and electoral reforms. These reforms, together with the election of a Reform municipal administration in October 1860 and then the Civil War, led to the breaking up of the Plug Uglies.

The Plug Uglies were featured in Herbert Asbury's book Gangs of New York, and Lucy Sante's chronicle of old New York, Low Life. They are also mentioned in Chapter XIII of MacKinlay Kantor's Pulitzer Prize-winning novel "Andersonville" (1955).

On July 16, 1863, during the New York City draft riots, The New York Times reported that Plug-Uglies and Bloody Tubs gang members from Baltimore, as well as the Philadelphia Schuykill Rangers under Jimmy Haggerty and other rowdies of Philadelphia," had come to New York to participate in the riots alongside the Dead Rabbits and other New York gangs. The Times said that "the scoundrels cannot afford to miss this golden opportunity of indulging their brutal natures, and at the same time serving their colleagues the Copperheads and secesh [secessionist] sympathizers."

== Idiom ==
The term "plug ugly" persisted as a minor slang idiom throughout the 20th century and into the 21st, meaning a thug or gangster generally, or sometimes a boxer or ugly person.

== See also ==
- List of historical gang members of New York City

== Notes ==
- Asbury, Herbert (1927). The Gangs of New York: An Informal History of the Underworld. New York: Alfred A. Knoff. ISBN 0-09-943674-4.
