= The Five Points (Metropolitan Museum of Art) =

1827 painting

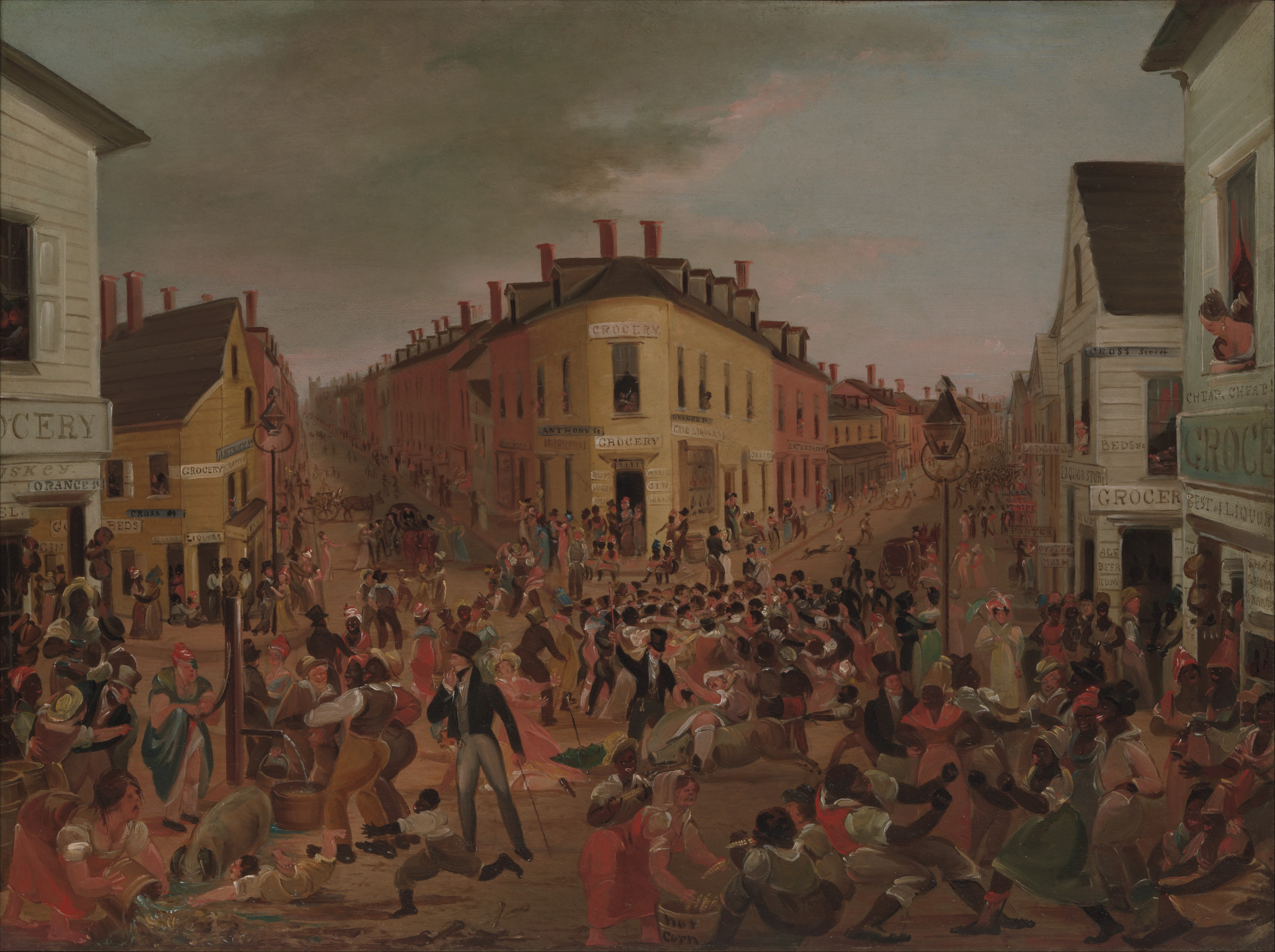
- Artist: Unknown
- Year: c. 1827
- Medium: Oil on wood panel
- Location: Metropolitan Museum of Art; New York City
- Accession: 2016.797.17

The Five Points is an early 19th century oil painting by an unknown artist, in the collection of the Metropolitan Museum of Art in New York City. It is a reproduction of an oil painting by George Catlin depicting the chaotic lifestyle of New York's Five Points district, a notorious slum on the Lower East Side.

Unlike Catlin's painting, the reproduction was itself reproduced many times, notably in an 1855 guide to New York City. One of these reproductions is currently on display at the Metropolitan Museum's Gallery 758.
