= Bloody Tubs =

Gang of opportunistic street thugs

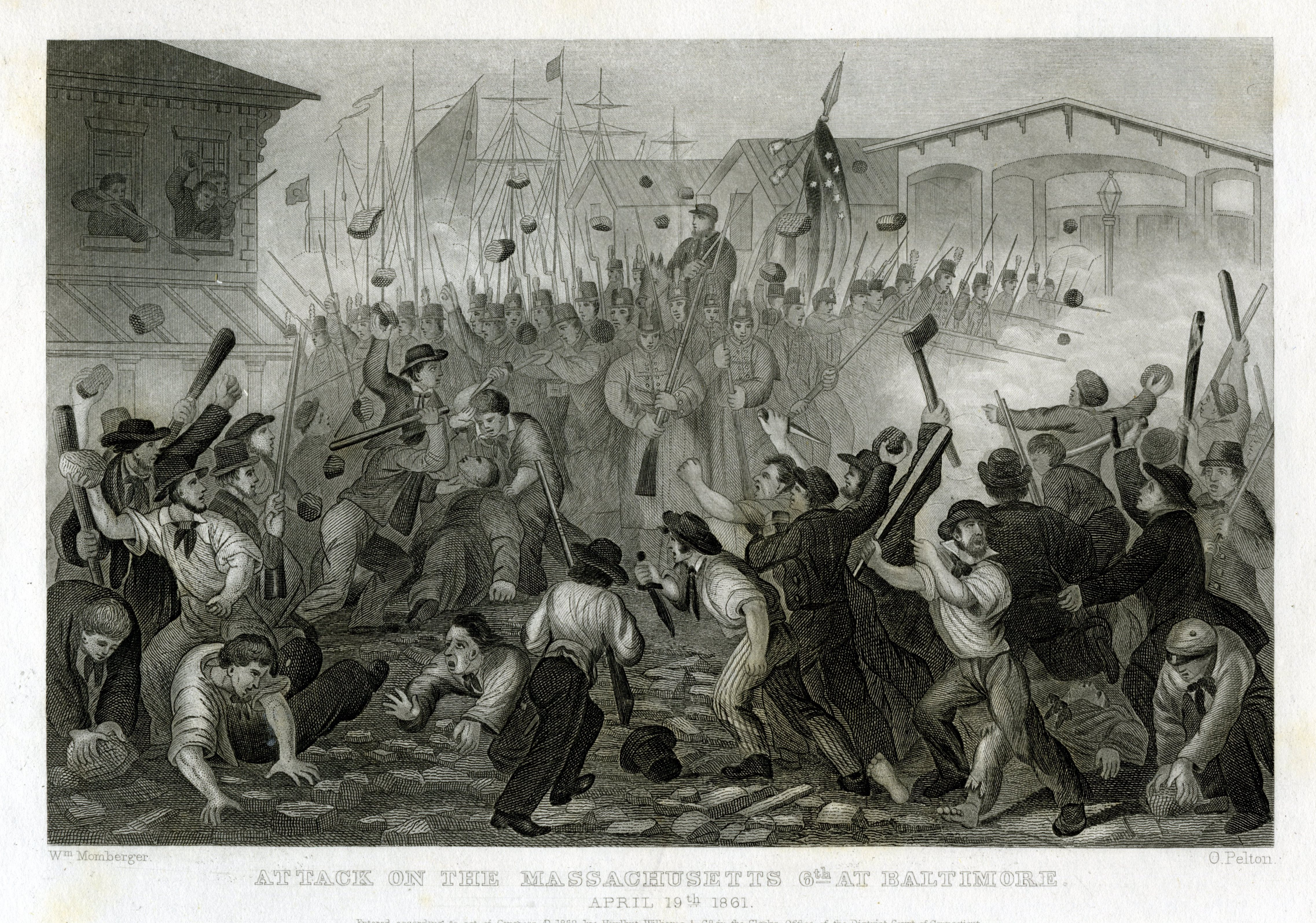
- Founding location: Baltimore, Maryland
- Years active: 1850s-1870
- Territory: Baltimore, Maryland, Philadelphia, Pennsylvania
- Ethnicity: Non-Irish American
- Membership (est.): ?
- Criminal activities: street fighting, knife fighting assault, murder, robbery, arson, rioting, election fraud
- Allies: Plug Uglies, Rip Raps, Nativists, Dead Rabbits
- Rivals: Baltimore Irish gangs

The Bloody Tubs or Blood Tubs were a 19th-century gang of opportunistic street thugs in Baltimore, Maryland, and Philadelphia, Pennsylvania, who worked primarily for Nativist Know Nothing politicians to commit election fraud.

== Formation ==
Formed in the mid-1850s, the gang became known as the Bloody Tubs for their method of dunking political opponents in slaughterhouse tubs. Other sources claim it was derived from the "bloody oaths" members took upon joining the gang. The gang's violent tactics included blocking voting booths and attacking opposing voters, discouraging many people from the polls altogether.

== Attempt to assassinate Abraham Lincoln ==
During the presidential election of 1860, the Blood Tubs reportedly planned to abduct, or possibly assassinate, President-elect Abraham Lincoln when he visited Baltimore. This was connected to the Baltimore Plot.

== Support for the Union ==
At various times they also championed the Union cause. After the infamous Pratt Street Riot, the Blood Tubs could be seen sailing up and down the harbor flying U.S. flags.

== Disestablishment ==
The gang operated for more than a decade before their brutal acts caused so much public outrage that politicians were forced to withdraw their political support, and after 1870 the gang was eventually broken up by police "head smashers" or "strong arm squads," as were many other gangs of the era.
