= The Gangs of New York =

1928 book by Herbert Asbury

The Gangs of New York: An Informal History of the Underworld
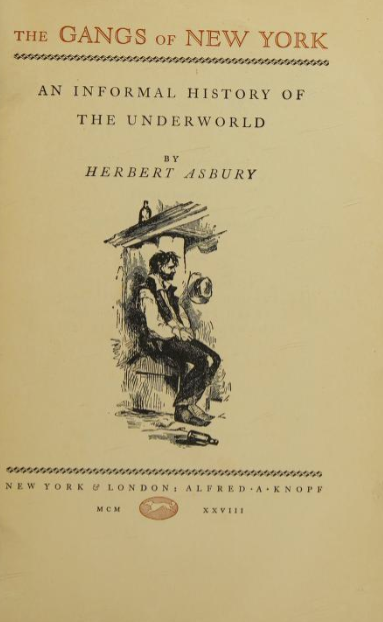
- Title page for The Gangs of New York: An Informal History of the Underworld (1928)
- Author: Herbert Asbury
- Language: English
- Subject: Early 19th-early 20th century crime in New York City
- Published: 1928
- Publisher: Alfred A. Knopf
- Publication place: United States
- Media type: Print
- Pages: 400
- OCLC: 8903814
- Dewey Decimal: 364.106097471
- LC Class: HV6439 .U7

The Gangs of New York: An Informal History of the Underworld is an American non-fiction book by Herbert Asbury, first published in 1928 by Alfred A. Knopf.

In 1927, Asbury published an article in The American Mercury, titled "The Old-Time Gangs of New York", which was ultimately incorporated into the book published the following year. Drawing on the muckraking style of the era, the author wrote based on "legend, memory, police records, the self-aggrandizements of aging crooks, popular journalism, and solid historical research", to present an illuminating account of the gangs of old New York that ultimately gave rise to the modern Mafia.

The book formed the basis for a number of films, including Gangs of New York (1938) and Martin Scorsese's 2002 Academy Award nominated film Gangs of New York, starring Leonardo DiCaprio, Daniel Day-Lewis, and Cameron Diaz.

== Description ==
The book outlines the rise and fall of 19th century gangs in New York City, prior to the domination of the Italian-American Mafia during Prohibition in the 1920s. Focusing on the saloon halls, gambling dens, and winding alleys of the Bowery and the Five Points district of Lower Manhattan, the book evokes the destitution and violence of a turbulent era, when colorfully named criminals like "Dandy" Johnny Dolan, William Poole (also known as "Bill the Butcher"), and Hell-Cat Maggie lurked in the shadows.

Corrupt politicians like William "Boss" Tweed ran the city, and infamous gangs including the Plug Uglies, Dead Rabbits, and Bowery Boys ruled the streets. It includes a rogues' gallery of prostitutes, pimps, poisoners, pickpockets, murderers, and thieves.

The book contains detailed accounts of the New York City Draft Riots of 1863. It elaborates on numerous other criminal influences of the time, including river pirates and the corrupt political establishment, such as Tammany Hall.

== Influence ==
The book has gained a massive cult following, and a wide range of authors continue to mention it in their work. As Russell Shorto writes in his foreword to the 2008 edition by Vintage, "[Asbury's] book became an underground classic because it catalogued the underbelly of New York, which to many is the real New York. His subject is the beast inside every city, and inside every one of us, maybe."

Author Jorge Luis Borges was famously a great fan of The Gangs of New York. His 1935 collection, A Universal History of Infamy (original Spanish title: Historia universal de la infamia) is a direct homage to Asbury's book. Leader of the Jewish-American Eastman Gang, Monk Eastman, and legendary New York-born Wild West outlaw and gunfighter, Billy the Kid, appear in both Asbury's and Borges's books.

Beat Generation author William S. Burroughs named The Gangs of New York as one of his 12 all-time favorite non-fiction titles.

In her 1991 treatise, Low Life: Lures and Snares of Old New York, Lucy Sante discusses many anecdotes about 19th century New York street life made popular through Asbury's book, and she either debunks or confirms them, while simultaneously expanding upon them with her own research findings.

Futurist writer and author of the architecture blog BLDGBLOG Geoff Manaugh references The Gangs of New York in his 2016 book A Burglar's Guide to the City, as he discusses 19th and early 20th century thieves and con men, such as George Leonidas Leslie, whom Asbury mentions multiple times in his book. Manaugh demonstrates how architects can learn valuable things about buildings, and their structural flaws, from professional burglars.

== Similar Works ==
Asbury made multiple attempts to follow up on the success of The Gangs of New York. In 1933, he published The Barbary Coast: An Informal History of the San Francisco Underworld, which explores the seedy underbelly of San Francisco, as it gradually started to form after the 1848 California gold rush. In 1936, he published The French Quarter: An Informal History of the New Orleans Underworld, about New Orleans' most notorious red-light district in the country. In 1940, he published Gem of the Prairie: An Informal History of the Chicago Underworld, which outlines the rise of the Chicago Outfit and other local Mafia groups.

Asbury penned a direct sequel, titled, All Around the Town: Murder, Scandal, Riot and Mayhem in Old New York (1934), and Sucker's Progress: An Informal History of Gambling in America (1938), a complete look at old-time gamesmanship in America.

== Adaptation ==
The book was loosely adapted into the epic historical drama film Gangs of New York (2002) by director Martin Scorsese. A television adaptation is in the works with Scorsese set to return as executive producer and director of the first two episodes, working on a script written by Brett C. Leonard. As Scorsese stated when the show was first announced in 2013, "This time and era of America’s history and heritage is rich with characters and stories that we could not fully explore in a two-hour film. A television series allows us the time and creative freedom to bring this colorful world, and all the implications it had and still does on our society, to life". In 2025, there was renewed interest expressed in a serialization of a new series for the film.

== See also ==
- Books about New York City
- History of New York City
- List of non-fiction works made into feature films
