= Oakhill School =

Oakhill School or Oak Hill School may refer to:

- Oakhill School, Whalley, Lancashire, England
- Oakhill College, Sydney, Australia
- Oakhill School, Weatherfield, a fictitious school in the British soap opera Coronation Street
- Oak Hill School, Oregon, US
- Oak Hill Christian School, Virginia, US
- Oak Hill Industrial Academy, Oklahoma, US, 1878–1936

== See also ==
- Oak Hill High School (disambiguation)
- Oak Hill Elementary (disambiguation)
- Oak Hill Academy (disambiguation)
- Oak Hills Christian College, Minnesota, US
