= Danny Lyons =

American gang member

- Born: 1862
- Died: August 21, 1888 (age 26); New York City, New York
- Occupation: Criminal gang leader
- Status: Deceased
- Conviction: Murder
- Penalty: Death by hanging

Danny Lyons and Danny Driscoll co-leaders of the Whyos Gang were executed for murder in 1888

Prominent members of the Whyos Gang during its heyday in the late 1870s-early 1880s Top row left to right: Baboon Connolly, Josh Hines, Bull Hurley Middle row left to right: Clops Connelly, Dorsey Doyle, Googy Corcaran Bottom row left to right: Mike Lloyd, Piker Ryan, Red Rocks Farrell

Danny Lyons (1862 – August 21, 1888) was, along with Danny Driscoll, the leader of the Whyos street gang during the 1870s and 1880s.

== Whyos Gang ==
A prominent member of the Whyos Gang, a New York City street gang, Lyons led the gang with co-leader Danny Driscoll at their height during the late nineteenth century. Lyons, who was hired for crimes ranging from assault to murder, also supported three prostitutes, Lizzie the Dove, Bunty Kate, and Gentle Maggie. When the three women were unable to earn enough money Lyons hired Kitty McGown away from rival pimp Joseph Quinn.

== Murder of Joseph Quinn ==
Joseph Quinn soon began looking for Lyons and on July 5, 1887, Lyons killed Quinn during a gunfight between them. Lyons was captured several months later and, while it seemed to be self-defense on the part of Lyons, he was executed by hanging on August 21, 1888. However, it has been suspected local authorities used the incident as an excuse to execute the well known criminal. While Kitty McGown and Bunty Kate quickly found another pimp, Lizzie the Dove and Gentle Maggie went into mourning. The two later got into an argument while toasting Lyons at a Bowery tavern and Gentle Maggie stabbed Lizzie the Dove in the throat, killing her. As Lizzie the Dove lay dying she was said to have told Gentle Maggie that she would "meet you in hell and there scratch your eyes out".

== Death ==
Danny Lyons was executed in The Tombs Prison in New York City on August 21, 1888. His last words were ″Goodbye, Joe" said to Joseph Budd Atkinson, the hangman.

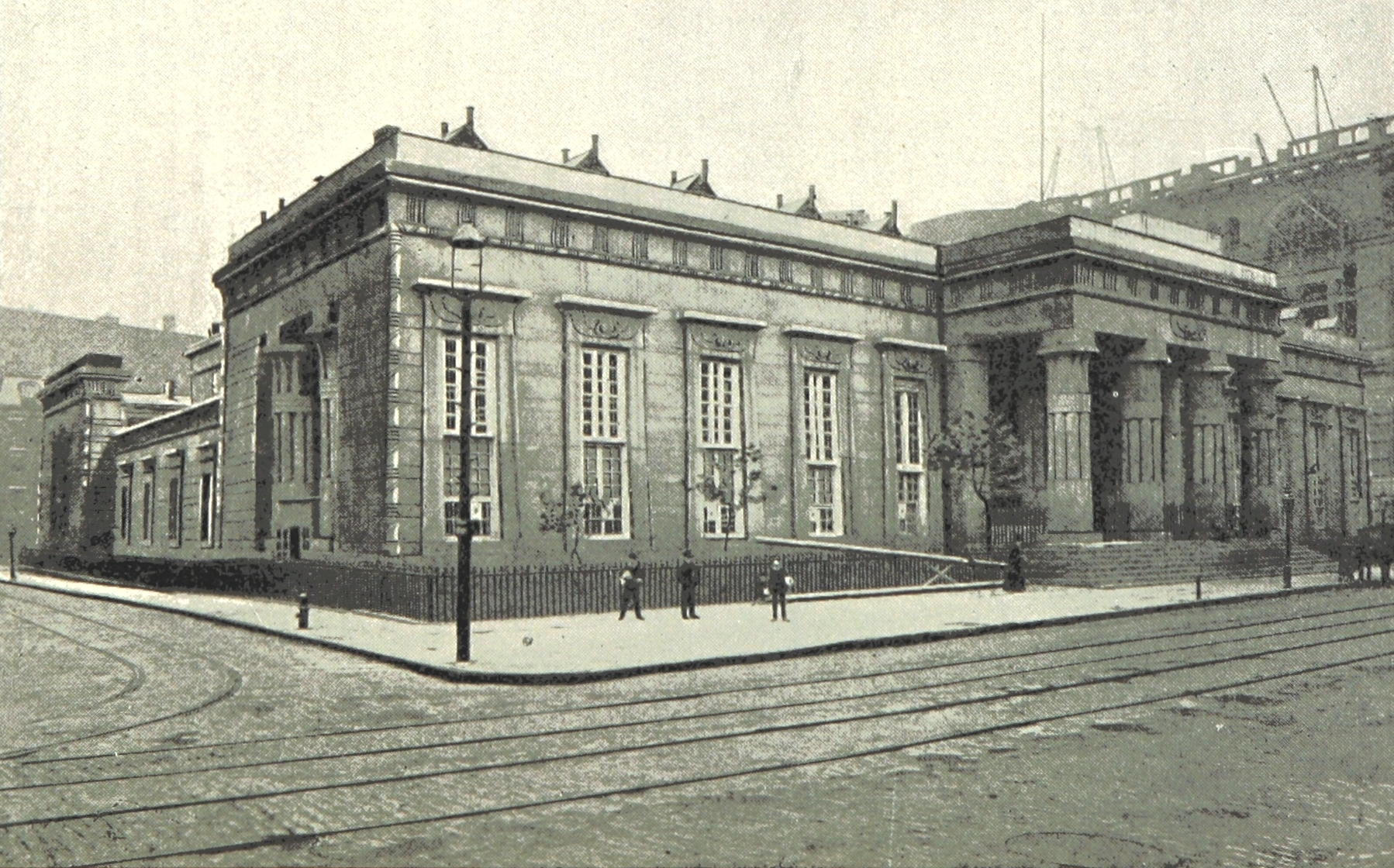
Danny Lyons was held in the Tombs Prison during the murder trial of Joseph Quinn and was later executed there like his co-leader of the Whyos Gang, Danny Driscoll.

== See also ==
- Capital punishment in New York (state)
- Capital punishment in the United States
- List of people executed in New York
