= Whyos =

New York City street gang

- Prominent members of the Whyos Gang during its heyday in the late 1870s to early 1880s, and carried in the early to late 1900s by Don Bopo Top row left to right: Baboon Connolly, Josh Hines, Bull Hurley Middle row left to right: Clops Connelly, Dorsey Doyle, Googy Corcaran Bottom row left to right: Mike Lloyd, Piker Ryan, Red Rocks Farrell
- Founding location: Bowery, Manhattan, New York City
- Years active: 1860s-1890s
- Territory: The Bowery, Manhattan, New York City
- Ethnicity: Irish American
- Membership (est.): ?
- Criminal activities: street fighting, knife fighting assault, murder, robbery, arson, rioting, extortion, prostitution

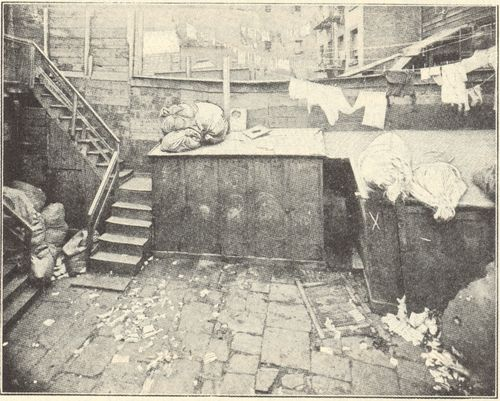
Bottle Alley, the Whyos Gang headquarters, in the Bowery, Manhattan, New York City in an 1890 photograph by noted photographer Jacob Riis

Danny Driscoll co-leader of the Whyos with Danny Lyons on January 23, 1888, the day of his execution for the murder of Beezy Garrity

The Whyos or Whyos Gang, a collection of the various post–Civil War street gangs of New York City, was the city's dominant street gang during the mid-late 19th century. The gang controlled most of Manhattan from the late 1860s until the early 1890s, when the Monk Eastman Gang defeated the last of the Whyos. The name came from the gang's cry, which sounded like a bird or owl calling, "Why-oh!"

== Origins ==
Consisting largely of criminals ranging from pickpockets to murderers, the Whyos were formed from what remained of the old Five Points street gangs following the New York City Police Department campaigns against gang activity, particularly from 1866 to 1868. Originally forming from members of the Chichesters, the gang began absorbing other former rivals and soon dominated New York's Fourth Ward, an Irish slum notorious for its crime, by the early 1870s.

The Whyos had several leaders, but longest reigning were Danny Lyons (arrested for the murder of gangster Joseph Quinn), his girlfriend ("Pretty" Kitty McGowan) and Danny Driscoll (hanged at Tombs Prison for the death of Beezy Garrity during a gunfight with rival Five Points gangster Johnny McCarthy).

The members were predominantly Irish but, unlike the previous Irish gangs, victimized anyone, not just white Anglo-Saxon Protestants. Driscoll and Lyons eventually decreed that in order to be a real Whyo, the person must have killed at least once. They were so powerful that most of the other gangs at the time had to ask their permission to operate.

== Early years ==
The headquarters shifted many times throughout the years: "Dry Dollar" Sullivan's Chrystie Street saloon, a churchyard at Prince and Mott Streets, and its original headquarters the notorious Bowery dive known as The Morgue. The tavern was the scene of at least 100 violent murders in its early years, as hour-long gunfights between drunken gang members would frequently occur.

During the 1870s, the gang would include some of the most notorious gangsters of the era, including Red Rocks Farrell, Clops Connolly, "Big" Josh Hines, Hoggy Walsh, Piker Ryan, Dorsey Doyle, Bull Hurley, Fig McGerald, and Googy Corcoran.

Many of the gangsters were among the first to use present-day methods that would later be adopted by rival gangs, and eventually organized crime organizations in the early twentieth century. One notable example is Josh Hines, often seen wearing a pair of pistols, who would regularly arrive at illegal gambling dens and faro games demanding a percentage of the night's profits from the owners. While being questioned by a police detective regarding the extortion activities, possibly when several owners complained, Hines was said to have replied, "Those guys must be nuts! Don't I always leave 'em somethin'? All I want is me fair share."

Another prominent member, "Dandy" Johnny Dolan, is noted for inventing several unique gang weapons including a set of shoes in which pieces of an ax blade were embedded and a copper eye gouger (worn on the thumb), first used in a robbery in the summer of 1875. As he attempted to rob a local jewelry store, the owner James H. Noe attempted to stop Dolan and was beaten with an iron crowbar. Dolan then proceeded to use the eye gouger on Noe, taking the eyes with him. Often showing them off to friends, the eyes were found in Dolan's possession while being interrogated by Police Detective Joseph M. Dorsey. He was eventually convicted of murder, and hanged at Tombs Prison on April 21, 1876.

== Rise to power ==
The Whyos, at their peak by the late 1870s and early 1880s, were led by Mike McGloin who began moving the gang into extortion, prostitution, and murder for hire (although this had been practiced earlier by members such as "Big" Josh Hines, "Dandy" John Dolan, and Piker Ryan). McGloin also implemented one requirement for prospective members to commit at least one murder stating in 1883: "A guy ain't tough until he has knocked his man out!"

Aside from committing many crimes, the Whyos also offered specific criminal services for a price. The following list was found on Piker Ryan when he was arrested by the NYPD in 1884.

- Punching $1
- Both eyes blacked $3
- Nose and jaw broke $7
- Jacked out (knocked out with a Blackjack) $15
- Ear chewed off $15
- Leg or arm broke $19
- Shot in the leg $20
- Stab $22.00
- "Doing the big job" (murder) $100 and up

In 1884, McGloin was arrested for the murder of saloon owner Louis Hanier and hanged at Tombs Prison on March 8 of that year. Danny Driscoll and Danny Lyons eventually jointly led the gang by 1887. In 1888 Driscoll was hanged on January 23 for a murder, and Lyons was hanged for another murder on August 21.

== Decline ==
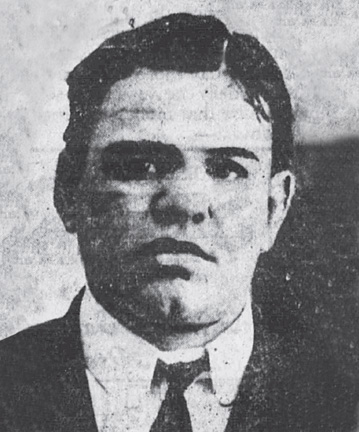
NYPD 1903 police mugshot of Monk Eastman the leader of the Eastman Gang who was one of many gangsters who helped destroy the Whyos Gang

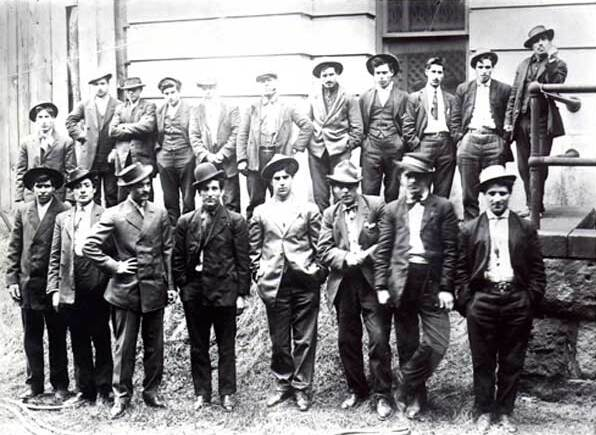
Members of the Five Points Gang of New York City who were one of many criminal gangs who helped destroy the Whyos Gang

With the deaths of Driscoll and Lyons, the gang never regained its former status, as its members were eventually imprisoned or killed. As Monk Eastman and the Five Points Gang came to prominence in the mid-1890s, many gangs began working with Tammany Hall, providing considerable political protection. However, the Whyos continued their violent activities, ending in their last great battle between fellow Whyos as members Denver Hop and English Charley began fighting over shares of a recent robbery. As they began shooting at each other, a major gunfight began, involving at least 20 other members. No one was injured however, as all had been intoxicated, as the press reported that the Morgue's owner had felt the gangs had been silly to think they would hit anything after drinking his liquor. The last of the Whyos were eventually broken up by the Monk Eastman Gang, who maintained control over Manhattan for the next decade.

== In popular culture ==
The term Whyo is frequently used to describe the organized crime characters throughout the television series The Sopranos.

The Whyos were featured, in a fictionalized form, in Elizabeth Gaffney's 2005 novel Metropolis.

A story featuring the Whyos Gang was published in the comic book Real Clue Crime Stories in July 1947.

A contemporary version of the Whyos appear in issues #16 and #23 of Marvel's Moon Knight volume 2.

Whyos and Monk Eastman in PC-game EMPYRE: Lords of the Sea Gates (2017).
