= Youth detention center =

Type of prison or a secure residential facility for people under the age of majority

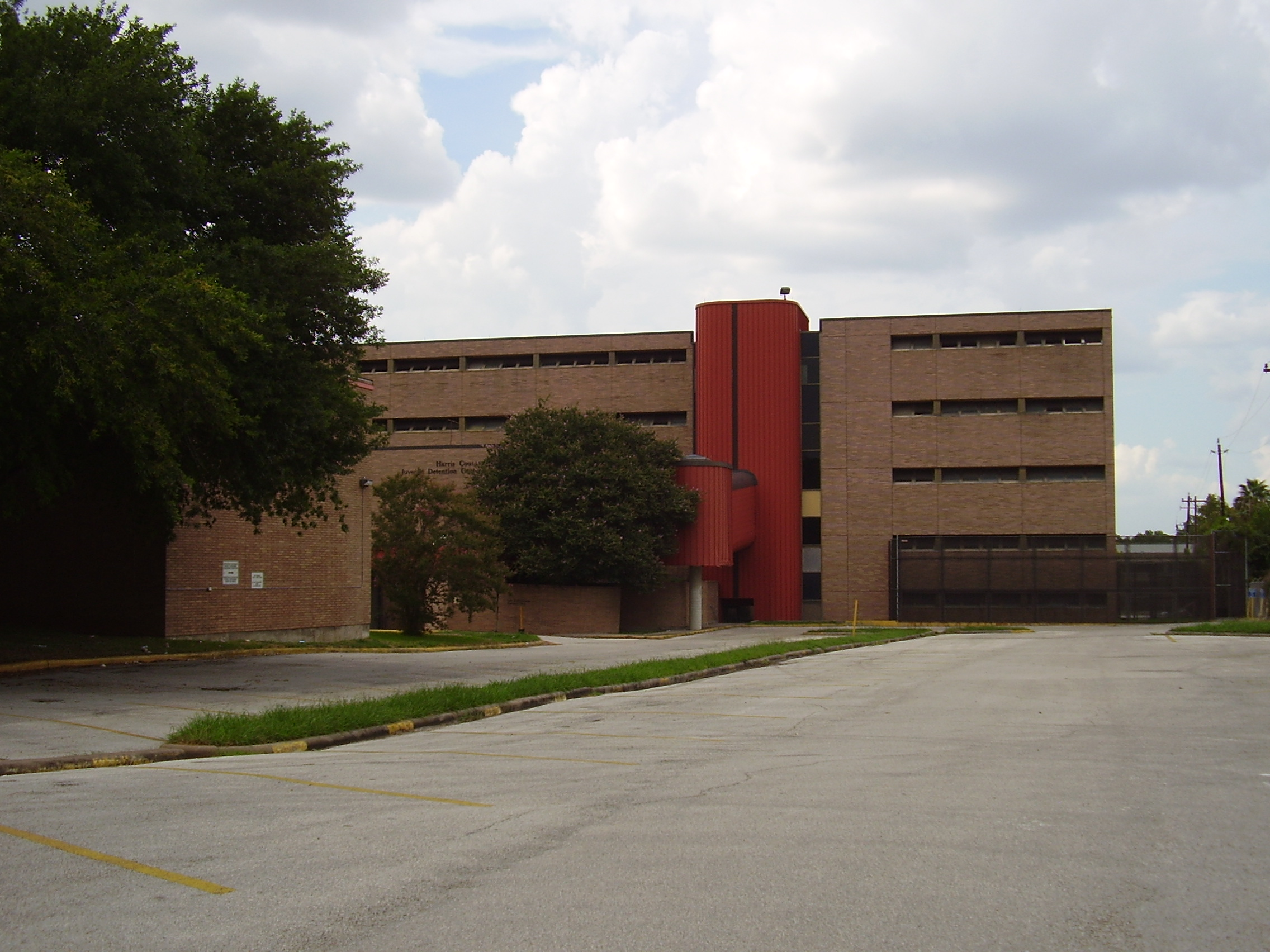
Harris County Juvenile Detention Center, Houston, Texas

In the US criminal justice system, a youth detention center (YDC) may also be referred to as a juvenile detention center (JDC), juvenile detention, juvenile jail, juvenile hall, observation home and a remand home. Colloquially it is often referred to as "juvie". A YDC or JDC is a prison or a secure residential facility for youth offenders under the age of 18, also legally referred to as minors or under the age of majority. Juvenile offenders are tried in juvenile court, which is a separate system for youth offenders. After arrest as well as depending upon many factors, such as the frequency and nature of their crimes, juveniles either await trial or placement in a long-term care program, with the goal of rehabilitation.

Some juveniles are released directly back into the community and must undergo community-based rehabilitative programs. Those offenders who are determined by the court to pose a greater threat to society and to themselves are sentenced to a full-time, supervised juvenile detention center. If a juvenile is sent to a juvenile detention center, there are two types of facilities: secure detention and secure confinement.

Secure detention means that juveniles are held for usually short periods of time in facilities in order to await current trial hearings and further placement decisions. By holding juveniles in secure detention, it ensures their appearance in court and also keeps the community safe. This type of facility is usually called "juvenile hall" ("juvie"), which is a holding center for juvenile delinquents. On the other hand, secure confinement implies that the juvenile has been committed by the court into the custody of a secure juvenile correctional facility for the duration of a specific program, which can span from a few months to many years.

Officially, juvenile detention is not intended to be punitive. The goal of secure custody is to provide the offenders with care consistent with the doctrine of parens patriae, or "the state as parent". The state or local jurisdiction is usually responsible for providing education, recreation, health care, assessment, counseling and other intervention services with the intent of maintaining a youth's well-being during their stay in custody.

Generally speaking, secure detention is reserved for juveniles considered to be a threat to public safety or the court process, though in many cases, youths are held for violating a court order. Status offenders, i.e., juveniles charged with running away from home, alcohol possession, and other offenses that are not crimes if committed by adults, may only be held for 24 hours or less, while initial case investigation is completed, and other alternatives are arranged.

There does not currently exist a uniform, cohesive definition for juvenile residential treatment programs. Within the categories of secure detention and secure confinement for juveniles, the overarching name of these facilities is "residential programs". Five overarching types of residential programs where a juvenile may be placed while in court custody are: The Office of Juvenile Justice and Delinquency Prevention found the five types of residential programs for juveniles to be a broad range, which included detention, corrections, camp, community based, and residential treatment. The wide variety in juvenile placement options is due to the lack of a uniform definition of these residential treatment programs. Without a federal, uniform definition, this creates a lack of uniformity across all 50 states and the diverse and often confusing names for centers for "secure detention" and "secure confinement" for juvenile offenders.

== Services provided to the youth ==
Many services are supposed to be provided to the youth at both detention centers and confinement facilities. Services vary from facility to facility, but in general the programs and services provided to the youth are geared toward the juvenile's needs. At the core, juvenile facilities function as rehabilitative institutions for youth. Education is seen by many as the primary rehabilitative service that must be provided to detained youth. Highly effective schools within juvenile facilities provide high school curriculum, opportunities for General Equivalency Diploma (GED) preparation, special education services, certified teachers, small student to teacher ratio, connection with families, and vocational training opportunities. Despite state and federal requirements, there are many problems with the educational systems in juvenile detention centers. Many institutions do not provide basic education services, and in others, children only receive a fraction of the state-mandated instructional time, and classes are not based on a coherent curriculum. (Katherine Twomey, The right to Education in Juvenile Detention Under State Constitutions, p. 766). Some facilities do not have designated classrooms, libraries, or even books, and the teachers are often poorly trained, and are not trained in how to deal with special needs of children in detention. (Id. at 767.) Despite these shortcomings, there have been very few consequences to states for violating the requirements of the No Child Left Behind Act, (Id. at 779.); therefore, states do not have much incentive to improve standards to achieve compliance.

=== Mental health ===
There is a long-standing connection found in research between youth who commit crimes and mental health concerns. A remarkably high population of juveniles present serious mental health illness within juvenile facilities. Since juvenile detention facilities operate on the foundation of rehabilitating the youth, different mental health programs are provided by facilities to help the youth rehabilitate. It is the expectation that juvenile detention centers and juvenile institutions provide mental health services to their residents. The incarcerated youth population requires careful and structured intervention, which must be provided by the facilities.

Many different mental health treatment strategies exist for juveniles. It is the responsibility of case management to decide what type of intervention strategy works best for each youth in their mental health treatment plan. Mental health services that can be provided to the youth include, individual counseling, group counseling, crisis counseling, family intervention, medication management, and transition planning.

=== Education ===
Education is seen by many as the cornerstone of youth rehabilitation. Many landmark court cases, such as the 1981 case of Green v. Johnson, have given way to juveniles receiving their educational rights while incarcerated. Green v. Johnson (1981) ruled that incarcerated students do not have to give up their rights to an education while incarcerated.

Despite research stating the need for strong educational programs in juvenile detention facilities, there does not exist a uniform standard for education in juvenile facilities as education settings in juvenile facilities greatly vary across the country. The overseer of the school within the juvenile facility differs from state to state. Some schools within juvenile detention facilities are decentralized, some are centralized and run by school districts, and others are overseen by a State education agency. A Swedish ethnographic study of education in juvenile detention illuminates the struggles faced by staff and young people regarding schoolwork, including overcoming staff skepticism and dealing with pupils’ school sabotage.

==== Special education ====
There is a large percentage of incarcerated juveniles who are diagnosed as students with special needs. Under the Individuals with Disabilities Education Act (IDEA), youths with disabilities in correctional facilities are entitled to special education and related services regardless of incarceration status. The Office of Special Education Programs (OSEP) requires State Education Agencies to ensure that special education services are being provided at juvenile facilities.

Being that there is a wide variety a short term or long term stay.

There is a grave presence of juveniles who are classified as youth with disabilities. The disabilities most prevalent in incarcerated juveniles include intellectual disabilities, learning disabilities, and emotional disturbances. Surveys and studies have found that a high number of incarcerated youth suffer from emotional disturbance disabilities as opposed to youth in general public schools. Even with key court decisions and acts, it has been found that a large number of juveniles held at both detention centers and confinement facilities are not being served the special education services they should be provided by law. It has been found that many juvenile detention institutions have struggling special education programs, especially for those centers that detain youth for short periods of time.

==== Zero tolerance policies in juvenile court schools ====
Juvenile court schools provide public education for juveniles who are incarcerated in facilities run by county probation departments. These schools are located in juvenile halls, juvenile homes, day centers, ranches, camps, and regional youth education facilities and are operated by the county board of education. Even though court schools have the same school curriculum, they are often more strict in discipline that is more punitive than holistic. The most disadvantaged and "troubled" students are filling up schools in the juvenile justice system. These students are often further behind in credits and with more personal and structural problems than their counterparts at traditional schools. The majority of these teenagers struggle with learning disabilities, which ties with noticeable behavioral problems, and are experiencing emotional and psychological problems at home. Zero tolerance policies seem to be more strict in the juvenile justice system than in other traditional schools. In a juvenile court school, when a student violates a zero tolerance rule they automatically are prone to suspension and eventually going back to a detention center for its violation. In contrast, a student from a traditional school is more likely to get a second chance for its violation. Zero Tolerance policies are enforced in a greater manner in juvenile court schools than in other traditional schools.

The rules at juvenile court schools are strict and are based on zero tolerance policies. Zero Tolerance Policies may serve more to "push students further out of school and into the school-to-prison pipeline than to re engage them". Students are being harshly punished for minor incidents that should be fixed without having to involve severe consequences. Zero tolerance policies have taken over the role of education. The definition of Zero Tolerance Policies is described in the article, A Study of Zero Tolerance Policies in Schools: A Multi-Integrated Systems Approach to Improve Outcomes for Adolescents, as "…a widespread application to minor offenses can be attributed to the "Broken Windows" theory of crime. This theory analogizes the spread of crime to a few broken windows in a building that go un-repaired and consequently attract vagrants who break more windows and soon become squatters".

Stephen Hoffman in his article, "Zero Benefit: Estimating the Effect of Zero Tolerance Discipline Policies on Racial Disparities in School Discipline" states that, "...zero tolerance discipline policies are associated with poorer school climate, lower student achievement, higher dropout rates…" At juvenile court schools, students are expected to follow a set of rules. The rules at the Court Schools differ from those at traditional schools; they are more punitive.

== Concerns and criticism ==
Two major concerns in regard to juvenile detention centers and long-term confinement facilities have been raised: overcrowding and ineffectiveness. As the number of juvenile cases has increased in the past 15 years, so has the number of juveniles spending time in secure and confined facilities. As a result, the system has become overcrowded, often leading to a shortage of available beds.

Overcrowding exists in many facilities for juveniles, and in overcrowded juvenile detention centers and correctional facilities increased violence can occur. Furthermore, overcrowding can lead to a shortage of necessary and promised programs and services in the facility. Underfunding an overcrowded facility can lead to a shortage of services for the youth, such as education and mental health services.

Apart from overcrowding, the overall efficacy of juvenile secure facilities in the life of youth has been questioned. The high juvenile recidivism rate has caused many critics to question the overall efficacy of secure detention centers and confinement facilities.

== Systems ==
=== United States ===
There were 45,567 total juveniles in detention facilities in 2016. 32,301 juveniles were in a public facility. 13,266 were in a private facility. A Department of Justice survey found that about 12% of youth in juvenile facilities reported at least one incident of sexual abuse by staff or other inmates in a 12-month period, with some facilities reporting rates substantially higher than the national average.

==== Connecticut ====
In 1870, Long Lane School was built on donated land in Middletown. However, it became the Connecticut Juvenile Training School (CJTS) in 2003. CJTS was a treatment facility dedicated to delinquent boys from age 12–17. There had been numerous controversies and scandals associated with CJTS between 1998 and 2005. In 2005, Governor Jodi Rell attempted to close the facility, but it was instead reformed in 2008 by The Department of Children & Families. The new CJTS featured a therapeutic model which was developed with assistance from The Boys & Girls Clubs of America. The school was shut down without replacement in 2018.

==== District of Columbia ====
The Department of Youth Rehabilitation Services (DYRS) is the District of Columbia's head juvenile justice agency and is responsible for placing DC community youth who are in its oversight in detention, commitment, and aftercare programs.

DYRS offers and operates a range of services and placements for their committed youth. The secure centers that DYRS operates are Youth Services Center (YSC) and New Beginnings Youth Development Center. YSC is the District's secure detention center. New Beginnings Youth Development Center is a secure confinement facility for the District's committed youth.

YSC is operated by DYRS as the District of Columbia's secure juvenile detention center, which was opened in 2004. It is an 88-bed facility for male and female detained (not committed) youth who have been accused of delinquent acts and are awaiting their court hearings. YSC's meets the required needs of the youth it serves. Education services in YSC are provided by the District of Columbia Public Schools (DCPS), which delivers a range of services to the residents. The facility also provides programs and services to meet the essential mental health, emotional, physical, and social needs of the youth. YSC provides a secure and humane environment and coordinates all court meetings and team meetings for its youth. Above all else, YSC makes certain that the protection of the legal rights of the juveniles are being upheld.

New Beginnings Youth Development Center is another secure DYRS operation. The center is a 60-bed, all-male secure center for DC's most serious youth delinquents. The $46 million facility opened in 2009 in unincorporated Anne Arundel County, Maryland, near Laurel. New Beginnings replaced the Oak Hill Youth Center, which was located .5 miles (0.80 km) away in unincorporated Anne Arundel County.

The main goal of New Beginnings is to provide residents with 24-hour supervision as well as programs and services that allow for successful transitions back into the DC community. The services provided include educational, recreation, medical, dental, and mental health programs. DYRS created a partnership with the See Forever Foundation to provide the educational services of Maya Angelou Academy for the residents. Behavioral health staff oversee the mental health programs. The facility is a 9–12-month program, which is modeled after the very successful Missouri Model.

Maya Angelou Academy was founded in 2008, first at Oak Hill Youth Center, and now is the education program serving DYRS committed youth at New Beginnings Youth Development Center. Maya Angelou Academy is part of the Maya Angelou Charter School Network in the DC area. The academy provides a safe, structured, and intensive learning environment to the youth it serves at New Beginnings Youth Development Center.

==== Pennsylvania ====
PA Child Care is a detention center in Pennsylvania, US. It was part of the kids for cash scandal in which judges were given kickbacks in exchange for imposing harsh sentences on youth offenders so that the detention centers would get business.

== Canada ==
Youth detention in Canada is governed by the federal Youth Criminal Justice Act. Facilities are administered by provincial and territorial governments. Historically many of these centers were known as "training schools" which operated under the Juvenile Delinquents Act (1908–1984). Many former residents have come forward with allegations of physical, sexual, and psychological trauma, leading to multi-million dollar settlements. Modern centers are designed to look less like traditional prisons, featuring educational spaces, mental health services, and reintegration programs.

=== Ontario ===
Youth detention centers in Ontario fall under the Ministry of Children, Community and Social Services, operating within the rules of the federal Youth Criminal Justice Act. These secure custody facilities house youth aged 12–17 who are in pre-trial detention or serving sentences for offenses. In response to declining custody populations the Government of Ontario announced the closure of 26 youth custody March 1, 2021.

== See also ==
- Boot camp
- Borstal
- Juvenile delinquency
- List of youth detention center incidents in Ontario
- Reform School
- Solitary confinement#Juveniles
- Young offender
- Youth services

Nation specific:

- Australia
  - Punishment in Australia
  - Northern Territory
    - Juvenile detention in the Northern Territory
- United States
  - Juvenile delinquency in the United States
  - Youth incarceration in the United States
- Youth Offending Team
- Philippines
  - Children in jail in the Philippines
- Indonesian children in Australian prisons
- New Zealand
  - Youth justice in New Zealand
