= OHHS =

OHHS may refer to:

- Oak Harbor High School (Ohio), Oak Harbor, Ohio, United States
- Oak Harbor High School (Washington), Oak Harbor, Washington, United States
- Oak Hill High School (disambiguation)
- Oak Hills High School, Bridgetown, Ohio, United States
- Olympic Heights Community High School, Boca Raton, Florida, United States
- Oxon Hill High School, Oxon Hill, Maryland, United States
