= Ernestine Schaffner =

American prison reformer

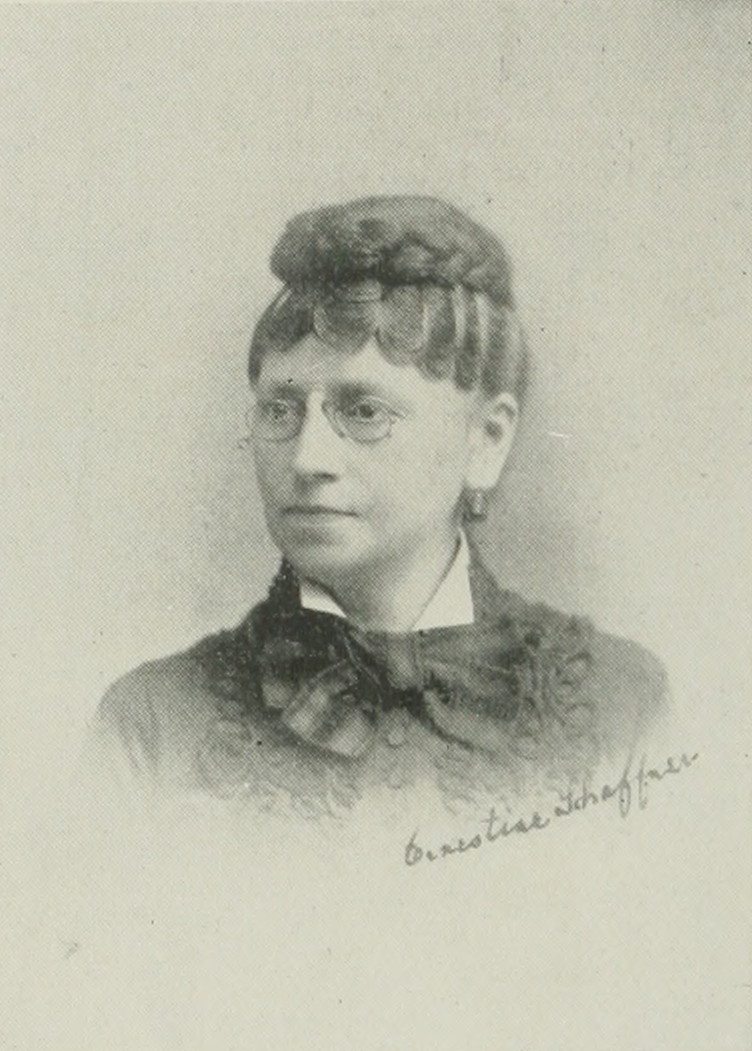
Ernestine Schaffner, a "Woman of the Century"

Ernestine Schaffner (known as "The Prisoner's Friend"; ca. 1828 – June 18, 1902) was a German-born American prison reformer. She was the first to do volunteer missionary work among those detained in the New York City Prison, known as The Tombs, having the financial means to indulge her charitable leanings in a substantial way. Daily, she left her luxurious home in New York City to try and right some of the wrongs inflicted by society and the law. In 1890, Schaffner's philanthropic work had grown to be so extensive that she engaged a salaried lawyer to attend to the legal part of it, and at the same time, she opened an office near The Tombs at 23 Centre Street. Here she advertised: ‘Free Advice to the Poor and the Innocent Accused.’ Schaffner was regularly out US$20,000 in bail bonds, and she had a considerable sum lent to those who had been prisoners. She and Rebecca Salome Foster were known as "The Angels of the Tombs".

== Career ==
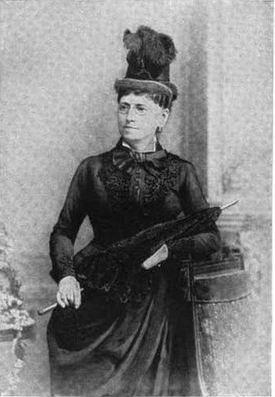
Ernestine Schaffner

Ernestine Schaffner was born ca. 1828, in the Electorate of Hesse, and became a resident of New York City. She always felt a deep interest in the criminal and downtrodden people of her city, and after 1885 she worked on behalf of prisoners of both sexes, who were under arrest or serving sentences in the city prisons. Her office was located at No. 21 Centre Street, near one of the prisons. Over the door, the sign said: "Free Advice to the Poor and to the Innocent Accused." She visited the courts and devoted her time to the relief of the prisoners. Her work was carried out alone. Schaffner spoke English with a strong Teutonic accent, and dressed very plainly in black. Her mornings were entirely devoted to her charitable work. She defrayed all her charitable expenses from her private accounts, even permanently retaining a lawyer to act for her clients. She was very sensitive, and the mere memory of some of the scenes of misery that she had witnessed during her investigations in the poorest districts of the metropolis brought tears to her eyes when she related her experiences.

Schaffner's motivation to begin the work followed an arrest ca. 1884 of a youth who had formerly worked in her house. He had attempted suicide, and when Schaffner heard of his trouble, she visited him in prison. There, she saw something of the misery existing among persons awaiting trial, many of whom were too poor to employ legal help. The boy's family was poor; they had neither cash nor political "influence." US$300 in cash or secured by city real estate was the bail required for the boy's release. Schaffner had money and property in her own right. After she talked with the boy, she went to the District Attorney's office, deposited the sum required, and returned to The Tombs with an order for the prisoner's release. The charge against him was subsequently dismissed, and he went on to work in a mercantile house.

She began to think of how many innocent people may be unjustly accused of crime, and how she could help them, should she make it her life-work. From that time, she devoted herself to the cause of the innocent accused. She gave out over US$50,000 in bail money and lost about US$600, with US$250 of that she lost through a lawyer, who was afterwards in The Tombs under a sentence for swindling. The circumstances surrounding that situation were that after Recorder Smyth would not allow Schaffner to provide bail for an accused person, refusing either to accept her bond or cash, she gave the money into the hands of the lawyer, who was engaged to defend the accused, and lost it.

Skilled at reading facial expressions, she was seldom deceived in those whose cause she undertook to champion. She never failed to get an acquittal on the merits of a case. She read every letter, investigated thoroughly, and then acted. She voluntarily gave up a life of ease to devote herself to the cause of those who may have been wrongfully held. She rescued scores of innocent persons from unjust detention, trial, and conviction on circumstantial evidence.

The news of her benevolence spread. Discharged convicts frequently sought her out and begged for her help. She gave one such man a US$10 bill with which to purchase some peddlers' wares. A friend who witnessed the interaction and the gift laughed at her. "That fellow will never buy anything he wants, except liquor. The man is a criminal of the most irredeemable stamp." Eighteen months later a well-dressed, frank-looking man entered Schaffner's office. She did not know him, and said so. "Why, you lent me ten dollars some time ago, Mrs. Schaffner," he said. "I am doing well now. I've given up crooked work and have an honest bank account of my own. Here is that ten dollars. It made a decent man of me, and you may be able to hand it over to another poor fellow."

Schaffner's work was criticised by many with whom she came in contact. One of the judges in New York refused to accept her bond, believing that she was often victimized by undeserving persons. Others acknowledged her worthiness, but denounced her as a nuisance. Her importunity on behalf of her clients was often disagreeable to prosecuting officers. Nevertheless, it was a fact that she accomplished a vast amount of good. The work begun by her grew until she was unable to take up half the cases presented to her.

== Personal life ==
Her husband, Philip J. Schaffner, who preceded her in death, was a well-to-do merchant. She had two sons —Ernest M. and Robert F.— and two daughters —Emma R. and Martha S.— but none of her family was connected with the prison work. Schaffner died June 18, 1902, in New York City.
