= Rebecca Salome Foster =

American prison relief worker (1848–1902)

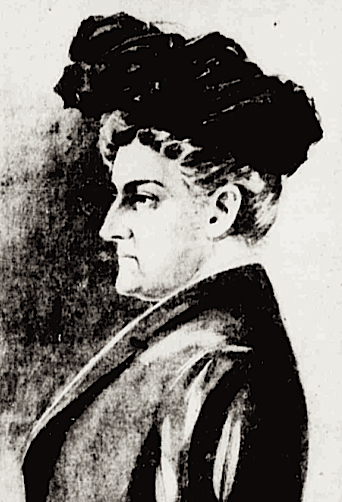
- Born: October 24, 1848; Alabama
- Died: February 22, 1902 (aged 53); New York City (Park Avenue Hotel fire)
- Occupation: Christian missionary
- Known for: prison relief worker "The Tombs Angel"

Rebecca Salome Elliott Foster (October 24, 1848 - February 22, 1902) was an American woman from Alabama known as a City Missionary and prison relief worker in New York City. She became known as the "Tombs Angel" because of her ministry to suspects held before trial at The New York Halls of Justice and House of Detention (otherwise known as "The Tombs"). She expanded her work to include guidance, small financial support, job-seeking assistance, and other aid to newly released prisoners in an attempt to help them transition to the outside world. Foster's work predated most modern-day probation systems, including both the New York State Probation Commission (est. 1907) and the New York City Department of Probation.

== Biography ==
She was born as Rebecca Salome Elliott on October 24, 1848, in Alabama, the daughter of planter John Howard Elliott and his wife Margaret Adele (née Blue). Her parents likely moved to New York before or during the war, perhaps having been one of those planter families who had close ties with people in the city through business.

During the last year of the Civil War, at the age of 19 Rebecca Elliot married Union colonel and attorney John Armstrong Foster (March 5, 1833 – February 11, 1890) on February 28, 1865, at Calvary Church in New York. It was designed in 1848 by James Renwick Jr. at 4th Avenue and 21st Street. She continued to attend this church in the future. One of her daughters later said she remembered family stories that a member of President Abraham Lincoln's cabinet attended her parents' wedding. John Foster was mustered out of the Army in August 1865 and was brevetted as a brigadier general in September 1865.

The Fosters had four children together, only two of whom survived to adulthood: Salome (Lomie) Elliott (1865-1867); Marie Louise (1867-), married Francis S. Colt; Jeanette Jennie (1873-1958), married William C. Bowers; and John (Johnnie) Armstrong (1873-1879).

Her husband John Armstrong Foster was from Schoharie County, New York. He had moved with his parents to New York City when young. At the age of 28, he had enlisted as a private in the Civil War in April 1861 in Co. “F” 7th NY Infantry SM, but was mustered out in June. The following year, in November 1862, he was commissioned into Field & Staff 175th NY Infantry, where he was promoted to Lieutenant Colonel.

The newly married couple lived in New York City. In later life, John Foster suffered from alcoholism, lost his friends, and abandoned his family in 1888. Foster initially supported herself and her daughters from her pay working for the Presbyterian City Mission Society of New York. After John Foster abandoned the family, she wore the black mourning clothes of a widow when in public. Her husband died February 11, 1890, and she became a widow in fact. He was buried at the gravesite of his parents in Woodlawn Cemetery, The Bronx.

From the mid-1880s on, Rebecca Foster worked assisting people who were charged and defendants in the New York legal system, especially before they went to trial. She was involved with women defendants. She became known as a "Tombs Angel" because she ministered to suspects and criminals incarcerated at The New York Halls of Justice and House of Detention ("The Tombs"). She was one of two women who became notable in this role, the other being Ernestine Schaffner, who also worked on behalf of prisoners from about 1870 until her death in 1903.

Foster eventually worked on her own as a volunteer with prisoners in the "Tombs". Besides ministering to the needs of the incarcerated pending trial, she had gained considerable respect from government officials. She acted as an unofficial court investigator and advisor, trying to ascertain the facts of each inmate's case and giving her judgment as to whether the person was innocent or guilty of charges. She also worked to support former prisoners in their lives after they were released, taking a role as a kind of ad hoc "probation officer" well before that formal system was established in New York in 1901.

In later life Rebecca Salome Foster lived as a resident at the Park Avenue Hotel. At the age of 54, she was one of at least 14 people who died in the fire there on February 22, 1902.

Her funeral at Calvary Church was attended by a large crowd that spanned many classes. She was buried in the same plot as her husband and his parents at Woodlawn Cemetery in The Bronx, New York. One tombstone monument is inscribed with all four of their names and dates.

== Legacy and honors ==
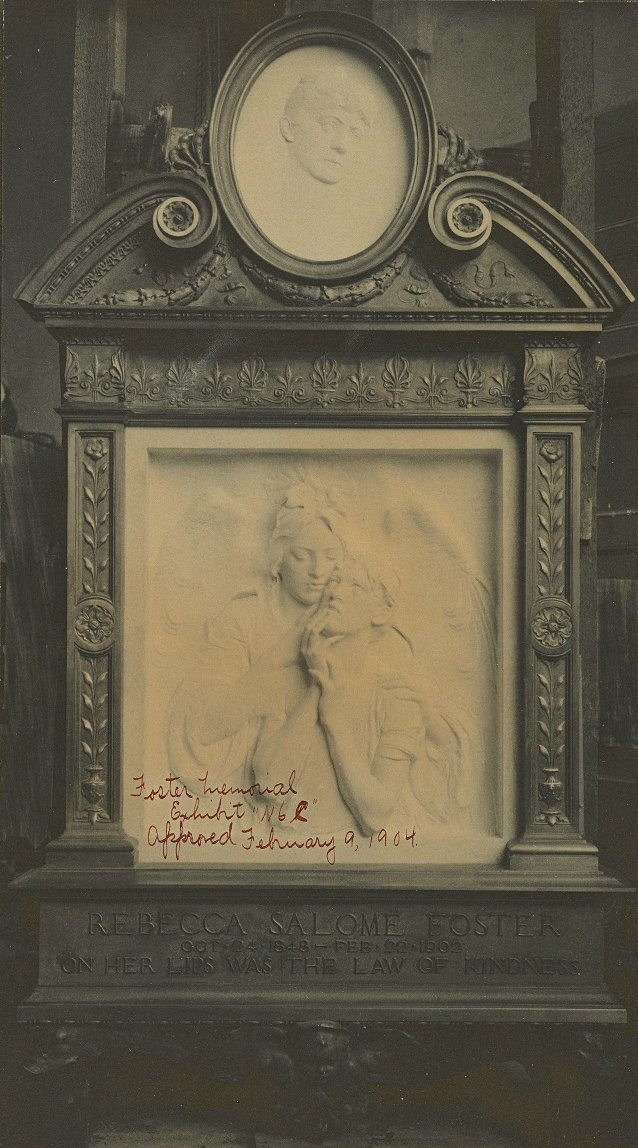
The monument to Foster

Foster's role as the somewhat anonymous "Tombs Angel" was publicized by newspapers after her death. Her funeral on February 25, 1902, at the Calvary Church in Manhattan, was attended by many people whom she had saved from conviction, notable reform figures, and officials and court judges.

After her death, leaders of the City Club initiated a campaign to commission a monument to honor her. Leading judges and President Theodore Roosevelt joined the fundraising effort. The sculptor Karl Bitter was commissioned to create a marble monument to Foster. It is a bas-relief, featuring her and a prisoner. It also had a medallion portrait of her, and a bronze frame by Charles Rollinson Lamb. The work was installed in 1904 at the old Criminal Courts building. It was removed to storage in 1940 when the building was being demolished for replacement.

The monument was rediscovered in the 21st century, and restored, although the medallion and bronze frame had been lost ( or stolen) through the decades. It was rededicated on June 25, 2019, when it was installed in the lobby of the New York Supreme Court located at 60 Centre Street in Manhattan. Its restoration and dedication are part of an effort the city is making to recognize women whose contributions have not been formally memorialized.
