= William J. Sharkey (murderer) =

American murderer

William Sharkey
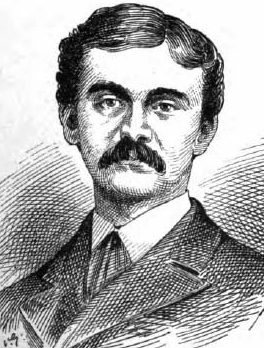
- A sketch of Sharkey (1873).
- Born: William J. Sharkey c. 1847; New York, New York
- Disappeared: November 22, 1873 (aged 26)
- Status: Missing for 152 years, 10 months and 14 days; presumed dead in absentia (Note: Sharkey was never found after his escape, but today he would be at an age where it is almost guaranteed he would be dead.)
- Occupation: Politician
- Political party: Democratic
- Spouse: Maggie Jourdan
- Conviction: First degree murder
- Penalty: Death
- Escaped: November 22, 1873

Details
- Victims: Robert S. Dunn
- Imprisoned at: The Tombs

William J. Sharkey (c. 1847 – after 1873) was a New York City politician and convicted murderer who earned national notoriety in the late 19th century for escaping from a New York prison disguised as a woman. He subsequently fled to Cuba, which was part of the Spanish Empire at the time and not subject to extradition treaties. Sharkey was never captured, and his ultimate fate is unknown.

== Early life ==
Sharkey was born in New York City around 1847 and came from a respected and well-to-do family. A physical description of him in his late twenties stated that he was about five feet seven inches (5'7") tall, had high cheekbones, dark hair, and a "thin face somewhat feminine in appearance ... the eyes sharp and clear". Contemporaneous sources described him as handsome, well-dressed, interesting, and confident. Sharkey decided at an early age to adopt the "flash life" of a burglar, pickpocket, gambler, and "sporting man". Sharkey's gang, the Sharkey Guard, was described as "a gang of young gentlemen of questionable habits".

== Political career ==
Sharkey's early adulthood coincided with the rise to power of William Tweed, whose Tammany Hall political machine had seized control of the city and engaged in systemic political corruption. Sharkey and his gang soon came to the attention of Tweed and his associates, who saw an opportunity to feed Sharkey's ambition while serving their own goals. With their assistance, Sharkey became a "politician of no mean influence". "He was a power in the Eighth Ward primaries, had a club named after him, and belonged to every influential political organization in the fifth congressional district."

Sharkey's political career appeared to wane, however, when he was "defeated by internal dissensions in the Tammany Party". "He was nursed and petted until all his lambs had been brought into the fold, and then Tammany betrayed him." Sharkey returned to his old ways: "After this, he gave up hopes of office, and devoted himself to the pursuit of his ordinary avocations, gambling, and stealing."

== Murder of Robert S. Dunn ==
In 1872, Sharkey traveled to Buffalo, New York and invested in a faro bank, a popular card game in 19th-century America but also a game widely known for rampant cheating by both players and dealers. He lost $4,000 in five days. He then returned to New York City and recruited an associate named Robert S. Dunn, a professional gambler who also held a position as a public servant in the office of the Comptroller. Sharkey provided him with $600 to win back the money that he had lost. Dunn apparently lost as well and returned to New York City empty-handed.

The next time that Sharkey and Dunn were in the same company was at the funeral of James Reilly, a politician known to both men. They marched in the funeral procession together, and subsequently convened with other friends at a local bar. According to one source, Sharkey accused Dunn of reneging on his obligation to repay him, even though Dunn had recently won $1,500. He shot and killed Dunn, then fled. Sharkey remained at large for only a short time, having made it known to the police that he wanted to surrender. He was arrested by Captain Ira S. Garland and placed in a Manhattan jail to await trial.

=== Trial ===
Sharkey's trial was a sensation at the time. Each day, large crowds convened to catch a glimpse of the accused. The trial was covered extensively by The New York Times.

Sharkey was charged with first degree murder, a crime punishable by death under state law. His defense attorneys argued that Sharkey indisputably killed Dunn but there was no way to know if it was premeditated. The jury could thus only find him guilty of manslaughter. During the trial, one witness declined to answer (on fear of self-incrimination) whether he had been bribed with $500 to give testimony favorable to the defense. On June 21, 1873, the jury found Sharkey guilty of premeditated murder, with a recommendation to mercy. The defense requested a retrial on procedural grounds, and the court convened again on June 23 and 29, 1873, to consider the motion, which was ultimately denied.

On July 3, 1873, Sharkey was formally sentenced to be hanged on August 15, 1873. One of his attorneys then filed a formal appeal which was granted on August 7, 1873. Sharkey seemed unmoved by the proceedings; according to accounts, he "did not betray the slightest emotion," and appeared "in the best of spirits".

=== Confinement ===
Sharkey had been confined in a prison adjacent to the courthouse called The Tombs throughout the trial and sentencing. By most accounts, he was a troublesome inmate. One author noted, "He became so violent in his demonstrations that Warden Johnson ordered that he be locked up and put in close confinement," and that Sharkey was "continually insolent and abusive to his keeper". The Times reported that Sharkey attempted to stab one of the prison keepers. He was placed in solitary confinement and kept under close surveillance, and the door of his cell remained closed except to receive meals. Yet, some accounts implied a life of relative luxury and privilege; Walling noted, "The cell was richly fitted up, and the occupant evidently was not leading a very restricted life." On August 6, 1873, the day before Sharkey's appeal was granted, he was reportedly found under the influence of "intoxicating liquors, though from what source these have been obtained the Warden has been unable to find out".

== Escape ==
On November 22, 1873, Sharkey's lover Maggie Jourdan visited him in The Tombs with Sarah Allen, whose husband was also confined there. Both women were given passes to enter and exit the prison, but neither was searched by the guards. The women visited Sharkey for an indeterminate period of time, then Jourdan presented her exit pass to the guards at the prison gate and left. A second woman presented a pass at the gate an hour or so later and exited the prison, dressed in a black coat and hat. Her face was concealed by a veil, but she was later described as "large and rather masculine in appearance". About an hour later, Allen tried to exit the prison but was stopped when she failed to produce a pass.

The keeper of The Tombs realized immediately that something was amiss. Allen was held for questioning, and a search of each cell was ordered. The guards reached Sharkey's cell and "discovered that its occupant was not there. The door was unlocked, and Sharkey's clothing lay on the floor. On a little shelf, some locks of hair were found, which were supposed to be the remains of the murderer's mustache."

The last sighting of Sharkey was from a guard who noticed a "peculiar-looking woman" jumping aboard a fast-moving street car. The guard later remarked that he was "somewhat surprised to see the nimble way in which she alighted on a car, which was going at the time at considerable speed". The escape was considered "the most daring and unparalleled break-jail in the history of this country".

Speculation immediately arose about accomplices. The Times speculated that Sharkey had "the assistance and cooperation of persons equally as skilled as himself". That source cited a "rumor" that two guards had been placed under arrest. According to one account, Jourdan "had taken an impression in wax of the lock on her lover's cell, and assisted by Sharkey's confederates outside the prison, had managed to have a key made". She was arrested immediately after the escape, but subsequently released due to lack of evidence. The superintendent of police thought that "the plan of escape has been arranged for some time, and was not a thing of a moment's decision, as the prison authorities would pretend." Sharkey was never found despite the offer of a $2,000 reward for his capture and an extensive search.

== Life as a fugitive ==
The details are speculative regarding Sharkey's subsequent life as a fugitive. He remained in New York City for several weeks after his escape, then booked passage to Cuba between late 1873 and early 1874 under the name "Frank Campbell" aboard the schooner Frank Atwood. Cuba was part of the Spanish Empire at the time and had no extradition treaty with the United States. Coincidentally, Tweed also fled to Cuba aboard the Frank Atwood in 1873 after escaping from jail, where he was imprisoned for corruption charges.

Sharkey lived for a while in Cuba, allegedly visiting the American consulate in Havana to read about himself in the New York papers. His source of income remains unknown, although "he seemed to have plenty of money, and in answer to some inquiries made, he stated that his brothers furnished him with all he wanted from New York." Jourdan joined Sharkey in Cuba around 1876, and they subsequently married. She later returned to the U.S., an apparent victim of abuse.

In March 1875, it was reported that Sharkey was arrested while trying to sail to South America, and that his return to New York was imminent. An article appeared indicating that Sharkey had entered the military service in South America. The Auckland Star reported in June 1900 that Sharkey was "located in Southern Spain, where he is eking out an existence as a guide, and the police have information which should result in his capture". American journalist Herbert Asbury wrote, "They never found Sharkey" in 1931, when Sharkey would have been around 84 if he was still alive.

Although Sharkey officially remained a fugitive, he was born in 1847 (179 years ago), so it is certain that he is dead, and that his death and burial were recorded under an alias.

== See also ==
- List of fugitives from justice who disappeared
