= Lynelle Maginley-Liddie =

American attorney

38th Commissioner of the New York City Department of Correction
- Incumbent
- Assumed office December 8, 2023
- Mayor: Eric Adams
- Preceded by: Louis Molina
- Succeeded by: Stanley Richards

First Deputy Commissioner of the New York City Department of Correction
- In office March 5, 2021 – December 8, 2023
- Commissioner: Cynthia Brann; Vincent Schiraldi; Louis Molina
- Preceded by: Stanley Richards
- Succeeded by: Francis Torres

Personal details
- Born: Antigua
- Education: John Jay College of Criminal Justice (BA); Fordham University (JD)

Lynelle Maginley-Liddie is an American attorney, notable for being appointed the 38th commissioner of the New York City Department of Correction on December 8, 2023. She was previously an agency attorney and first deputy commissioner for the department. As first deputy commissioner, she led the department's efforts to provide access to COVID-19 vaccinations during the pandemic.

== Biography ==
Maginley-Liddie was born in Antigua. She studied at the John Jay College of Criminal Justice to obtain a bachelor's degree in government, followed by a Juris Doctor from Fordham University School of Law. Maginley-Liddie began her career as an associate at the law firm of Leader Berkon Colao & Silverstein LLP, and began work in New York City government in 2015, in the General Litigation Unit.
