= Kaz Daughtry =

American politician

- Official portrait, 2026

Deputy Mayor of New York City for Public Safety
- In office March 7, 2025 – December 31, 2025
- Mayor: Eric Adams
- Assistant Deputy Mayor: Mona Suazo (2025)
- Preceded by: Chauncey Parker

Deputy Commissioner of Operations for the New York Police Department
- In office February 6, 2024 – March 7, 2025
- Commissioner: Edward Caban

Regional Director for Region 2 for the Cybersecurity and Infrastructure Security Agency
- Incumbent
- Assumed office July 2026

Personal details
- Born: 1980 (age 45–46) New York City, New York, United States
- Spouse: Danielle
- Children: 2
- Education: Excelsior University Frederick Community College

Kaz Daughtry (born 1980) is an American police officer and administrator who served as the Deputy Mayor of New York City for Public Safety under mayor Eric Adams.

== Early life ==
Kaz Daughtry is a native of the New York City borough of Queens and was raised in LeFrak City.

== Career ==
Daughtry began his career with the NYPD as a cadet in 2005. After graduating the police academy, he became a police officer on January 9, 2006, and has held various positions, including assignments in the 73rd and 75th Precincts, the Community Affairs Bureau, and the Patrol Services Bureau. Daughtry was a leader of a special NYPD unit called the Community Response Team, an initiative of mayor Eric Adams that has been criticized for its aggressive approach to policing. Daughtry has received complaints of misconduct reported to the Civilian Complaint Review Board.

On March 7, 2025, Daughtry was appointed by Adams as the Deputy Mayor of New York City for Public Safety. The announcement came after four deputy mayors resigned following allegations of Adams collaborating with President Donald Trump.

On February 12, 2026 Daughtry announced that he will be New York State & Local Law Enforcement liaison to the United States Department of Homeland Security.

In July 2026, Daughtry was appointed as a Cybersecurity and Infrastructure Security Agency Regional Director for CISA's Region 2 which covers New York, New Jersey along with Puerto Rico and the U.S. Virgin Islands.
