= Chauncey Parker =

American public servant

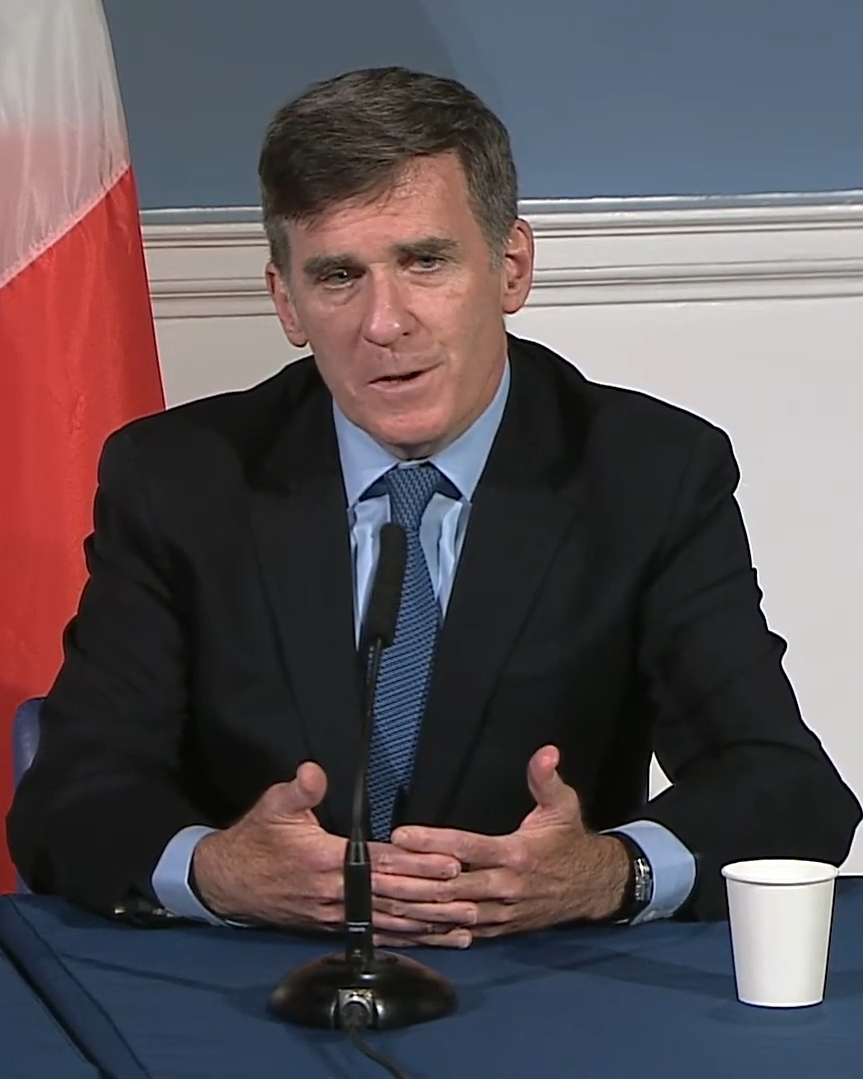

Deputy Mayor of New York City for Public Safety
- In office October 15, 2024 – February 17, 2025
- Mayor: Eric Adams
- Assistant Deputy Mayor: Mona Suazo (2024-2025)
- Preceded by: Philip Banks III
- Succeeded by: Kaz Daughtry

Assistant Deputy Mayor of New York City for Public Safety
- In office July 17, 2024 – October 15, 2024
- Mayor: Eric Adams
- Deputy Mayor: Philip Banks III
- Preceded by: Louis Molina
- Succeeded by: Mona Suazo

Deputy Commissioner for Community Partnerships of the New York Police Department
- In office December 10, 2019 – July 17, 2024
- Commissioner: Dermot Shea
- Succeeded by: Vacant

Personal details
- Born: Chauncey Parker; August 16, 1960 (age 65)

Chauncey Parker (born August 16, 1960) is an American government official who served as the Deputy Mayor of New York City for Public Safety under Mayor Eric Adams until 2025. He formerly served as the Assistant Deputy Mayor of New York City for Public Safety and Deputy Commissioner for Collaborative Policing for the New York City Police Department. He is also (and has been since 1995) the Executive Director of the New York/New Jersey HIDTA, a federal grant program that invests in law enforcement partnerships to build safe and healthy communities.

Parker is a career public servant. He is a graduate of Rollins College and Duke University School of Law. After graduating from law school in 1986, he began his career in the Manhattan District Attorney's Office, where he served for five years under Manhattan District Attorney Robert M. Morgenthau. He next served for 10 years as an Assistant U.S. Attorney for the Southern District of New York under United States Attorney Mary Jo White.

In 2002, New York Governor George E. Pataki appointed Parker as the Director of Criminal Justice and Commissioner of the Division of Criminal Justice, where for five years he oversaw all state criminal justice agencies. In 2010, Parker returned to the Manhattan DA's Office as an Executive Assistant District Attorney under Manhattan District Attorney Cyrus Vance Jr. On December 9, 2019, NYPD Police Commissioner Dermot Shea appointed Parker to the position of Deputy Commissioner for Collaborative Policing.

During his career, Parker has helped create and build several key law enforcement partnerships, including:

- Gun Violence Strategies Partnership (GVSP), a multi-law enforcement agency partnership that meets every weekday morning to review – with a laser-focus – the recent violent felony arrest (within past 24 hours) of repeat offenders who are driving gun violence in New York City. The GVSP began in August 2021. Visitors have included numerous government officials, as well as numerous elected officials, law enforcement leaders, government and community partners.
- RxStat, a multi-agency public health/public safety partnership that works together, particularly through Overdose Fatality Reviews (OFRs), to develop strategies to reduce drug overdoses in New York City.
- Overdose Response Strategy, a national public health/public safety partnership, led by the HIDTA program, the Centers for Disease Control and Prevention (CDC) and the CDC Foundation, where two-person teams – a Drug Intelligence Officer and a Public Health Analyst – work together in every state nationwide to develop strategies to reduce drug overdoses and save lives.
- Operation IMPACT (renamed the Gun Involved[sic] Violence Elimination Initiative), multi-agency law enforcement partnerships in the largest counties outside of New York City, funded by the New York State Division of Criminal Justice Services, develop joint strategies to reduce gun violence in their communities.
- Harlem Children's Zone Armory Sports Center, a former homeless shelter that was transformed – with law enforcement funding—into a sports center for children in the community.
- Saturday Night Lights, a law enforcement and community partnership that provides free sports programs – with top coaches and police officers – for teenagers in over 130 gyms across New York City, every Saturday night, year round.

Parker is the recipient of the United States Department of Justice Award for Distinguished Service; the J. Edward Lumbard Award from the United States Attorney's Office for the Southern District of New York; and the Rx and Illicit Drug Summit's Congressman Hal Rogers Beacon of Hope Award. Parker also serves on the Board of Directors of the Joyful Heart Foundation, a nonprofit founded by actress and advocate Mariska Hargitay and dedicated to creating "a world free of sexual assault, domestic violence and child abuse."

Preceded by Katherine Lapp	New York State Director of Criminal Justice Services; 2002–2007	Succeeded by Denise O'Donnell
