= Louis Molina =

American police officer

Louis A. Molina
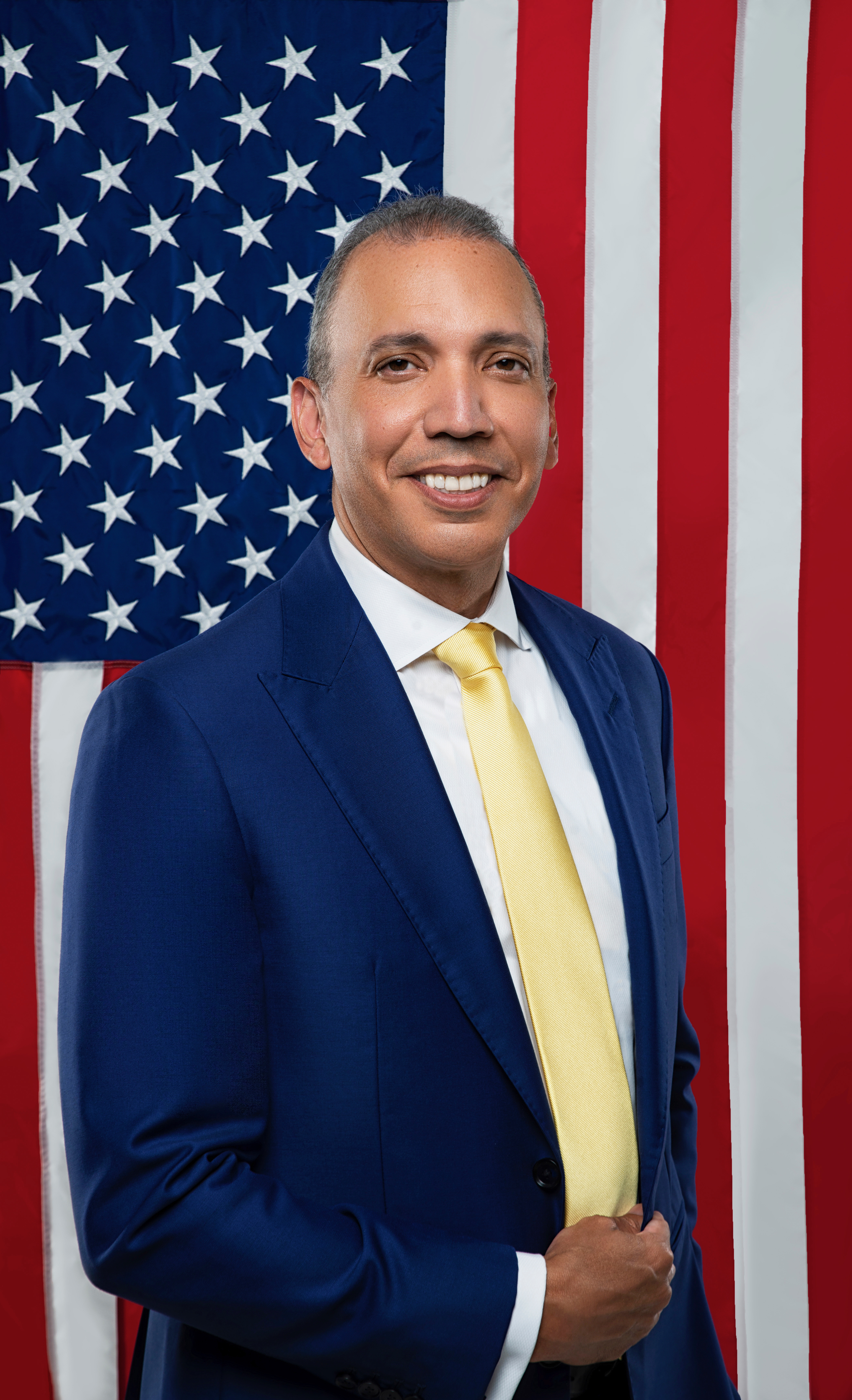

7th Commissioner of the New York City Department of Citywide Administrative Services
- In office July 1, 2024 – December 31, 2025
- Mayor: Eric Adams
- First Deputy: J. Carolina Chavez (2025-present)
- Preceded by: Dawn M. Pinnock
- Succeeded by: Yume Kitasei

Assistant Deputy Mayor of New York City for Public Safety
- In office December 9, 2023 – June 30, 2024
- Mayor: Eric Adams
- Deputy Mayor: Philip Banks III
- Preceded by: position established
- Succeeded by: Chauncey Parker

37th Commissioner of the New York City Department of Correction
- In office January 1, 2022 – December 8, 2023
- Mayor: Eric Adams
- Preceded by: Vincent Schiraldi
- Succeeded by: Lynelle Maginley-Liddie

5th Chief of the Las Vegas Department of Public Safety
- In office January 11, 2021 – December 23, 2021
- Mayor: Carolyn Goodman
- City Manager: Jorge Cervantes
- Preceded by: Michele Freeman
- Succeeded by: Jason Potts

First Deputy Commissioner of the Westchester County Department of Correction
- In office March 2018 – December 12, 2020
- County Executive: George Latimer
- Preceded by: position established
- Succeeded by: Nory Padilla

Personal details
- Born: Louis Anthony Molina; April 24, 1972 (age 54) New York, New York, U.S.
- Spouse: Shannon Molina (2001-present)
- Education: Chaminade University (BA); Columbia University (MA); Marist College (MPA)

Military service
- Allegiance: United States
- Branch/service: United States Marine Corps
- Years of service: 1991 - 1995
- Rank: Corporal
- Unit: 2nd Battalion - 3rd Marines

Louis A. Molina (born April 24, 1972) was an American police officer and former Commissioner of the New York City Department of Citywide Administrative Services. Commissioner Molina formerly served as Assistant Deputy Mayor for Public Safety for the City of New York, and the 37th Commissioner of the New York City Department of Correction. He was formerly the Chief of the Department of Public Safety for the City of Las Vegas and detective with the New York Police Department.

== Early life and education ==
Molina was born in New York City in 1972 and grew up in Bronx, New York. He attended Cathedral Preparatory Seminary, later graduating from Christopher Columbus High School, graduating in 1991. From there, he served in the United States Marine Corps (1991–1995). He attended Chaminade University of Honolulu, graduating in 1997 with a bachelor's degree in philosophy. In 2011, Molina graduated from Marist College School of Management with a master's in public administration and while studying at Marist was awarded a partial scholarship to study at Columbia University Graduate School of Arts and Sciences graduating in 2012 with a master's of arts in human rights studies, and in 2020 received a partial scholarship from Harvard Business School Fund for Leadership & Innovation and completed the Harvard Business School General Management Program.

== Career ==
Molina began his career as a patrol officer in Manhattan's Upper East Side neighborhood with the New York City Police Department's 19th Precinct in 2000 after graduation from their training academy. He rose to the rank of detective in the New York Police Department and also served as president of the National Latino Officers Association.

=== Kings County District Attorney's Office ===
The late Brooklyn District Attorney Ken Thompson initially appointed Molina in 2014 as Director of Training for the Office's Detective Investigations Bureau and within a few months was promoted to Deputy Chief Investigator.

=== New York City Department of Homeless Services ===
In August 2015, Molina was hired by former Commissioner of the New York City Department of Homeless Services as a Senior Advisor for security and emergency operations to address public safety issues in and around the vicinity of homeless shelters. New York City Mayor Bill de Blasio and Steven Banks the Commissioner for the Department of Social Services made the decision to hand over shelter security to the New York City Police Department, despite objections made by Molina. Molina left the Department of Homeless Services.

=== New York City Department of Correction ===
In August 2016, Molina was appointed as the agency's Chief Internal Monitor in accordance with the Nunez Federal Consent Decree. He later was also appointed and served the dual role of Acting Assistant Commissioner of the Department's Nunez Compliance Unit. After the former commissioner's sudden departure Molina competed for the position of commissioner, but was not selected and left the Department. Molina would later go on to Westchester County Department of Correction and successfully navigate Westchester County DOC release from federal oversight.

=== New York City Taxi & Limousine Commission ===
In June 2017, Molina was appointed First Deputy Chief Enforcement Division by the former New York City Chair of the Taxi & Limousine Commission.

=== Westchester County Department of Correction ===
In March 2018, Molina was appointed First Deputy Commissioner for the Westchester County Department of Correction by Westchester County Executive George Latimer, placing Molina second in command of the largest Law Enforcement agency in Westchester County. While at Westchester County DOC Molina is credited with enhancing education program services for detainees to include college courses. He oversaw the integration of Westchester County Department of Social Service staff to streamline delivery of social service support upon discharge. He led the team that obtained 100% compliance with the 2016 United States Department of Justice settlement agreement, attaining substantial compliance on all the agreement provisions. Westchester County DOC experienced steady declines of Use of Force incidents every year during his tenure with the Department and increased access to justice by working with Legal Aid of Westchester County to open a satellite Legal Aid office inside the jail facility. Molina was recognized by the Criminal Justice Section of the New York State Bar Association with the inaugural Martin B. Adelman Memorial Award for his innovative work and his management of Westchester County DOC during the COVID-19 pandemic.

=== City of Las Vegas Department of Public Safety ===
In January 2021, Molina was appointed Chief of the City of Las Vegas Department of Public Safety, overseeing Deputy City Marshals, City's jail and Animal Control Officers

=== New York City Department of Correction ===
On December 16, 2021, Mayor-Elect Eric Adams appointed Molina, the 37th Commissioner of the New York City Department of Correction. He became the first Latino commissioner of the New York City Corrections Department. Upon his announcement, Adams announced that when taking office he would immediately re-institute solitary confinement. It was also noted during Adams' announcement that one of the primary reasons for his appointment was emotional intelligence, something that future appointments will be assessed on. Mr. Molina's tenure as Commissioner was controversial given a Federal Monitor reported Mr. Molina lacked transparency. At the time of his departure from the agency, a Manhattan federal court judge began considering a federal take over the jails.

On October 31, 2023, Molina was appointed Assistant Deputy Mayor of Public Safety. In that capacity, he reported directly to the Deputy Mayor of Public Safety.

=== New York City Department of Citywide Administrative Services ===
On June 3, 2024, Mayor Eric Adams appointed Molina, the 7th Commissioner of the New York City Department of Citywide Administrative Services. Molina had the responsibility of overseeing the agency responsible for managing the city’s recruitment and training, facilities, procurement procedures, municipal vehicle fleet, and initiatives aimed at decreasing carbon emissions from government activities. He resigned at the end of 2025.
