= Murder of Joseph Quinn =

American murder victim

Joseph Quinn
- Born: c. 1861
- Died: July 5, 1887 (aged 25–26); New York City, New York, United States
- Cause of death: Gunshot
- Allegiance: Whyos

Joseph Quinn (c. 1861 – July 5, 1887) was a New York clerk, amateur wrestler and murder victim of Danny Lyons, a co-leader of the Whyos street gang.

== Early life ==
Although reportedly described as a pimp and rival Five Points thug, Quinn is described in newspaper accounts as "a respectable young man, who for nine years past has been employed at the Cotton Exchange." A well-known local athlete, he was a skilled amateur wrestler as a member of the Pastime and New York Athletic Clubs, whose career included winning the latter organization's spring competition as well as the State Championship's middleweight "catch-as-catch-can" wrestler. He also appeared at the first exhibition held by the Crib Club on April 9, 1885 in a catch wrestling match with fellow Pastime Club member John O'Brien both scoring a fall each.

He would again face O'Brien in a catch-as-catch-can match, with each man gaining a pinfall before a draw was declared after wrestling another 10 minutes for the deciding third fall at an exhibition held by the New York Athletic Club on December 10, 1885.

== Murder ==
Although having no prior association to Lyons, the two men had recently been seeing a local woman, Kitty McGowan. Released from Sing Sing Prison only seven months before on burglary charges, Lyons confronted Quinn on the corner of Thirty-eighth Street and Second Avenue on the night of July 2, 1887. Although Quinn initially refused to fight, the two soon became involved in a heated argument resulting in Quinn striking Lyons, causing a cut above his left eye.

After this incident, Lyons reportedly swore revenge to friends in his neighborhood hangouts and, borrowing a revolver from friend Alexander Neil, he intended to shoot Quinn on sight next time they met. Asking around the neighborhood for Quinn, he failed to find him over the next two days and spent the next afternoon waiting at a Second Avenue liquor store.

At around 5:30 pm, Quinn arrived on a Second Avenue street car and got off at the upper crossing on Thirty-Eighth Street. Although Lyons was in full view, Quinn apparently did not notice him and continued toward his home.

As Quinn arrived at a butcher shop near his tenement building, Lyons ambushed him from the south side of the street and gunned him down as Quinn turned towards him. Shot in the abdomen, Quinn was carried into a nearby drug store where a Dr. C.W. Pfeiffer attempted to treat him. He was later taken by an ambulance to Bellevue Hospital and died of internal hemorrhaging an hour after his arrival.

=== Aftermath ===
Lyons quickly fled the scene, but he had been identified by numerous eyewitnesses, and police soon had a good description of him. However, as officers first arrived at the scene, a Joseph Vince was pointed out by a bystander and taken into custody. Vince, a cigarmaker who had originally emigrated from Germany, was later cleared of any involvement.

A citywide manhunt for Lyons was conducted by New York police soon after Quinn's murder. Capt. Ryan of the 21st Precinct stated to the press "If we don't get him, Inspector Byrnes's men will get him wherever he goes. The Inspector's officers have worked up a great many more difficult cases than this."

Although his wound was judged to be fatal upon an earlier examination by Dr. Pfeiffer, officials of Bellevue Hospital were criticized for the difficulty and delay in calling an ambulance. Records indicate that the hospital had not been informed of the shooting until 6:10 pm. More than a half an hour had passed as Quinn lay in the drug store when a young man entered the hospital to ask if an ambulance had been sent yet. Only then was an ambulance sent out and, by 6:25 pm, Quinn had been brought to the hospital. Quinn's death would eventually lead to improvements in the ambulance system.
