= Oak Hill High School =

Oak Hill High School may refer to:

- Oak Hill High School (Indiana), Converse, Indiana, US
- Oak Hill High School (Louisiana), Hineston, Louisiana, US
- Oak Hill High School (Maine), Wales, Maine, US
- Oak Hill High School (Ohio), Oak Hill, Ohio, US
- Oak Hill High School (West Virginia), Oak Hill, West Virginia, US

== See also ==
- Oak Hills High School, Cincinnati, Ohio
- Oak Hill School, Eugene, Oregon
- Oak Hill Academy (disambiguation)
