= Maya Angelou Academy =

American alternative school

Location
- east of Laurel in Anne Arundel County, Maryland; United States; 39°6′7″N 76°47′15″W

Information
- Former name: Oak Hill Academy
- Type: Alternative school
- School district: District of Columbia Department of Youth Rehabilitation Services
- NCES District ID: 1100087
- Trust: See Forever Foundation
- NCES School ID: 110008700213
- Chief Executive Officer: Robert Simmons III
- Principal: Felecia Hayward-Lawson
- Grades: 9–12
- Website: www.seeforever.org/schools/academy/
- Last updated: November 21, 2018

The Maya Angelou Academy at New Beginnings, renamed from Oak Hill Academy in May 2009, is an alternative school operated by the non-profit See Forever Foundation which manages Maya Angelou Schools. Named after American poet and civil rights activist Maya Angelou, the school is located east of Laurel, Maryland in Anne Arundel County. It is at the New Beginnings Youth Development Center, the District of Columbia's secure facility for youth who are adjudicated as delinquent and committed to its Department of Youth Rehabilitation Services (DYRS).

The See Forever Foundation began management of the academy in June 2007 upon winning a three-year $12 million contract. Founding principal David Domenici is the son of former New Mexico senator Pete Domenici. Domenici subsequently led the Consortium for Educational Excellence in Secure Settings. Maya Angelou visited the school on April 30, 2009, when it had 90 students, ranging from 14 to 19 years old.

While the See Forever Foundation operates other schools under the authority of the District of Columbia Public Charter School Board, Maya Angelou Academy is not affiliated with the DC PCSB.

Chelsea Clinton profiled the academy in 2012 for a video segment on NBC's Rock Center with Brian Williams. In 2014, a report by the Southern Education Foundation highlighted Maya Angelou Academy as a "successful model for teaching in locked facilities"; tests taken before and after students' 9-month incarceration at the school showed an average of 1.3–1.4 years of improvement.

In 2016, twice as many students who completed the program at Maya Angelou Academy at New Beginnings were working or attending school compared to records from 2007.
