= Department of Youth Rehabilitation Services =

Juvenile justice agency

Agency overview
- Formed: 2004
- Jurisdiction: District of Columbia
- Headquarters: Washington, D.C.
- Agency executive: Sam Abed, Director
- Parent department: District of Columbia government
- Parent agency: Office of the Deputy Mayor for Public Safety and Justice
- Website: dyrs.dc.gov

The Department of Youth Rehabilitation Services (DYRS) is the juvenile justice agency of the District of Columbia, in the United States.

== History ==
Marc A Schindler was the interim Director of DYRS from January 2010 to July 2010. He succeeded Vincent Schiraldi, who wrote in an op-ed column after leaving his post, that his tenure was marked by "both controversy and promises kept." He also mentions that at the time he left DYRS, "just 7 percent of DYRS-supervised youths are on runaway status today, compared with 26 percent in 2003. Homicides by youths in DYRS's care have fallen, from 1.1 percent of our youth in 2007 and 2008 to 0.7 percent in 2009, and in the past year juvenile homicide arrests citywide have declined at more than twice the rate of adult homicide arrests. Most important, the rate of recidivism for youths released from Oak Hill decreased 47 percent from 2004 to 2007."

In 2009, DYRS employees were investigated by the district's Attorney General for possibly having had sexual relations with a teenager under their care. In 2009, the Council for Court Excellence in a presentation before the DC Council Committee on Human Services communicated their "frustration" with the near absence of public information about DC's juvenile system and of DYRS's actual performance.

== Facilities ==
The Youth Services Center (YSC) in the District of Columbia is the DYS's youth detention center. It opened in December 2004. The District of Columbia Public Schools provides educational services for children in the center.

The New Beginnings Youth Development Center is DC's secure facility for adjudicated youth. The $46 million facility, located in Maryland City, Maryland (an unincorporated area in Anne Arundel County), near Laurel, opened in 2009. New Beginnings replaced the Oak Hill Youth Center, which was also located in unincorporated Anne Arundel County, .5 miles (0.80 km) from New Beginnings.
