= Oak Hill Elementary =

Oak Hill Elementary may refer to:

- St. Cloud School District, Oak Hill Elementary School, St. Cloud, Minnesota, United States
- Anne Arundel County Public Schools, Oak Hill Elementary School, Anne Arundel County, Maryland, United States
- Austin Independent School District, Oak Hill Elementary School, Austin, Texas, United States
- Blue Valley Unified School District, Oak Hill Elementary School, Kansas City Metropolitan Area, Kansas, United States
- Fairfax County Public Schools, Oak Hill Elementary School, Fairfax County, Virginia, United States
- St. Louis Public Schools, Oak Hill Elementary School, St. Louis, Missouri, United States
