= Red Rocks Farrell =

New York criminal; 19th century

- Red Rocks Farrell, photograph circa late 1870s-early 1880s
- Born: John Farrell c. 1857
- Occupation: Criminal
- Known for: Being a Bowery thief and member of the Whyos Gang

Prominent members of the Whyos Gang during its heyday in the late 1870s-early 1880s Top row left to right: Baboon Connolly, Josh Hines, Bull Hurley Middle row left to right: Clops Connelly, Dorsey Doyle, Googy Corcaran Bottom row left to right: Mike Lloyd, Piker Ryan, Red Rocks Farrell

John "Red Rocks" Farrell (c. 1857–?) was an American criminal, thief and member of the Whyos, a prominent New York street gang during the mid-to late 19th century. One of the more colorful members of the gang at the height of its power, he spent nearly half his life in correctional institutions.

In late 1891, Farrell was convicted of drugging and then robbing a man and sentenced to two years imprisonment in Sing Sing. He was released in November 1893 and returned to the Bowery where, two months later, he was charged with the robbery of an ex-police officer, 65-year-old James McGill, on the evening of January 9, 1894. McGill claimed that he had met Farrell and was invited to share a drink with him. McGill agreed but recalled losing consciousness after two drinks and awoke the next morning in a jail cell at the Eldridge Street Police Station. He was missing $140 in cash as well as his watch and chain, worth another $150. Farrell was arrested days later and tried at The Tombs police court where he faced a five-year prison sentence. Farrell is one of several Whyos to appear in the 2003 historical novel Dreamland by Kevin Baker.
