= Oak Hill Academy =

Oak Hill Academy may refer to:

- Oak Hill Academy (Maryland), Laurel, Maryland, former name of an alternative school operated by the District of Columbia for youth in its criminal justice system
- Oak Hill Academy (Mississippi), West Point, Mississippi, a private non-sectarian preK–12 school
- Oak Hill Academy (New Jersey), Lincroft, New Jersey, a private non-sectarian preK–8 school
- Oak Hill Academy (Ohio), a school operated in the 1880s by Stephen Morgan in Oak Hill, Ohio
- Oak Hill Academy (Virginia), Mouth of Wilson, Virginia, a private Baptist-affiliated boarding school known for producing basketball stars
