= Vincent Schiraldi =

American police officer

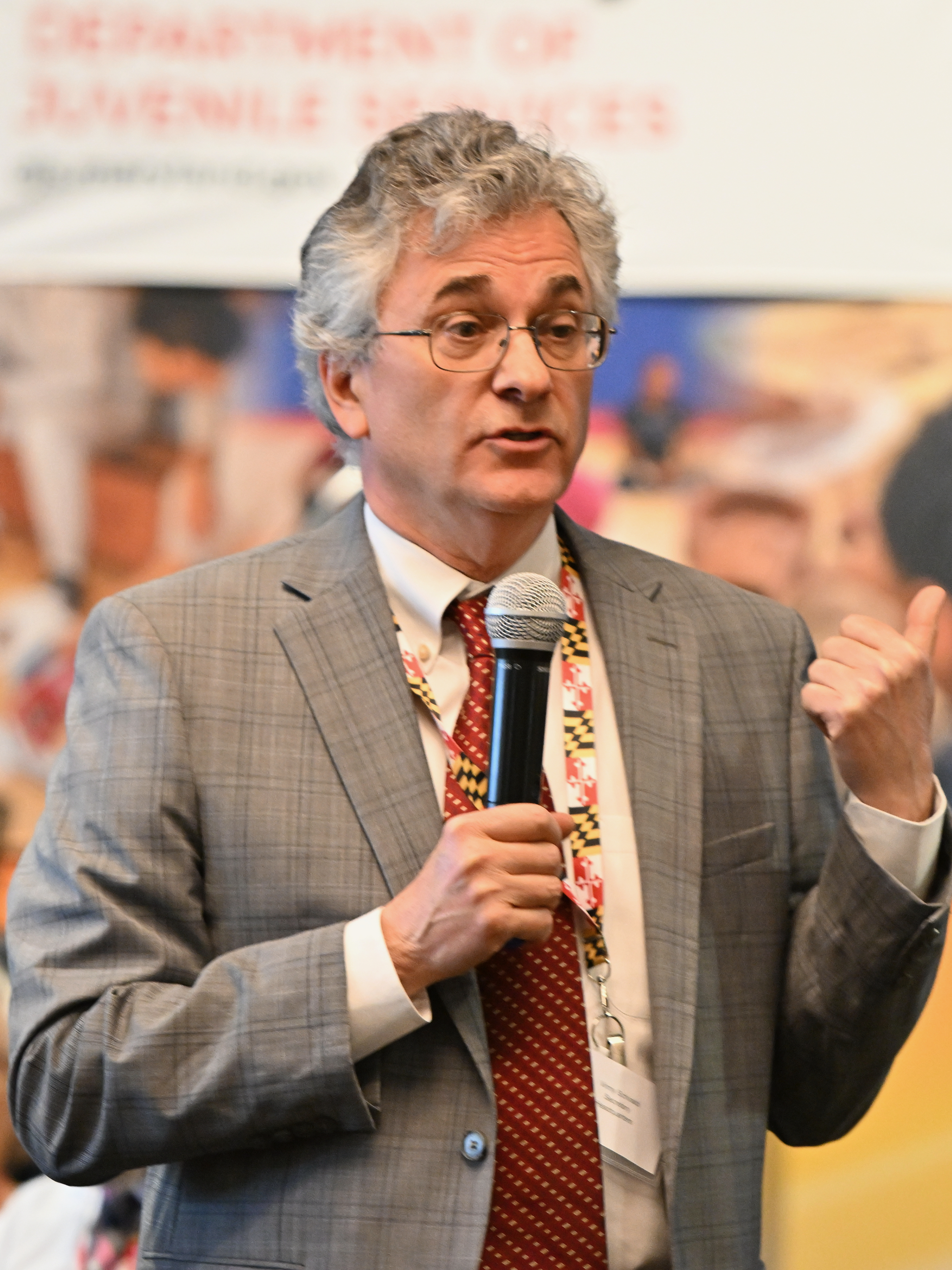

Maryland Secretary of Juvenile Services
- In office March 2, 2023 – June 9, 2025; Acting: January 18, 2023 – March 2, 2023
- Governor: Wes Moore
- Preceded by: Sam J. Abed
- Succeeded by: Betsy Fox Tolentino (acting)

36th Commissioner of the New York City Department of Correction
- In office June 1, 2021 – December 31, 2021
- Mayor: Bill de Blasio
- Preceded by: Cynthia Brann
- Succeeded by: Louis Molina

Personal details
- Born: Vincent N. Schiraldi; January 3, 1959 (age 67)
- Education: New York University (MSW); Binghamton University (BA)

Vincent N. Schiraldi (born January 3, 1959) is an American juvenile justice policy reformer and activist who served as the Maryland Secretary of Juvenile Services from 2023 to 2025. He was previously a senior research scientist at the Columbia University School of Social Work from October 2017 to January 2023. He is known for advocating for trying suspects under the age of 21 in juvenile court, and for programs that supervise older inmates and erase their records if they find a job. His advocacy for more lenient treatment of youth offenders has been controversial: youth advocates have praised his reforms for providing outlets for juveniles, while some law enforcement officers have questioned whether his policies have been too lenient.

== Biography ==
Schiraldi grew up in a working-class neighborhood in Brooklyn, New York. He attended Regis High School in Manhattan, received his Bachelor of Arts degree from Binghamton University and his MSW from New York University Silver School of Social Work. He reformed the Center on Juvenile and Criminal Justice in 1991, and served as its director until 2002, when he founded the Justice Policy Institute (JPI). He then served as the director of the JPI until 2005, when he became the administrator of the District of Columbia's Department of Youth Rehabilitation Services. As head of the Department, he argued that juveniles should not be punished as harshly, and that incentives are a better way to reduce juvenile misbehavior. In 2010, he became Commissioner of the New York City Department of Probation, a position he held until 2014, when he became a senior advisor to mayor Bill de Blasio in the New York City Mayor’s Office of Criminal Justice. From March 2014 to September 2015, he was senior advisor to Elizabeth Glazer, director of the Mayor's Office of Criminal Justice. He was a senior research fellow at Harvard University's Kennedy School of Government, heading the Program on Criminal Justice from 2015 until he joined Columbia's faculty in October 2017. In 2021, he was appointed Commissioner of the New York City Department of Corrections for the last seven months of Mayor Bill de Blasio's term.

== Maryland Secretary of Juvenile Services ==
On January 12, 2023, Governor-elect Wes Moore named Schiraldi as the Maryland Secretary of Juvenile Services. He took office in an acting capacity on January 18, 2023. His nomination was the most controversial of Moore's cabinet nominees, with Maryland Senate Republicans, including Senate Minority Leader Steve Hershey, saying that Schiraldi was "a little progressive for some of our members" and others scrutinizing his approach to juvenile justice. On February 21, the Maryland Senate voted 33–14 along party lines to approve Schiraldi's nomination, making him the only member of Moore's cabinet not to receive a unanimous vote.

In October 2024, after a Howard High School student with a prior criminal record was charged with first-degree murder, multiple Republican officials and Baltimore community members called for the removal of Schiraldi as Maryland Secretary of Juvenile Services. Schiraldi declined to step down, telling The Baltimore Sun that he agreed with community members' desires to see fewer crimes involving young people and was implementing a plan to deter juvenile crime through policies to hold offenders accountable while doing "all we can" to turn their lives around.

Schiraldi resigned as the Maryland Secretary of Juvenile Services on June 9, 2025, citing persistent negative media attention on him and a small number of youth committing crimes.

== Post-secretary career ==
In September 2025, Schiraldi joined the Pinkerton Foundation as a visiting fellow.
