= Josh Hines =

- Born: Richard Francis Hines; 1863; Worcester, Massachusetts, U.S.
- Died: 1928 (aged 64–65); Brooklyn, New York, U.S.
- Other names: Joshua Hines, John Murray, Robert Hayes, Richard F. Harden
- Occupation: Gangster

Prominent members of the Whyos Gang during its heyday in the late 1870s-early 1880s Top row left to right: Baboon Connolly, Josh Hines, Bull Hurley Middle row left to right: Clops Connelly, Dorsey Doyle, Googy Corcaran Bottom row left to right: Mike Lloyd, Piker Ryan, Red Rocks Farrell

Hines, born Richard Francis Hines, was a member of the mid-late 19th century Lower Manhattan gang, the Whyos. He was in and out of prison for much of his life until his final release from prison in 1911. He was first arrested for pick-pocketing in 1884 in Washington, D.C. at the inauguration of President Grover Cleveland. He was arrested three years later for the same or similar offenses at the Danbury Fair. He was arrested in 1889 for pick-pocketing in Lower Manhattan. In 1894, he was arrested for the same or similar offenses at Mardi Gras. In 1895, he was detained at the Tammany Hall Association parade in New York City.

Gang chroniclers Herbert Asbury (author, Gangs of New York) and Lucy Sante (author, Low Life) credit Hines as being the first man to hold up a stuss parlor and regularly robbing gambling houses. His aliases included John Murray, Robert Hayes, and Richard F. Harden.

In 1899, Hines reportedly shot “Big Stretch”, alias John McGann, in a saloon over a dispute. As no witnesses could be found, the charges were dropped.

== Death ==
Hines reportedly committed suicide in 1928 at age 65, in Brooklyn, New York.

== Sources ==
- Ettinger, Clayton James. The Problem of Crime. New York: R. Long & R.R. Smith (1932)
- Harlow, Alvin Fay. Old Bowery Days: The Chronicles of a Famous Street. New York: D. Appleton (1931)
- Terrett, Courtenay. Only Saps Work: A Ballyhoo for Racketeering. New York: Vanguard Press (1930)
