= The Tombs =

Detention complex in Manhattan, New York

Coordinates: 40°42′59.8″N 74°00′05″W

The Tombs (Manhattan Detention Complex)
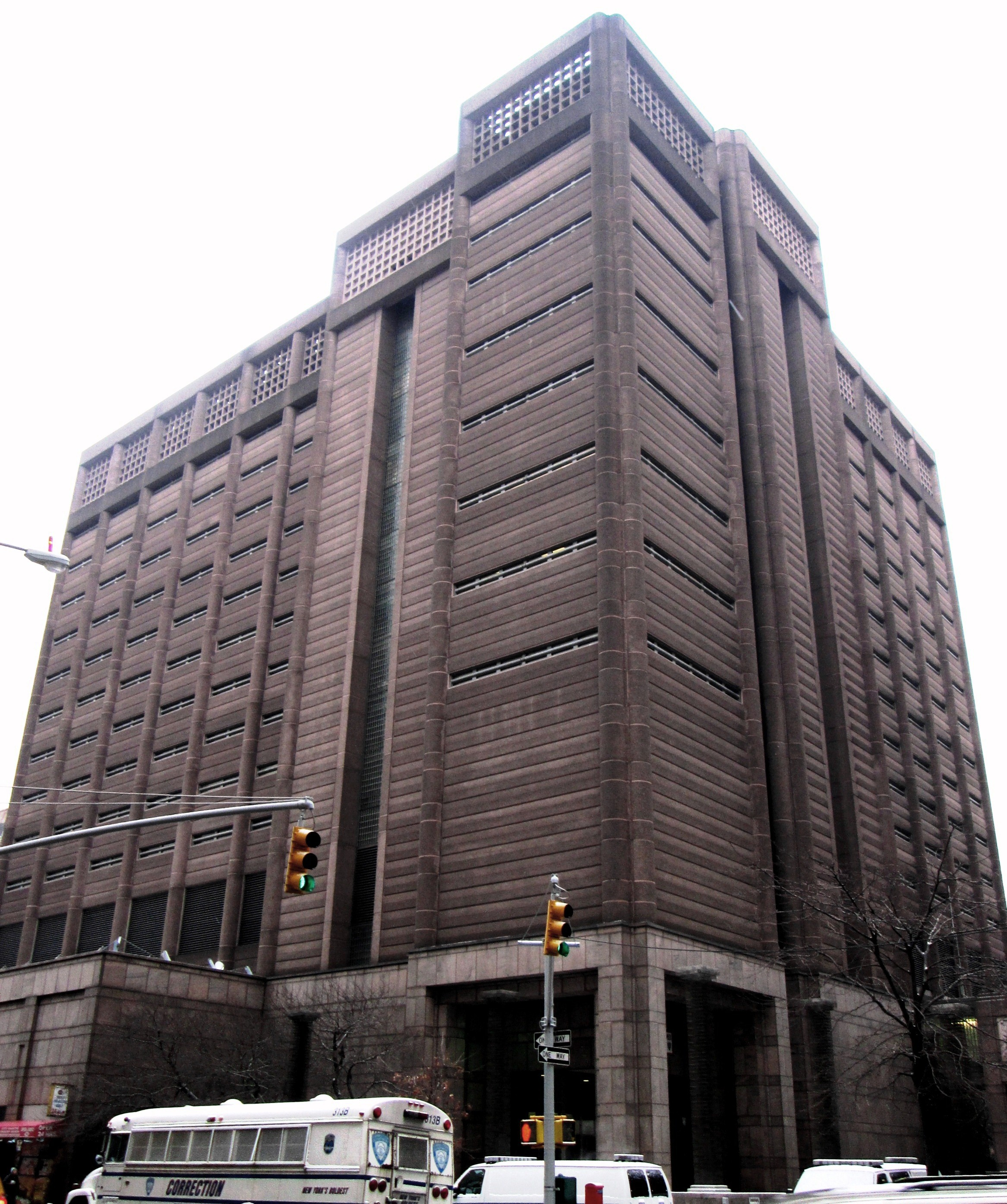
- The North Tower of the complex, February 2013
- Interactive map of The Tombs (Manhattan Detention Complex)
- Location: New York City
- Status: Active
- Security class: Municipal Jail
- Opened: 1838 (original building)
- Former name: Halls of Justice, Manhattan House of Detention
- Managed by: New York City Department of Corrections
- Director: Commissioner Lynelle Maginley-Liddie

The Tombs was the colloquial name for the Manhattan Detention Complex, a municipal jail at 125 White Street in Lower Manhattan, New York City. It was also the nickname for three previous city-run jails in the former Five Points neighborhood of lower Manhattan, in an area now known as the Civic Center, which encompasses New York City Hall, 1 Police Plaza, the courthouses in Foley Square, and the surrounding area.

The original Tombs was officially known as the Halls of Justice, built in 1838 in an Egyptian Revival architectural style, similar in form to a mastaba. It may have been this style that caused it to be called "the Tombs," although other theories exist. Charles Dickens wrote about it in American Notes for General Circulation. The Halls of Justice were built as a replacement for the Colonial-era Bridewell Prison located in City Hall Park, built in 1735. The new structure incorporated material from the demolished Bridewell to save money.

The four buildings, over time, known as The Tombs were:

- 1838–1902, New York City Halls of Justice and House of Detention
- 1902–1941, City Prison
- 1941–2023, Manhattan House of Detention (which became Manhattan Detention Complex South Tower in 1983)
- 1990–2023, Manhattan Detention Complex North Tower

Briefly the Bernard B. Kerik Complex in 2001–2006, its demolition began on the latter two buildings in 2023, in preparation for a controversial new jail building at the same address.

== History ==
=== Halls of Justice and House of Detention, 1838–1902 ===
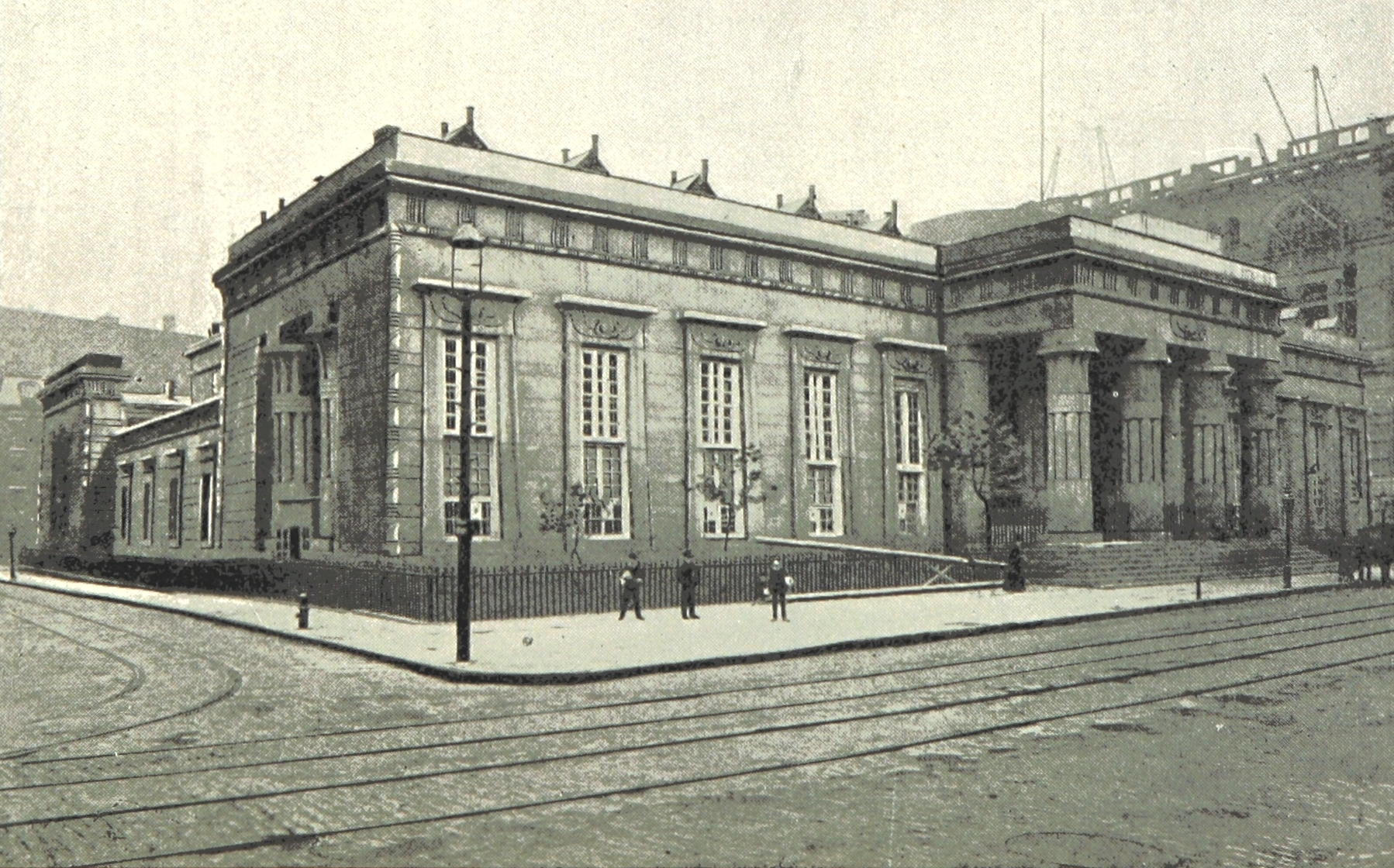
The original Egyptian Revival-style Tombs building is shown in a photograph from 1893; Leonard Street, left; Centre Street, foreground

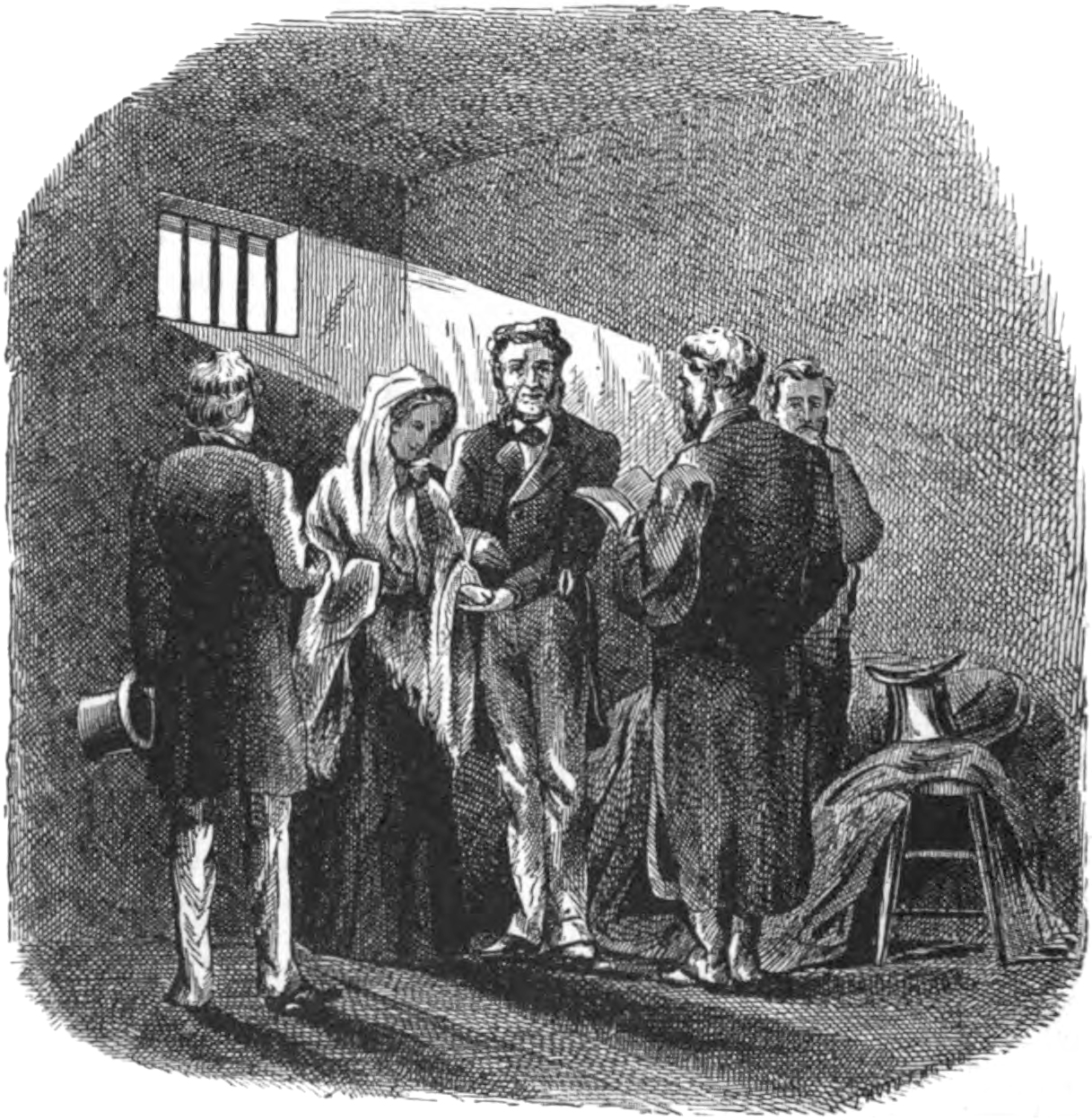
Artist's depiction of the wedding of John C. Colt in The Tombs, 1842

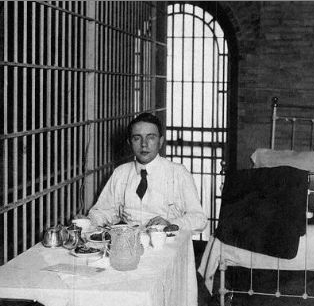
Harry Kendall Thaw, killer of architect Stanford White, in his cell, 1912

The first complex to have the nickname was an Egyptian Revival design by John Haviland completed in 1838. There was a rumor at the time that the building was inspired by a picture of an Egyptian tomb that appeared in John Lloyd Stephens' Incidents of Travel in Egypt, although this appears to be untrue. The building was 253 feet, 3 inches in length and 200 feet, 5 inches wide, and it occupied a full block, surrounded by Centre Street, Franklin Street, Elm Street (today's Lafayette), and Leonard Street. It initially accommodated about 300 prisoners, and $250,000 was allocated in 1835 to build it. Various cost overruns occurred prior to its completion.

The building site had been created by filling in the Collect Pond which was the principal water source for Colonial New York City. Industrialization and population density by the late 18th century resulted in the severe pollution of the Collect, so it was condemned, drained, and filled in by 1817. The landfill job was poorly done, however, and the ground began to subside in less than 10 years. The resulting swampy, foul-smelling conditions transformed the neighborhood into a slum known as Five Points by the time that prison construction started in 1838. The heavy masonry of Haviland's design was built atop vertical piles of lashed hemlock tree trunks in a bid for stability, but the entire structure began to sink soon after it was opened. This damp foundation was primarily responsible for its unsanitary conditions in the decades that followed. Charles Dickens wrote about the jail in his travelogue American Notes for General Circulation: "Such indecent and disgusting dungeons as these cells, would bring disgrace upon the most despotic empire in the world!"

The Tombs' formal title was The New York Halls of Justice and House of Detention, as it housed the city's courts, police, and detention facilities. Although a notable example of Egyptian Revival architecture, opinion varied greatly concerning its actual merit. As Dickens wrote: "What is this dismal fronted pile of bastard Egyptian, like an enchanter's palace in a melodrama?"

The prison was well known for its corruption and was the scene of numerous scandals and escapes during its early history. A fire destroyed part of the building on November 18, 1842, the same day that a notorious killer named John C. Colt was due to be hanged. Apparently it was an escape attempt on Colt's part that failed, and he fatally stabbed himself in his cell. Convicted murderer and New York City politician William J. Sharkey earned national notoriety for escaping disguised as a woman on November 22, 1872. He was never captured, and his fate is unknown.

Rebecca Salome Foster, a prison relief worker and missionary, became known as "the Tombs Angel" for her efforts to help and advocate on behalf of the many poor people held in squalid conditions at the Tombs. A monument to Foster, built in 1902 and put in storage in 1940, was rededicated in 2019 in the New York State Supreme Court's lobby.

=== City Prison, 1902–1941 ===
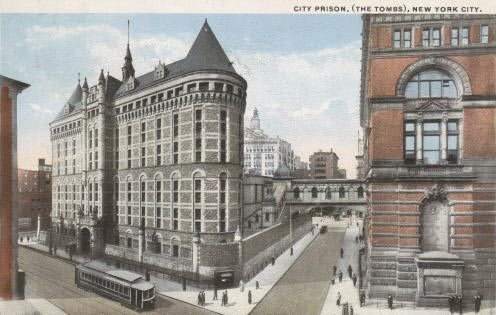
The "Bridge of Sighs" connecting the 1902 Tombs prison at left with the 1894 Manhattan Criminal Courts building, looking west from Centre Street

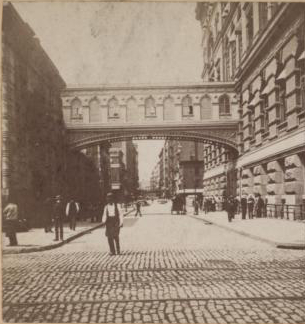
The Bridge of Sighs c. 1896

In 1902, the 1838 building was replaced by a $1 million city prison featuring an eight-story Châteauesque facade with conical towers along Centre Street, bounded by Centre, White, Elm (today's Lafayette), and Leonard Streets.

The architects were Frederick Clarke Withers and Walter Dickson from Albany, who had been partners since the 1880s. This was their final major commission. In September 1900, the architects complained that construction would be delayed for a year and cost an additional $250,000 due to the unnecessary insertion of corrupt Tammany Hall architects Horgan and Slattery into the project. The building was connected to the 1892 Manhattan Criminal Courts Building with a "Bridge of Sighs," crossing four stories above Franklin Street. There was also an Annex with another 144 cells that had been finished in 1884.

A newspaper photo in 1912 shows Harry Kendall Thaw in The Tombs prison seated at a formal table setting, dining on a meal catered for him by Delmonico's restaurant. He was given preferential treatment; instead of the standard-issue jail cell cot, during his confinement Thaw slept in a brass bed. Exempted from also wearing prisoner's garb, he was allowed to wear his own custom-tailored clothes. The jail's doctor was induced to allow Thaw a daily ration of champagne and wine. In his jail cell, it was reported that Thaw heard the heavenly voices of young girls calling to him, which he interpreted as a sign of divine approval. He was unshakable in his belief that the public would applaud the man who had rid the world of the menace of Stanford White.

=== Manhattan House of Detention, 1941–1974 ===
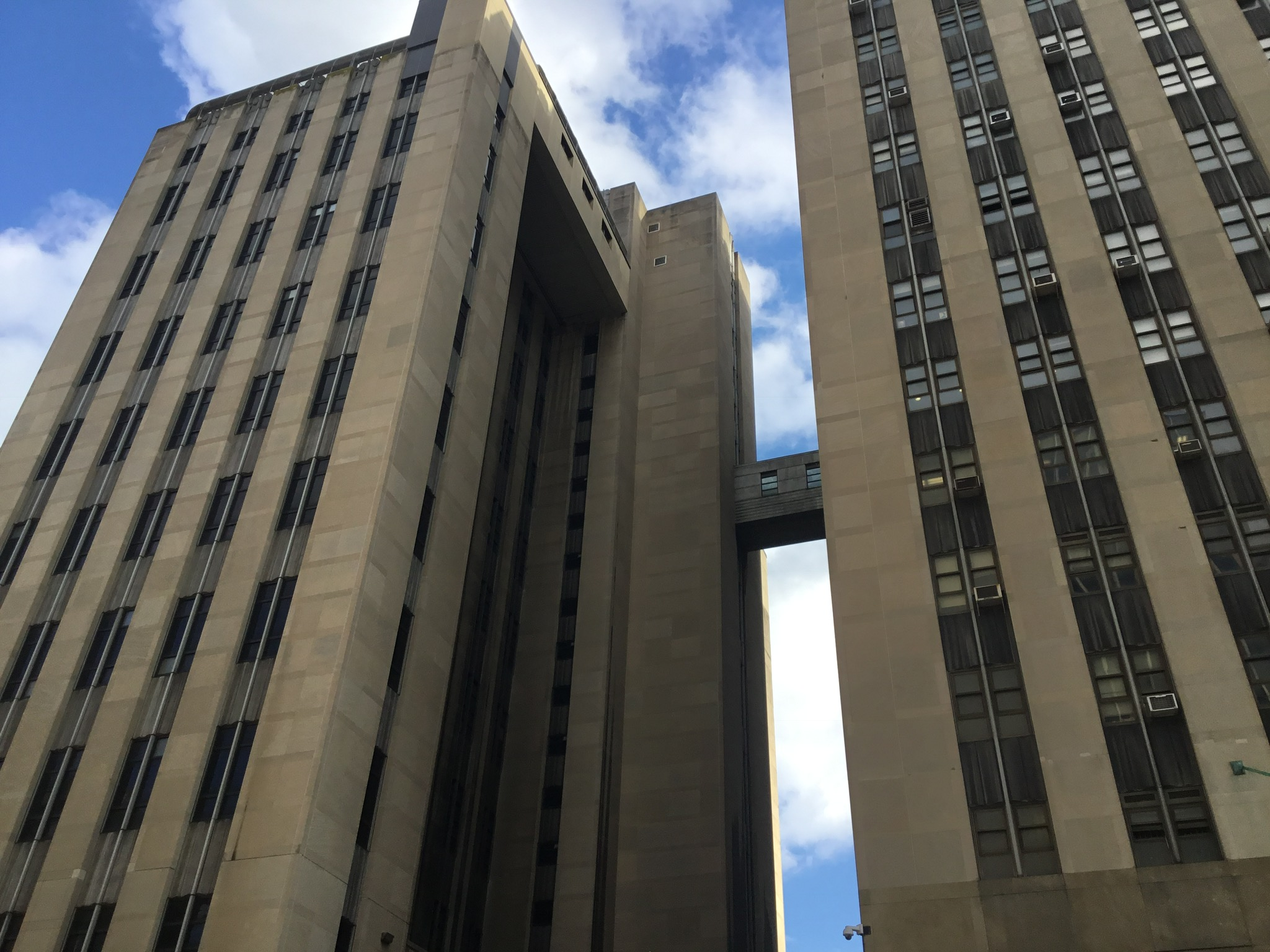
The Manhattan House of Detention (left) was built in 1941, at the same time as the Manhattan Criminal Courthouse (right). It became the South Tower of the expanded and was renamed Manhattan Detention Complex once the new North Tower opened in 1990.

The 1902 prison was replaced in 1941 by a high-rise facility across the street on the east side of Centre Street. The 795,000-square-foot (73,900 m^{2}) Art Deco architecture facility was designed by architects Harvey Wiley Corbett and Charles B. Meyers.

The facility is the northernmost of the four 15-story towers of the New York City Criminal Courts Building at 100 Centre Street, bounded by Centre, White, and Baxter Streets, and Hogan Place. The three southern towers are wings of a single integrated structure sharing a five-story "crown" which house the city's Criminal and Supreme Courts, city offices, and various departments, including the headquarters of the Department of Correction. The northern tower is freestanding, with the separate address of 125 White Street. It was officially named the Manhattan House of Detention for Men (MHD), although it was still referred to popularly as The Tombs.

By 1969, the Tombs ranked as the worst of the city's jails, both in overall conditions and in overcrowding. It held an average of 2,000 inmates in spaces designed for 925. Inmates rioted on August 10, 1970, after multiple warnings about falling budgets, aging facilities, and rising populations, and after an informational picket of City Hall by union correctional officers drawing attention to the pressures. Rioters took command of the entire ninth floor, and five officers were held hostage for eight hours, until state officials agreed to hear prisoner grievances and take no punitive action against the rioters. Despite that promise, Mayor John Lindsay had the primary troublemakers shipped upstate to the state's Attica Correctional Facility which likely contributed to the Attica Prison riot about a year later.

Within a month after the riot, the New York City Legal Aid Society filed a landmark class action suit on behalf of pre-trial detainees held in the Tombs. The city decided to close the Tombs on December 20, 1974, after years of litigation and after federal judge Morris E. Lasker agreed that the prison's conditions were so bad as to be unconstitutional. They shipped the remaining 400 inmates to Rikers Island, where conditions were not much better.

=== Manhattan Detention Complex, 1983–2024 ===
The Manhattan Detention Complex consisted of a South Tower, the former Manhattan House of Detention remodeled and reopened in 1983, and a North Tower across White Street, completed in 1990. The complex housed only male inmates, most of them pretrial detainees. The total capacity of the two buildings was nearly 900 people. The jail was named the Bernard B. Kerik Complex in December 2001 at the direction of then-New York City Mayor Rudolph Giuliani. Kerik was commissioner of the New York City Department of Corrections from 1998 to 2000 before becoming police commissioner. After he pleaded guilty to two misdemeanors in 2006, committed during his tenure as a city employee, subsequent Mayor Michael Bloomberg ordered Kerik's name removed.

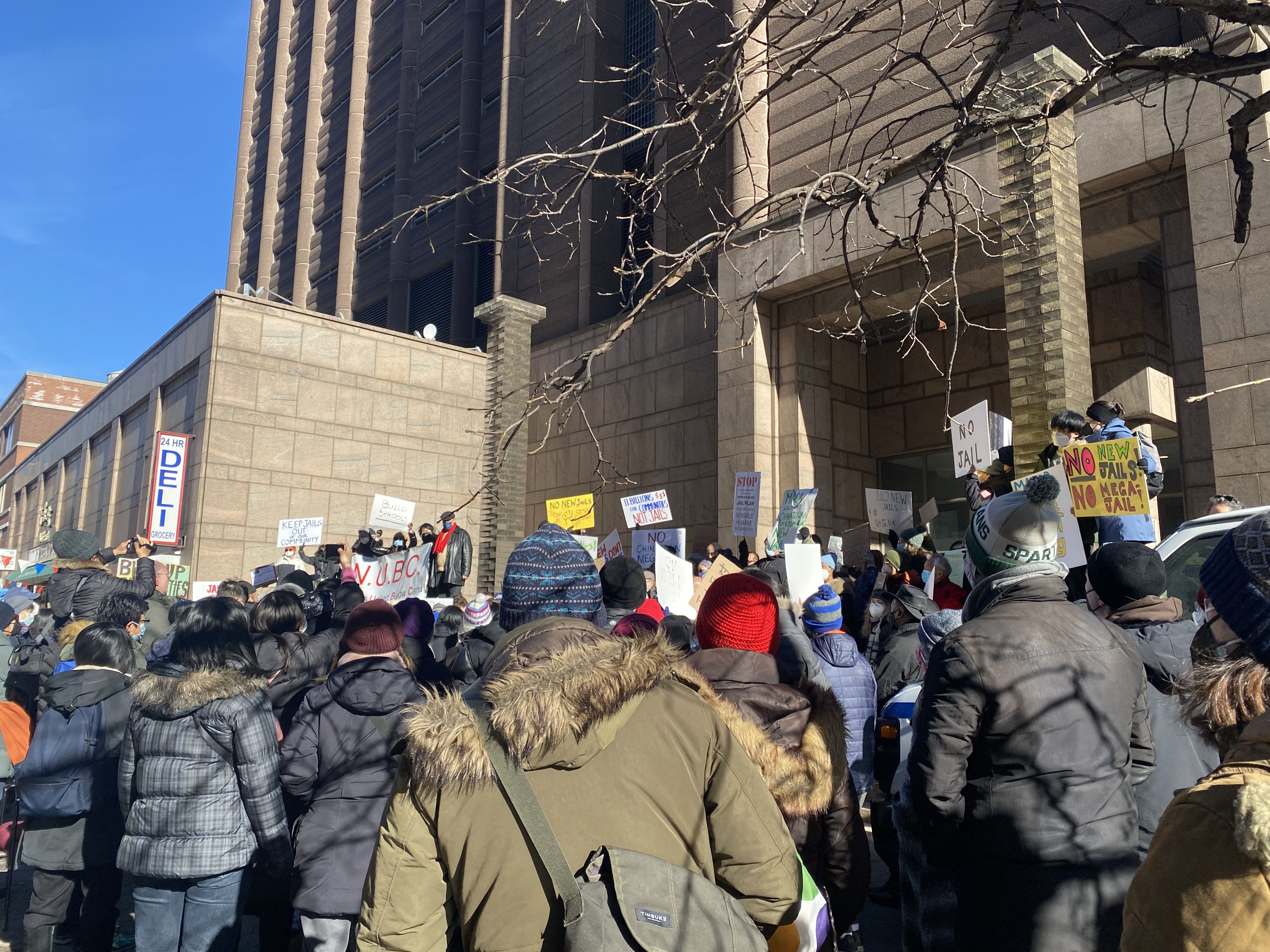
Rally in front of The Tombs to stop the construction of a new jail, 2022

In 2019, the New York City Council announced plans to build four new jails citywide to replace Rikers Island, including a high-rise jail tower on the site of the Tombs. The New York Daily News reported that the city planned to close the complex prior to the end of November 2020. The demolition of the Tombs attracted criticism from landlords, local residents, and prison-reform advocates. Opponents claimed the redevelopment would harm local residents and businesses. An injunction preventing the jail tower's construction was issued by the New York Supreme Court in 2020 but was overturned the next year. Two artists also filed a lawsuit to preserve artwork that was displayed on the Tombs' facade, but U.S. district judge Lewis A. Kaplan declined to grant an injunction, and seven murals were subsequently removed. The demolition of the Tombs was finally approved in April 2023 but was paused after further objections.

Demolition continued despite objection by local residents and was completed in August 2024. A neighboring senior residence and health clinic suffered buckling and cracks during its demolition.

=== New Chinatown jail complex, 2025–present ===
Plans for the new jail were presented to the city government in late 2025 by city representatives and the architecture firm HOK by then already over budget by $1.5 billion. City officials announced in January 2026 that construction would begin shortly and it is expected to be completed in 2032.

== Notable people ==
- Edward Coleman, first prisoner executed at the prison in 1839
- Rebecca Salome Foster, prison relief worker (1848–1902) known as one of "The Tombs Angels"
- Danny Lyons, executed at the prison in 1888
- Ernestine Schaffner, prison relief worker (c. 1828–1902) known as the other of "The Tombs Angels"
- William M. Tweed, head of the Tammany Hall political ring, spent a year in the Tombs after his second trial in 1873
- Morris U. Schappes, American educator, writer, radical political activist, historian, and magazine editor, incarcerated there after a 1941 perjury conviction obtained in association with testimony before the Rapp-Coudert Committee (investigating Communism in education in New York)
- Vojislav Stanimirović (crime boss) YACS
- In November 2000, 16 people associated with the Opie and Anthony WNEW radio show were arrested and held in The Tombs overnight during a promotion for "The Voyeur Bus", a mostly glass bus carting topless women through Manhattan with a police escort.
