= Annie Reilly =

American thief and con woman

Little Annie
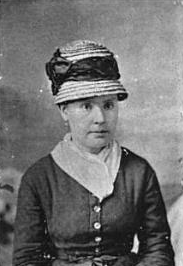
- Born: Annie Reilly c. 1844; Ireland
- Died: United States
- Other names: Kate Cooley, Kate Connelly, Kate Manning
- Occupation: Criminal
- Known for: New York thief, con artist; member of Marm Mandelbaum's inner circle from 1860s to 1870s
- Height: 5 ft 1 in (155 cm)

"Little" Annie Reilly (c. 1844–unknown), also known under the aliases Kate Cooley, Connelly and Manning, was a 19th-century American thief and con artist widely regarded as "the cleverest woman in her line in America". A well-known member of New York's underworld, she was part of an elite "inner circle" of female career criminals under Marm Mandelbaum during the 1860s and 1870s. These included some of the most notorious thieves, blackmailers and confidence women in the country such as Lena Kleinschmidt, Sophie Lyons, Kid Glove Rosey, Queen Liz, Big Mary and Old Mother Hubbard

== Biography ==
Annie Reilly was born in Ireland in about 1844. She later emigrated to the United States and settled down in New York City where Reilly found employment as a servant and child's nurse. She was said to look much younger than her age and was both charming and intelligent. She spoke at least two or three languages. Once gaining the confidence of the lady of the house, most often by making "a great fuss over the children", she would rob the house of its valuables, usually jewelry, sometimes valued as much as four to five thousand dollars. She rarely stayed in one place for long, waiting only one or two days before robbing her employers, and eventually became known up and down the Eastern seaboard. She became especially infamous in New York, Brooklyn and Philadelphia and was considered "the cleverest women of her line in America".

It was during this time that Reilly became associated with Marm Mandelbaum, then one of the biggest criminal fences in the city, and eventually became part of an elite "inner circle" of female career criminals which included Lena Kleinschmidt, Sophie Lyons, Kid Glove Rosey, Queen Liz, Big Mary and Old Mother Hubbard, These women would meet often at extravagant dinners hosted by Mandelbaum where it was said they discussed their latest criminal escapades.

In early 1873, Reilly was finally apprehended in New York after robbing the East 84th Street home of Mrs. A.G. Dunn among others. Held in custody in default of $6,500 bail, she was tried in the Court of General Sessions by Judge Sutherland, convicted of grand larceny and sentenced to 4 1/2 years in New York State Prison on April 23, 1873. She was then using the name Kate Connelly. Three years after her release, she was again arrested on August 3, 1880, for stealing from the Second Avenue home of Mrs. Evangeline Schwarz. She was convicted on September 8, under the alias Kate Cooley, and sentenced by Judge Gildersleeve to three years imprisonment on Blackwell's Island.

She immediately returned to her criminal activities following her release in January 1883. Reilly remained active in and around New York and, while employed at the New York Hotel, was responsible for the theft of $3,500 worth of jewelry and other valuables from guests. She soon moved on to Brooklyn where, under the name Kate Manning, she was arrested for the theft of a watch and chain from Charles A. Jennings on June 5, 1884. A stolen bronze statuette was found in her possession at the time of her arrest. She pleaded guilty in court and was sentenced to another 4 1/2 years in the Kings County Penitentiary. Her criminal career was among those featured in Thomas F. Byrnes' "1886 Professional Criminals of America" (1886). As of 1886, she had stolen more property in the last fifteen years than any other female thief in the United States.
