= Queen Liz (criminal) =

American thief and pickpocket

- Occupation: Criminal
- Known for: New York thief and pickpocket; member of Marm Mandelbaum's "inner circle" during the 1860s and 70s.

Queen Liz was the pseudonym of an American thief and pickpocket who was a prominent member of New York's underworld during the mid-to late 19th century. She was among the elite "inner circle" of female career criminals under Marm Mandelbaum during the 1860s and 1870s. Among these included fellow thieves, blackmailers and confidence women such as Lena Kleinschmidt, Sophie Lyons, Kid Glove Rosey, Little Annie, Big Mary and Old Mother Hubbard, all of whom were regular guests at her extravagant dinner parties.
