= Margaret Brown (criminal) =

American criminal

Old Mother Hubbard
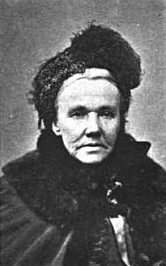
- Born: Margaret Brown c. 1828; Ireland
- Died: Unknown
- Other names: Margaret Young; Margaret Haskins
- Occupation: Criminal
- Known for: New York thief and shoplifter; member of Marm Mandelbaum's "inner circle" during the 1860s and 1870s.

Margaret Brown (born c. 1828) was an Irish-born American criminal and thief in New York during the late 19th century. She was most widely known under the name Old Mother Hubbard, after the nursery rhyme of that name, which was popular at the time. Among her aliases she also included the surnames Young and Haskins. She was one of the most well-publicized female thieves in the United States during the mid-to late 19th century and was part of Marm Mandelbaum's "inner circle" which included other notorious women such as Big Mary, Sophie Lyons, Queen Liz and Lena Kleinschmidt.

== Biography ==
Born in Ireland, she became a prominent shoplifter and pickpocket specializing in stealing handbags. Although occasionally employed as a housekeeper at times, she enjoyed a career lasting over fifty years. She was eventually arrested in Chicago, Illinois and sentenced to three years imprisonment at Joliet Prison where she would suffer serious injuries in a failed escape attempt.

After being discharged from Joliet Prison in 1878, she resumed her criminal career in major cities including St. Louis, Philadelphia and New York before her arrest in Boston on March 24, 1883. Arrested while attempting to steal a handbag from R.H. White's dry goods store, she served a six-month prison sentence in the Boston House of Corrections. Following her release, she traveled to New York where she was again apprehended for stealing a pocketbook from Brooklyn resident Mrs. H.S. Dennison while in Macy's on Fourteenth Street on March 26, 1884. She was again convicted and sentenced to three months at Blackwell's Island.

Released on July 2, she was arrested as she was leaving the penitentiary on Blackwell's Island and returned to Boston for trial, for stealing a purse containing $260 from a Mrs. Coburn in a Boston store. The New York Times reported that police records showed she had been a criminal for 50 years. She was returned to Boston where she was convicted of larceny. Although sentenced to two years in Boston House of Correction in late July, she was eventually transferred to Deer Island due to her old age and infirmity.
