= Abe Greenthal =

American criminal

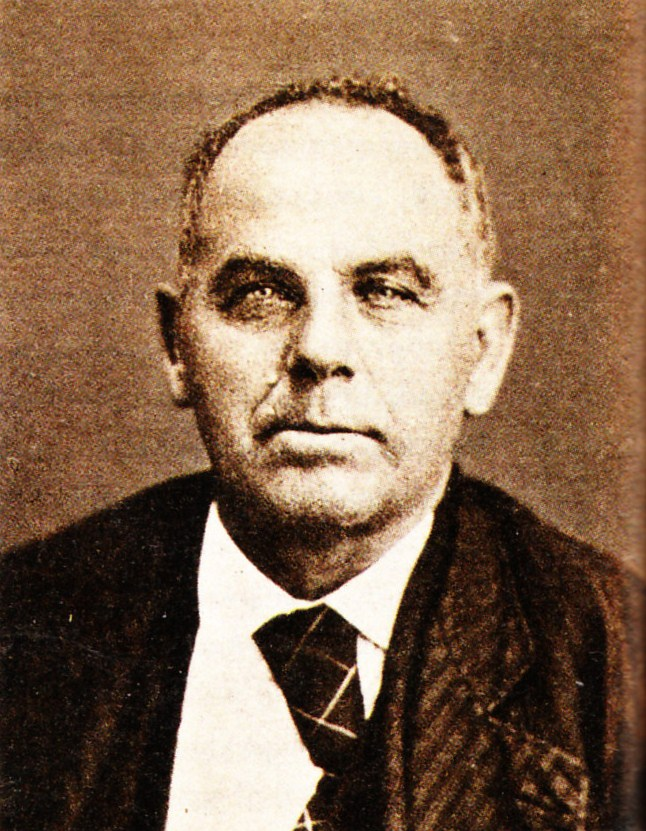
- Greenthal in March 1877
- Born: January 9, 1822; Betsche, Prussia
- Died: November 17, 1889 (aged 67); Harlem, New York City
- Resting place: Salem Fields Cemetery, Brooklyn
- Other names: Abraham Green, Abraham Leslie, "The General"
- Occupation: criminal
- Known for: pickpocketing

Abraham Greenthal (January 9, 1822 – November 17, 1889), known as "The General," was an American criminal known as one of the most expert pickpockets in the nation. He was a thief and fence for more than 40 years, and led a nationwide ring of pickpockets.

== Biography ==
Greenthal was born in Betsche, Prussia (now Pszczew, Poland) in 1822, though like many Polish-Jewish immigrants of his era, he would later call himself German. He immigrated to the U.S. at a young age and soon entered a life of crime.

Greenthal made his home and base of criminal operations in New York City's Tenth Ward. He led the Sheeny Mob, a syndicate of Jewish pickpockets who worked across the country; "sheeny" was a derogatory term for an untrustworthy Jew. The gang's method was jostling into victims in crowded places, particularly train stations. Among his criminal associates were Greenthal's own family members. At the time of his death, The New York Times wrote that "[a]ll the Greenthal family have turned out to be criminals, the women being shoplifters and the men pickpockets." He also had "close 'business' relations" with notorious fence Fredericka Mandelbaum. Greenthal and his gang were among the many underworld figures represented by defense lawyer William F. Howe. He was arrested many times without being convicted, which The New York Times explained as the result of "the lavish use of money and the peculiar influences he could make use of."

Greenthal and his brother, Harris, and son-in-law, Samuel Casper, were all convicted in 1877 for robbing $1,190 in March 1877 from a farmer named William Jenkson traveling by train. They had followed Jenkson from Albany, where he had "flashed his newfound wealth," to Rochester, where the gang made a pretense of befriending him and helping him with his bags while Abe stole the farmer's pocketbook. They escaped from Rochester but were subsequently arrested in Syracuse. Abe was sentenced to 20 years' hard labor in Auburn State Prison, Harris was sentenced to 18 years, and Casper was sentenced to 15 years. Abe Greenthal was pardoned in 1884, however, by Governor Grover Cleveland, based on representations that his health was poor.

Greenthal was next arrested in Brooklyn on December 30, 1885, by New York City chief of detectives Thomas F. Byrnes, for robbing a resident of Williamsburg of $795. Greenthal pleaded guilty to second-degree grand larceny and was sentenced to five years in Crow Hill prison in Brooklyn. His sentence began on March 23, 1886, and he was released in late 1889. Greenthal died about three weeks after his release, at his daughter's home in Harlem, of illness aggravated by his imprisonment.

Greenthal was profiled by Byrnes in his 1886 book Professional Criminals of America, which called Greenthal "one of the most expert pickpockets in America." He is also the subject of a book, published in 2015 by Edward David Luft: Stop Thief! The True Story of Abraham Greenthal, King of the Pickpockets in 19th Century New York City, as Revealed from Contemporary Sources
