= Grady Gang =

Criminal organization in the 1860s

The Grady Gang was a New York City sneak thief gang during the 1860s. Organized by fence John D. "Traveling Mike" Grady following the American Civil War, the Grady Gang operated in Broadway's "Thieves Exchange" where Grady would regularly purchase up to $10,000 in stolen goods.

He soon formed his own gang from many of the prominent thieves of the decade including Billy "The Kid" Burke, "Boston" Pet Anderson, Hod Ennis, Eddie Pettengill and Jake Rand. The gang's most successful theft was the robbery of $2 million in cash and bank certificates from financier Rufus L. Lord on March 7, 1866. By the end of the decade, most of the gang members had retired; however, Grady would continue operating as a fence. Later, he competed against rival fence Marm Mandelbaum who had formed a gang of her own. Grady, however, bought out Mandelbaum by offering her gang members much higher prices than she could afford to pay and she was quickly eliminated as a competitor.
