= George Leonidas Leslie =

American bank robber and architect

- Born: 1842
- Died: 1878 (aged 35–36); New York
- Cause of death: Murder
- Body discovered: June 4, 1878, Mott's Woods near Yonkers, New York
- Resting place: Cypress Hills Cemetery
- Other names: George Howard, George Herbert
- Education: University of Cincinnati
- Known for: Bank robbery and architectural design
- Spouse: Mary Henrietta "Molly" Coath

George Leonidas Leslie (1842 – May/June 1878), who sometimes went by George Howard and George Herbert, was an American bank robber and architect. Known as the "King of Bank Robbers", he was involved in 80% of the bank robberies in the United States from 1869 to 1878.

Leslie grew up in Ohio, where he created a successful architectural firm. He closed it and left for New York City in 1869, due to ostracism over his evasion of the Union Army draft in the American Civil War. In New York, he met Fredericka Mandelbaum, a fence; she put Leslie in charge of a gang that stole almost $800,000 from the local Ocean National Bank in June 1869, the largest robbery in the city's history at the time. In 1876, Leslie was involved in the Northampton Bank robbery in Massachusetts, which netted $1.6 million. He was also involved in the robbery of Manhattan Savings Bank in New York City in 1878.

In 1878, Leslie attempted a bank robbery in Maine, where two of his gang's members murdered a cashier against Leslie's will. The gang became paranoid that Leslie would cooperate with Pinkerton investigators, and threatened him. In response, he delayed the Manhattan Savings Institution robbery in New York that he was planning with them, hoping to do it with another gang. He was killed before it happened, and police theorized someone in the gang murdered him over the Maine incident. His gang did the robbery by themselves; its investigation led authorities to finding out about Leslie's robberies. Both the Northampton and Institution robberies were the largest-paying robberies in history at the time.

== Early life ==
Leslie was born in 1842. His hometown was Cincinnati, Ohio. His family was wealthy, as his father was a successful beer magnate from Toledo. Leslie went to the University of Cincinnati, where he studied architecture and graduated as an honors student. He was the university's sharpshooting champion, but the recognition mattered little to him, as he did not care for guns. During the American Civil War, when Leslie was 21, the Union Conscription Act of 1863 called for all able-bodied males between 20 and 45 to be drafted into service for the Union army. Cincinnati was a large source of Union army troops. Leslie's father had bought him out of the draft for $300, which was highly unpopular; draft-dodgers were considered worse than deserters. After the war was over, Leslie was the subject of ridicule, and was ostracized by many friends and families in the area. The resentment "overwhelmed" him, and he was not able to escape ridicule at the university.

After graduating, Leslie was engaged to a woman named Sarah Lawrence, who was from a rich Cincinnati family and Sunday school. Her father agreed to the marriage, but was reluctant, as he was a Union veteran and Republican. Leslie's firm grew after being contracted to provide shovels for the construction of the United States' first transcontinental railroad. In May 1867, Ohioan and Union war hero Jacob Parrot returned to Cincinnati, and within months of his return, Lawrence broke off the engagement and married Parrot. Meddling from her father was likely behind the decision. That year, Leslie's parents died. He wanted adventure, and to escape the stigma of being a draft-dodger by becoming anonymous, so he sold his family's home, closed his firm, and moved to New York City at the age of 27.

=== Move to New York City and becoming a criminal ===
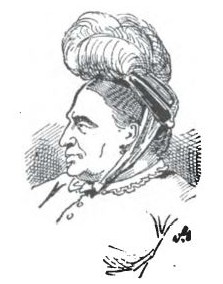
Fredericka Mandelbaum, who introduced Leslie to the criminal world

Once in New York, Leslie moved into the Fifth Avenue Hotel. He only knew a few people in the city, one of them being architect John Roebling. Leslie knew Roebling from his ties to Cincinnati; he had built the Cincinnati Suspension Bridge, which was completed in 1866. In New York, Roebling invited Leslie to dinner at the exclusive Delmonico's restaurant. During the dinner, Roebling introduced Leslie to one of the city's most important financiers, James Fisk. Leslie praised Fisk for his refurbishing of the Grand Opera House, and Fisk was flattered, offering Leslie two tickets to a play he produced, The Twelve Temptations. Leslie invited Josie Mansfield to the play, a wealthy guest at the dinner, a former showgirl from San Francisco who was Fisk's mistress. After the dinner, Leslie had stolen salt and pepper shakers from his table, just for the thrill of getting away with it. It inspired him to steal more. Mansfield eventually took a liking to him.

Fisk later sent Leslie an invitation to a private party held at 79 Clinton Street, the home of Fredericka "Marm" Mandelbaum, who was the biggest fence in the city. Leslie had heard about Mandelbaum and was intrigued, because he wanted to enter the criminal world. At the time, New York City had a series of loosely-knit gangs, including the gangs of Thomas "Shang" Draper, Johnny "The Mick" Walsh, and Mandelbaum. Leslie would associate with all three later.

== Method ==
Before every robbery, he would obtain, if possible, the building's blueprints. His architectural background allowed him to build scale models of his intended targets. Sometimes he would rent a safe-deposit box or open an account at a particular bank, which gave him an excuse to spend time in the building and observe its layout and operation. Other times he would get one of his men hired as a watchman or porter and ask them to obtain this information for him. When he was certain that the robbery could be committed without him getting caught, Leslie would select his accomplices and explain to them how to execute the robbery. Sometimes he would set up a room to resemble the inside of the target so that his men could practice the robbery while Leslie watched. He also had connections with a few crooked police officers and politicians, so it was less likely that he would be arrested.

Leslie had models of many vaults and safes used in the United States. Before he committed a robbery, Leslie would find out what type of vault or safe his target used. Then, he would spend months figuring out how to open it without the combination. Leslie used a device called the "little joker," a wire device inserted into a bank safe's lock in advance to facilitate the robbery. Over time and extended use, the lock's tumblers left dents or marks on the wire that recorded the numbers that made up the combination. Use of this tool required George to enter the bank at least twice prior to executing a robbery, once to place the device and a second time to retrieve it.

== Ocean National Bank robbery ==
The Ocean National Bank was located in Manhattan, New York City, on the corner of Greenwich Street and Fulton Street. It was located on the first of six stories of a brownstone building. The bank's robbery took place over a weekend in June 1869. At the time of the robbery, the offices included a large business room, the president's private room, and the vault. The entrance to the vault was made up of three separate iron doors.

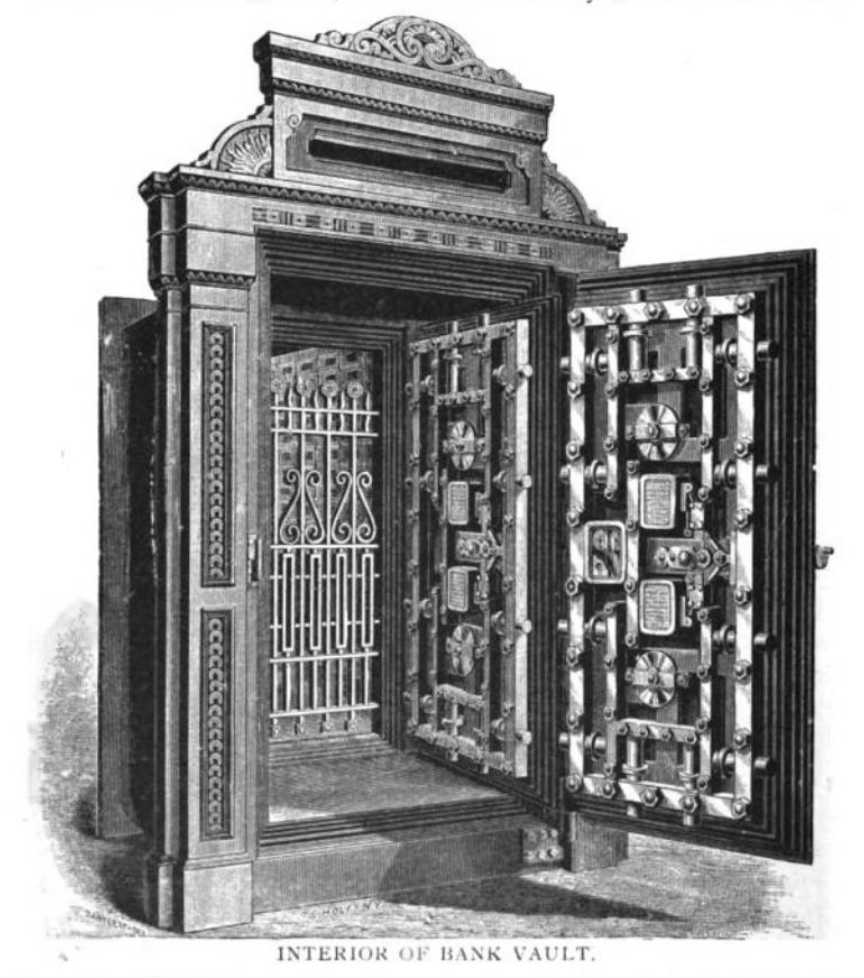
The interior of the Ocean National Bank's vault doors

Leslie promised to Mandelbaum to pull off the highest-paying criminal heist in history. Mandelbaum organized a gang to rob the Ocean National Bank, and put him in charge. The robbery would essentially function as Leslie's initiation and trial run for the city's crime world. Mandelbaum spent $3,000 on the robbery's planning. Planning for the heist took 3 months. Leslie's gang included Draper, Billy Porter, Gilbert Yost, "Jimmy" Hope, Johnny Dobbs, Johnny Irving, and John "Red" Leary. Leslie planned the robbery with more precision than any other bank robbery before him. Draper did not like the idea of a beginner heading a robbery, but Mandelbaum insisted and said he would not be involved if he did not take orders from Leslie. Draper was sure that Leslie would fail miserably, and instructed Leary to "take care of" Leslie if he did something stupid. Leary accepted, but was lying, as he was sure to follow Leslie's every order at Mandelbaum's behest. Irving got accepted at the bank as a cleaner, and Jimmy Hope used a disguise to rent office space in a basement right below the vault room.

On the first night, Friday, Irving worked his cleaning job and let Leslie, Dobbs and Leary in the back door. Dobbs removed the dial from the safe, inserted the little joker inside, and then replaced the dial. When the bank officials used the safe the next day, the little joker would record the combination stops on the lock. They decided to wait two days to open the safe, as the bank kept more money in the safe during the weekend than the weekdays. On the second night, Sunday, Leslie made Draper dress like a woman, which added to Draper's animosity of Leslie. The three iron doors were forced opened. The group drilled the hole from the basement to the vault, Dobbs removed the dial, then the little joker, then replaced the dial again. The little joker had etched a series of notches into a tin plate inside the dial. Dobbs used these notches to guess the combination, and opened the safe. $768,879.74 was robbed in cash, securities, and jewelry, and $1,806,598 was left. It was the largest heist in New York City at the time, but not the highest-paying criminal heist in history (it would go to the Manhattan Savings Institution robbery, which Leslie was involved in).

Police captain Thomas Brynes was put on the case. None of the detectives were able to uncover any leads. Brynes had noticed the withdrawal of money from Leslie, but considering he was an gentlemanly, educated architect, Brynes did not make him out to be a criminal. He learned that Leslie had visited Mandelbaum's dinner parties, and said "this can't lead to anything good."

== Activities from 1869 to 1872 ==
Between November 21 and November 22, 1869, Leslie robbed the Boylston National Bank in Boston, Massachusetts, of $400,000 to $500,000. The money was largely in United States bonds belonging to private individuals, located in 25-30 tin boxes.

Between 12 and 1 a.m. on April 26, 1870, Leslie robbed the Auburn City Bank in Auburn, New York, of $31,000 in cash.

At 10 a.m. on August 1, 1870, Leslie and others robbed the John Handley & Co. bank in Scranton, Pennsylvania, of $30,000 in currency. They entered the vault from the rear of the bank.

About 1870, Leslie made Philadelphia his headquarters, and stayed at a boarding house ran by Mary E. Coath. There he met her fifteen-year-old daughter, Mary Henrietta "Molly" Coath. Leslie married Molly Coath after a short courtship. Following their wedding, they moved to New York, where they lived a life of a society couple. Throughout some of their marriage, his wife was clueless about his criminal activity. When she did find out, Mrs. Leslie liked the money that he was making. She was fine with his criminal life, until she found out that Leslie was spending large amounts of time and money on different women. This eventually led to problems in his marriage and later in his gang.

In August 1872, the Trenton Bank in Trenton, New Jersey, was robbed of about $25,000 by Leslie and 6 others. Days before the gang had rented a building two doors down from the bank, under the pretense of setting up a millinery business.

On August 19, 1872, Leslie robbed Third National Bank in Baltimore, Maryland, of $234,000 to $250,000 in stocks, bonds, and other valuables. The vault had been entered from a large hole in an adjacent house. Three of the four safes inside the bank were pilfered.

Between 1 and 4 a.m. on October 14, 1872, nine robbers including Leslie stole $50,000 in stocks and bonds and $9,500 in money from the Saratoga County National Bank in Waterford, New York.

== Northampton Bank robbery ==
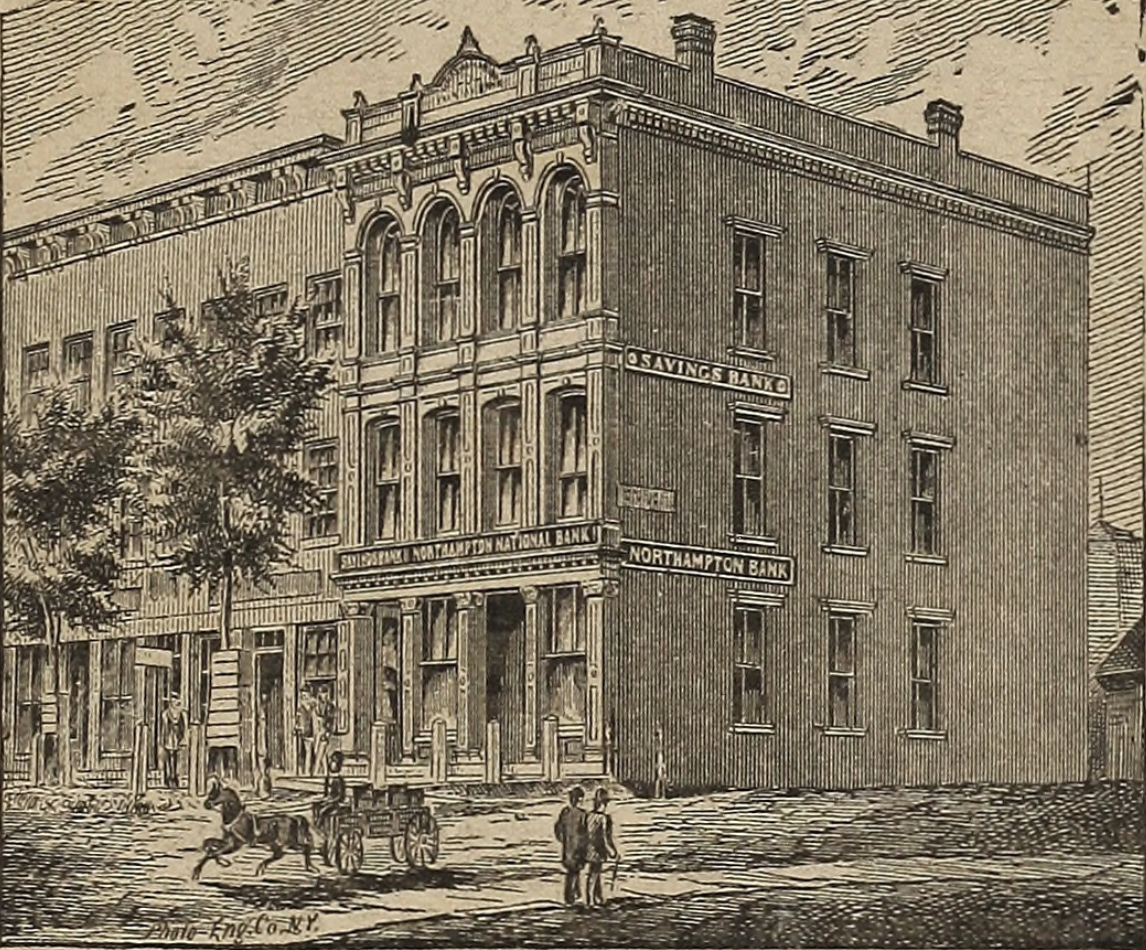
Northampton Bank at the time of its robbery

Northampton Bank was located in Northampton, Massachusetts, 150 miles from New York City. The robbery of January 26, 1876, was led by Thomas Dunlap, Robert Scott, and Leslie. Leslie planned it, but did not physically participate.

In 1874, the bank hired safe manufacturer Herring & Co. to install a new lock on the vault. Herring & Co. sent William Edson, a bank robber and traveling sales agent for the company. In 1875, he copied the key to the vault and to the bank and gave them to the Rufus Gang. Initially, Dunlap and Scott had asked Mandelbaum about their plan to rob the Northampton bank. Mandelbaum let the two contact Leslie, who agreed to mastermind the robbery for a fee of $20,000. "Billy" Connors was eventually involved. Leslie had never worked with Dunlap, Scott, or Connors before. They chose a code name for their group, which was the "Rufus Gang", named after Robert Scott. Northampton Bank was chosen because it had vaults and safes that were easy to open, and various sources claimed the vaults contained large cash reserves. They found out about the bank through Edson, who recommended the bank in exchange for a share of the stolen money. The amount agreed to was $50,000. Starting in September, the group, including Leslie, travelled between Brooklyn and Northampton, to plan and watch the bank employees and deputy sheriff. They planned how they would escape, and where they would hide the money. The attic of Bridge Street School was used as a base of operations. The gang spent several days observing the bank's cashier, Whittlesey.

On the night of the robbery, the gang, which included Dunlap, Scott, Connors, Draper, Irving, Porter, and Yost, entered Whittlesey's home. They woke everyone in the house up, made them dress, handcuffed them, and brought them into Whittlesey's room. They took Whittlesey downstairs and handcuffed him to a chair. Dunlap and Scott began their interrogation of him; Scott held a gun to Whittlesey's head, and Scott said he should give the numbers without hesitation. Whittlesey gave them false combination numbers; when he could not repeat the numbers, he was beaten. He eventually gave them the right combination. At the bank, 1.6 million ($26 million in 2019 dollars) in cash, bonds, and other securities (negotiable and non-negotiable) was robbed. After the robbery, Leslie cut ties with Dunlap and Scott over their use of violence, which was not a part of his plan. Edson was caught, and was freed after turning state's evidence. Dunlap, Scott, and member Billy Connors were sentenced to 20 years in prison. Scott eventually returned the securities to the bank in an unsuccessful attempt at gaining leniency. Leslie was not implicated until the investigation into the Manhattan robbery, but he was never convicted.

== Failed robbery of the Dexter National Bank ==
In mid-February 1878, Leslie's gang, which included Draper, Irving, Leary, Porter, and Yost, traveled separately to Dexter, Maine, in preparation to rob the Dexter National Bank (also called the Dexter Savings Bank). Leslie had secured the involvement of the bank's cashier, James Wilson Barron. Barron had a "great deal of animosity" towards the bank, for reasons he would not share to Leslie. When the gang got to Dexter, they stayed in a group of boarding houses around town. The plan was to knock on the door behind the bank, so Barron would be signaled to let them in, and give them the key to the inner vault. From there, Leslie would use the little joker. Irving would wait in a horse-drawn sleigh they would use as a getaway. The gang would then conceal the money and securities in a series of railway trunks, which Draper and Porter would ship from the Dexter train station to New York.

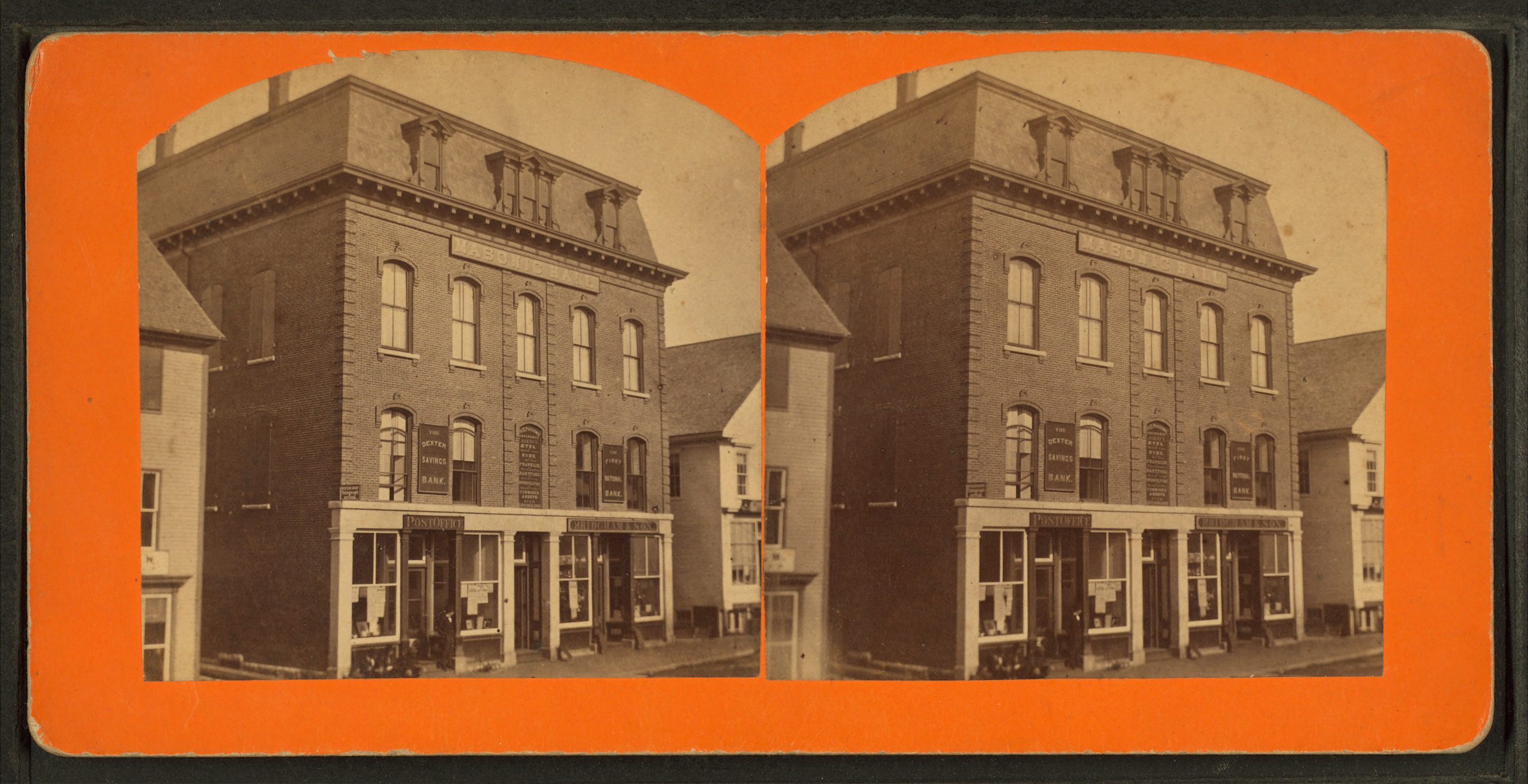
A stereoscopic view of the Dexter National Bank, circa 1868-1880

On the night of February 23, the gang met up in the alley behind the bank, and went to the side door. Leslie had given them disguises from the Grand Opera House, and shielded them from the street using a black theatrical screen, preventing a police patrolman who walked by from spotting them. In order to prevent the officer from coming back and noticing them, Porter left the alley and leaned on the front door, to suggest he was waiting for someone to open it. The group knocked on the side door several times, and Barron did not respond, so Leary busted it open. The gang (except Porter) went inside, and learned Barron had no intention of helping them now. He told Leslie he wanted to back out, but Leslie told him it was too late to do so. Leslie asked Barron for the key to the safe, and Barron refused to give it to him. Leslie then asked Barron to open the door to let Porter in, which Barron again refused; Draper and Leary then marched towards him, and Leslie unsuccessfully tried to stop them. Leary threatened to beat Barron until he gave the vault keys' location, and Draper pistol-whipped him with a revolver. Barron confessed the vault was on a timer, and could not be opened until the morning. Draper and Leary cuffed his hands behind his back, gagged him, and wedged him between the vault's inner and outer doors. Leslie again unsuccessfully tried to stop them. They closed the doors on Barron, then stole $500 from his pocketbook and $100 from a cash drawer. The gang left, and ran over to Irving's sleigh; Porter followed. Leslie was concerned about the use of violence and its potential effects, but Draper and Leary did not care.

Eventually, authorities found Barron wedged between the vault doors, and Barron died an hour after they found him. Leslie found this out by reading the next day's newspaper. The newspaper reported that Barron had been killed after he would not give up the bank combination, and that Pinkerton agents had been contacted to find those responsible. Leslie was concerned, so he laid low in Philadelphia for a few weeks, and told Molly to leave their home in New York and return to Philadelphia. He also got a gun, which was the first time he'd carried a gun during his entire criminal career.

=== Leslie's falling out with the gang ===
Leslie returned to New York and met with Draper and Leary in a saloon in Brooklyn. Draper accused Leslie of potentially giving up the group's names to the police. Leslie replied that Draper was a threat to the gang, and Draper lunged at Leslie. Leslie quickly toppled the table they were sitting at, and pointed a pistol at Draper. Leary calmed things down by saying he had no idea Barron would die, and that he wanted to teach him a lesson, not to kill him. The men discussed who would go to the police to save themselves. Leslie said Irving would do so, because of his drinking habit. Draper said that would not happen. He then said that he was tired of Leslie getting the biggest cut of their robberies, and that the spoils from then on would be split evenly. Leslie disagreed, and then Draper threatened to kill him, saying the others were on his side on the matter. The meeting ended with no conclusion.

Later, Draper informed Irving what Leslie had said about him at the saloon. Irving was furious and said he would find Leslie and kill him that day. Draper called him down, and said they should keep an eye on Leslie. Mandelbaum warned Leslie that Draper and Irving were dangerous, and that even though they followed her orders, she could not control them if their lives were in danger. To calm things, she suggested she would split the robbery cuts between the gang members based on how important she felt their services were worth, which Leslie disagreed with. Draper and Irving later told Leslie they would kill him if they found out he was working with the police or Pinkertons. Leslie thought that the gang, police, or Pinkertons would come for him eventually, and started making plans to protect himself.

== Planning of the Manhattan Savings Institution robbery ==
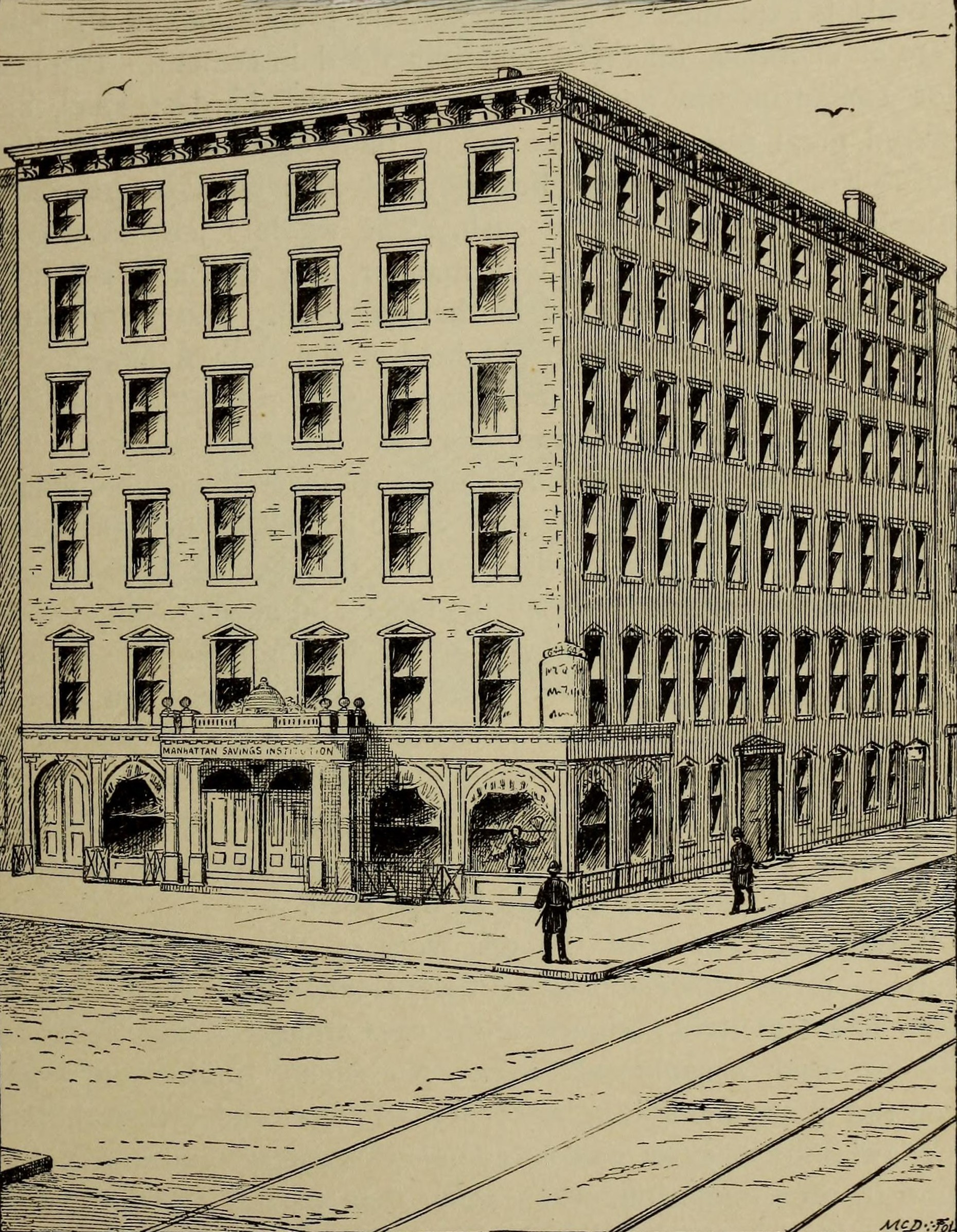
The Manhattan Bank Building at the time of its robbery

The Manhattan Savings Institution was a bank and depository located in the Manhattan Bank Building, on the northeast corner of Broadway and Bleecker Street in Manhattan, New York City. The robbery of the bank was formulated by Leslie three years prior to 1878, and planned over those three years. The planning initially involved at least Leslie, Draper, Irving, Leary, Porter, and Yost. Leslie surveyed the bank multiple times. A replica of the bank was constructed in one of Mandelbaum's warehouses in Brooklyn, where he rehearsed the robbery with his gang. Leslie drew architectural plans of the interior and exterior of the bank, and became in contact with Edward Schell, who Leslie knew from his time in high society. He also located and bribed a vault maker, and learned how to duplicate the bank's safe's combination lock. Using his contacts with the bank's president, Leslie got his associate Patrick Shevlin hired as a bank guard. Shevlin would let Leslie into the bank after hours during the planning. The gang also bribed a local police officer, John Nugent.

=== Leslie's plans to switch gangs ===
After what happened in Maine, Leslie stayed away from the gang except when planning the Institution robbery in Mandelbaum's warehouse. Leslie's nerves led him to the plan to pull off the Institution robbery by himself, which would mean double-crossing the gang and Mandelbaum. He decided to soon contact John "Traveling Mike" Grady, Mandelbaum's biggest rival. He would give Grady a percentage of the stolen profits. On March 15, Leslie convinced the gang to hold off on the robbery until the spring, when there would be more money and securities locked in the vault. In actuality, Leslie planned to use the time to rob the bank with another gang that Grady provided him, not with Draper, Irving, Leary, Porter, or Yost.

Leslie sold off his furniture and books from his home in New York. Over late March and early April, he never stayed in the same location for longer than two nights. He finally settled at a cottage at 861 Greene Avenue in Brooklyn, where he went by the name George Herbert. He then contacted Grady. Grady gave Leslie one of his top men as a bodyguard, Johnny Walsh. Walsh had been to prison 100 times, was suspected of 20 murders, and was "deadly with both a knife and his bare hands." In late April, Leslie went back to Philadelphia to be with Molly. Leslie told Molly he would retire from the revenue service (his story to avoid mentioning his criminal career), because he had made dangerous enemies. His wife told him to contact the police or Pinkertons; Leslie said he had contacted the Pinkertons and that they gave him a bodyguard. He told her that he had one last thing to attend to in New York, and that he would return in late May. Leslie planned to take the money from the robbery, and move out west with Molly. It was the last time that Molly saw him. Leslie returned from Philadelphia in late May, and went about his business as normal at his Greene Avenue cottage, with Walsh by his side. Mandelbaum pressured Leslie for a date for the robbery, but he kept stalling.

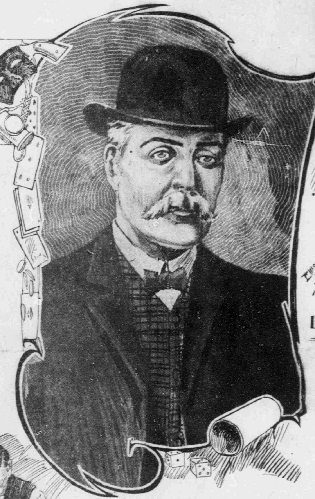
Thomas "Shang" Draper, Leslie's associate who discovered Leslie was having an affair with his wife, Babe

Mandelbaum failed to make things calm within the gang. She told the gang, excluding Leslie, that they should take back their threats towards him and make amends, because Leslie would not talk with the police. Draper and Irving were unconvinced. Draper was personally stunted by rumors of Leslie's affair with his wife, Babe. At some point, Draper had found a camel-hair shawl in Babe's possession, and went to the dry-goods store listed on the shawl's label. The owner of the store said Babe and a very handsome gentleman came into the store, and that Babe kissed him many times. He described the gentleman's pearl tie pin, and that Babe was carrying a pistol, double-barreled and pearl-handled. Draper knew Leslie owned both items. When Leslie visited Babe in a hotel room, her face was bruised, which she said was from being beaten by Draper, and that it was not the first time he done so. Leslie was enraged, and gave her the aforementioned pistol to protect herself.

== Disappearance and murder ==
On the night of May 29, 1878, Leslie stopped in at Murphy's Saloon in Brooklyn. Someone in the saloon delivered Leslie an envelope. Inside was a letter containing the handwriting of Babe. She said Draper had found out about the affair Leslie had been having with Babe, and that he should leave the city with her before Shang caught him. She said she would be waiting at her house on Halsey Street. Leslie tore up the note, and asked Johnny Walsh to hail him a cab. He told Walsh not to follow him, and that he would be safe. Leslie told the cab driver to go to Halsey Street, and Walsh watched him go.

On June 4, the body of Leslie, 41, was found in Westchester County, New York, at the foot of a place hoboes frequently used as a campsite, known colloquially as the "Tramp's Rock" in Mott's Woods, on the edge of farmland belonging to noted surgeon Alexander B. Mott, three miles to the northeast of Yonkers. The body was discovered just off of Palmer Avenue, most likely located in the modern neighborhood of Bronxville in the town of Eastchester. Leslie had been shot once in the head and once in the heart. Resting on his body was a double-barreled pistol, which was later identified as the murder weapon. It was Leslie's gun that he had given Babe Draper to protect herself with. There was no identification found on the body, and his wallet, rings, and jewelry were taken. There were no bloodstains on his body, and his clothing had been meticulously placed. It's suggested that he was murdered at another location, and then transported to Tramp's Rock while hidden in a wagon's hay. The police interviewed a witness who saw a carriage around Tramp's Rock at the time Leslie was assumed to be killed. The witness saw something sticking out of a pile of hay. Mandelbaum identified his body, and paid for his funeral at Cypress Hills Cemetery. He was buried in a $10 pauper's grave. Attending the funeral were Draper, Grady, Irving, Porter, Walsh, Yost, Thomas Brynes, and several Pinkerton agents. Molly fainted and was carried out from the service.

Many sources erroneously state Leslie died in 1884.

=== Investigation ===
The police theorized that Leslie was killed by members of his gang over the Dexter incident. During the investigation, they found out about the saloon fight, and identified Draper, Irving, and Leary, as the ones that had quarrels with Leslie, and police brought them in for questioning. One of the men besides Draper mentioned Draper's jealousy of Leslie's relationship with Babe. Draper told the police the notion was absurd, and that he and Leslie had always been best friends. They asked him about how Leslie had bought the shawl for Babe with her, and Draper challenged them to "prove it"; Draper threatened the owner and his family to keep him from talking. Based on anonymous tip probably provided by Walsh, police learned about the Murphy's Saloon letter, theorized he was being lured to his murder scene, and that Leslie had left expecting to see the woman in the letter. They questioned the cab driver at the saloon and found he had dropped Leslie off at Halsey Street, indicating the woman was Babe. They concluded Leslie had been murdered either in or near Draper's home on Halsey Street, and that the body was then taken to Mott's Woods, and theorized Babe had been forced to write the letter. No one was ever charged for his murder. The gang then continued planning the robbery without him.

== Legacy ==
The Institution robbery would be one of the largest bank robberies in American history. Its investigation led authorities to finding out about Leslie's criminal career.

Leslie was described in the book The Gangs of New York.

== See also ==
- List of bank robbers and robberies
- List of unsolved murders

== Sources ==
- "A WESTCHESTER MYSTERY.; WAS IT A MURDER? THE MYSTERY SURROUNDING THE DISCOVERY OF AN UNKNOWN DEAD MAN IN A COPSE OF BRUSH NEAR YONKERS PARTICULARS OF THE CASE" (PDF).
- Asbury, Herbert. Gangs of New York. Published in 1927.
- Conway, J. North (2009). King of Heists: The Sensational Bank Robbery of 1878 That Shocked America. The Lyons Pesss. ISBN 978-1-59921-538-9.
- Lardner, James; Reppetto, Thomas (2000). NYPD : a city and its police (1. ed.). New York: Holt. ISBN 9780805055788.
- Manaugh, Geoff (2015). Burglar's guide to the city. New York: Farrar, Straus & Giroux. ISBN 9780374117269.
- "THE WESTCHESTER MURDER; IDENTIFICATION OF THE BODY. THE POLICE SAY HE WAS A BURGLAR A WOMAN IN THE CASE" (PDF).
- Pinkerton, Allan. Professional thieves and the detective: with a sketch by the author how he became a detective etc. Repr. of the 1881 version.
- Walling, George Washington (1972) [1887]. Recollections of a New York chief of police. New York: Caxton Book Concern Limited. ISBN 0-87585-133-9.
