= Fredericka Mandelbaum =

German-born American criminal fence (1825–1894)

Fredericka "Marm" Mandelbaum
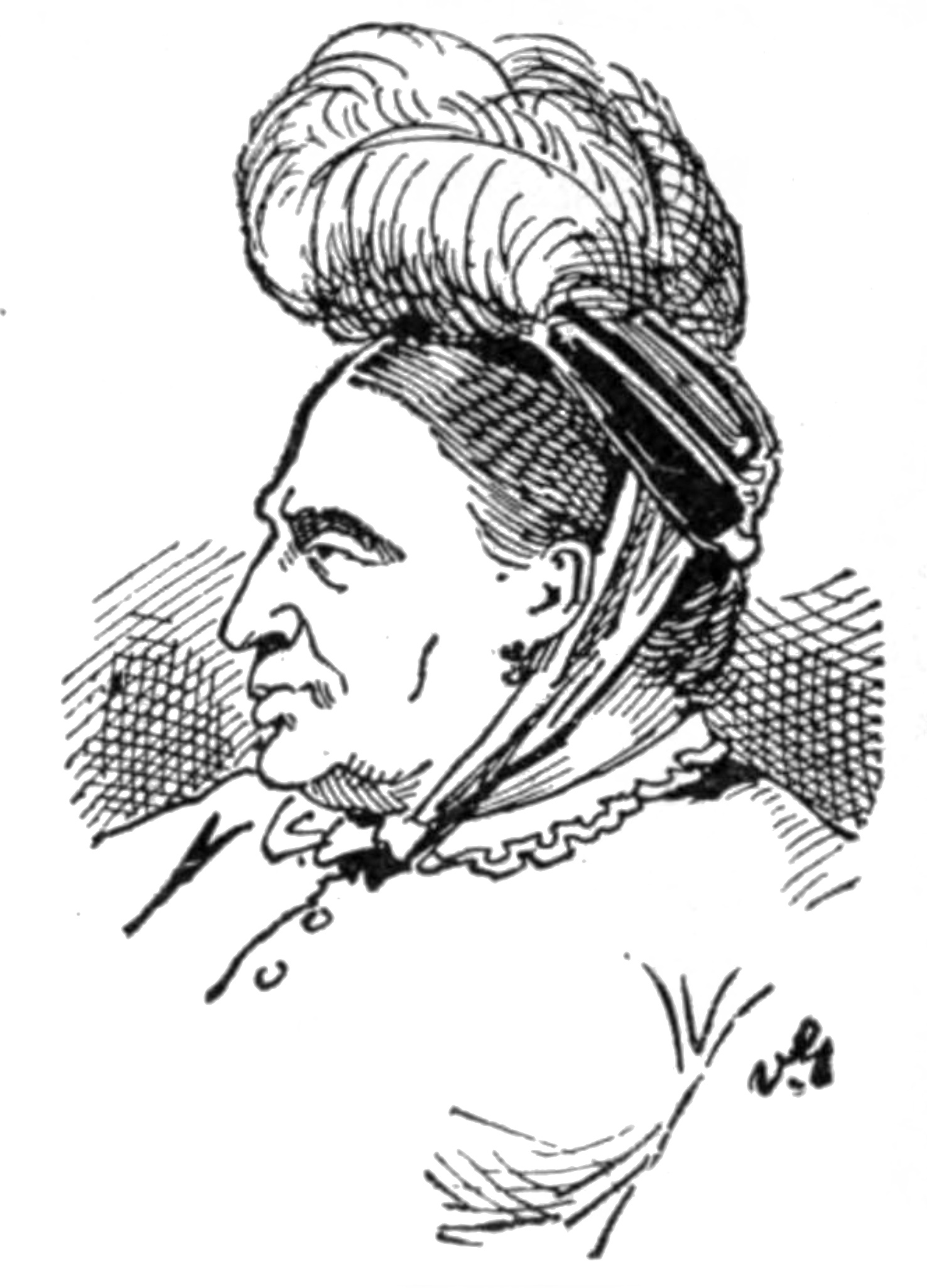
- Born: Fredericka Weisner; March 25, 1825; Kassel, Electorate of Hesse
- Died: February 26, 1894 (aged 68); Hamilton, Ontario, Canada
- Other name: Fredericka Mandlebaum
- Occupation: Criminal
- Known for: Criminal fence and underworld figure in New York City during the mid-to late 19th century
- Spouse: Wolfe Mandelbaum

Fredericka "Marm" Mandelbaum (March 25, 1825 – February 26, 1894) operated as a criminal fence to many of the street gangs and criminals of New York's underworld, handling between $1–5 million in stolen goods between 1862 and 1884. Like her principal rival John D. Grady and the Grady Gang, she also became a matriarch to the criminal elements of the city and was involved in financing and organizing numerous burglaries and other criminal operations throughout the post-American Civil War era. With George Leonidas Leslie, she was involved in the 1869 Ocean National Bank robbery and the 1878 Manhattan Savings Institution robbery.

== Life and career ==
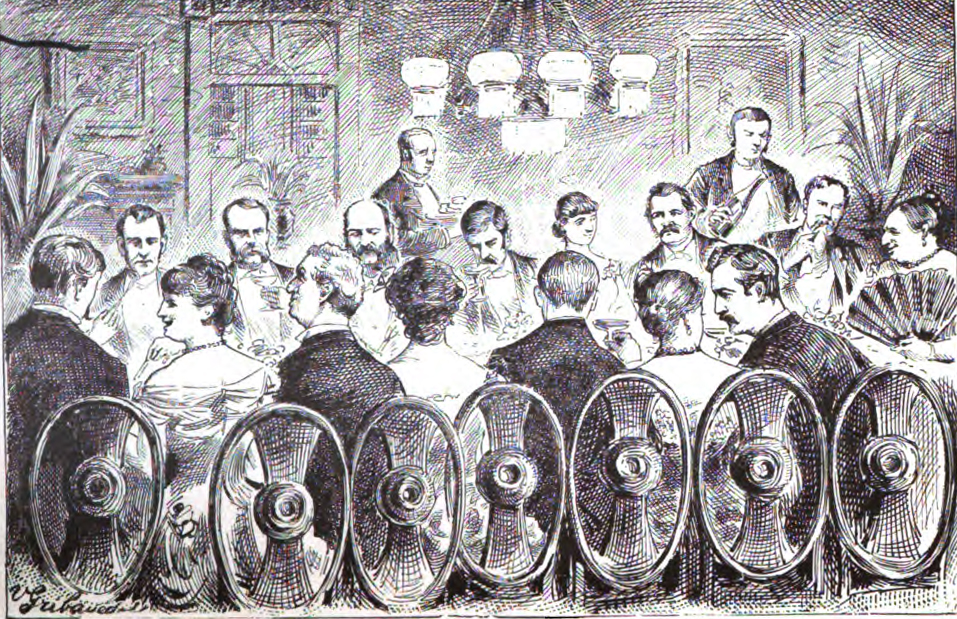
A typical dinner party hosted by Mandelbaum and her "inner circle".

Mandelbaum was born Friederike Weisner in Kassel, a city in modern-day Germany. Not much is known of her early life, other than that her family was Jewish. She married Wolfe Mandelbaum in 1848; they worked as itinerant peddlers in Germany before emigrating to the United States in 1850.

When the family arrived in New York, they began a series of small businesses, taking in goods collected by scavengers and reselling them. The pair purchased a dry goods store on Clinton Street, but by 1854, the business was operating as a front for the Mandelbaums' criminal operations (she would later need to store goods in two large warehouses in the city). Mandelbaum began financing thieves and burglars and was involved in planning some of the biggest thefts in the city's history, including the Ocean National Bank. Expanding her operations, she controlled several gangs of blackmailers and confidence men as well as a school, known as Marm's Grand Street School, to recruit and teach younger criminals how to pickpocket. She was also a top competitor to the Grady Gang.

According to police inspector Thomas Byrnes in his 1886 book Professional Criminals of America, Mandelbaum’s known associates included "burglar" Michael Kurtz, "pickpocket" Abraham Greenthall, "pickpocket, sneak, and shoplifter" Mary Hollbrook, and "Pickpocket and Blackmailer" Sophie Levy (or Lyons), often called Mandelbaum’s special protégé. Mandelbaum was reputedly loyal to her criminal associates. Chief of Police George W. Walling wrote, “She attained a reputation as a business woman whose honesty in criminal matters was absolute,” while The New York Times obituary noted: "her success was in a great measure due to her friendship for and her loyalty to the thieves with whom she did business. She never betrayed her clients, and when they got into trouble she procured bail for them and befriended them to the extent of her power". For 30 years, she operated her business with impunity, as Walling highlighted her widespread influence and ingenuity in assisting criminals. Much of what is known about Mandelbaum comes from Walling’s 1887 Recollections of a New York Chief of Police and Sophie Lyons' 1913 memoir Why Crime Does Not Pay, which details Mandelbaum’s operations, including a hidden dumbwaiter for stolen goods. She was known for meticulously bribing and paying off police, local politicians, and judges.

Mandelbaum also became one of New York's most prominent hostesses of New York's high society, as well as the underworld, regularly associating with some of the most well-known criminals of the day including Queen Liz, Big Mary, "Black" Lena Kleinschmidt, Adam Worth, Sophie Lyons, and George Leonidas Leslie as well as judges and police officials.

Mandelbaum’s preferred items were bolts of silk and diamonds, which she could acquire inexpensively and sell at a significant profit. However, she accepted anything of value. “Following the Great Chicago Fire, someone showed up at her haberdashery shop with a herd of goats they’d stolen during the fire, and she took them,” says J. North Conway, author of Queen of Thieves: The True Story of 'Marm' Mandelbaum and Her Gangs of New York.

Mandelbaum's notoriety frequently placed her in the public eye. Her increasing infamy led to numerous mentions and quotes in newspapers, and her ostentatious display of wealth made her a notable and recognizable character. She was 6 feet tall and said to weigh between 200 and 300 pounds, giving her an imposing physical presence. Mandelbaum often adorned herself with $40,000 worth of jewels and dressed in luxurious materials such as silk, ostrich feathers, and sealskin, making her "hard to miss".

== Arrest ==
In 1884, New York City's new District Attorney Peter B. Olney, described by The New York Times as “an eccentric person who honestly means to do his duty and enforce the laws,” decided to act against Mandelbaum. Instead of relying on the city’s police force, which Mandelbaum had reportedly been bribing for decades, he hired the Pinkerton Detective Agency, led by Robert A. Pinkerton, to conduct a sting operation.

Pinkerton detective Gustav Frank, using the pseudonym Stein, infiltrated her inner circle. He eventually purchased "marked" silks from her. Her arrest in July and subsequent case received extensive coverage from major New York newspapers, intrigued by the downfall of such a notorious criminal. The use of Pinkerton detectives caused some friction between the district attorney’s office and the city’s police inspector.

At the time of her arrest, Mandelbaum had attorneys William F. Howe and Abraham Hummel on retainer for $5,000 a year. Howe and Hummel argued for her innocence and attempted to discredit Gustav Frank, implying he was a criminal. Bail was set at $10,000 ($2,000 for each of five charges). Despite round-the-clock surveillance by Pinkerton detectives, Mandelbaum failed to appear in court on December 4. The New York Times described the scene: “District Attorney Olney sat, sternly imposing…Mr. Howe was plumply serene and ponderously gracious… ‘Frederika Mandelbaum!’…The words seemed to float over the heads of the merchants and lose themselves. There was no answer. Dead silence reigned…Then a little sound of something like disappointment was heard in the court, and Lawyer Howe rose to his feet. ‘The defendants are not here, your Honor.’”

== Later life and death ==
The next day, the New York press located Mandelbaum in Canada. At the time there was no extradition treaty between Canada and the United States, so she lived out her remaining years there, despite expressing regret over leaving New York, once telling a reporter, “I am sorry that I ever left New-York, I should have faced the music.”

Mandelbaum died in 1894. Her death generated another wave of headlines, with some reports suggesting that she was not actually deceased and that her coffin contained stones. Other sources reported that several pockets were picked at the cemetery.

== Public image ==
Mandelbaum was nicknamed in the New York press as "Mother" Mandelbaum. The origins of this nickname are speculative. The press may have found irony in calling a woman, often described with antisemitic overtones as “a German Jewess with large, coarse features, almost masculine in appearance, restless black eyes, and a dark, florid complexion,” "Mother." Other explanations include her protective nature towards criminals and her role as a devoted mother of four. Mandelbaum has been described as "a kind of folk anti-hero, winning the grudging admiration of her foes".

The Brooklyn Daily Eagle described Mandelbaum, possibly with a hint of irony, as "a most respectable and philanthropic receiver of stolen goods in New York."

== Biographies ==
Mandelbaum is the subject of J. North Conway's 2014 book Queen of Thieves: The True Story of “Marm” Mandelbaum and Her Gangs of New York, as well as Margalit Fox's book The Talented Mrs. Mandelbaum: The Rise and Fall of an American Organized-Crime Boss, published in 2024.

== Sources ==
- Asbury, Herbert. The Gangs of New York. New York: Alfred A. Knopf, 1927. ISBN 978-1-56025-275-7
- Sifakis, Carl. The Encyclopedia of American Crime. New York: Facts on File Inc., 2001. ISBN 978-0-8160-4040-7
- Phillips, Charles and Alan Axelrod. Cops, Crooks, and Criminologists: An International Biographical Dictionary of Law Enforcement, Updated Edition. New York: Checkmark Books, 2000. ISBN 978-0-8160-3016-3
