= Ned Lyons =

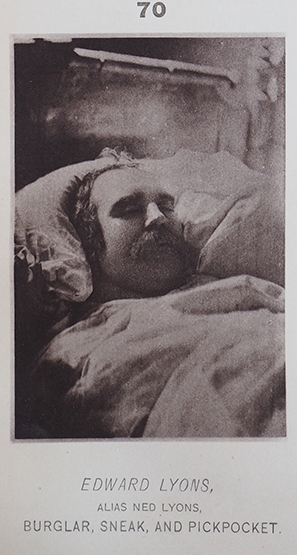
- Lyons recuperating in a hospital after being shot by police
- Born: Edward Lyons; July 15, 1839; Ireland
- Died: May 22, 1907; Manhattan, New York, US
- Other names: Robert E. Hapgood, Edward T. Sanman, George Jackson and George F. Lenning
- Occupation: Criminal
- Known for: New York burglar, bank robber and underworld figure
- Spouse: Sophie Lyons (wife)
- Children: 2 sons, 4 daughters

Edward Lyons was a New York City gangster in the 19th century. Born in Ireland July 15, 1839, he immigrated to America as a child and settled in Lowell, Massachusetts. A burglar and bank robber, he learned his criminal trade in New York City. He was sentenced to Sing Sing Prison, from which he escaped in 1872 with his wife, Sophie Lyons. After serving multiple prison terms he became a notorious hustler and conman.

Ned learned to understand how people think and react, and although impaired by extreme near-sightedness, he was capable of quickly identifying liars, earning himself a high powered position among the gangs of New York. Physically, he had a strikingly large head.
