= Howe and Hummel =

Nineteenth century New York City law firm

Howe and Hummel was a New York City law firm, celebrated in the latter half of the nineteenth century and principally renowned for its active involvement in the world of crime and corruption.

== The partners ==
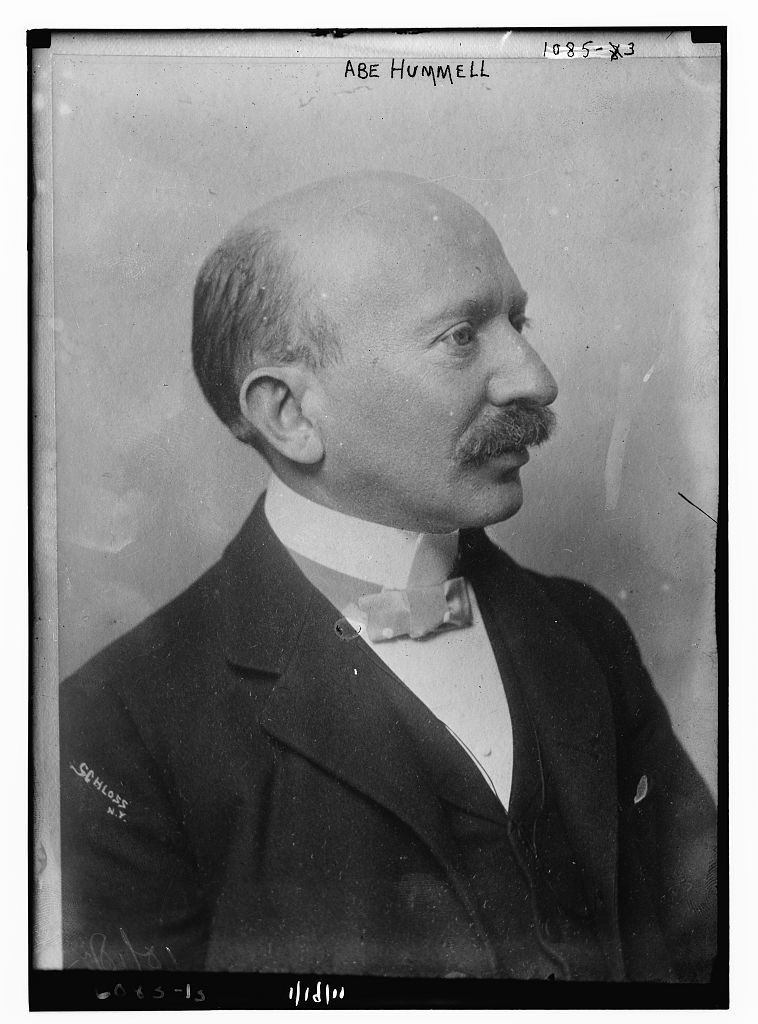
Abe Hummel

The senior partner in the firm was William F. Howe (1828 – September 2, 1902), a corpulent UK-born and later naturalized American trial lawyer who had served 18 months in jail in Britain for false representation, and who was strongly suspected of possessing a more extensive criminal background. Prosecuted in 1874 by a pair of white slavers, William and Adelaide Beaumont, "who maintained that they had in some fashion been cheated by the partners",

Howe's background was gone into at some length by the Beaumonts' attorney, Thomas Dunphy. Howe was asked by Dunphy to tell the jury why he had left England. Howe's lawyer, ex-mayor A. Oakey Hall, objected on the ground that the question was immaterial. The objection was sustained. Howe was also asked if his license to practice medicine in England had been revoked. Hall again objected and was again sustained. The question may or may not have been material, but it seems unlikely that it would have been asked at all without some foundation ... Some other questions of interest were put to Howe at the Beaumont trial. He was asked if he was the same person as the William Frederick Howe wanted for murder in England. He said that he was not. He was asked if he was the same person as the William Frederick Howe convicted of forgery in Brooklyn a few years earlier. He denied that he was that person.

In 1869, Howe made a partner of Abraham Hummel (July 27, 1850 – January 21, 1926), his former clerk and physical opposite, a runtish, rake-thin genius renowned for his ability to spot loopholes in the law.

== Criminal and civil practice ==
Howe handled most of the firm's criminal work, participating in more than 600 murder trials in the course of his fifty-year career and winning a large but unstated proportion of them. He was noted for his extravagant dress, favoring bright waistcoats and large jeweled rings—although he steadily dressed down as a capital trial progressed, invariably ending it in a funereal suit and black tie. He had a markedly florid rhetorical style, on one occasion delivering an entire summing-up, two hours, while on his knees before the jury box. One of his most remarked upon talents was an apparent ability to weep at will, although legal historian Sadakat Kadri notes that his frequent opponent Francis L. Wellman "suspected that he used an onion-scented handkerchief to get in the mood". The less extrovert but more intelligent Hummel specialized in civil law and ran the firm's thriving blackmail racket, representing chorus girls and thwarted lovers, threatening married men with exposure and well-off young bachelors with suits for breach of promise of marriage.

At its peak, operating from offices just across the road from NYPD headquarters on Centre Street, Howe and Hummel received fat retainers from a significant proportion of the criminals, brothel-keepers, and abortionists of New York. All 74 madams rounded up during a purity drive in 1884 named Howe and Hummel as their counsel, and at one time the firm represented 23 out of the 25 prisoners awaiting trial for murder in the city's Tombs prison and had an undeclared interest in the twenty-fourth.

Bill Howe's persuasive abilities were the stuff of legend. Perhaps his most notable achievement was to get a client, Ella Nelson, acquitted on a charge of willful murder. Howe admitted that the girl had been armed with a revolver, but successfully persuaded a jury that her trigger finger had accidentally slipped not just once, but four times in the course of an argument with her married lover.

Another of Howe's most spectacular defenses, according to the New York Tribune of 2 September 1902:

was his sudden turn in the trial of Edward Unger, who confessed that he had killed a lodger, cut up the body, thrown part in the East River, and sent the rest in a box to Baltimore. Mr Howe stupefied the courtroom by dramatically denying that Unger had done any of those things. He increased the surprise by asserting that Unger's little seven-year-old girl, at that moment on her father's knee, had done them. After tapping thus a wellspring of astonishment, Mr Howe turned the emotion dextrously into profound sympathy by explaining that it was the thought of the little girl which prompted Unger to conceal a deed done in the heat of passion. The jury convicted the confessed murderer of manslaughter only.

One of Howe's most notorious cases, however, may have been that of John Dolan, convicted in the murder of merchant James H. Noe. Despite a desperate legal battle to save his life, Dolan went to the gallows on April 21, 1875. New York Times coverage of the case, which riveted New York for several months, identifies one William F. Howe as Dolan's attorney. In a noticeable omission, it does not mention Dolan in its obituary for Howe.

Among Abe Hummel's most celebrated achievements was the discovery of an error in procedure that led to the release of 240 of the 300 prisoners on Blackwell's Island in a single day. On another occasion, the partners invoked a technicality that, had it been allowed, would have set free every prisoner awaiting trial, or recently convicted, of first degree murder in the State of New York, and made it impossible for the authorities to obtain further capital convictions for murder for a period of several months.

== Collapse of the firm ==
The final collapse of the firm came in 1907, five years after Howe's death, when Hummel was convicted in New York of suborning perjury, disbarred, and sentenced to a year in jail. After his release, Hummel left the United States and lived chiefly in Paris.

Howe and Hummel kept no records (the partners reportedly met at the end of each day and emptied their respective pockets onto the table and evenly divided the total pile), actively courted publicity (despite bar rules against lawyers advertising (which did not begin to be relaxed until the late 1960s), they maintained a full-sized billboard atop their offices), and were much discussed in their day among the members of the legal profession. As such, many of the stories told about them have the aura of tall tales. Nevertheless, their decades of effective practice suggest that the partners were among the most effective and innovative attorneys to practice in the United States during the nineteenth century.

Although nobody can deny a strong element of "sharp practice", including using suspect surprise witnesses in some trials, or suppressing adverse witness testimony by sending them out of state, all expenses paid, until the trial was over, there was genuine talent in the team, especially in the abilities of William Howe in court. A recent study of the 1897 murder of Willie Guldensuppe, and the 1898 trial of his killer Martin Thorne, gives clear proof of Howe's mastery of cross-examination. At the first trial of Thorne, his co-conspirator, Mrs. Augusta Nack, testified against Thorne. Howe's simple and direct cross-examination ripped her testimony apart on the stand, which led to the prosecution deciding not to use her again in a retrial. Nonetheless, even with Howe's efforts and skill, in the second trial Thorne was convicted and sentenced to be executed. Despite Howe's courtroom skills and Hummel's mastery of legal intricacies, it was ultimately the (mis)use of their talents that ultimately brought down the firm.

== General bibliography ==
=== Books ===
- Collins, Paul (2011). The Murder of the Century: The Gilded Age Crime that Scandalized a City & Sparked the Tabloid Wars. New York: Crown Publishers.
- Kadri, Sadakat (2005). The Trial: A History, from Socrates to O.J. Simpson. New York: Random House.
- Morton, James (2001). Gangland: The Lawyers. London: Virgin.
- Murphy, Cait (2011). Scoundrels in Law: The Trials of Howe and Hummel, Lawyers to the Gangsters, Cops, Starlets, and Rakes Who Made the Gilded Age. New York: Harper.
- Rovere, Richard H. (1948). Howe and Hummel: Their True and Scandalous History. London: Michael Joseph.
- Train, Arthur (1908). True Stories of Crime From the District Attorney's Office. New York: Charles Scribner's Sons.
- Wellman, Francis L. (1924). Gentlemen of the Jury. New York: Macmillan.

=== Articles ===
- "William F. Howe, Dean of Criminal Bar, Dead". The New York Times September 3, 1902, p. 9.
- "Decadence of New York's Criminal Bar". The New York Times, September 7, 1902, p. 34.
- [Accounts of Ella Nelson trial]. New York Herald, June 19, 1891, p. 3 & June 20, p. 4.
