= Johnny Dolan =

American murderer and gang leader

- Born: John Dolan c. 1849
- Died: April 21, 1876 (age 26); New York City, New York
- Other name: "Dandy" Johnny Dolan
- Status: Deceased
- Conviction: Murder
- Penalty: Death by hanging (through strangulation)

"Dandy" Johnny Dolan (c. 1849 – April 21, 1876) was a New York City murderer and reputed leader of the Whyos street gang.

== Life ==
A biography of Dolan published by The New York Times in 1876 contains many details about Dolan's criminal history. It states that he was a petty thief and burglar who, before his final arrest on a murder charge, served two terms in Blackwell's Island Penitentiary for larceny, one of four and the other of six months, as well as a 2 1/2-year term in the State Prison at Sing Sing for burglary. A separate Times report describes him as "well known in the various low saloons on the Bowery as a man of desperate character." It says that he once tried to kill a man in a saloon and intended to use a heavy sling shot to do it.

According to Herbert Asbury's book The Gangs of New York, Dolan led the Whyos during its glory years of the post-Civil War era. Asbury wrote that Dolan was known as a particularly inventive criminal, who perfected a variety of devices widely used for assault and murder throughout the underworld. According to Asbury, Dolan designed a copper eye gouger to be worn on the thumb and used it both in criminal activities and in battles with other gangs. Dolan himself allegedly owned a personally designed pair of boots with sections of a sharp axe blade embedded in the soles, which he used to stomp a downed victim.

== Final crime ==
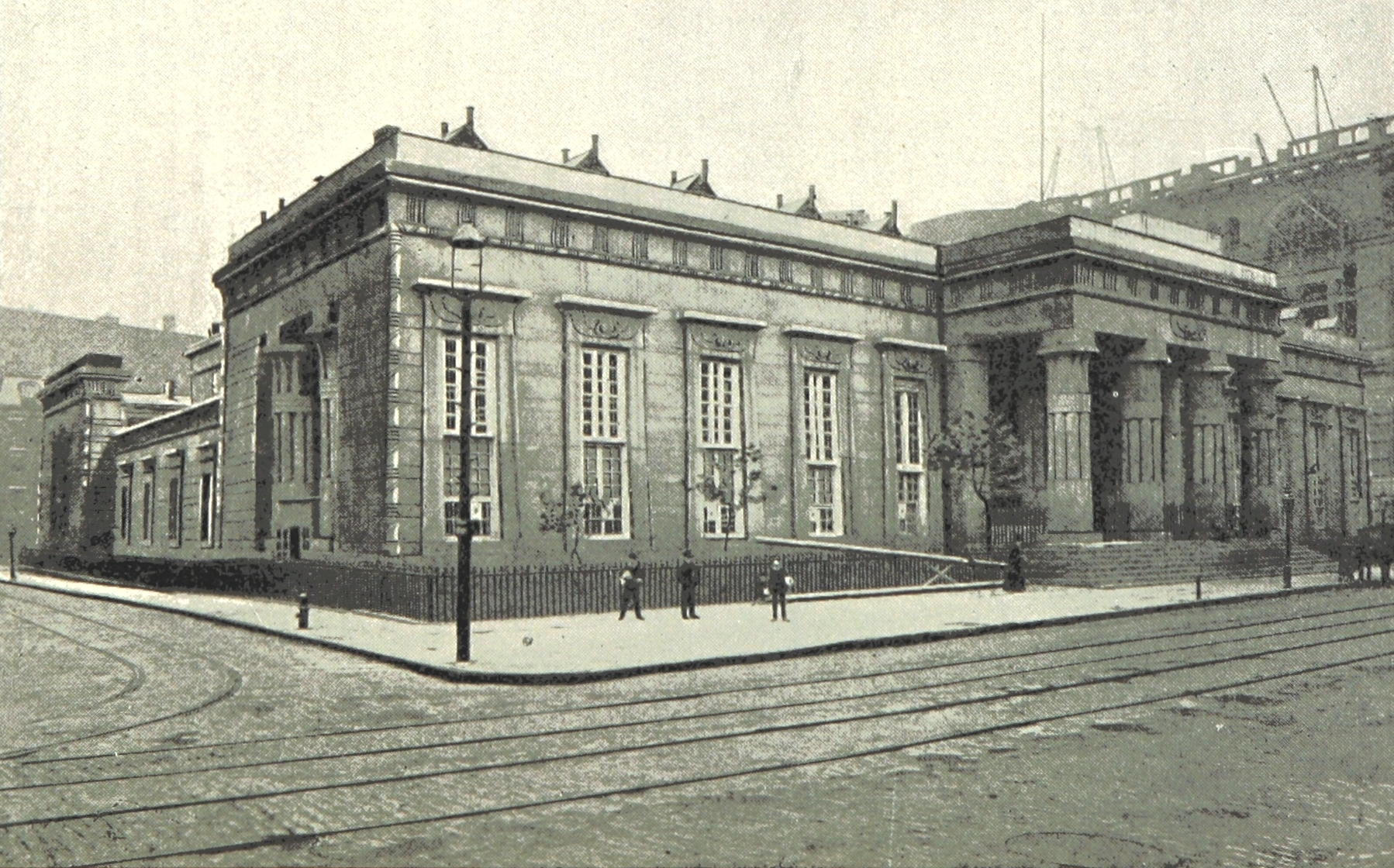
The Tombs

Dolan died for the murder of merchant James H. Noe, 59. On the morning of August 22, 1875, Noe, the owner of a Greenwich Street brush factory, checked the security of his business. He surprised a burglar who was attempting to enter through the scuttle in the roof and engaged in a fatal battle with him.

According to Asbury, Dolan attacked Noe with eye gougers before beating him to death with an iron bar. According to the Times, the burglar struck Noe on the head with a rattan cane, then grabbed an iron tube ("paint-iron") and repeatedly hit Noe over the head with it. After Noe collapsed, the burglar was even "considerate enough to provide a pillow for the bleeding, mangled head," using rags found on the floor, the Times wrote. The burglar then bound and gagged Noe, and robbed him of several items, including a watch and chain. Noe survived several days before dying. Of damage to the eyes, a post-mortem report mentions "a lacerated wound" on the upper lid of the left eye and a "fissure of the frontal bone." Official cause of death was meningitis caused by the injuries.

Still conscious when found, Noe could describe his attacker. The official police description was of a man 24–30 years of age, with light complexion and light hair cut short; and clean shaven, except for small dark side whiskers, 5'5"-6' tall; of a stout, fleshy build; full, fat face; supposedly of Irish parentage. The Times describes Dolan as about 26, 5'7 1/2" tall, dark complexioned, "with a brutal face and that singular and massive jaw which led to his detection." At the time of his arrest, some six weeks after the assault, Dolan had a mustache but no side whiskers.

According to underworld lore, Dolan later presented his victim's gouged eyes before other members of the Whyos and was apprehended after he was connected to the stolen watch and chain and the finding of a specialized cane hidden at the crime scene. The cane, thought to have been used to bludgeon Noe, had a metal handle carved into the likeness of a monkey.

Times reports make no mention of gouged eyes or Whyos, but do say that Dolan was arrested after pawning a watch that belonged to Noe. The pawnbroker initially declined to identify Dolan, but then did so later, apparently basing his recollection on the shape of Dolan's jaw. Witnesses also identified the cane as belonging to Dolan. For his part, Dolan said he was at his mother's house, drunk, at the time of the murder. He said someone had given him the watch to pawn, a man who was never found. Dolan said his cane had a silver helmet (of "real silver") not a monkey head, on it. (This claim was actually backed by one of the witnesses who had said the assault cane was Dolan's.) The third bit of circumstantial evidence was a handkerchief found soaked with blood used to gag Noe. A witness, subjected to intense and repeated police interrogation, identified the handkerchief as belonging to Dolan, who denied that the cloth was his.

== Trial and death ==
Dolan was tried and found guilty of murder in the first degree. Represented by attorney William F. Howe, Dolan made lengthy efforts to prevent the sentence being carried out and gained several stays of execution. However, he eventually failed. When sentenced to death for the second time, Dolan rose, told the judge, "I never lifted my hand against any man ... I never shed human blood," and burst into tears.

He was hanged on April 21, 1876, on a cold, damp evening, at the Tombs Prison in New York City. The official cause of death was strangulation. His remains were buried at Calvary Cemetery. He was 26. He was survived by a wife, a mother and little sister.

== In popular culture ==
Stories featuring Johnny Dolan and the Whyos Gang were published in comic books Real Clue Crime Stories in 1947.

== See also ==
- Capital punishment in New York (state)
- Capital punishment in the United States
- List of people executed in New York
