= Billy Burke (criminal) =

19th century criminal (1858–1919)

- Born: William James Burke; 1858; Proctor, Massachusetts
- Died: 1919 (aged 60–61); Detroit, Michigan, US
- Other names: Billy the Kid, Flash Billy, Frank Lacrose and Frank Smith
- Occupation: Criminal
- Known for: sneak thief, bank robber and underworld figure
- Spouse: Sophie Lyons (wife)

William "Billy the Kid" Burke was a gangster in the 19th century. Burke was born to an Irish-American family in Massachusetts on March 18, 1858. By 1880 his mother had been widowed and the family had moved to Chicago and Burke had become a professional criminal. His brother, John “Fat Man” Burke, claimed he was a plumber but he also worked as a professional criminal. Two of Burke's younger brothers held positions in the telegraph office. This proved useful to him later when he needed access to messages sent by private detectives, such as the Pinkertons.

Burke met Sophie Lyons and they became criminal partners in the early 1880s. Lyons was an adept pickpocket and Burke's specialty was theft by subterfuge, or sneak thievery. (A sneak thief worked by distracting his victims in order to rob them without using violence.)

Burke was polite and well-dressed, which put his victims at ease. Burke and Lyons were arrested for attempted bank robbery in Mt. Sterling, Kentucky in 1892. Lyons was not convicted and released, however Burke was convicted. He served his sentence in the Kentucky State Reformatory.

Burke and Lyons lived together for years before getting married in 1910. He continued to work as a sneak thief in the United States and in Europe. He died of a stroke on October 25, 1919, in Detroit.
