= John D. Grady =

American criminal

- Born: Unknown
- Died: September 30, 1880; New York, NY, U.S.
- Occupations: diamond broker, gangster
- Status: deceased

John D. "Traveling Mike" Grady (died September 30, 1880) was a New York criminal and, as leader of the Grady Gang, financed and organized many of the major burglaries of the 19th century. One of the most prominent fences in the underworld, he was a rival of Fredericka Mandelbaum.

Although a diamond broker by profession, Grady was known in New York and throughout the United States a major figure in the criminal world during the mid-to-late 19th century. He reportedly made a frequent habit of carrying a satchel which he often claimed contained valuables from watches to diamonds and jewelry which he boasted valued between $125,000-$150,000.

His body was found in his Sixth Avenue office and, although relatives believed his death to be foul play, an autopsy reported he had died of cardiac congestion related to his suffering from pneumonia during the previous months.
