= Lena Kleinschmidt =

American thief

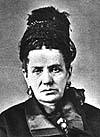
- Born: c. 1835
- Occupation: Criminal
- Known for: New York jewel thief, shoplifter and confidence woman.

"Black" Lena Kleinschmidt (c. 1835 – after 1886) was a German-born New York criminal who, as a prominent jewel thief during the late 19th century, was an associate of fence Fredericka "Marm" Mandelbaum and Adam Worth. Among others in Mandelbaum's "clique", she and con artist Sophie Lyons served as protégés early in their careers of shoplifting and pick pocketing.

She was eventually arrested after being caught with Christene "Kid Glove Rosey" Mayer attempting to steal two pieces of silk containing 108 yards with a value of $250 in 1880 from the McCreery & Co. store at the corner of 11th Street and Broadway on April 9, 1880. During their arrest, police found in their possession property recently stolen from Le Boutillier Brothers on 14th Street.

Convicted and sentenced to five years at Blackwell's Island on April 30, Kleinschmidt fled while out on a $500 bail. She was soon rearrested and returned to New York, where she was convicted after pleading guilty and sentenced to four years and nine months imprisonment along with Mayer on April 30. She was released after her sentence expired on September 30, 1883.

Lena eventually moved to Hackensack, New Jersey, and, while posing as the wealthy widow of a South American mining tycoon, became known as a local hostess giving elaborate dinner parties in the style of Mandelbaum. Although having no visible means of support during this time, twice a week she would visit New York "replenishing her coffers". Her charade ended when a guest allegedly recognized a jeweled (or emerald) ring which she had worn during one of her dinner parties which had been previously stolen.
