= William F. Howe (lawyer) =

American lawyer

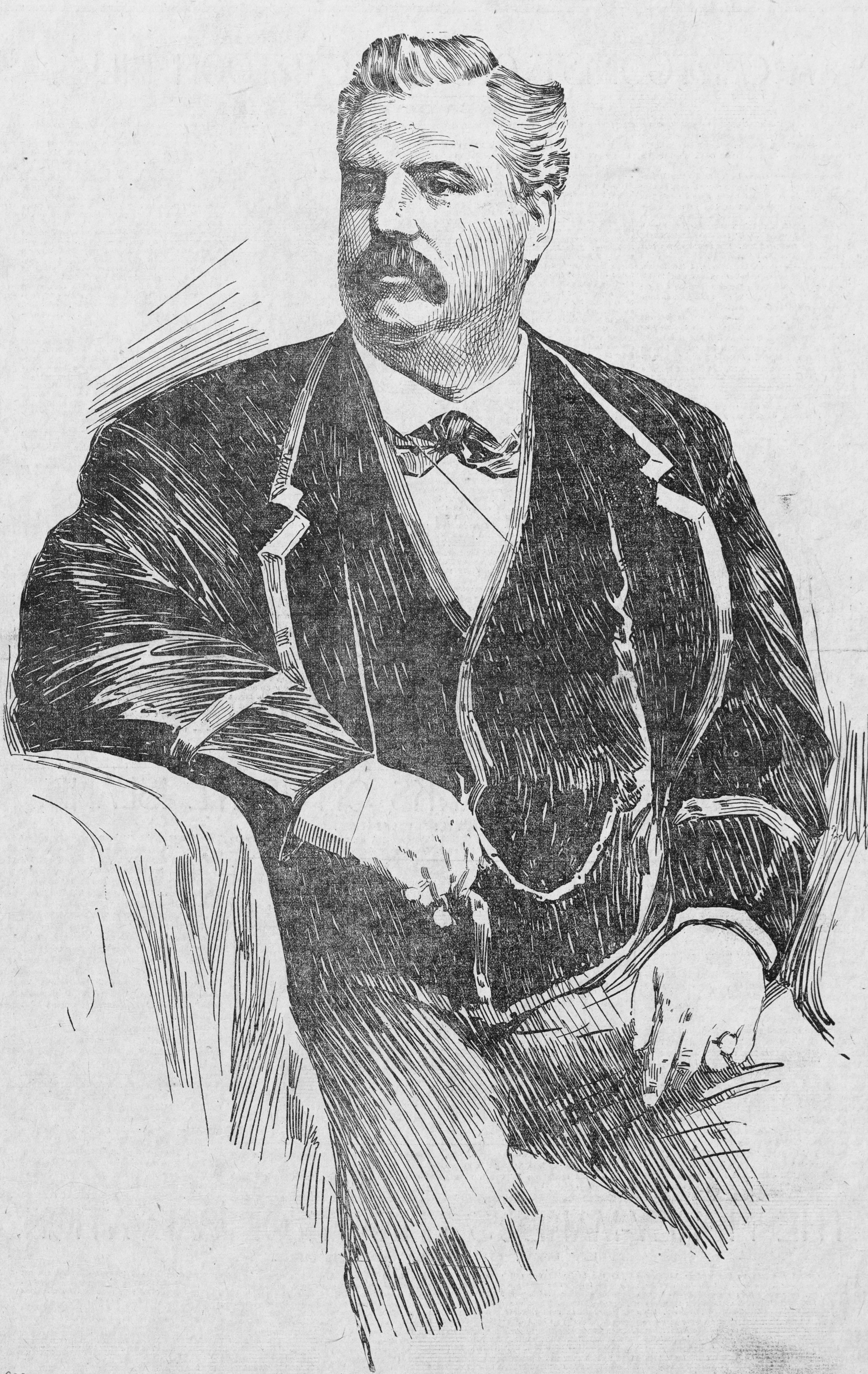
William F. Howe

William Frederick Howe (1828 – September 2, 1902) was an American trial lawyer with the New York City firm Howe and Hummel.

== Life and career ==
William Frederick Howe was born in Southwark, London, England on 20 August 1828, the eldest of three sons of working-class parents: Samuel and Mary Ann Howe. City of London records show that his early career was as a legal clerk but that in 1854 he was convicted with others at the Old Bailey for conspiracy to pervert the course of justice and served a short prison sentence. He then moved to the US and resumed his legal career, claiming to have been born in Boston, Massachusetts. He became a naturalised American on 19 September 1863 in New York where he founded Howe and Hummel with Abraham Hummel (1849-January 21, 1926). Howe handled most of the firm's criminal work, participating in more than 600 murder trials in the course of his fifty-year career and winning a large but unstated proportion of them. He was noted for his extravagant dress, favouring bright waistcoats and large jewelled rings - although he steadily dressed down as a capital trial progressed, invariably ending it in a funereal suit and black tie. He had a markedly florid rhetorical style, on one occasion delivering an entire summing-up, two hours long, while on his knees before the jury box. One of his most remarked upon talents was an apparent ability to weep at will, although legal historian Sadakat Kadri notes that his frequent opponent Francis L. Wellman "suspected that he used an onion-scented handkerchief to get in the mood". The less extrovert but more intelligent Hummel specialised in civil law and ran the firm's thriving blackmail racket, representing chorus girls and thwarted lovers, threatening married men with exposure and well-off young bachelors with suits for breach of promise of marriage.

At its peak, operating from offices just across the road from NYPD headquarters on Centre Street, Howe and Hummel received fat retainers from a significant proportion of the criminals, brothel-keepers, and abortion providers of New York. All 74 madams rounded up during a purity drive in 1884 named Howe and Hummel as their counsel, and at one time the firm represented 23 out of the 25 prisoners awaiting trial for murder in the city's Tombs prison and had an undeclared interest in the twenty-fourth.

Bill Howe's persuasive abilities were the stuff of legend. Perhaps his most notable achievement was to get a client, Ella Nelson, acquitted on a charge of wilful murder. Howe admitted that the girl had been armed with a revolver, but successfully persuaded a jury that her trigger finger had accidentally slipped not just once, but four times in the course of an argument with her married lover.

One of Howe's most notorious cases, however, may have been that of John Dolan (a.k.a. Johnny Dolan), convicted in the murder of merchant James H. Noe. Despite a desperate legal to save his life, Dolan went to the gallows on April 21, 1875. New York Times coverage of the case, which riveted New York for several months, identifies one William F. Howe as Dolan's attorney. In a noticeable omission, the Times does not mention Dolan in its obituary for Howe.

Howe and Hummel kept no records, actively courted publicity, and were much discussed in their day among the members of the legal profession. As such, many of the stories told about them have the aura of tall tales. Nevertheless, their decades of effective practise suggest that the partners were among the most effective and innovative attorneys to practice in the United States during the nineteenth century.

The final collapse of the firm came in 1907, five years after Howe's death, when Hummel was convicted in New York of suborning perjury, disbarred, and sentenced to a year in jail. After his release, Hummel left the United States and lived chiefly in Paris. Howe, who died of a heart attack in 1902, married at least three times, once in the United Kingdom and at least twice in the USA. Howe is interred at Green-Wood Cemetery in Brooklyn, New York, though his grave is unmarked. He was survived by two of his wives, one adopted daughter and several grandchildren. There is an extended family still in the UK, descended from his brother Ferdinand who he was close to for his entire life.
