= Christene Mayer =

American criminal

Kid Glove Rosey
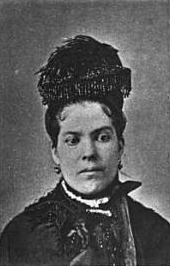
- Born: Christene Mayer c. 1847; German Confederation
- Other names: Christene Meyer; Mary Scanlon; Rosey Roder
- Occupation: Criminal
- Known for: New York thief, shoplifter and confidence woman

Christene Mayer (also spelled Meyer) or Kid Glove Rosey (born c. 1847) was a New York criminal and thief during the late 19th century; her aliases including Mary Scanlon and Rosey Roder.

Born in Germany, Christene became known as a prominent shoplifter in New York and other major cities before her arrest with "Black" Lena Kleinschmidt for stealing two pieces of silk containing 108 yards (valued at $250) from the McCreery & Co. store at the corner of 11th Street and Broadway on April 9, 1880. Recently stolen property from Le Boutillier Brothers on 14th Street was found in their possession as well as the stolen silk.

Convicted and sentenced to five years at Blackwell's Island on April 30 (Kleinschmidt, who had fled while out on bail, was soon rearrested and sentenced to four years and nine months imprisonment on the same day), her sentence eventually expired on November 30, 1883, and she was subsequently released.
