= Eliza Wallace =

Big Mary
- Other names: Eliza Gilford; Mary Anderson; Mary Rogers
- Occupation: Criminal
- Known for: New York thief, shoplifter and confidence woman

Eliza Wallace, also known as Big Mary or Boston Mary, (fl. 1863 – 1869) was an American criminal in New York during the late 19th century. Her known aliases included Eliza Gilford, Mary Anderson, and Mary Rogers. An associate of Fredericka Mandelbaum, she was a prominent thief and con artist in New York's underworld during the 1860s and 1870s.

In 1863, Wallace was arrested under the alias Mary Anderson for stealing silk from Stewart's. She was sentenced to 12 months imprisonment. She also served a two-and-a-half-year prison sentence in Sing Sing Prison for shoplifting under the name Eliza Gilford.

On June 25, 1868, she was arrested on charges of stealing 70 yards of silk estimated to be worth $210 from the Lake & McCreery store on Broadway. After posting bail, she failed to appear in court, and an arrest warrant was issued by District Attorney A. Oakey Hall on July 8. However, a search by Capt. John Jourdan of the sixth precinct failed to locate her, and she remained a fugitive for over a year before he received information that she was in Philadelphia. After gaining consent from police officials, he sent a detective named Woolridge to take her into custody on January 22, 1869.

Detective Woolridge returned with her the following day, and she was arraigned before Justice Dowling (the Court of General Sessions having adjourned shortly before his arrival).

She was also wanted by police officials in Philadelphia on between six and eight criminal charges while awaiting trial in New York.
