= Sophie Lyons =

American criminal (1848–1924)

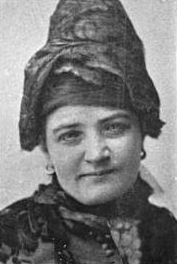
- Born: December 24, 1848; Lauben, Germany
- Died: May 8, 1924 (aged 75); Detroit, Michigan, U.S.
- Other names: Madame d'Varney; Sophia Lyons; Sophie Lyons-Burke; Mary Watson
- Occupations: Thief, shoplifter, confidence woman
- Spouse(s): Maury Harris; Ned Lyons; Jim Brady; Billy Burke (criminal)
- Children: 7

Sophie Lyons (December 24, 1848 – May 8, 1924) was an American criminal and one of the country's most notorious female thieves, pickpockets, shoplifters, and confidence women during the mid-to-late 19th century. She and her husbands Ned Lyons, Jim Brady and Billy Burke were among the most sought-after career criminals in the U.S. and Canada, being wanted in several major cities including New York City, Philadelphia, Boston, Detroit and Montreal from the 1860s until the turn of the 20th century.

She and Lyons were prominent underworld figures in New York City during the post-American Civil War era as associates of Marm Mandelbaum, Lyons being a member of Mandelbaum's "inner circle" during the 1860s and 1870s. She eventually retired from criminal life and spent her later years involved in the rehabilitation of juvenile delinquents, and providing financial assistance and housing for reformed criminals and their families. Her autobiography, Why Crime Does Not Pay (1913), was published and distributed by publisher William Randolph Hearst.

== Biography ==
=== Early life and criminal career ===
Lyons was Jewish. She was born in Lauben, Germany, on December 24, 1848. Her mother taught her to pickpocket and shoplift and forced her out into the street to steal. Lyons claimed she had been first caught stealing at the age of three and was tried at the Essex Market police court, and she was again arrested for shoplifting at 12.

Lyons married another pickpocket, Maury Harris, when she was 16, but the marriage ended when Harris was arrested and sentenced to New York State Prison for two years. During her youth, she became known as a skilled pickpocket and confidence woman. She was considered a consummate actress who, even when caught by her victim, was able to "counterfeit every shade of emotion" to persuade them to release her. According to one incident in 1880, she was able to convince a store detective that she suffered from kleptomania.

Lyons eventually married Ned Lyons, known then as the "King of the Bank Robbers", and Sophie had six children during the marriage. Two years after their marriage, Ned was able to purchase a home from his share in a major bank robbery. Although he tried to discourage Lyons from pickpocketing, she continued to do so. In 1870 Ned was caught during an attempted bank robbery in Wyoming County, New York, and sent to Auburn Correctional Facility. Sophie pulled strings to get him moved to Sing Sing prison, where security was more lax. However she was convicted of shoplifting and sent to Sing Sing herself in 1871. Using a disguise, Ned escaped from the prison in 1872. He returned a few weeks later and helped his wife escape and they fled to Canada with their children.

=== Court battle with George Lyons ===
On the afternoon of January 31, 1880, Lyons returned to the Essex Market police court where she brought her oldest son, 14-year-old George, before the magistrate. She claimed he refused to attend school, often left home at nights to sleep in the streets and "was so generally unruly" that she requested that he be put in a juvenile correctional facility.

After she had finished, George shouted, "That woman is a thief and a shoplifter. I have seen her steal in Montreal and elsewhere." He denied his mother's charges, claiming she wanted to get rid of him, and that he had "recommendations showing his good character". He went on to make further criminal charges against his mother, continuing, "Yes, you want to get rid of me, and you're my mother. How can I tell you are when you have two husbands with whom you go all over the country, stealing everywhere?" These accusations caused a disturbance in the court room and the magistrate called for a recess to listen to both mother and son in private.

Lyons confessed to her criminal past and being the wife of Ned, however she maintained that she had spent considerable time and effort trying to keep her children from becoming criminals. She had sent George to three colleges in Canada, and her two daughters attended schools in Germany, but George returned to New York and began frequenting underworld resorts, including Dan Kerrigan's infamous Sixth Street saloon, where he performed as a singer and associated with known criminals. She also said that her son had obtained at least one of his recommendations by threatening a former employer by the name of Kate B. Woodward with a carving knife.

After hearing of this incident, Lyons invited George to her home on Montgomery Street and had him arrested by waiting police officers. George admitted that he had an argument with Woodward, who had withheld his pocket watch, but denied intimidating her to obtain his recommendation. He did admit to picking up a carving knife during the argument, but claimed he did not use it towards her or use threatening language. He was reportedly disruptive while his mother made her statement, making claims of child neglect and abandonment. The magistrate ruled that George would be held in custody until the claims of both parties could be investigated. George, being informed that he would not be released, had to be escorted from the court room by police and attempted to choke himself by swallowing a handkerchief.

=== Relocating to Detroit ===
By 1880 Lyons had split from Ned and moved her base of criminal operations to Detroit, partly due to the city's proximity to Canada. She spent much of the 1890s in the Midwest as a member of a burglary gang led by Billy Burke, whom she would later marry. She returned to New York in 1895 and, after her arrest by police detective Stephen O'Brien, she was put under close police surveillance by Brooklyn detectives, under orders from Superintendent McKelvey.

=== 1896 Return to New York City ===
On the afternoon of June 21, 1896, Lyons entered a dry goods store at Sixth Avenue and Fourteenth Street. Lyons, then using the alias Mary Watson, was approached by store detective Mary Plunkett, who had recognized her, and who informed her she was wanted by local police. When Lyons dismissed her, Plunkett grabbed her arm, attempting to bring her in by force. A crowd began to gather as the argument escalated. Plunkett told the crowd that "one of the most notorious pickpockets in the world" was standing before them. At that point, Lyons got free of Plunkett and left the store with the detective in pursuit. Plunkett pursued Lyons onto a streetcar, where she informed the driver that Lyons was wanted by police. The driver allowed Lyons onto the streetcar, replying to Plunkett that it was none of his business. As they reached Eighteenth Street, Plunkett was able to call two patrolmen and had Lyons placed under arrest.

Lyons refused to be taken back to the dry goods store, insisting that she be searched to prove her innocence, but was instead arrested and taken to the Mercer Street police station. She was held at the precinct until her arraignment at the Jefferson Market police court on June 22. She was charged with the theft of a pocketbook from an unknown woman in New Jersey, which contained $12 and a railroad ticket, and it was requested by the court that she be remanded. Her lawyer, Emanuel Friend, successfully argued for her release by pointing out the largely vague circumstances of the charges and the absence of the store detective. The magistrate agreed that the city had no evidence to prosecute Lyons and dismissed her case.

=== Retirement and later years ===
Following her "retirement" from crime in 1913, Lyons wrote her memoir, Why Crime Does Not Pay, and became a known philanthropist and prison reformer in Detroit. She also owned 40 houses, not including vacant property, due to real estate and business investments worth $500,000 (equivalent to $16.3 million in 2025). She publicly offered to provide rent-free homes for any criminals with families who were brought to Detroit by the Pathfinders' Club reform group. On February 2, 1916, she announced at the Pathfinders' annual dinner that she would be donating land worth $35,000 to establish a building for juvenile delinquents.

The Pathfinders' Club operated a similar "character building" facility at Lafayette Boulevard on Twenty-Fourth Street. Lyons specified that the gift was offered on the following condition: "The home is to be devoted to the work of convincing children who have begun to be criminals that they have chosen the wrong path, and also to training them so that they will have the strength to go alright. A secondary purpose is to provide a place in which adults who have fallen into crime may get a new start in life."

Not all of her subjects wanted to be reformed. On May 8, 1924, she let three men into her home- supposedly in the hope of reforming them. They asked her for the money and valuables that were reportedly hidden around her house. She refused. Her neighbors found her on the floor, in a coma. Her skull had been crushed. Taken to Grace Hospital in Detroit, Michigan, Lyons died later that evening of a massive brain hemorrhage. She was seventy-six years old.
