= Fence (criminal) =

Person who buys stolen goods to resell

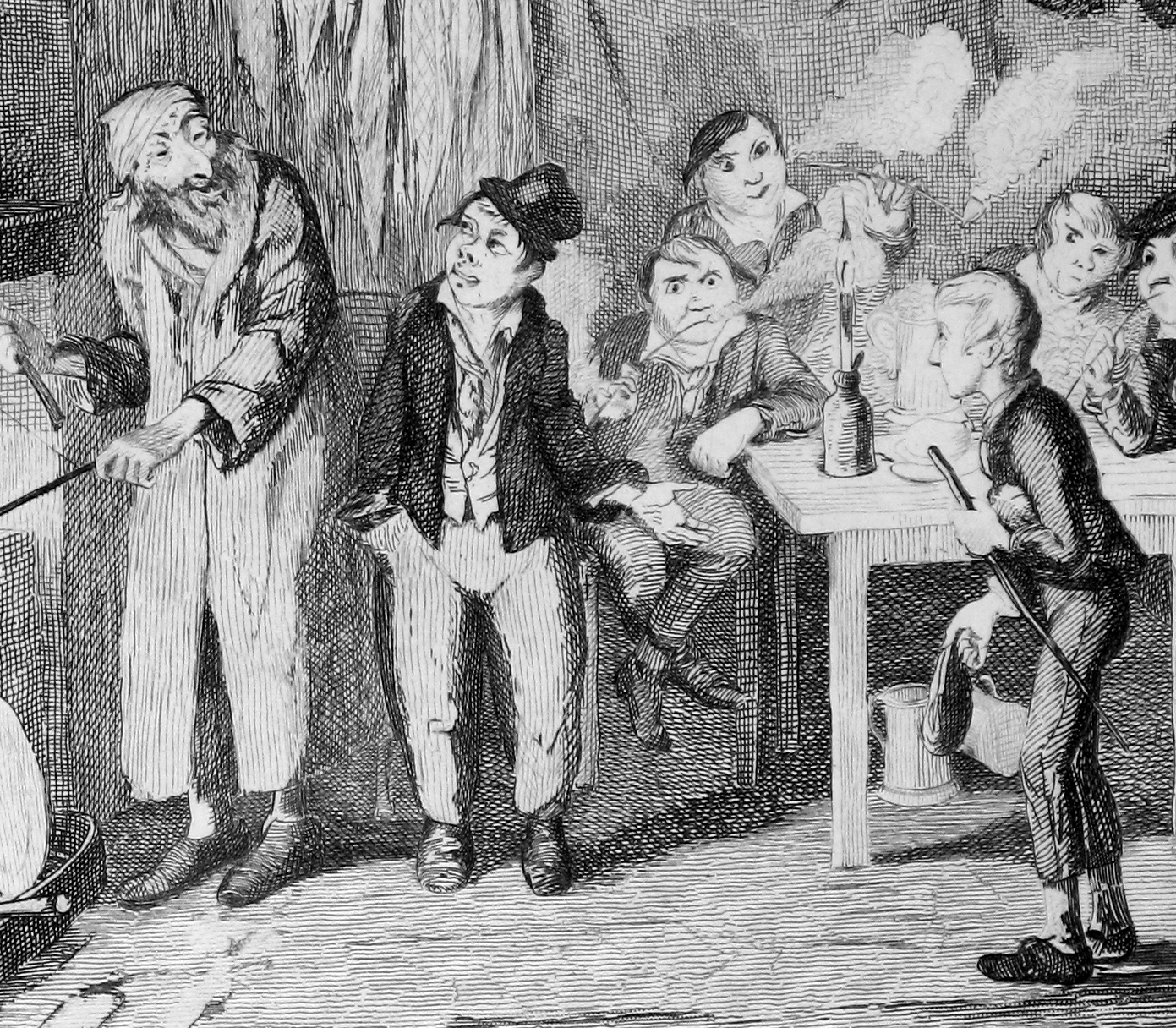
In Charles Dickens' 19th-century story Oliver Twist, Fagin (far left) is a fence who recruits homeless boys and trains them as pickpockets.

A fence, also known as a receiver, mover, or moving man, is an individual who knowingly buys stolen goods to later resell them for profit. The fence acts as a middleman between thieves and the eventual buyers of stolen goods who may not be aware that the goods are stolen.

As a verb (e.g. "to fence stolen goods"), the word describes the behaviour of the thief in the transaction with the fence.

As is the case with the word fence and its derivatives when used in its other common meanings (i.e. as a type of barrier or enclosure, and also as a sport), the word in this context is derived from the word defence. Among criminals, the fence originated in thieves' slang tracing from the notion of such transactions providing a "defence" against being caught.

Thieves who patronise fences are willing to accept a low profit margin to reduce their risks by instantly "washing their hands" of illicitly gotten loot (such as black market goods) and disassociating from the criminal act that procured it. After sales, fences recoup their investment by disguising the stolen nature of the goods (via methods such as repackaging and altering/effacing serial numbers) and reselling the goods as near to the market price as possible without drawing suspicion. This process often relies on a legal business (such as a pawnshop, flea market, or street vendor) to "launder" the stolen goods by intermixing them with legally-obtained items of the same type.

Fencing is illegal in all countries, but proving a violation of anti-fencing laws can be difficult.

== History of receiving ==
The fence, or receiver, is an old kind of criminal, historically attested in many countries, and with deep and complex dynamics within society.

=== Early modern England ===
Receiving was a widespread crime in Modern England and a concern for the English government of that period. It involved many other kinds of activities and crimes, and it saw its peak in the early 18th century with the notorious Jonathan Wild. Receiving is intrinsically connected to theft, as receivers, by definition, buy previously stolen goods to make profit out of them later. When organised theft grew in London thanks to the support of receivers, the establishment started to fight it with new laws, often aimed at receivers: receiving was acknowledged as the core of property crime.

Receiving was not considered as a felony (crime) in common law until 1691, when fences became potential targets of charges as accessories to theft. This meant that to judge a suspected receiver, it was necessary to condemn the related thief first. Later laws further focused on receivers, especially the 1718 Transportation Act, which, together with other measures, made fences main felons and not simply accessories to other felonies. Nonetheless, it was not easy to prove that a dealer knowingly accepted stolen goods, especially without the related theft event being fully cleared out. There are 5,892 proceedings stored in the Old Bailey Online archive where the offence category is receiving. Of these, 2,283 have a verdict category of guilty.

The 1718 Transportation Act also criminalised returning goods for a fee, which reveals that by then, receiving had already been taken to the next stage: returning goods to their owner, for a fee, instead of selling them in the second-hand market. Thieves could in this way act as go-betweens themselves, but go-betweens could raise some suspicions, whereas relying on receivers added a safety layer against effective prosecution. Victims of theft were often willing to pay to get their goods back, to spare themselves further troubles, especially if the items taken had the potential to reveal unflattering details about their personal affairs. In addition, for many centuries, prosecution in England was entirely at the expense (of personal money, time, and effort) of the prosecutor. Therefore, given the difficulty of actually proving receiving in courts, common people, especially shopkeepers, often preferred compounding, feeling that prosecuting was not worth it. This gave a considerable advantage to receivers

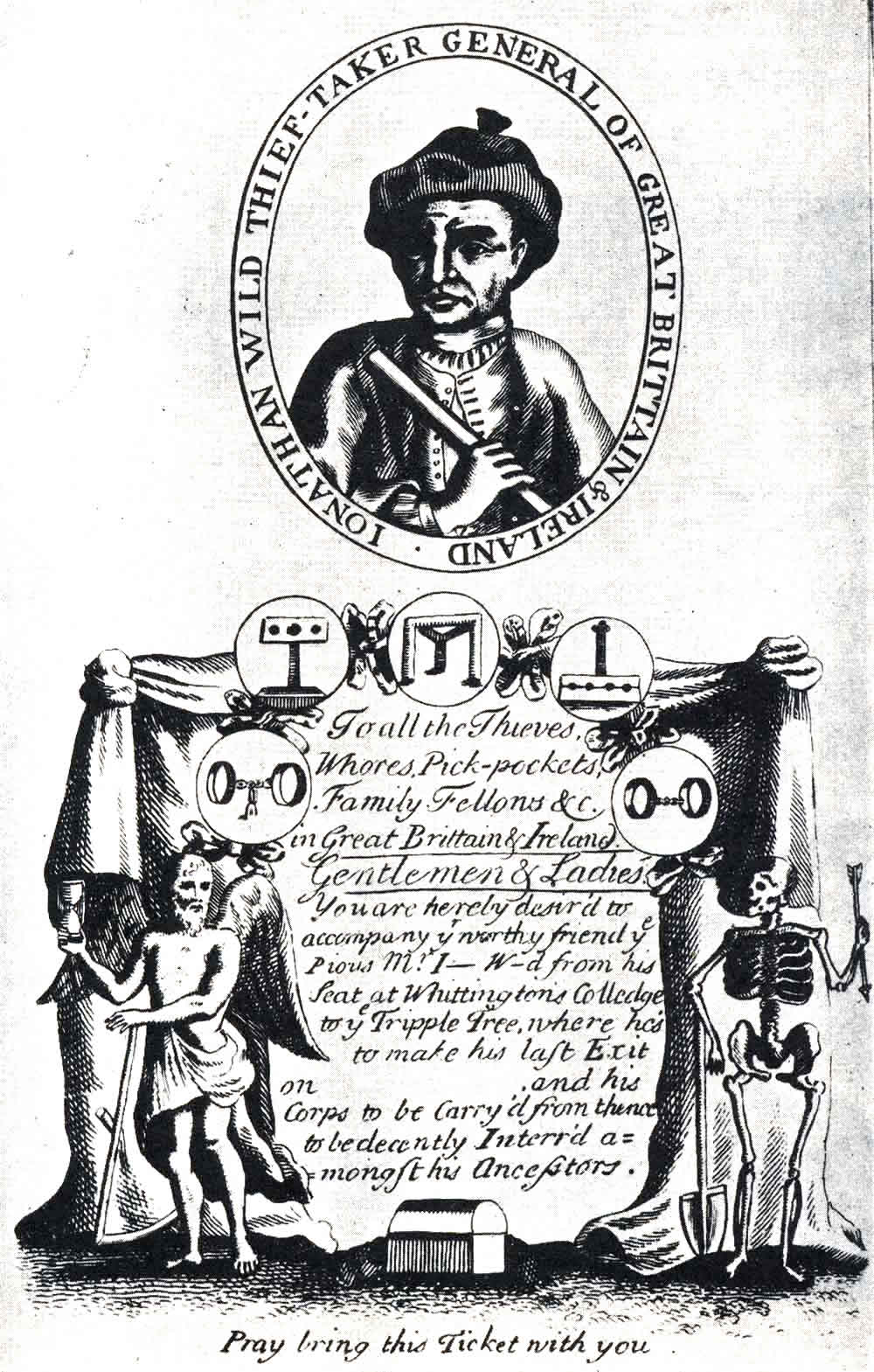
Ticket to the hanging of Jonathan Wild.

To effectively act as go-betweens for compounding, or brokerage, fences needed to personally know thieves or have ways to easily interact and bargain with them for a common benefit about compounding: nobody was in a better position to do so than thief-takers. Thief-takers grew increasingly notorious in England as a reward was introduced by the Crown for each successfully condemned criminal. Some of them, such as Anthony Dunn, publicly referred to as "pretended Thiefe-taker" in a 1707 document, used their social power as thief-takers as an advantage for receiving. Thief-takers were usually so involved with thieves and gangs of thieves that they could easily condemn them for the reward, or use this power to intimidate and command thieves to do their bidding. In exchange for clemency or protection from capture or condemnation, they could have thieves to steal under their command. Indeed, thief-takers could act as direct instigators, supporting their thieves with intelligence or offering them shelter at need (when convenient), and then acting as receivers with the stolen goods. Through parallel occupations, receivers could feed their own business.

Confirmation of how thief-taking and receiving were tightly connected is demonstrated by the career of Charles Hitchen, who was known as a thief-taker. He bought off the position of Under City Marshal with his wife's money to have one of the best positions amongst the thief-takers of the City. However, a vast part of his income came from the receiving activity related to the network of connections with London's underworld. Hitchen controlled this network through his official (that is to say, legal) position as a thief-taker.

There existed a complex relation between receiving, theft, and corruption, as well as official activities such as thief-taking or pawnbroking, each element enhanced the others in a vicious circle. The master of this powerful synergy of London underworld was Jonathan Wild, who replaced his previous master, Charles Hitchen, in 1713, and gained control of London's crime and the title of "thief-taker general". His power was due to his ruthless thief-taking and intimidation activities as well as a complex web of intelligence also built around the diffusion of newspapers. However, overly bold receiving was his undoing, as it provoked the English government to promote further laws against receiving and related activities, such as the Transportation Act in 1718, also known as "Jonathan Wild Act", and its extension in 1720, which made returning goods for a fee a felony of the same importance and punishment as the crime (theft) related to the goods returned (which meant a capital offence in most cases, with raised potential reward for definitive evidence, from £40 to £140). Eventually, the government took direct action against Wild through lawyers, succeeding in condemning and executing him in 1725.

==== Women and receiving ====
There is no registered case of female fences of the same fame of Wild or Hitchen. However, women had active roles in both receiving and theft. Elizabeth Hitchen gave her inheritance money to her husband Charles to buy the Under City Marshal office for his plans. Moreover, women could also be active fences. For example, Elizabeth Fisher managed her own receiving business in her husband's alehouse. As of April 2025 a total of 6,638 proceedings were stored in the Old Bailey Online archive where the offence category is receiving. Of these, 2,250, slightly more than one-third, have a defendant gender category of female.

=== Early modern English literature ===
The growth of the crime of receiving in Early Modern society, combined with the increasing interest of society on reading, led to depictions of the crime in the works of writers such as Daniel Defoe's Moll Flanders and John Gay's The Beggar's Opera.

==== Moll Flanders ====
The novel Moll Flanders narrates the whole life of its protagonist (Moll Flanders), but a relevant part of it is about her becoming a master thief. Moll's activity as a thief relied on the protection and support of her governess, who also acted as a receiver for the goods stolen by her affiliates. She is the one who buys Moll's stolen goods the first time, as Moll narrates "I was now at a loss for a market for my goods... At last I resolved to go to my old governess." The governess character sealed Moll's fate as a thief, and eventually taught her the basics of thievery, redirecting Moll to work with other senior thieves. Defoe shows how crucial as well as subtle receiving was in building the whole of crime activity in London.

The Governess is officially a pawnbroker, and she uses this legal business to also sell stolen goods. Sometimes, such as in the case of a silver inscribed mug stolen by Moll, she smelts metals, to avoid getting caught while re-selling. Along with receiving activity, she actively protects and supports many criminals and thieves to secure a steady income from her activity.

The same governess protects and offers refuge to her affiliates whenever possible, or recruits thieves into small groups, always via middlemen, to protect their thieves' identities in case some of them were caught and willing to confess.

She is also a main intelligence source and often a direct instigator to theft, such as in a case of fire in a well-off house in the neighbourhood (more vulnerable to theft because of the sudden emergency), and finally becomes a broker for goods stolen by Moll to a drunken gentleman. In that case, the amount gained is allegedly greater than what she would have gained by standard re-selling in the secondary market.

The Governess embodies female social cunning in London's underworld, from Defoe's point of view. She is a typical receiver of her time, and whereas many male receivers used thief-taking as an official business, she relies on pawnbroking.

=== China ===
Under traditional Chinese law a fence, or receiver, (銷贓者), was a merchant who bought and sold stolen goods. Fences were part of the extensive network of accomplices in the criminal underground of Ming and Qing China. Their occupation entailed criminal activity, but as fences often had a non-criminal primary occupation, they acted as liaisons between the respectable community and the criminal underworld, living a "precarious existence on the fringes of respectable society."

Fences often worked alongside bandits in a network of criminal accomplices that was essential to ensuring both the safety and the success of fences.

The path into the occupation of a fence stemmed, to a large degree, from necessity. As most fences came from the ranks of poorer people, they often took whatever work they could—both legal and illegal. Working as a fence was an option that was not too strenuous, but had the potential to bring in a fair sum of income.

Most fences worked within their own town or village. For example, in some satellite areas of the capital, military troops lived within or close to the commoner population and they had the opportunity to hold illegal trades with commoners.

In areas like Baoding and Hejian, local peasants and community members not only purchased military livestock such as horses and cattle, but also helped to hide the stolen livestock from the military. Local peasants and other members of the community became fences and hid criminal activities from officials, in exchange for goods or money from soldiers.

==== Types of fences ====
Most fences were not individuals who only bought and sold stolen goods to make a living. The majority of fences had a variety of legitimate occupations, including labourers and peddlers. Such individuals encountered criminals, for example in the markets while working, and formed acquaintances and temporary associations for mutual aid and protection. In one example, an owner of a teahouse overheard the conversation between Deng Yawen, a criminal, and others planning a robbery and offered to help to sell the loot for a portion of the spoils.

At times, the robbers themselves filled the role of fences, selling to people they met on the road. This may have been preferable for robbers because they would not have to pay the fence a portion of the spoils.

Butchers received stolen animals because owners could no longer recognise their livestock after the animal had been slaughtered. Animals were very valuable commodities within Ming China, and a robber could potentially sustain a living from stealing livestock and selling them to butcher-fences.

Although fences usually worked with physical stolen property, fences who also worked as itinerant barbers also sold information as a good. Itinerant barbers often amassed important sources of information and news as they travelled, and sold significant pieces of information to those who offered money. Often, such information was sold to criminals in search of places to hide or individuals to rob. In this way, itinerant barbers also served the role as a keeper of information that could be sold both to members of the criminal underground and to powerful clients.

Fences not only sold stolen goods but were also occasionally involved in human trafficking hostages that bandits had kidnapped. Women and children were the easiest to sell and among the most common "objects" the fences sold. Most female hostages were sold to fences and then sold as prostitutes, wives, or concubines. One example of human trafficking comes from Chen Akuei's gang, who abducted a servant girl and sold her to Lin Baimao, who in turn sold her as a wife for thirty pieces of silver. In contrast to women who required beauty to sell for a high price, children were sold regardless of their physical appearance or family background. Young boys were often sold as servants or entertainers, while young girls were often sold as prostitutes.

==== Network of connections ====
As with merchants of honest goods, one of the most significant tools of a fence was their network of connections. As the middlemen between robbers and clients, fences needed to form and maintain widespread connections in both the "polite" society and among criminals. There were cases in which members of "well-respected" society became receivers and harbourers. They not only helped bandits to sell the stolen goods but also acted as agents of the bandits in collecting protection money from local merchants and residents. These "part-time" fences with high social status used their connection with bandits to help themselves gain social capital as well as wealth.

It was important for fences to maintain a positive relationship with their customers, especially their richer gentry clients. When some members of the local elites joined the ranks of fences, they not only protected bandits to protect their own business interests, but they actively took down any potential threats to their illegal profiting, even government officials. In the Zhejiang Province, local elites not only caused the dismissal of provincial commissioner, Zhu Wan, but also eventually "[drove] him to suicide".

It was also essential for fences to maintain a relationship with bandits to protect their livelihood. However, it was just as true that bandits needed fences to make a living. As a result, fences often held dominance in their relationship with bandits. Taking advantage of their dominance in their relationships with bandits, fences also cheated bandits by manipulating the prices they paid bandits for stolen property. This was possible because fences often had an official and legal means of making a living, as well as illegal activities, and could threaten to turn bandits in to the authorities.

==== Safe houses ====
Aside from simply buying and selling stolen goods, fences often played additional roles in the criminal underground of early China. Inns and teahouses became places for bandits and gangs to gather to exchange information and plan for their next crime. Harborers (people who provided safe houses for criminals) often played the role of a fence as well, in receiving stolen goods from their harboured criminals to sell to other customers. Safe houses also included brothels and opium dens, as well as gambling parlors, and employees or owners of such institutions often functioned as harborers, as well as fences. These safe houses were located in places where there was a high floating population and where people from a variety of social backgrounds interacted.

Brothels also helped bandits to hide and sell stolen goods because of the special Ming Law that exempted brothels from being held responsible "for the criminal actions of their clients." Although the government required brothel owners to report any suspicious activity, the lack of government enforcement as well as the motivation of owners to make an extra income from fencing led brothels to become safe houses for bandits and gangs.

Pawnshops were also affiliated with fencing stolen goods. The owners or employees of such shops often paid a low sum far below market value for stolen goods to bandits, and resold the goods to earn a profit.

==== Punishment ====
Two different Ming Laws, the Da Ming Lü 大明律 and the Da Gao 大诰, drafted by the Hongwu Emperor Zhu Yuanzhang, sentenced fences to different penalties based on the category and value of the products that were stolen.

In coastal regions, illegal trading with foreigners, as well as smuggling became a concern for the government during the mid to late Ming era. The government passed a law in which illegal smugglers who traded with foreigners without the consent of the government would be punished with exile to the border for military service.

In areas where military troops were stationed, stealing and selling military property would result in more severe punishment. In the Jiaqing time, a case was recorded of a robber stealing and selling military horses. The emperor himself gave orders that the thieves who had stolen the horses and the people who had helped to sell the horses would be put on a cangue and sent to labour in a border military camp.

In salt mines, the penalty for workers who stole and/or sold salt was the most severe. Because of the enormous value of salt in Ming China, anyone who was arrested and found guilty of stealing and selling government salt was put to death.

== Approach ==
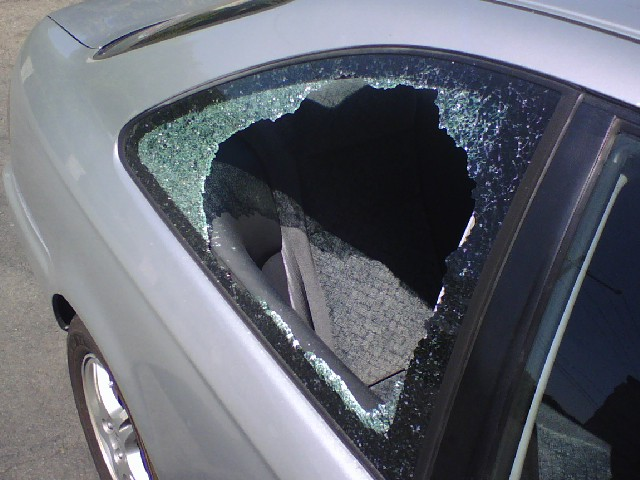
Car stereo thieves typically want to sell stolen items quickly. By selling to fences, they avoid the hassle and suspicion of selling directly to the final buyers.

Fencing is often conducted through legal businesses. Some fences maintain a legitimate-seeming "front" through which they can sell stolen merchandise. Depending on the type of stolen merchandise a fence deals in, "front" businesses might be discount stores, used goods stores, coin and gem stores, auction houses, flea markets, or auto salvage yards. The degree of illicit activity in each "front" business differs from fence to fence. Fences will often attempt to mix stolen goods with legitimately-obtained merchandise, so that if the actual source of the stolen goods is discovered they can plausibly deny any knowledge of such illegal activity. Thus, while one fence's salvage yard may consist mainly of stolen auto parts, another fence's used goods store might consist mainly of legitimately purchased used goods, with the stolen merchandise acting as a minor, but profitable, sideline.

Thieves agree to use fences because their alternatives may present a greater risk of the thief being caught. As well, selling stolen goods takes a great deal of time and effort (transaction costs), as the thief would have to try to contact a number of potential buyers and show them the merchandise. Some habitual thieves are so well known to police that if the thief were to attempt to sell any used goods, this would quickly draw the attention of law enforcement.

The fence disguises the stolen nature of the goods, if possible, so that he or she can sell them closer to the market price. Depending on the stolen item, the fence may attempt to remove, deface, or replace serial numbers on the stolen item before reselling it. In some cases, fences will transport the stolen items to a different city to sell them, because this lessens the likelihood that the items will be recognised. However, a disadvantage of trying to sell stolen goods outside a fence's home city directly to buyers is that the fence may not be well known in the community and thus not likely to be trusted by potential customers whether law-abiding or otherwise. To overcome this, fences often develop clandestine relationships with trusted fences in other locales, thus allowing stolen goods to be easily exchanged in bulk by fences in different cities.

For some types of stolen goods, fences disassemble the good and sell the individual parts, because the sale of parts is less risky. For example, a stolen car or bicycle may be disassembled so that the parts can be sold individually. Another tactic used by some fences is to retain stolen items for some time before selling them, which lessens the likelihood that the burglary victims or police will be actively looking for the items in auctions and pawnshops.

The prices fences pay thieves typically depend both on norms and on legitimate market rates for the items in question. Vulnerable sellers, such as drug addicts or casual thieves, may receive less than 20% of an item's value. Higher prices, sometimes as high as 50% of an item's value in a legal market, can be commanded by a professional thief, especially one who has managed to remain relatively unknown to police and/or who concentrates on valuable items. Fences may take advantage of thieves by deceiving them about the value of items and the relevant market conditions. For example, a fence may falsely tell a petty thief that the market for the type of good which the thief is selling is flooded with this type of merchandise, to justify paying out a lower price.

There are different types of fences. One way to categorise fences is by the type of good in which they trade, such as jewels, power tools, or electronics. Another way is by their level of involvement in buying and selling stolen goods; for some, fencing is an occasional "sideline" activity, while it is an economic mainstay for others. At the lowest level, a hustler or drug dealer may occasionally accept stolen goods. At the highest level would be a fence whose main criminal income comes from buying and selling stolen items. Two tiers of fences can be distinguished: The lower level of fences are those who directly buy stolen goods from thieves and burglars. At a higher level are the "master fences", who do not deal with street-level thieves, but only with other fences.

Research on fences shows that they view themselves as entrepreneurs, relying on networking with and patronage by prominent criminals to become successful in their word-of-mouth-based "wheeling and dealing." They occupy the middle ground between the criminal world (thieves, burglars, and shoplifters) and the legitimate world (everyday people who purchase used goods). Some active fences go farther in their business, maintaining longstanding contacts and even teaching thieves how to practice their craft, whether by identifying specific products or by teaching them tools of the trade.

The degree to which the purchasers of the stolen goods know or suspect that the items are stolen varies. If a purchaser buys a high-quality item for a low price, in cash, from a stranger at a bar or from the back of a van, there is a higher likelihood that the items may be stolen. On the other hand, if a purchaser buys the same high-quality item for the standard retail price from a used goods store, and obtains a proper receipt, the purchaser may reasonably believe that the item is not stolen (even if, in fact, it is a stolen item).

== E-fencing ==
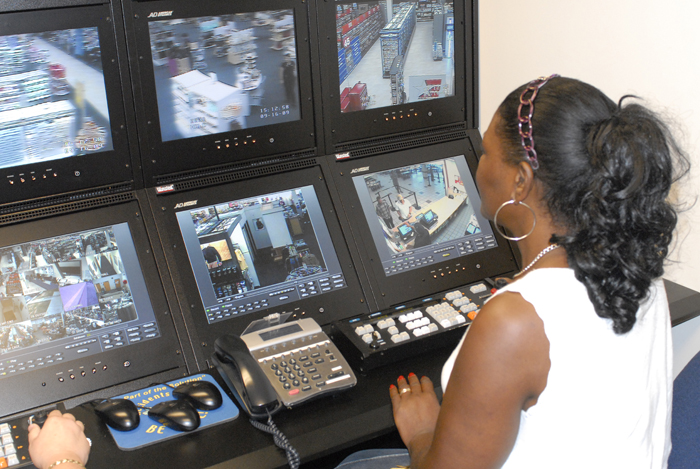
Stores have complained that increasingly, shoplifters are stealing goods with the intent of selling them anonymously online. In this photo, a security guard scans the security cameras for shoplifters.

E-fencing is the sale of items on the Internet that have been obtained illegally. There are some key differences between "e-fencing" and traditional fencing. Both involve fraudulently obtained goods and/or services being bought and sold in transactions involving a minimum of three distinct parties, usually understood to be the thief who stole the goods, the fence who acts as an intermediary, and the final purchaser. With traditional fencing, typically, the only innocent and unwitting party is the final purchaser. On the other hand, e-fencing may describe transactions in which there is direct interaction between the original thief and the final purchaser, while the "intermediary" is an online platform. In e-fencing (unlike traditional fencing) the level of culpability on the part of the intermediary platform may vary. On one hand, the platform's operators may be knowingly or recklessly permitting such activity (for instance in a darknet market) and thus might be thought of as a fence in a more traditional sense. At the other extreme are intermediaries that are legitimate and respected platforms being used in defiance of their terms and conditions and in spite of aggressive and ongoing actions to interdict such illegal activities.

E-fencing can be mixed with sales to pawnbrokers. The auction website eBay, being easy to reach for the average thief, is a popular location for e-fencing; customers reported more than eight thousand crimes from the website in 2008, many of which involved the sale of stolen property. Classified websites like Craigslist, AutoTrader.com, Pennysaver online, etc. are used for fencing goods online and circumventing the middleman fencer, as are a number of illegal darknet markets.

E-fenced items may have been shoplifted or otherwise stolen, or they may have been purchased with stolen credit cards or similar banking information. The latter practice is often intertwined with carding, which is the trafficking of stolen credit card numbers en masse. The sale of stolen credit cards, often taking place on darknet markets, is a form of e-fencing in its own right, and plays a role in purchasing physical goods that may be either e-fenced themselves or fenced through more traditional means.

Crime rings steal and/or use stolen financial information to pay for in-demand items from retailers and then sell those items online, relying on the Internet's ability to reach buyers around the world and its anonymity; some theft rings even take pre-orders, confident that they can steal and/or fraudulently pay for whatever is currently in demand. In the United States, major retailers such as Wal-Mart and Target have advocated for federal legislation to combat Internet fencing. Some such proposed legislation would require major sales websites (e.g. eBay and Amazon.com) to retain some items' serial numbers and to release information to retailers about major sellers whom the retailers believe to be relying on stolen property. Such proposals have been opposed by the online retailers who would be required to maintain these records and take these actions.

Stolen financial information can also itself be e-fenced by using such data to purchase intangible goods and services on behalf of unsuspecting buyers. In some cases, criminals anonymously pose as agents selling items such as airline tickets at significantly discounted prices, while they are actually using stolen financial information to purchase such goods and services at the regular price from legitimate websites using the real identity of the final purchaser. Such criminals may request payment in cryptocurrency such as bitcoin to further cover their tracks. Once the fraud is discovered, it is usually the final purchaser(s) who will be held liable for the full amount of the purchase(s), and possibly even be at risk of criminal prosecution themselves depending on the jurisdiction. One airline representative described the practice as being "akin to buying a television set in a bar."

An eBay spokesman stated, "Perhaps the dumbest place to try to fence stolen materials is on eBay," and news agencies have reported incidents of the police purchasing stolen property directly from thieves, leading to their capture. By early 2007, e-fencing had become a $37 billion business.

== Legal aspects ==
Fencing is illegal almost everywhere, usually under a similar rationale as in the United States, where receipt of stolen property is a crime in every state, as well as a federal crime if the property crossed a state line. Occasionally federal agents will temporarily set up a false fence sting operation. Fencing is a common source of income for organised crime. In England and Wales, as in many U.S. states, the crime requires three elements: stolen property, the receiver's act of receiving or hiding it, and his knowledge of its stolen status.

Pawnbrokers have often been associated with fencing, though in many jurisdictions, government identification must be shown to pawn an item and police regularly check pawnshops for stolen goods and repossess any stolen items. While pawnbrokers do not like this characterisation of their business, police efforts have indicated that some pawnbrokers are involved in fencing.

== See also ==
- Chop shop
- Handling stolen goods
- Sting operation
