= John Duff (counterfeiter) =

- Born: John Michael McElduff; September 1759 – August 1760; South Carolina, British America
- Died: June 4, 1799 or 1805 (aged 38-45): Battery Rock, Illinois Country, Northwest Territory, U.S., or; Saline River Salt Springs, Illinois Country, Northwest Territory, U.S., or; Caseyville, Livingston County, Kentucky, U.S.
- Cause of death: gunshot wound
- Resting place: unknown
- Other names: John McDuff, Jean Duff, Jean Michel Duff, John Michael Duff, Michael Duff
- Occupations: frontiersman, hunter, horse thief, cattle thief, hog thief, soldier, salt maker, criminal gang leader, counterfeiter
- Spouses: Letticia "Letty" or "Seddy" Smith; Native American woman, name unknown
- Children: 1
- Military career
- Allegiance: Virginia, United States
- Branch: Virginia State Forces
- Service years: 1778–1780s
- Rank: private, sergeant
- Units: Captain John Williams' Company (Kaskaskia) and Captain Richard McCarty's Company (Cahokia), Illinois Regiment
- Conflicts: American Revolutionary War: Illinois Campaign (1778-1779); Capture of Kaskaskia and Cahokia (1778); Siege of Fort Vincennes (1779); Battle of St. Louis (1780)

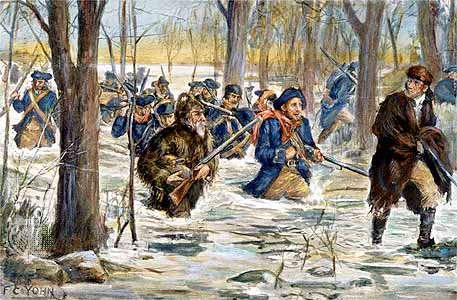
Private John Duff served in the ranks of George Rogers Clark's Illinois Regiment, walking through chest-high, icy water, on the march to Vincennes, January 1779, in a painting, by Frederick Coffay Yohn

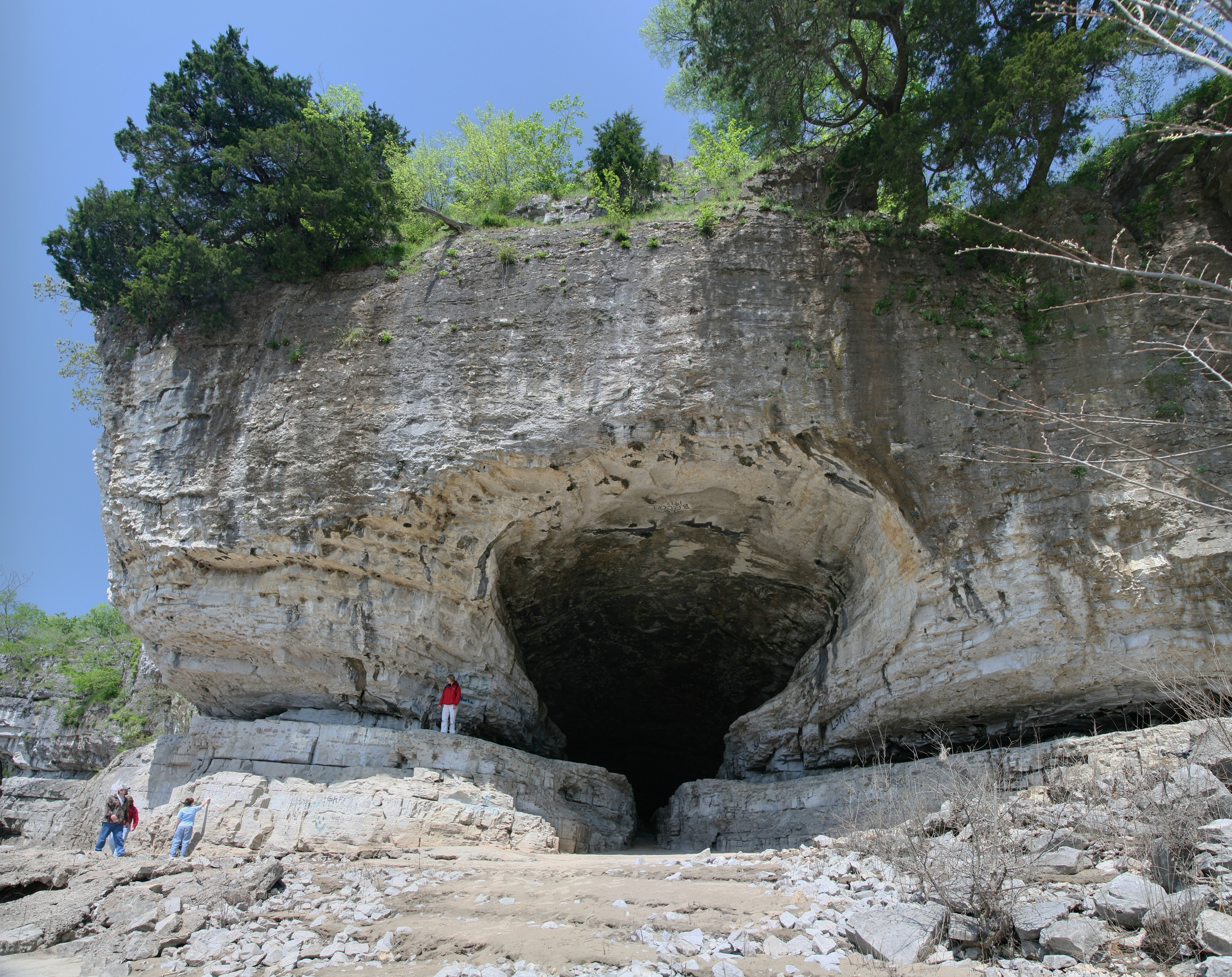
In the 1790s, John Duff and his criminal associate, Philip Alston, carried out their counterfeiting operation, in the relative seclusion of the wilderness, at Cave-in-Rock

John Duff, born John McElduff, or John Michael McElduff, because early court records referred to him as John Michael Duff (September 1759 or August 1760 – June 4, 1799 or 1805), was a counterfeiter, criminal gang leader, horse thief, cattle thief, hog thief, salt maker, longhunter, scout, and soldier who assisted in George Rogers Clark's campaign to capture the Illinois country for the American rebel side during the Revolutionary War.

== Early life and family history ==
John Michael McElduff was born sometime between September 1759 and August 1760 in the British Province of South Carolina, according to his court testimony in August 1781, where he claimed to be 21 years old. John's father may have been the Thomas McElduff murdered by Philip McElduff, a brother, of Thomas, some time prior to November 1761. His mother later remarried, and his stepfather moved the family to the Natchez District, Mississippi region of the colony of British West Florida, on the Mississippi River, prior to the start of the American Revolutionary War. McElduff is believed to be a grandson of a Thomas McElduff, Sr., who received two land grants for military service in the French and Indian War on the south side of the Tyger River, in Union County, South Carolina on February 7, 1754.

== American Revolutionary War service and life in the Illinois Country ==
Around 1778, Duff was living in the Illinois Country, later referred to as the "American Bottom." While leading a group of longhunters returning to Kaskaskia, John Duff, John Saunders, and the rest of the hunting party were intercepted by Colonel George Rogers Clark's soldiers and his Virginia frontiersmen soldiers, near the ruins of Fort Massac. Suspected of being British spies, they immediately took an American oath of allegiance, where Duff and his men joined Clark's Illinois Regiment, Virginia State Forces. Duff enlisted into Captain John Williams' Company in Cahokia and rose to the rank of sergeant in the Illinois Regiment.

In 1780, while Duff was posted with the garrison in Cahokia, a British force attacked St. Louis, which was under colonial Spanish rule, and American-held Cahokia in 1780, with a motley army of British Loyalists composed of French-Canadiens, fur traders, and their Indian allies. McElduff and other soldiers were on reconnaissance, for General Clark, observing the British movements, near the Mississippi River. The group was attacked by an Indian war party, barely escaping with their lives. The combined American, French, and Spanish forces successfully repelled the enemy assaults. In the George Rogers Clark Papers and Illinois court records, Duff was referred to both as "John McElduff" and "John McDuff."

In the mid-late 1780s, Duff was living in Kaskaskia, Illinois and was in business with two brothers of the captain of the Ohio County, Virginia Militia and Revolutionary War Patriot, Samuel Mason who later became the notorious river pirate. According to the French Kaskaskia records, the Duff name was recorded as, "Jean Michel Duff" and "John Michael Duff." In 1786, John, Daniel, and another son of Thomas McElduff sold land tracts for two different property deeds. There was a Daniel McElduff and McDuff who was also at Kaskaskia in the 1780s and was likely the brother of John Duff. When the McElduffs first arrived, the pre-American Revolution, British-controlled, French-speaking settlement of Kaskaskia was not recorded. Daniel McDuff owned slaves while residing in Kaskaskia, as was the custom of transplanted Southerners and the French creole population in the Illinois Country. After the departure of the bandit John Dodge, who lived in the area from 1784 to 1790, John McElduff was elected, in 1790, as one of six judges, to the Kaskaskia town court. According to the French records, on February 6, 1794, John McElduff and Seddy, his wife, sold a dwelling and grounds in Kaskaskia Village, to J.R. Jones for $200; (~$4,340 in 2025) this Jones may have been John Rice Jones, a politician and Illinois Regiment veteran.

== Counterfeiting at Cave-In-Rock, Northwest Territory and in Kentucky ==
After 1790, John Duff was associated with the South Carolina counterfeiter, Philip Alston, the Virginia river pirate, Samuel Mason, and the North Carolina serial killers the Harpe brothers, at Cave-in-Rock, in the U.S. Northwest Territory, where he learned the illicit business of counterfeiting, known as "coining", where he could make a lot money in criminal pursuits. By this time, he had left the historical record and from this point on, he was referred to in folklore as, just Duff or "Duff the Counterfeiter." Even as a counterfeiter, John Duff was not a violent man by nature, and he was never known to have killed anyone. Whether or not John McElduff and his wife left Kaskaskia permanently after 1794 is not known, but folklore mentioned John Duff, as owning a slave named Pompey and tales of his miraculously avoiding numerous attempts at capture and death from local regulator vigilantes and the U.S. Army.

== Death ==
For nearly a decade, Duff had become a scourge along the lower Ohio River region. On June 4, 1799, a group of three Shawnee Indians and a French courier du bois were hired by U.S. Army officer, Captain Zebulon Pike, Sr., father of the explorer Zebulon Pike, who was the commandant at the frontier outpost Fort Massac, now Metropolis, Illinois. This mercenary party was given orders to kill John Duff, which they did at his house, which was located either at Battery Rock, according to the newspaper account, on the Illinois side of the Ohio River or across the river at what would later become Caseyville, Kentucky on the Tradewater River as, recalled in the History of Union County, Kentucky. According to Revolutionary Soldiers Buried in Illinois, Duff was killed in 1805 on Ripple Island, on the Saline River, in Gallatin County, Illinois and buried near the local salt springs.

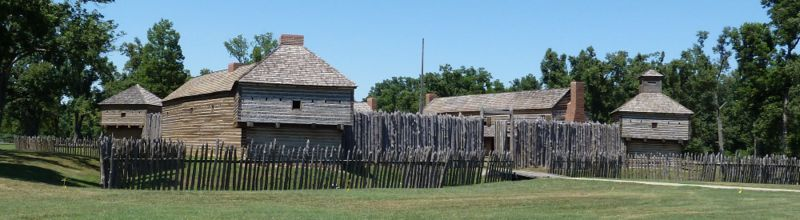
Fort Massac, down river, from Cave-in-Rock, where, in 1799, the U.S. Army commandant, Captain Zebulon Pike, Sr., father of the explorer, hired three Shawnee Indians and a French courier du bois, to hunt down and kill John Duff.

== See also ==
- Peter Alston
- Edward Bonney
- Abel Buell
- Mary Butterworth
- Sile Doty
- David Farnsworth
- James Ford
- Catherine Murphy
- John Murrell
- Sturdivant Gang
- Samuel C. Upham
