= Philip Alston (counterfeiter) =

American counterfeiter and outlaw (c.1740 – c.1799)

- Born: February 18, 1740 or 1741; Province of South Carolina (British Royal Colony), British North America, British Empire, present-day South Carolina
- Died: After 1799 but before 1807 (aged 59-67?); New Madrid, Spanish Louisiana Territory, present-day New Madrid, Missouri?
- Other names: Phelipe Alston, Alston, Alston the Counterfeiter, Ruffles, Gentleman Counterfeiter
- Occupations: counterfeiter, river pirate, criminal gang leader, planter, thief, land speculator, soldier, politician, tavern keeper, salt maker, fur trader, banker, businessman, teacher, preacher, farmer, empresario
- Employer(s): Spanish government, self-employed
- Known for: Counterfeiting coins in the Carolinas, Virginia, Natchez, West Florida and at Cave-in-Rock, along the Mississippi and Ohio Rivers, as an associate of John Duff, being one of the first settlers, bankers, and businessmen, of Russelville, Kentucky, and empresario in New Madrid, Spanish Louisiana Territory
- Title: Empresario of Mexico
- Movement: Natchez Revolt of 1781, Cumberland Compact of 1780, Yazoo Land Scandal of 1795
- Spouses: Temperance Smith, Mary Molly Temple, Mildred McCoy
- Children: Peter Alston
- Military career
- Allegiance: Kingdom of Great Britain British West Florida
- Branch: British Army Loyalist local volunteer corps
- Service years: 1781
- Unit: Natchez Volunteers
- Conflicts: American Revolutionary War: Natchez Revolt (1781)

Philip Alston (February 18, 1740 or 1741 – after 1799) was an 18th-century Spanish-American counterfeiter, both before and after the American Revolution. He operated in Virginia and the Carolinas before the war, and in Kentucky and Illinois afterward. He was associated with Cave-in-Rock and his son, outlaw Peter Alston, and counterfeiter John Duff. He was an early American settler in Natchez, as well as in the Cumberland and Red River valleys in Kentucky and Tennessee.

== Early life in South Carolina, North Carolina, and Virginia ==
Philip Alston was born February 18, 1740, or 1741, the son of Solomon Alston and Sarah Ann "Nancy" Hinton. He had at least one brother named John. Alston was probably born in the British Royal colony of the Province of South Carolina, where the Alston family first settled in North America. The Alston surname was very common in this colony. His family moved to the Province of North Carolina when he was quite young.

Alston was believed to have married in 1765 in North Carolina to a woman named Mary Molly Temple. He may have married again to Mildred McCoy, after whom his second son received his middle name.

Philip Alston and his wife were known to have had five surviving children:

- Frances Alston, born about 1766, who married James D. Dromgoole (1758–1818) in 1782.
- John McCoy Alston, born in 1767, likely the John Alston that proved the 1799 deed.
- Philip Alston Jr., who was deeded numerous enslaved persons by the 1799 deed.
- Elizabeth Elise Alston, married John Gilbert.
- Peter Alston, known as a counterfeiter and river pirate. He was said to be Little Harpe's partner in the murder of pirate and outlaw leader Samuel Mason.

It is not known when the senior Philip Alston learned and started counterfeiting. In 1770–1771 he and his brother John Alston were wanted by the law for counterfeiting activities in North Carolina and in 1773 in the colony of Virginia. As authorities were targeting counterfeiters in North Carolina, as well as the neighboring colonies of Virginia and South Carolina, the Alston brothers fled in 1772 or 1773 to Natchez, British West Florida, on the Mississippi River. This former French colonial city was located about 200 miles upriver from New Orleans.

== Change of rule in Natchez ==
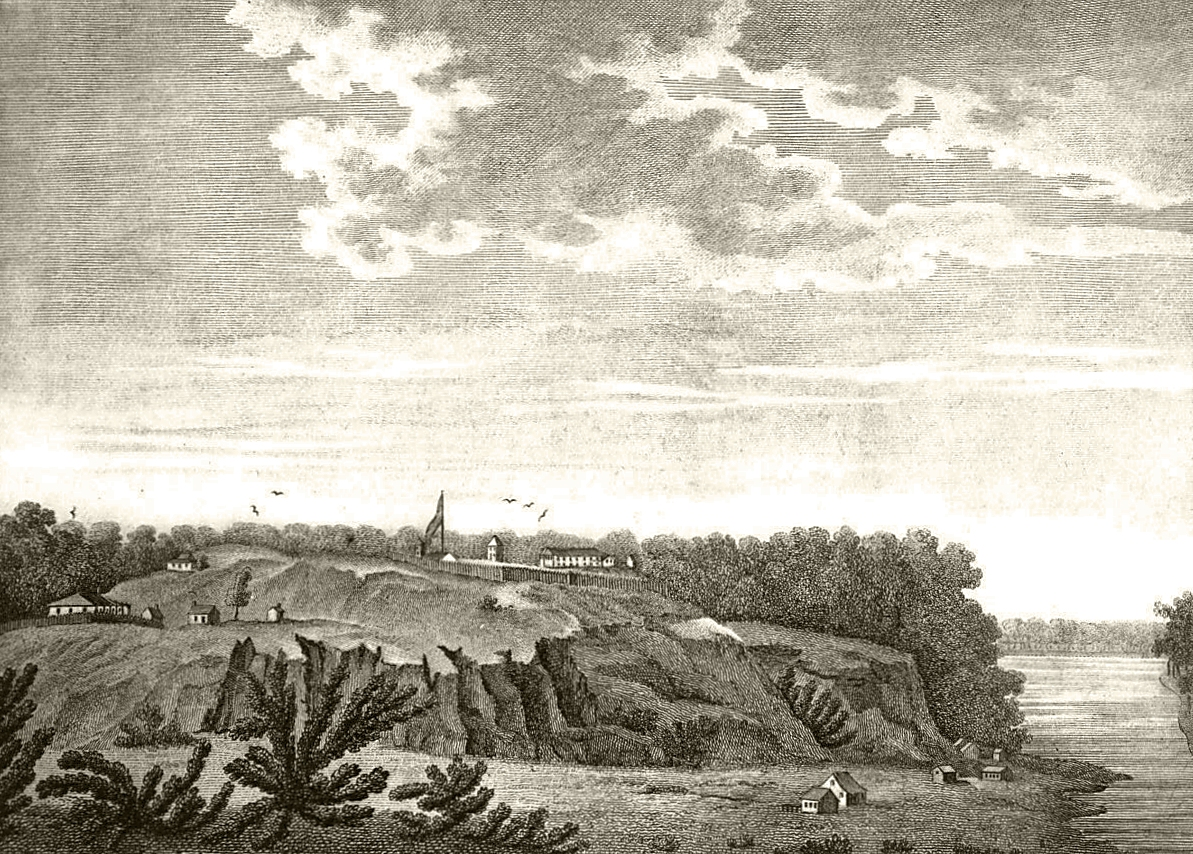
The Natchez District in British West Florida along the Mississippi River where Philip Alston and his brother, John lived from 1772 or 1773 to 1783. Fort Panmure is on the bluff of the city where the pro-American Spanish Army troops were garrisoned.

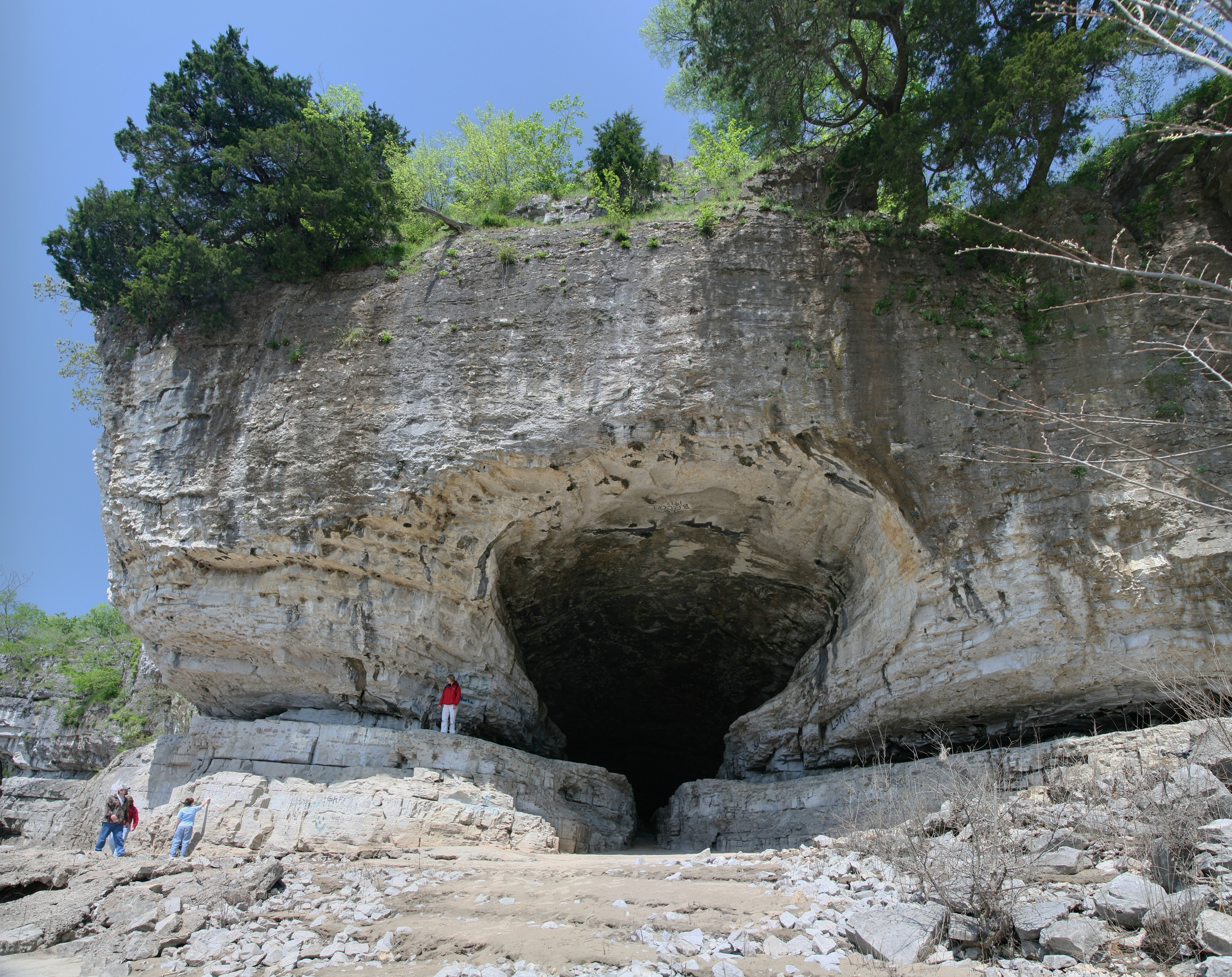
In the 1790s, Philip Alston and his criminal associate, John Duff, carried out their counterfeiting operation at Cave-in-Rock, a relatively secluded site.

Upon arriving in the Natchez District of British West Florida, in 1772 or 1773, Alston became "a prosperous land speculator and wealthy planter, and, in 1776, possessed some of the finest palatial mansions in that gay city." On April 22, 1781, under the overall leadership of John Blommart, Alston, his brother John, and other pro-British Loyalist settlers formed the "Natchez Volunteers". Along with allied Choctaw Indians, they led an uprising in 1783 against Spanish authorities, who officially took possession of British territory in this area of North America that year, under the Treaty of Paris. Soon after they captured Fort Panmure, the rebels split into pro-American and pro-British factions. Alston, his brother, and John Turner wanted to execute the Spanish garrison and raise the American flag. Led by Blommart and Thomas Hutchins, the other side won the argument and sent the garrison away.

Meanwhile, Spanish forces defeated a British attack on Pensacola, which had been intended to relieve the settlers at Natchez. On June 23, 1783, Spanish soldiers retook Fort Panmure without firing a shot, capturing Blommart and John Alston. Other leaders had fled, Hutchins to the Carolinas and Philip Alston to the Cumberland River in Middle Tennessee, where he had already established a second home. Before fleeing Natchez, Alston was reported to have stolen a crucifix from the Catholic Church. Alston is referred to in Spanish records as Phelipe Alston.

== Fort Nashborough, and New Madrid ==
On May 13, 1780, Philip Alston was a signatory, with other settlers, on the Cumberland Compact, a forerunner of the Tennessee State Constitution, at Fort Nashborough, Virginia (now Nashville, Tennessee). This was the first governing document for settlers of the Cumberland Valley. Alston may have been living at Mansker's Station, now Goodlettsville, Tennessee.

Following his escape from New Madrid, Spanish Upper Louisiana Territory, Philip Alston and John Turner joined James Logan Colbert, a Chickasaw leader, and a mixed, roving band of Natchez refugees, Cumberland settlers, and Chickasaw. These numbered about 600 men who were river pirates attacking Spanish shipping on the Mississippi River in 1781 and 1782. The Pennsylvania Gazette, a colonial newspaper, in Philadelphia, reprinted a letter in the fall of 1783 that said Alston was the "famous money counterfeiter" and a leader of the band raiding Spanish shipping on the Mississippi.

Part of a counterfeit coin mold similar to the type used by Philip Alston and his associate John Duff. The coin mold had two halves that would be lined with clay to make an impression of a genuine coin. Molten mixture would be poured into the funnel feeder cut into the side of the mold, and the fake coin later plated with a thin layer of silver. Legitimate coins were made by government mints and stamped from silver or gold coin discs; most counterfeit coins were molded.

The Spanish silver peso was the most common currency found on the American frontier. Alston and Duff were illegally "coining" this type of money at Cave-In-Rock. The "Spanish milled dollar", minted in Mexico, was considered legal tender in the United States until the Coinage Act of 1857.

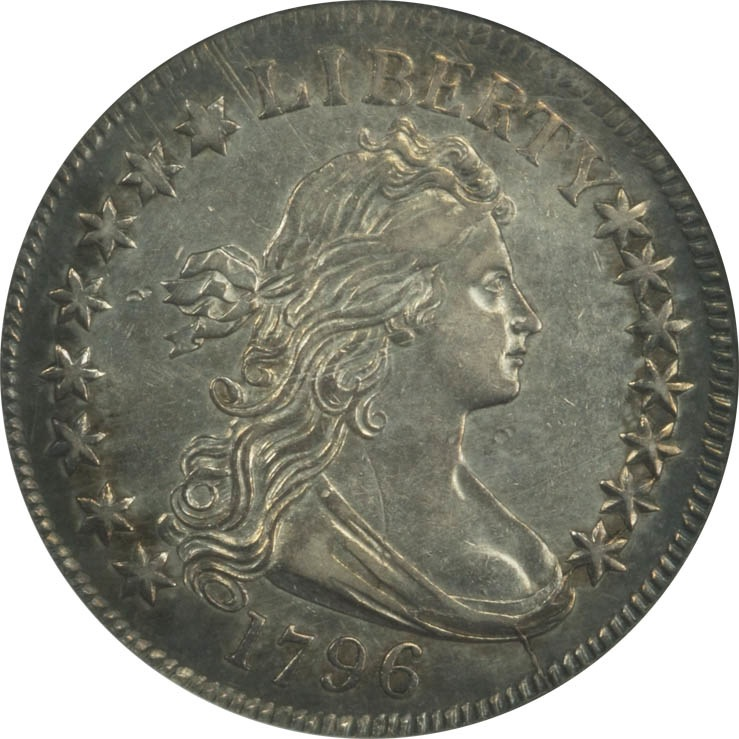
The U.S. half dollar from 1790s was also frequently counterfeited, as it was readily available, easy to carry, and commonly used on the American frontier.

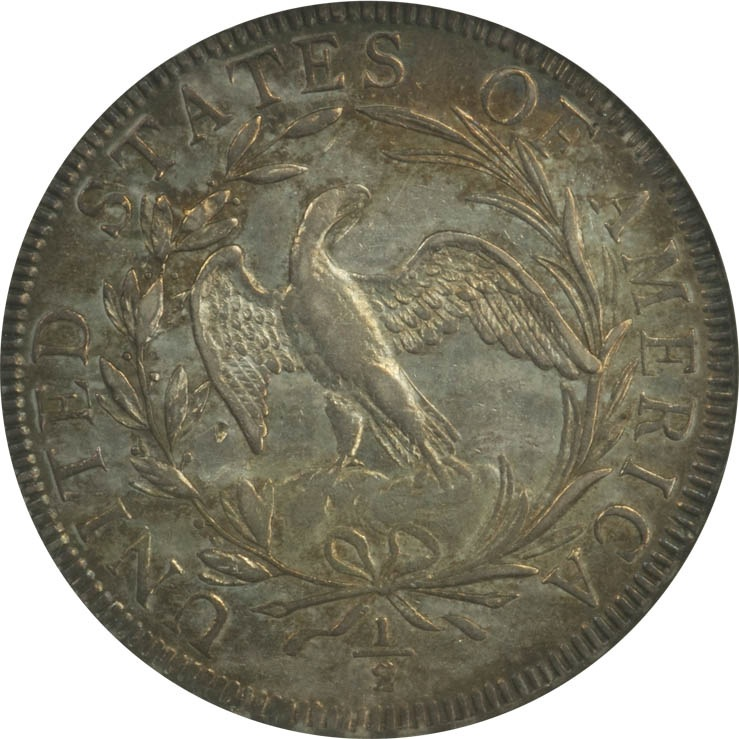
Reverse side of the 1790s U.S. half dollar

== Tennessee, Kentucky, and Cave-In-Rock ==
Around 1783 or, at least, by the summer of 1784, Alston moved northwest from Natchez. He settled in what is now Logan County, Kentucky, in the western part of the state, where he built Alston's Station, or fort, near the Red River. It was downstream of the mouth of the Big Whippoorwill. He farmed in the summer of 1784 and manufactured salt at Moate's Lick that autumn, assisted by old John Stuart. "He traded his salt for skins and then traded the skins off at Natchez or the Eastern States for goods, and he also, became the first merchant. Shortly afterwards, he and James Dromgoole did business together". In 1795, the settlers around Alston's Station included Jesse and William Green, Dromgoole (also spelled Drumgole), and Stuart and Matthew McClean.

Alexander Finley, in his book The History of Russellville and Logan County, Ky (1876), described Alston and his activities: "He fled from Natchez to Kentucky and settled in Logan County, where he established a salt works and store at Moat's Lick. While running these he managed the Cedar House, a tavern near Russellville. He also farmed, preached, and taught school, and incidentally "flooded the country with spurious money." Thus he became, not only the first farmer, manufacturer, and exchange, but he established the first depot of exchange and the first bank, and also the first mint in western Kentucky."

In 1786, Alston began counterfeiting again. Alston and Drumgole celebrated Independence Day that year by kidnapping his former enslaved person, King, who had been sold by Spanish authorities from Alston's estate after he fled Natchez earlier in the decade. Spanish records from Natchez listed Alston as the "robber".

Alston got into trouble for counterfeiting in Logan County, Kentucky, and was banished. In 1789, he moved to the area of Alston's Creek, in northern Logan County but, did not remain there long. Fearing for his safety, Alston moved around often over the next two years. First, he went to Alston's Lick, now in Muhlenberg County, and shortly thereafter, to Livingston County and finally, to Henderson County, all in western Kentucky. In 1790 he crossed the Ohio River to the north into Illinois.

In 1790, Alston was at Cave-in-Rock, Illinois, then a part of Knox County, Northwest Territory, with Duff. Finley wrote that Alston became a "fast friend and disciple of the notorious counterfeiter, Sturdevant". But historian Otto A. Rothert said that Roswell or "Bloody Jack" Sturdivant did not arrive at Cave-in-Rock for at least another generation. "Duff the Counterfeiter", considered notorious during the 1790s, is believed to be the same man who was associated with Alston. According to Finley, Alston soon moved back to Tennessee and from there to Natchez, picking up with former associates.

== Later life ==
Alston was appointed as an empresario in New Madrid, by the governor of the Spanish Louisiana Territory. He was responsible for administering land grants and recruiting new settlers. He died there.

In 1790, Alston was working with James O'Fallon in the Yazoo land scandal, which was intended to settle Americans in southern Mississippi, who would have been aligned with the Spanish. On September 16, 1790, O'Fallon had organized the Yazoo Battalion, a militia to secure the land. Both Alston and Drumgold (Drumgoole) were listed as captains, and John Alston, Philip's brother, was a lieutenant of infantry riflemen.

Alston fades out of American records in the 1790s. On January 22, 1793, he sold goods to his son-in-law, John Gilbert in Logan County, Kentucky. He was recorded in county records on October 22, 1799, to prove another deed involving Gilbert. One account notes that Alston and his son, Peter conducted their counterfeiting operation at Stack Island, in the lower Mississippi River valley about 170 miles upriver from Natchez. This would have been around 1799, at the same time that river pirates were operating from there under the leadership of Samuel Mason, who had been at Cave-in-Rock.

== See also ==
- Moses Austin
- Stephen Austin
- Edward Bonney
- Abel Buell
- Mary Butterworth
- Cave-In-Rock
- Counterfeit money
- Sile Doty
- David Farnsworth
- James Ford
- Catherine Murphy
- John Murrell
- Sturdivant Gang
- Samuel C. Upham
