= Davy Crockett: King of the Wild Frontier =

1955 film by Norman Foster

- Theatrical release poster
- Directed by: Norman Foster
- Written by: Tom Blackburn
- Produced by: Bill Walsh
- Starring: Fess Parker; Buddy Ebsen
- Cinematography: Charles P. Boyle
- Edited by: Chester W. Schaeffer
- Music by: Thomas W. Blackburn (lyrics); George Bruns; Edward H. Plumb (orchestration)
- Production company: Walt Disney Productions
- Distributed by: Buena Vista Film Distribution Co., Inc.
- Release date: May 25, 1955
- Running time: 93 minutes
- Country: United States
- Language: English
- Budget: $7 million
- Box office: $2,150,000 (US)

Davy Crockett: King of the Wild Frontier is a 1955 American Western adventure drama film produced by Walt Disney Productions. It is an edited and recut compilation of the first three episodes of the Davy Crockett television miniseries. The episodes used were Davy Crockett Indian Fighter, Davy Crockett Goes to Congress, and Davy Crockett at the Alamo. The film stars Fess Parker as Davy Crockett.

A prequel, titled Davy Crockett and the River Pirates, was released on July 18, 1956.

== Plot ==
=== Creek Indian Wars ===
Two Tennessee wilderness settlers, Davy Crockett and his best friend George Russell (son of Captain William Russell and Agness H. Mccollough), volunteer to fight with General Andrew Jackson and Major Tobias Norton in the Creek War (1813-1814). They return home after a successful battle, to make sure their families have enough provisions for the winter, rejoining a short time later to find the Americans at a stalemate against the Creeks, with Jackson having gone to New Orleans. Against Norton's orders, Crockett and Russell scout for Creek positions and Russell is captured.

Crockett tracks the Creeks to their camp, where he challenges the remaining Creek chief Red Stick to a tomahawk duel for Russell's life. Crockett wins, but agrees to spare Red Stick's life in exchange for his signing the American peace treaty.

=== Off to Congress ===
Crockett and Russell head west to scout virgin territory being opened for settlement, planning to send for Davy's family once a cabin has been built. They acquire a claim after beating Bigfoot Mason in a shooting contest. They learn that Mason is running Native Americans off their land in order to resell it, and befriend a family of Cherokee refugees Mason has victimized. Crockett offers to become the magistrate for the area. Crockett defeats Mason in hand-to-hand combat before arresting him and his surviving accomplice (the other one having been shot dead when he tried to shoot Crockett).

Crockett is convinced to run for the state legislature against Amos Thorpe, a corrupt politician in league with men trying to claim Cherokee lands, who is running unopposed. He then receives a letter from his sister-in-law telling him that his wife has died of a fever. Crockett wins the election handily and becomes a popular member of the Tennessee General Assembly. He reunites with Norton and Andrew Jackson, who is running for President of the United States and convinces him to run for the United States House of Representatives.

After he enters Congress, Norton, trying to pass a bill to usurp Native American treaty lands, has Crockett embark on a speaking tour across the eastern United States to distract him, but Russell learns of the bill and brings Crockett back to Washington to argue against it. Crockett tears the bill in half before leaving, ending his political career.

=== The Alamo ===
Crockett decides to join the Battle of the Alamo (1836), joined by George Russell. While traveling to San Antonio, they are joined by Thimblerig, a riverboat gambler, and Busted Luck, a Comanche tribesman. Reaching the Alamo, they join its defense, though Colonel James Bowie confides that their supplies are dangerously low. Russell manages to slip through the enemy lines to try to obtain reinforcements from Goliad, Texas. Some days later, Russell return with the news that they won't be receiving help from Goliad. The Texan garrison withstands several attacks from Mexican troops before being overcome. Russell, Thimblerig, Busted Luck, Travis, and a bedridden Colonel Bowie are all killed, leaving Crockett the sole defender standing. Crockett is last seen swinging his rifle against the encroaching Mexicans. The scene then fades to a shot of the Lone Star Flag and Crockett's journal closing on its last entry "March 6, 1836 - Liberty and Independence Forever!", accompanied by the final verse of "The Ballad of Davy Crockett".

== Cast ==
- Fess Parker as Davy Crockett
- Buddy Ebsen as George "Georgie" Russell
- William Bakewell as Tobias Norton
- Basil Ruysdael as Andrew Jackson
- Pat Hogan as Chief Red Stick
- Mike Mazurki as Bigfoot Mason
- Hans Conried as Thimblerig
- Don Megowan as William B. Travis
- Helene Stanley as Polly Crockett
- Kenneth Tobey as James Bowie
- Campbell Brown as Bruno
- Jefferson Thompson as Charlie Two Shirts
- Nick Cravat as Busted Luck
- Jim Maddux as Congressman #1
- Robert Booth as Congressman #2 / Amos Thorpe
- Eugene Brindel as Billy Crockett
- Benjamin Hornbuckle as Henderson
- Henry Joyner as Swaney
- Ray Whitetree as Johnny Crockett
- Hal Youngblood as Opponent of political speaker

== Production ==
Most footage was shot in Tennessee and Wildwood Regional Park in Thousand Oaks, California.

The three segments comprising the film, which originally aired on Walt Disney's Disneyland, were popular enough for Walt Disney to release them theatrically. The film remains Disney's most successful television film project, inspiring two prequel episodes for the television series which were later released in theaters as Davy Crockett and the River Pirates.

== Home Video ==
The film was released on video in 1980, 1985, and 1993. It was released on DVD on Sep 07, 2004. On November 10, 2015, the films were released on Blu-ray on a "60th Anniversary Edition" set through the Disney Movie Club.

== Songs ==
- "The Ballad of Davy Crockett" – lyrics by Tom Blackburn, music by George Bruns, sung by The Wellingtons
- "Farewell to the Mountains" – poem by Davy Crockett, music by George Bruns, sung by Fess Parker

== See also ==
- List of American films of 1955
