= Davy Crockett (miniseries) =

American television series

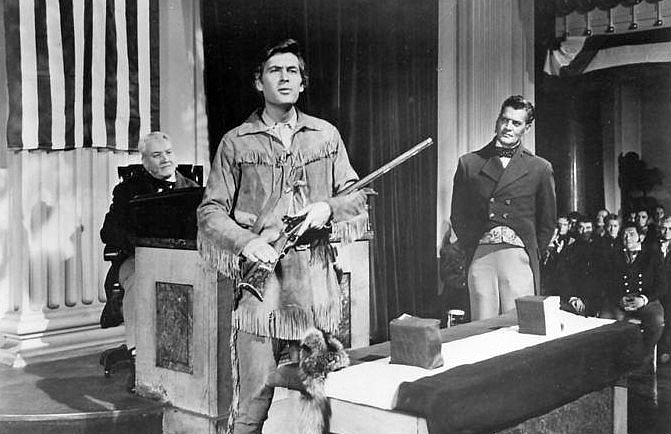
- Crockett Goes to Congress
- Genre: Adventure/Western
- Written by: Norman Foster; Thomas W. Blackburn
- Directed by: Norman Foster
- Starring: Fess Parker; Buddy Ebsen; Jeff York
- Theme music composer: George Bruns; Thomas W. Blackburn (lyrics); Edward H. Plumb (orchestration)
- Country of origin: United States
- Original language: English
- No. of episodes: 5

Production
- Producer: Bill Walsh
- Cinematography: Charles P. Boyle; Bert Glennon
- Production company: Walt Disney Productions

Original release
- Network: ABC
- Release: December 15, 1954 – December 14, 1955

Davy Crockett is a five-part serial that aired on ABC from 1954–1955 in one-hour episodes, on the Disneyland series. The series starred Fess Parker as real-life frontiersman Davy Crockett and Buddy Ebsen as his friend, George Russell. The first three and last two episodes were respectively edited into the theatrical films Davy Crockett, King of the Wild Frontier (released in 1955) and Davy Crockett and the River Pirates (1956). This series and film are known for the theme song, "The Ballad of Davy Crockett".

== Episodes ==
Walt Disney produced weekly one-hour television programs for ABC as part of a deal that allowed him to build the Disneyland theme park. Disney wished to highlight historical figures, and his company developed three episodes on Crockett – "Davy Crockett, Indian Fighter", "Davy Crockett Goes to Congress", and "Davy Crockett at the Alamo", broadcast December 1954–February 1955. They were shot on color film at Great Smoky Mountains National Park at the Mountain Farm Museum adjacent to the Oconaluftee Visitor Center, near Qualla Reservation's entrance; and at Janss Conejo Ranch, California. Crockett's death at the Battle of the Alamo is not actually shown; Crockett, the last survivor in the battle, is seen on the parapet swinging his rifle at the oncoming hordes of Mexican soldiers. The picture fades and the flag of Texas is shown flying in the breeze as the male chorus reprises the last lines of "The Ballad of Davy Crockett". The first three episodes of the serial were edited together as the theatrical film Davy Crockett, King of the Wild Frontier (1955).

Although the historical Crockett perished at the Alamo, two other TV segments followed in November–December 1955: "Davy Crockett's Keelboat Race" and "Davy Crockett and the River Pirates", filmed in Cave-In-Rock, Illinois. These episodes were edited together as the theatrical film Davy Crockett and the River Pirates (1956). Crockett faces off against Mike Fink, another early American legend. In "Davy Crockett and the River Pirates", the men pick up a traveling minstrel (Walter Catlett), who unknown to them is in league with local river bandits. On their way to get horses, from friendly Chickasaw tribesmen, Davy and Georgie are kidnapped by a group of Chickasaws, because white men have been murdering members of their tribe. Crockett and Fink discover that the river pirates led by Samuel Mason, portrayed by Mort Mills, are impersonating Indians.

== Cast ==
Kenneth Tobey, later of the syndicated television adventure series Whirlybirds, starred as Jim Bowie in the "Alamo" segment and then as Jocko in the two later episodes. Future Zorro star George J. Lewis portrayed Chickasaw chief Black Eagle. Thirty-three-year-old Don Megowan was cast as 26-year-old William Travis. Pat Hogan portrayed Chief Red Stick. William Bakewell portrayed Major Tobias Norton and in the final episodes as a keelboat race Master of Ceremonies.

York, Parker, Tobey and Megowan met again as cast members of the 1956 film The Great Locomotive Chase.

== Popularity ==
According to historians Randy Roberts and James Olson, "by the end of the three shows, Fess Parker was very well known, the power of television was fully recognized, and Davy Crockett was the most famous frontiersman in American history".

By the end of 1955, Americans had purchased over $300 million worth of Davy Crockett merchandise, including coonskin caps and bubble gum cards. Fess Parker later claimed he lost millions because a contract granting him a percentage of the merchandising sales was voided, as being with Walt Disney personally rather than Walt Disney Productions.

The shows sparked heated debate, with many questioning whether Crockett was really deserving of the amount of attention that he was receiving. Later writers also questioned the series' historical accuracy. Nevertheless, the shows proved very popular. They were combined into a feature-length movie in the summer of 1955, and Parker and his co-star Buddy Ebsen toured the United States, Europe, and Japan. In the following years, Disney made less successful miniseries based on other historical American heroes including Elfego Baca, Texas John Slaughter, and Francis Marion.

== Awards ==
The miniseries won an Emmy Award for Best Action or Adventure Series in 1956.

== Legacy ==
The Davy Crockett shows were repeated on NBC in the 1960s after Disney had moved his program to that network. The 1960 repeats marked the first time that the programs had actually been shown in color on television.

In 1971 Disneyland renamed their Indian War Canoes ride to Davy Crockett Explorer Canoes in reference to the miniseries, with the guides wearing the Coonskin caps.

The miniseries was released on the Walt Disney Treasures: Davy Crockett - The Complete Televised Series limited tin DVD set on December 4, 2001.

A five-episode 1988–1989 revival was made entitled The New Adventures of Davy Crockett, in which Tim Dunigan took over Fess Parker's role. In addition, Gary Grubbs played George Russel. Johnny Cash played an older Davy in a few scenes set before he went to Texas. The five episodes are listed here:

- Rainbow in the Thunder, November 20, 1988
- A Natural Man, December 18, 1988
- Guardian Spirit, January 13, 1989
- A Letter to Polly, June 11, 1989
- Warrior’s Farewell, June 18, 1989

In 2004, Disney (under its Touchstone Pictures label) revisited the subject of Davy Crockett and the Alamo, with the film The Alamo. The film, however, was a significant box-office failure.

Walt Disney Home Video released the two theatrical films on DVD as Davy Crockett - Two Movie Set, on September 7, 2004. On November 15, 2015, the films were released on Blu-ray on a "60th Anniversary Edition" set through the Disney Movie Club.

== See also ==
- Daniel Boone

== Bibliography ==
- Roberts, Randy; Olson, James S. (2001), A Line in the Sand: The Alamo in Blood and Memory, The Free Press, ISBN 0-684-83544-4
