= Davy Crockett and the River Pirates =

1956 film by Norman Foster

- Theatrical release poster
- Directed by: Norman Foster
- Written by: Tom Blackburn; Norman Foster
- Produced by: Bill Walsh
- Starring: Fess Parker; Buddy Ebsen; Jeff York
- Cinematography: Bert Glennon
- Edited by: Stanley E. Johnson
- Music by: Thomas W. Blackburn (lyrics); George Bruns; Edward H. Plumb (orchestration)
- Color process: Technicolor
- Production company: Walt Disney Productions
- Distributed by: Buena Vista Film Distribution Co., Inc.
- Release date: July 18, 1956
- Running time: 81 minutes
- Country: United States
- Language: English

Davy Crockett and the River Pirates is a 1956 American Western film produced by Walt Disney Productions. A prequel to Davy Crockett: King of the Wild Frontier, it was thought of as a means to salvage revenue from Disney killing off the Davy Crockett character within the three-program arc ending in the Battle of the Alamo, greatly diminishing the value that could have been derived from what surprisingly had exploded into a worldwide phenomenon. The feature film is an edited, repurposed, and recut compilation of the last two episodes of the Davy Crockett television miniseries. Episodes from the miniseries with footage from the film include: "Davy Crockett's Keelboat Race" and "Davy Crockett and the River Pirates". The film stars Fess Parker as Davy Crockett and Buddy Ebsen as Crockett's amiable sidekick George "Georgie" Russell. It tells of an untold story where Davy Crockett and Georgie race against Mike Fink in a keelboat race and deal with a gang of river pirates.

The film was shot in Morganfield, Kentucky. The release takes place prior to the events of the previous film, which consists of the first three episodes of the Davy Crockett miniseries.

== Plot ==
=== Keelboat Race ===
Tennessee frontiersman Davy Crockett and his best friend George "Georgie" Russell are transporting pelts to Maysville, Kentucky, after a successful season of trapping and hunting. On the Ohio River, they encounter Mike Fink, the self-proclaimed "king of the river". Fink refuses to take Crockett and Russell downriver on his keelboat unless they pay his toll, which they cannot afford.

Fink challenges Crockett and Russell to a keelboat race to New Orleans with the pelts and Fink's title as the stakes. Crockett uses his celebrity to organize his own keelboat crew for the race, which he wins, despite numerous obstacles and Fink's cheating. Crockett allows Fink to keep his title, and Fink graciously gives Russell and him a ride downriver for free.

=== River Pirates ===
Fink drops Crockett and Russell off along the river where they seek out Chickasaw traders from whom to buy horses. A Chickasaw hunting party captures them and takes them to their village, where they are preparing to go to war against white men for murdering Kaskaskia tribesmen. Crockett and Russell, having witnessed an earlier attack on Fink's keelboat but being told the Kaskaskia were driven out of the area prior, deduce that the attackers are in fact river pirates masquerading as Native Americans. Crockett and Russell agree to bring the pirates to justice in exchange for peace and are released.

Fink agrees to help Crockett and Russell by posing as a banker hauling Spanish gold and stopping at various towns along the Ohio River to brag to draw the pirates out. The group attracts a traveling minstrel named Colonel Plug, whom Crockett agrees to take to the next town. Crockett correctly suspects Plug is in league with the river pirates, led by Samuel Mason and the Harpe brothers, who are hiding at Cave-in-Rock. Plug notifies the river pirates of the gold through song, but is subdued when he discovers the ruse. The pirates attack, but Fink's crew defends the boat successfully. Crockett and Russell pursue Mason and the Harpe brothers to their cave hideout, where they subdue the Harpe brothers. A keg of gunpowder explodes, sealing the cave and killing Mason.

Having made peace with the local Indians, Crockett and Russell again part ways with Fink and head for home.

== Cast ==
- Fess Parker as Davy Crockett
- Buddy Ebsen as George "Georgie" Russell
- Jeff York as Mike Fink
- Kenneth Tobey as Jocko
- Clem Bevans as Captain Cobb
- Irvin Ashkenazy as Moose
- Mort Mills as Samuel Mason
- Paul Newlan as Big Harpe
- Frank Richards as Little Harpe
- Hank Worden as Fiddler
- Dick Crockett as Ben
- Troy Melton as Hank
- Walter Catlett as Colonel Plug
- Douglass Dumbrille as Saloon owner (uncredited)
- William Bakewell as Keelboat Race Master of Ceremonies (uncredited)
- William Fawcett as Old Timer with Livestock (uncredited)
- George J. Lewis as Chief Black Eagle (uncredited)

== Songs ==
- "The Ballad of Davy Crockett" – lyrics by Tom, music by George, sung by the Griffin Family
- "King of the River" – lyrics by Tom, music by Bruns, sung by Jeff
- "Yaller, Yaller Gold" – lyrics by Blackburn, music by Bruns, sung by Walter Wellington

== Theatrical release ==
"Man in Space" was edited into a featurette to play in theaters, accompanying "Davy Crockett and the River Pirates".

== Reception ==
Common Sense Media has given it a 3 out of 5 stars.

== Home video ==
The film was released on video in 1981, 1985, and 1994. It was released on DVD on Sep 07, 2004. On November 10, 2015, the films were released on Blu-ray on a "60th Anniversary Edition" set through the Disney Movie Club.
