= Cave-In-Rock =

Cave-In-Rock may refer to:

- Cave-In-Rock, Illinois
- Cave-in-Rock State Park
