= Old Greenville, Mississippi =

Ghost town in Jefferson County, Mississippi, United States

- Ghost town
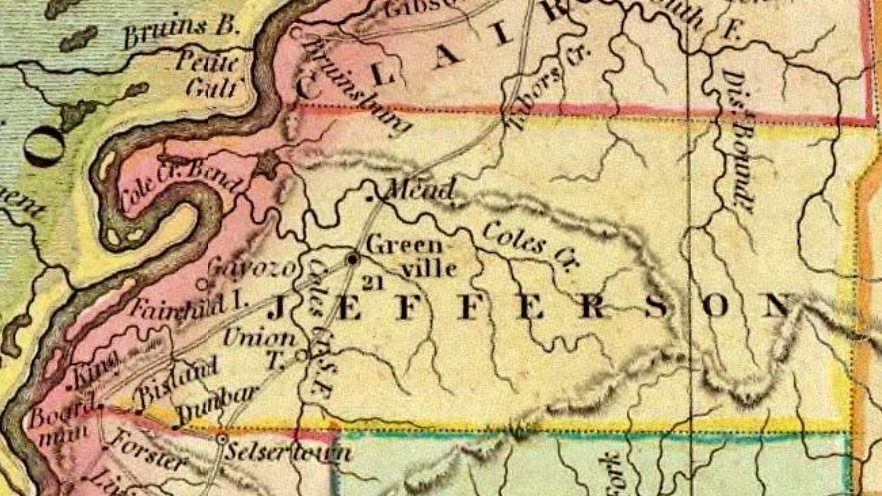
- 1823 map of Jefferson County, Mississippi (David Rumsey Map Collection 5388.022)

- Location within Mississippi Location within the United States
- Coordinates: 31°44′47″N 91°08′24″W
- Country: United States
- State: Mississippi
- County: Jefferson
- Time zone: UTC-6 (Central (CST))
  - Summer (DST): UTC-5 (CDT)
- GNIS feature ID: 1782013

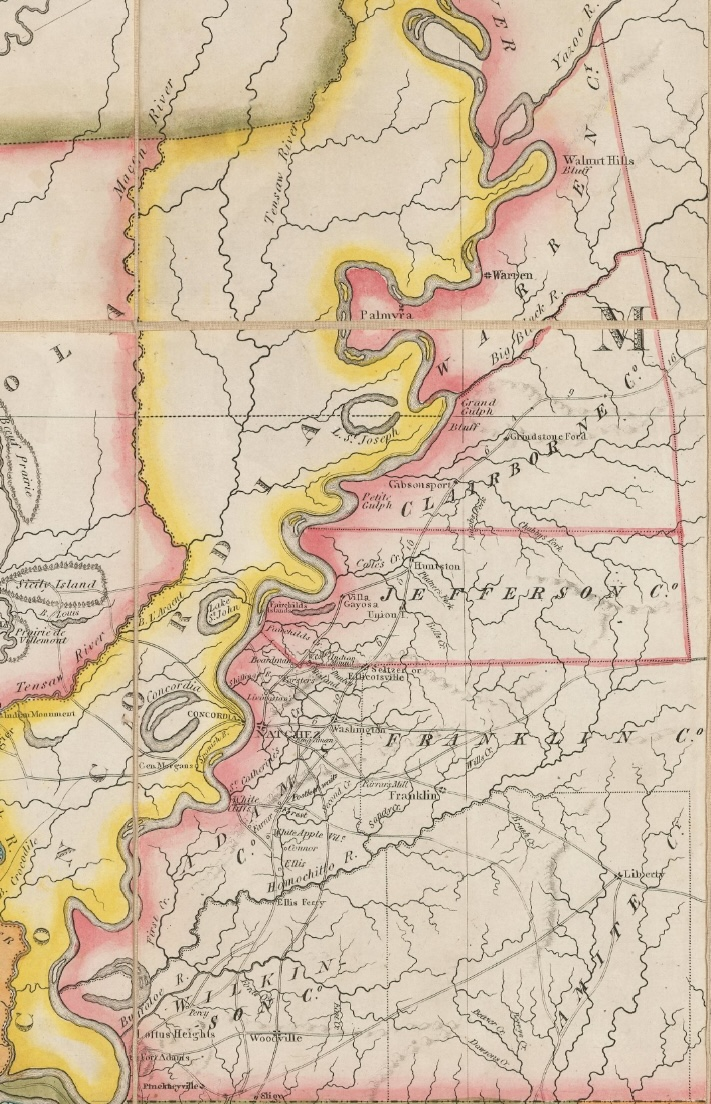
Map shows Greenville with an earlier name of Huntston. The Old Natchez Trace runs south out of Huntston. Villa Gayoso was near Cole's Creek.

Old Greenville is an extinct settlement and the county seat, from 1802 until 1825, of Jefferson County, Mississippi, United States. The town was located along the old Natchez Trace and was once the largest town along the Trace. Nothing exists at the site today except the town's cemetery.

== History ==
Old Greenville was located on Coles Creek, approximately 28 mi (45 km) northeast of Natchez. The area around Old Greenville was settled prior to 1798 and was originally known as Greenbay in honor of a local landowner, Henry Green. The name was legally changed to Greenville in 1805. It was also known as Huntley or Huntston, in honor of Abijah Hunt, who operated a store and the first cotton gin in Jefferson County in the area. The landmarks of the town in early days were "Cable's Tavern and Hunt's store." According to one history, "Abijah Hunt was the pioneer of the Hunt family. The upper part of old Greenville was called Huntley, after him. He was a merchant there and erected the first gin in the county, to which all the surrounding planters resorted with their cotton. He fell in a duel with George Poindexter in 1811, and as he was a bachelor, his nephew, David Hunt, inherited his stores and gin and subsequently amassed a large fortune." In 1803, multiple landowners (including Ferdinand Claiborne), donated land that became part of the town of Greenville, named in honor of General Nathanael Greene. In 1807 a traveler described it as "a small but handsome village situated on Coles Creek at the distance of 26 miles from the City of Natchez and 20 from Washington." Other early names for the settlement included Greenbay, Orchardsville, Pickerington, and Odoms.

Old Greenville became the county seat of Jefferson County and remained the county seat until it was moved to Fayette in 1825. According to one account "The general assembly of Mississippi passed an act on the first day of February, 1825, authorizing the selection of a location for the seat of justice for Jefferson county. A place to be called Fayette, in honor of Gen. Lafayette, who was then the guest of the United States, was chosen. Greenville had been a favorite in this election, but the night before it took place a mob wrecked the court house."

Andrew Jackson allegedly married Rachel Jackson in 1791 at the home of Thomas Green near Old Greenville.

After being captured in 1803, the highwayman Samuel Mason was shot while trying to escape. Two of his gang members, Peter Alston and Wiley Harpe, attempted to bring his head in to claim the bounty that Governor William C. C. Claiborne had placed on Mason. Alston and Harpe were recognized, captured, and hung in Old Greenville.

Old Greenville was at one point home to a large number of men who would hold important roles in the future state of Mississippi. David Hunt and George Poindexter both owned plantations near Old Greenville. According to a 1904 history of Old Greenville, "Courts were held on the fourth Mondays of April and October of each year. It grew to be a town of several hundred inhabitants, was the center of the intelligence and wealth of the county at that time. Gov. David Holmes lived on his plantation on Coles Creek, about two miles west, and Governor Cowles Mead on Chubby's Fork [of Bayou Pierre], four miles north. Cato West, Territorial Secretary, and at one time acting Governor, lived, died and was buried on his plantation, Sunshine, on Coles Creek." Joseph Emory Davis, older brother of Jefferson Davis, practiced law in Old Greenville and Natchez. While his elder brother lived in Old Greenville, Jefferson Davis spent summers on his plantation. General Thomas Hinds spent a large part of his life in Old Greenville, where he "owned a farm Home Hill, one mile and a half south of Greenville on the Stampley town road, where he was quietly leading the life of a farmer" until the Creek War broke out. He died there in 1840. Other notable residents included John M. Whitney, Dr. John H. Duncan, Robert Cox and Frank A. Montgomery.

The English travel writer Fortescue Cuming, visited Old Greenville in 1808 and wrote that the community consisted of forty houses (many unoccupied), a small church, courthouse, two stores, two taverns, drug store, a prison, and a pillory.

A post office operated under the name Greenville from 1803 to 1834.

There was a racetrack near what is now East Fayette on land that had been owned at one time by the Platner family.

== Decline ==
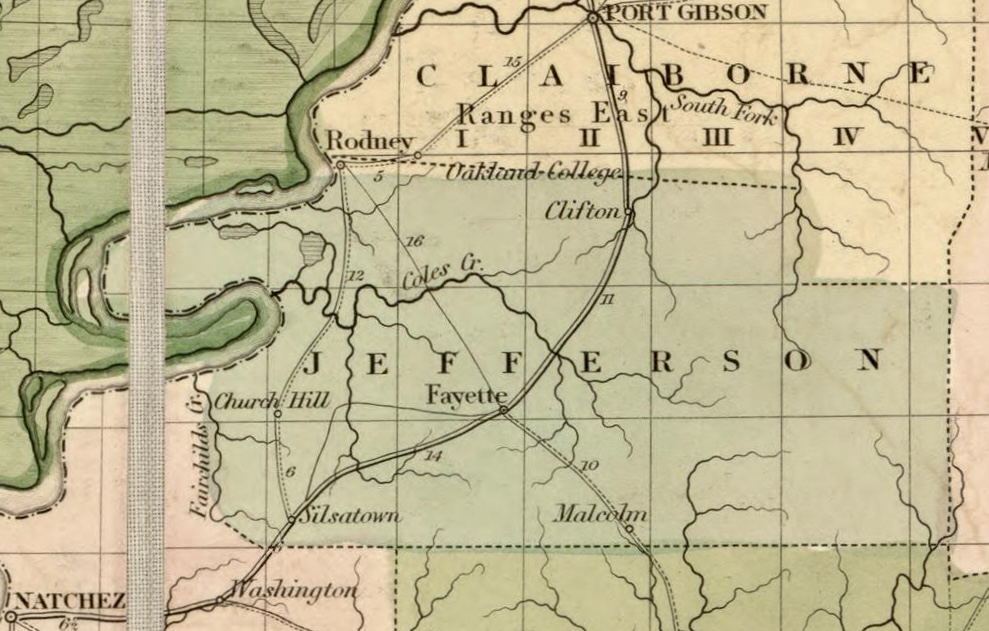
Greenville did not warrant inclusion on a map of Jefferson County, Mississippi printed in 1839

After the county seat was moved, Old Greenville rapidly declined. By 1835, the main street was bordered by dilapidated houses and the town was practically abandoned. In 1849 a local historian commented that Greenville "was the seat of justice, and was the head quarters of the first lawyers and physicians, of the State—men who subsequently distinguished themselves at the bar, in the halls of Congress and in the Senate of the United States. It was a beautiful village, and continued to be a place of some note, until the courthouse was removed to Fayette, in 1825. It then sunk to rise no more, and is now so wholly deserted that the traveler often pauses at McCullum's blacksmith shop to enquire the distance to Greenville."

The last remaining building in Old Greenville was "the ancient Cable Hotel," which burned down around 1890. The last surviving evidence of settlement was a cistern that survived into the 1970s at what had once been a homesite.

A historical marker describing the community is located near Fayette, Mississippi, on Mississippi Highway 553 six miles west of U.S. Route 61.

== See also ==
- List of ghost towns in Mississippi
