= Stack Island (Mississippi River) =

Island in Mississippi River between Louisiana and Mississippi

- Interactive map of Stack Island

Geography
- Location: Mississippi River, Issaquena County, Mississippi, United States
- Coordinates: 32.8°N 91.1°W
- Length: 6 mi (10 km)
- Highest elevation: 95 ft (29 m)

Administration
- United States
- State: Mississippi
- County: Issaquena

Demographics
- Population: (0)

Location of Stack Island in Issaquena County, Mississippi

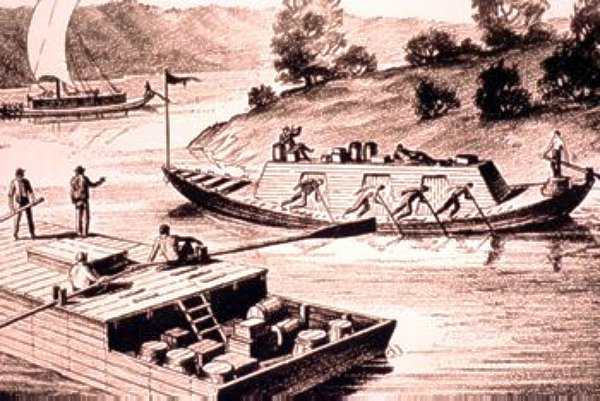
River pirates at Diamond Island preyed on the Mississippi River flatboats, keelboats, and rafts, as profitable targets of goods, attacking the crews and pioneers who were easily overwhelmed and killed.

Part of a counterfeit coin mold similar to the type used by counterfeiters on Stack Island. The coin mold consisted of two metal halves that would be lined with clay to make an impression of a genuine coin, then molten lead would be poured into the mold, and the fake lead coin would be plated with a layer of silver. Legitimate coins were made by government mints that stamped them from silver or gold coin discs as most inferior counterfeit coins were usually molded.

Stack Island, also known as Crow's Nest and Island No. 94, is located in Issaquena County, Mississippi, in the Mississippi River, near Lake Providence, Louisiana and nearly 200 miles north of New Orleans.

== History ==
Beginning, in the late 1790s, the island became associated with river pirates and counterfeiting. Outlaws associated with Stack Island include; Samuel Mason, Little Harpe, and father and son counterfeiters Philip and Peter Alston.

Island No. 94, or Stack Island, or, as it is sometimes called, "Crow's Nest." 170 miles above Natchez, was notorious for many years as a den for the rendezvous of horse thieves, counterfeiters, robbers, and murderers. It was a small island in the middle of "Nine Mile Reach." From thence they would sally forth, stop passing boats, murder the crew, or, if this seemed impracticable, would buy their horses, slaves, flour, whisky, etc., and pay for them.

In 1809, the last major river pirate activity, on the Upper Mississippi River, came to an abrupt end, when a group of flatboatmen, meeting at the head of the "Nine Mile Reach," decided to make a raid on Stack Island and wipe out the river pirates. They attacked at night, a battle ensued, and two of the boatmen and several outlaws were killed. The attackers captured 19 other men, a 15-year-old boy and two women. The women and teenager were allowed to leave. The remaining outlaws are presumed to have been executed.

The floods of 1811 and 1813, along with the 1811–12 New Madrid earthquakes, all but swept away the island leaving only a low sandbar. From the 1820s-mid-1830s, John A. Murrell, the west Tennessee bandit, may have operated on the Mississippi River, not far from Stack Island.
