= Peter Alston =

American outlaw (died 1804)

- Born: After 1765 but before 1770; United States
- Died: February 8, 1804 (aged 35-38); Old Greenville, Jefferson County, Mississippi Territory
- Cause of death: Execution by hanging
- Other names: James May, Samuel May, Isaac May
- Occupations: River pirate, horse thief, burglar, highwayman, counterfeiter
- Known for: Associating with serial-killer Wiley "Little" Harpe, and a member of the outlaw Mason Gang
- Father: Philip Alston

Peter Alston (after 1765 – February 8, 1804) was an American counterfeiter, horse thief, highwayman, and river pirate of the late 18th and early 19th centuries. He is believed to have been an associate of serial killer Little Harpe, and a member of the notorious Mason Gang.

== Early life and family ==
Peter Alston was born in the 1700s, the son of infamous colonial-era counterfeiter Philip Alston, who was associated with notable outlaw lairs at Cave-in-Rock, Illinois, and Natchez, Mississippi. His father had three wives: Mildred McCoy (Peter's mother), Temperance Smith, and Mary Molly Temple. Alston had two brothers, Philip, Jr. and John McCoy, and two sisters, Frances and Elizabeth Elise. His paternal grandparents were Solomon Alston and Sarah Ann "Nancy" Hinton Alston. His paternal uncle, John Alston, was also a counterfeiter.

The Alston family had its origins in the British Royal colony of the Province of South Carolina, where the Alston surname was very common. There is scant information on his childhood and pre-criminal activities. His possible birthplaces include South Carolina, North Carolina, Virginia, Natchez, West Florida (now Natchez, Mississippi), Fort Nashborough, Virginia (now Nashville, Tennessee), or Russellville, Virginia (now Russellville, Kentucky). The family probably moved frequently to avoid pursuit from the law.

== Criminal activities ==
According to Alex C. Finley, in The History of Russellville and Logan County, Ky, Peter Alston used the alias "James May". Alston also used the aliases Samuel May and Isaac May.

The earliest recorded use of the James May alias dates back to around 1797 or 1798 in Red Banks, Kentucky (now Henderson, Kentucky) where Alston appeared with a woman who claimed to be his sister and was ostensibly lame. This woman could have been one of his two sisters, Francis or Elizabeth Elise. While in Red Banks, Alston stole horses, but he was caught in Vincennes, Northwest Territory (now Vincennes, Indiana), and brought back for trial. He broke out of jail the first night he was incarcerated and was never tried.

In the summer of 1799 regulators cleaned the frontier criminal element out of western Kentucky and Cave-in-Rock, Northwest Territory (now Cave-in-Rock, Illinois). Alston, gang leader Samuel Mason and Peter's father Philip all moved to Stack Island on the lower Mississippi River. Alston cast counterfeit silver coins there, as well as taking part in river piracy operations.

== Arrest, escape, and execution ==
According to Spanish colonial court records, Spanish government officials arrested Samuel Mason and his men, early in 1803, at the Little Prairie settlement, now Caruthersville, in southeastern Missouri. Mason and his gang, including his family members, were taken to the Spanish colonial government in New Madrid, Spanish Upper Louisiana Territory, along the Mississippi River, where a three-day hearing was held to determine whether Mason was truly involved in river piracy, as he had been formally accused of this crime.

Although Mason claimed he was simply a farmer who had been maligned by his enemies, the presence of $7,000 in currency and twenty human scalps found in his baggage convinced the Spanish he indeed was a river pirate. Mason and his family were taken under armed guard to New Orleans, where the Spanish colonial governor ordered them handed over to the American authorities in the Mississippi Territory, as all crimes they had been convicted of appeared to have taken place in American territory or against American river boats.

While being transported up the Mississippi River, Samuel Mason and gang members Wiley Harpe and Alston overpowered their guards and escaped, with Mason being shot in the head during the escape. One of the 1803 accounts {Rothert. p. 247} claimed Captain Robert McCoy, the commandant of New Madrid, was killed by Mason during their escape. McCoy actually died in 1840, and was neither crippled nor killed by Mason.

American territorial governor William C. C. Claiborne immediately issued a reward for their recapture, prompting Harpe and Alston to bring Mason's head in an attempt to claim the reward money. Whether they killed Mason or whether he died from his wound suffered in the escape attempt has never been established. Setton and May were recognized and identified as wanted criminals, Harpe and Alston were arrested, tried in U.S. federal court, found guilty of piracy, and hanged in Old Greenville, Jefferson County, Mississippi Territory in early 1804.

== Gallery ==
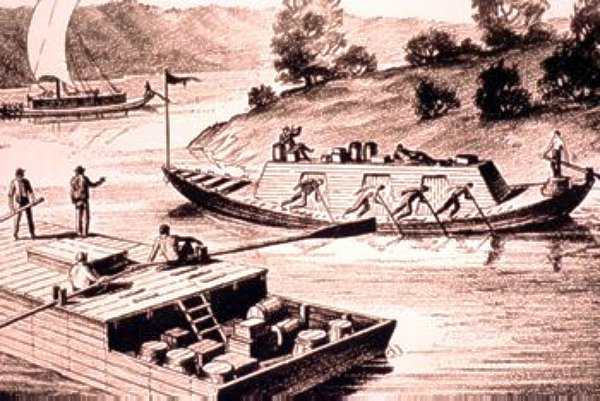
While on the Ohio River and later the Mississippi, Peter Alston joined Samuel Mason and his gang of river pirates, chose flatboats, keelboats, and rafts, as profitable targets, to attack, because of the valuable and plentiful cargo on board.

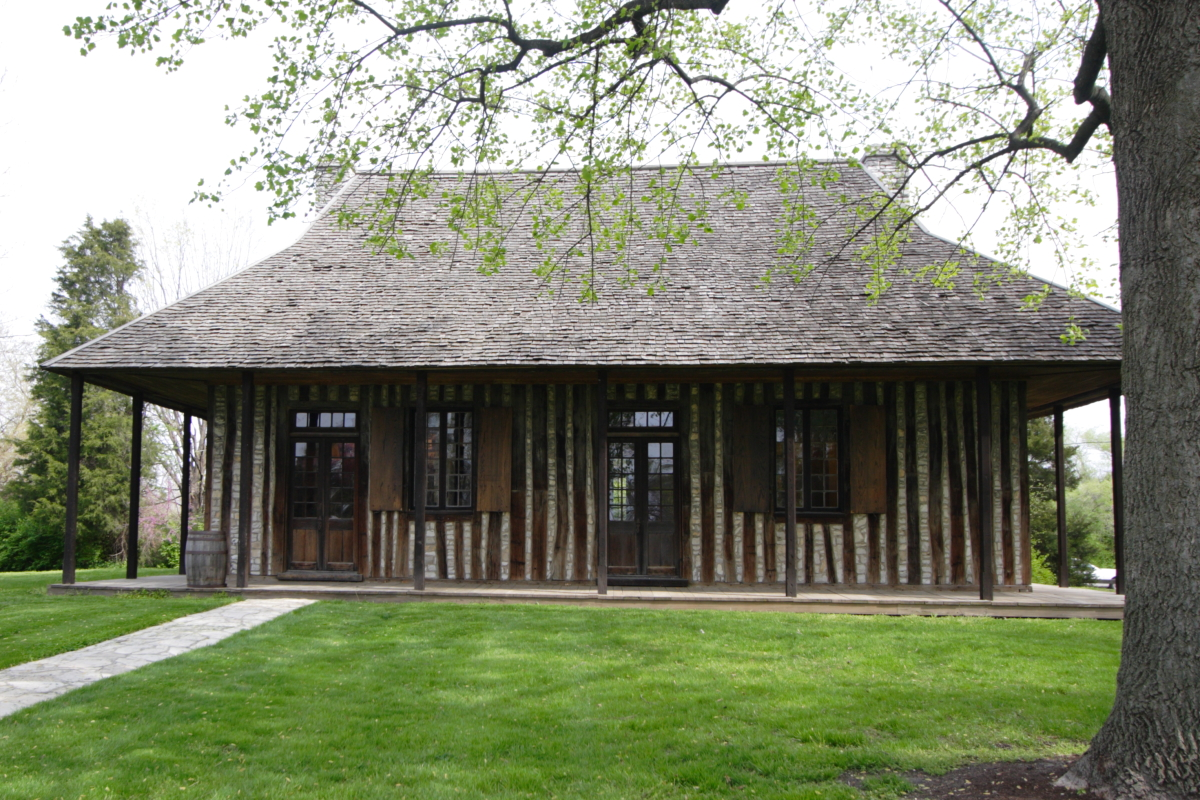
Peter Alston along with Wiley "Little" Harpe were captured with the Samuel Mason Gang, in 1803, and brought before the Spanish Territorial commandant, Colonel Robert McCoy, in New Madrid, Spanish Upper Louisiana Territory, New Spain The courtroom would have been small and simple, like the Old Cahokia Courthouse, in Cahokia, Illinois Country, Northwest Territory (pictured).

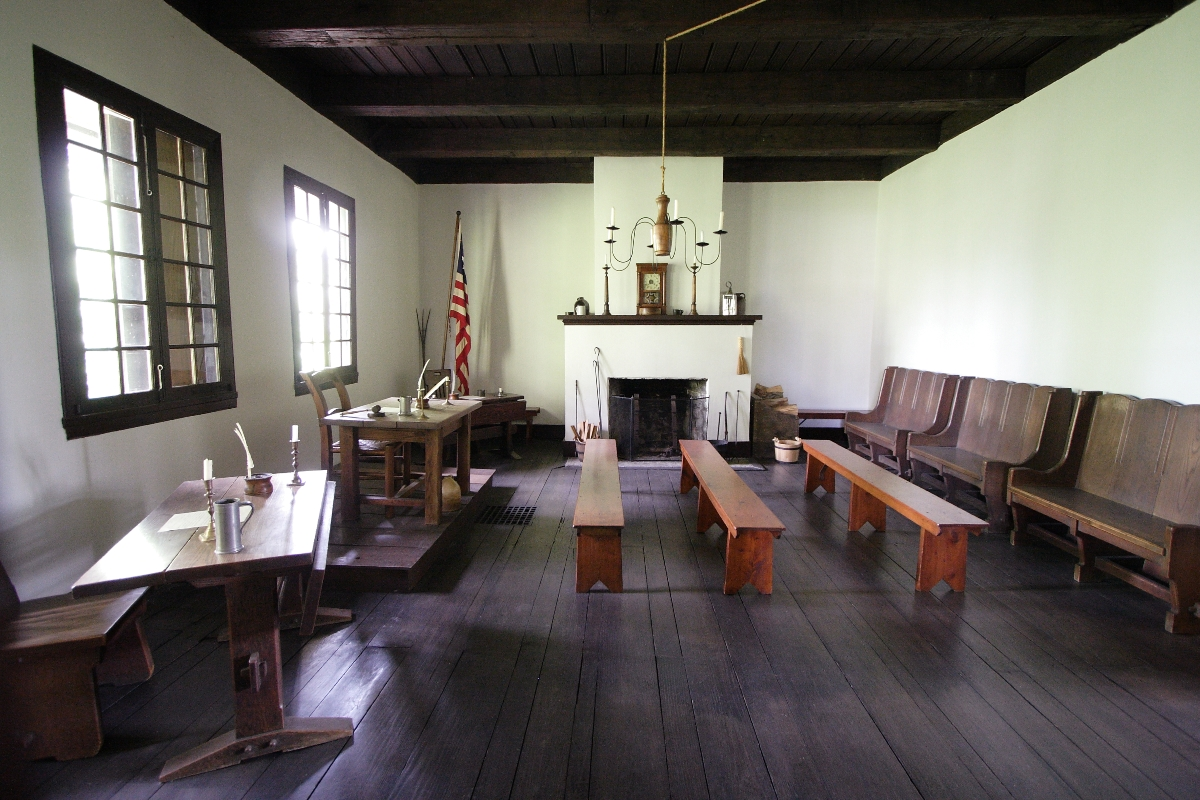
When Peter Alston, Wiley "Little" Harpe, and the Samuel Mason Gang, received their hearing in the Spanish colonial court of New Madrid, the frontier courtroom may not have been much bigger than the courtroom of the Old Cahokia Courthouse (pictured).

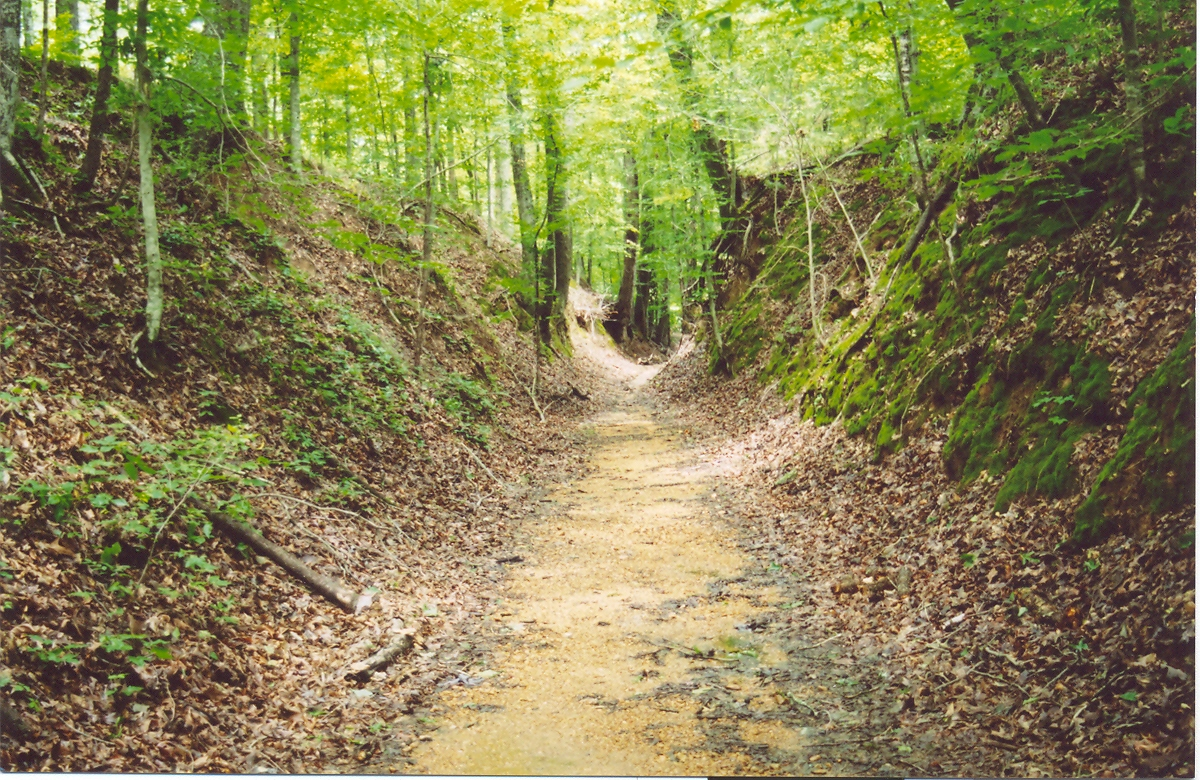
The old path of the "Natchez Trace", where, between 1799 and 1803, Peter Alston, Wiley "Little" Harpe and the Samuel Mason Gang committed highway robbery and murder against unsuspecting travelers.

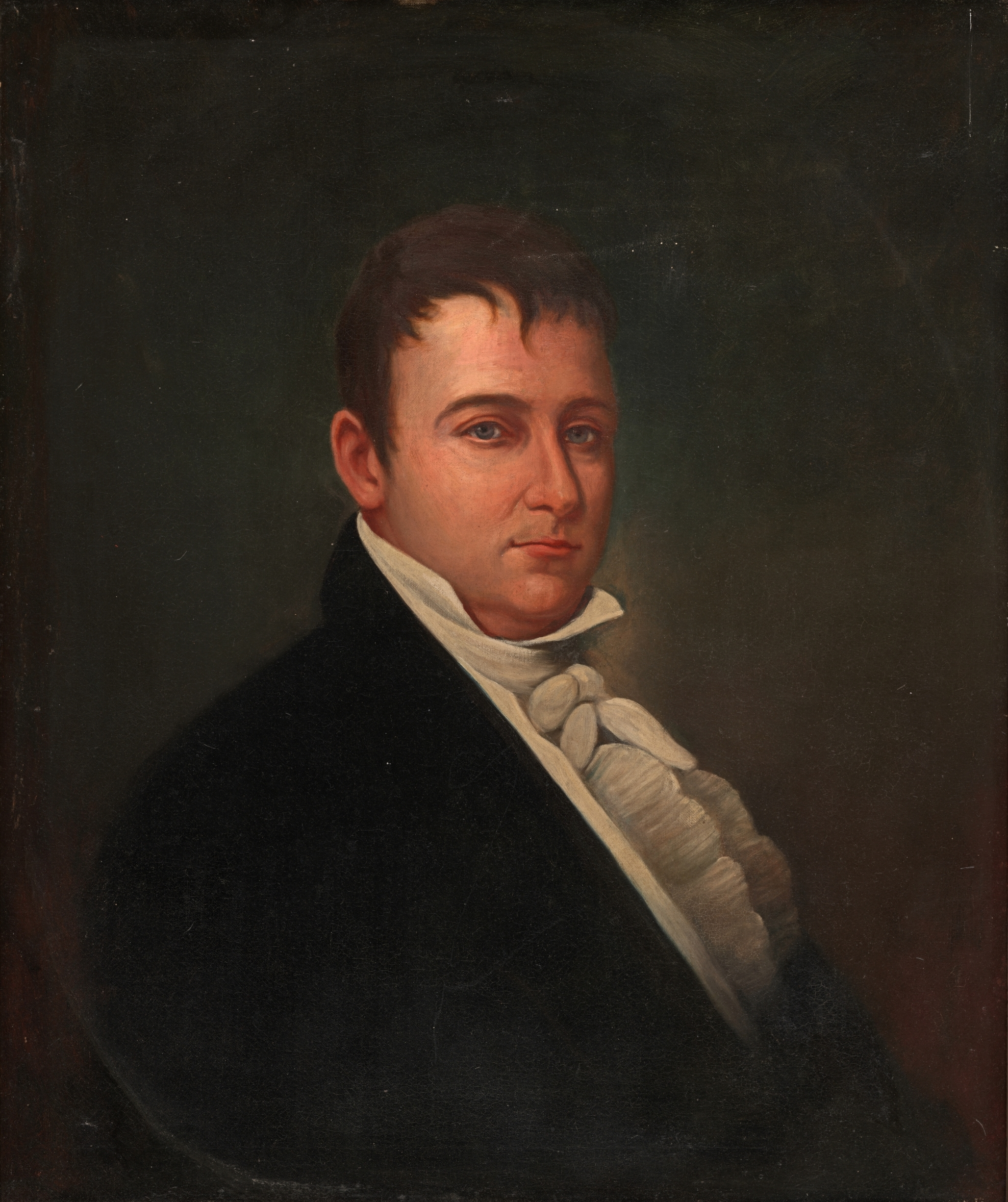
In 1803, Mississippi Territorial governor, William C. C. Claiborne (pictured), offered a $2,000 reward, a very large sum of money, at the time, for the capture or severed head of Samuel Mason. Peter Alston and Wiley "Little" Harpe brought in the head of Mason to collect the reward and were identified and hanged.
