= The Wellingtons (folk group) =

American singing group

- Also known as: The Lincolns
- Origin: United States
- Genres: Folk Music
- Years active: 1958–1971
- Labels: Kapp, Disneyland, Buena Vista, Ascot, Capitol
- Past members: George Patterson; Kirby Johnson; Ed Wade

The Wellingtons was a singing group that performed the title songs for several television programs in the 1950s and 1960s, including Gilligan's Island and Davy Crockett. The group also appeared regularly on the televised music show Shindig!.

The Wellingtons were founded by George Patterson, Ed Wade, and Kirby Johnson. The group, originally called the Lincolns, recorded for Kapp Records. After changing its name, the Wellingtons were signed by Walt Disney to record the theme song for Disney's The Wonderful World of Color. For Disneyland Records, the group recorded numerous theme songs, including The Ballad of Davy Crockett for the mini-series Davy Crockett. The Wellingtons can be heard singing the tune in the soundtrack of the movie Fantastic Mr. Fox.

Gilligan's Island producer Sherwood Schwartz had his pilot episodes rejected twice. Before resubmitting a reworked pilot, he decided to use a new theme song. Working with composer George Wyle he developed a folk song that told the back story of the castaways, and hired The Wellingtons to sing it. The song was a hit. The Wellingtons appear in a second season (1965–66) episode as a rock group called the Mosquitoes. The insect-named moniker is a play on The Beatles, and the members of the fictitious group are Bingo, Bango, Bongo and Irving in a reverse play on the names John, Paul, George and Ringo.

The Wellingtons appeared as regulars on the variety television show Shindig! and served as backup singers for performers on the show.

They also provided studio backing vocals on recordings by such artists as Annette Funicello, Jan and Dean, and others.

The group traveled with actor Donald O'Connor for six and a half years and toured with The Supremes and Stevie Wonder. The final member of the group still living is founder Ed Wade, who is an attorney formerly licensed in California from 1972 until 2023. Kirby Johnson died in 1999 and Patterson in 2015.
