= Tom W. Blackburn =

American novelist

- Born: Thomas Wakefield Blackburn; June 23, 1913; Raton, New Mexico, U.S.
- Died: August 2, 1992 (aged 79); Glenwood Springs, Colorado, U.S.
- Occupations: Writer; screenwriter; lyricist
- Writing career
- Genre: Western fiction

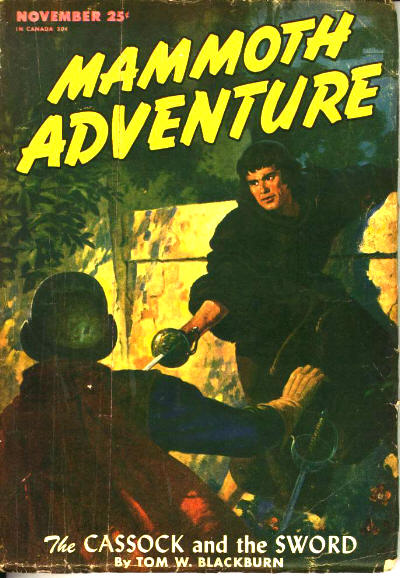
Blackburn's short story "The Cassock and the Sword" was the cover story for the November 1946 issue of Mammoth Adventure

Thomas Wakefield Blackburn (June 23, 1913 – August 2, 1992) was an American author, screenwriter and lyricist. His work included various Western novels and television screenplays, as well as the lyrics to "The Ballad of Davy Crockett" (his first) and other songs.

In the mid 1950s Blackburn worked in the story department at Walt Disney's studio and it was there, in addition to working on the Davy Crockett films and teleplays (among other projects), that he also began composing lyrics. Among his most successful efforts are "The Ballad of Davy Crockett" and "Farewell" for that series and "Johnny Tremain" and "The Liberty Tree" for Johnny Tremain (Buena Vista, 1957).

== Biography ==
Born the eldest of six children on the T.O. Ranch near Raton, New Mexico, to Howard and Edith "Didi" (née Herrington) Blackburn. His father worked for the O'Shaunnessy Engineering Company as an engineer and was sent to the ranch to install an irrigation system. The T.O. Ranch had its own internal railroad and was used in Blackburn's novel Raton Pass.

After the irrigation system was installed the family moved to La Salle, Colorado (where Edith's father had a farm), and Howard Blackburn tried farming, then dry farming, several other jobs-including town marshal, and (with the help of financing from his father) opening a Ford Motor Company automotive dealership. After this failed, he got more help from his father and Howard took insurance classes in Denver and then became successful working for the Federal Surety Company in Denver. The family moved to Denver when Tom was in the fourth grade. Howard Blackburn was then put in charge of monitoring construction jobs for Federal Surety where the insurance company had bonded the contractor. If the contractor failed to complete the project, Federal Surety would finish the contract with Howard in charge. Tom was put to work in menial jobs during the summer time at the various construction sites that his father was supervising.

When Tom was older he helped his Uncle Cecil, who was in the produce business, pickup fresh vegetables from area farms. For a time the family lived in Lander, Wyoming, and then they moved to Glendale, California. Tom's mother was a writer of juvenile poetry, pulp fiction, and juvenile Westerns. He cites his mother as one of his literary influences.

Blackburn attended Glendale Junior College and U.C.L.A. While at Glendale Junior College he met (Hazel) Juanita Alsdorf, and they were married in Glendale on July 6, 1937. They had three children: daughter, Stephanie Jean Blackburn and sons Thomas Wakefield Blackburn III and Gary Keeling Blackburn (Gary was adopted, the biological son of Juanita's sister).

After he left college, Blackburn became a "ghost writer" for pulp fiction authors Harry F. Olmsted and Ed Earl Repp, what he called "pulpeteering". When he left Olmsted and Repp, and moved to Santa Monica, he was replaced by Frank Bonham. To make ends meet he took a job at the local gas company.

Blackburn stayed employed at the gas company until he could make his freelancing pulp career cover the bills reliably. Fiction under his own name appeared regularly in the western pulps from 1940 to 1952. His main market was Popular Publications, in magazines like 10-Story Western, Star Western, and Dime Western Magazine. He also wrote a few adventures stories in, for example, Short Stories. Blackburn also wrote stories under the pseudonyms of Steve Herrington, and the Popular Publications house names Ray P. Shotwell and Dave Sands.

His cousin, John Thomas "Tommy" Blackburn was a squadron commander with The Jolly Rogers (United States Navy Aircraft Squadron VF-61) in the Pacific Theater during World War II, and author of the book The Jolly Rogers about the squadron.

== Works ==
=== Novels ===
- Tumbleweed with Spurs (1940)
- Range War (1949)
- Raton Pass (1950) (novel & screenplay)
- Short Grass (1950) (novel & screenplay)
- Broken Arrow Range (1951)
- Navajo Canyon (1953)
- Sierra Baron (1955)
- Buckskin Man (1958)
- A Good Day to Die (1967)
- Compañeros (1978)
- The Trail of Whitened Skulls (2006) (collected works)

Stanton Saga Series:

- Yanqui (1973)
- Ranchero (1974)
- El Segundo (1974)
- Patron (1976)

=== Television series and screenplays ===
- Killer at Large (1947) (screenplay)
- Colt .45 (1950)
- Sierra Passage (1951) (screenplay)
- Cavalry Scout (1951)
- The Adventures of Wild Bill Hickok (2 episodes, 1951)
- Cattle Town (1952)
- Cow Country (1953) (adaptation)
- Riding Shotgun (1954)
- Cattle Queen of Montana (1954) (story)
- Riding Shotgun (1955)
- Davy Crockett, King of the Wild Frontier (1955)
- Cheyenne (1955) (unknown episodes)
- The Forest Ranger (1956)
- The Wild Dakotas (1956)
- Davy Crockett and the River Pirates (1956)
- Westward Ho, the Wagons! (1956)
- Johnny Tremain (1957)
- Maverick (1 episode, 1958)
- Bronco (1 episode, 1958)
- Redentor, El (1959)
- Walt Disney Presents (15 episodes, 1954–1961)
- The Virginian (1 episode, 1964)
- Mara of the Wilderness (1965)
- Johnny Tiger (1966)
- The Iron Horse (1 episode, 1967)
- Daniel Boone (1 episode, 1967)

=== Song lyrics ===
- "The Ballad of Davy Crockett" and "Farewell" for Davy Crockett, King of the Wild Frontier (1955) TV series
- "Johnny Tremain" and "The Liberty Tree" for Johnny Tremain (1957) TV series based on Esther Forbes novel
- "Westward Ho, the Wagons!" and "The Ballad of John Colter" for Westward Ho, the Wagons! (1956) TV series
- "Daisy Crockett"
- "Huckleberry Finn"
- "King of the River"
- "Ladies in the Sky"
- "Pancho Lopez"
- "Polly You are My Love"
- "Saga of Andy Burnett"
- "Yaller Yaller Gold"
