= Mary Butterworth =

British counterfeiter (1686–1775)

Mary Peck Butterworth (July 27, 1686 – February 7, 1775) was a counterfeiter in colonial America.

== Biography ==
Born to Joseph and Martha Peck in Rehoboth, Massachusetts, Mary married John Butterworth, son of a British captain in 1710. Mary allegedly started her counterfeiting operation around 1716. According to those who would later testify against her, she used starched cotton cloths to produce counterfeit bills, rather than the metal plates used more commonly in counterfeiting.

Using a slightly dampened piece of starched cloth she was able to lift ink from a genuine bill. With a hot iron, she transferred a pattern from the cloth to a blank paper bill, then inked the pattern by hand with quill pens. The original cotton cloth was easily disposed of through burning, leaving no hard evidence of a crime. Butterworth allegedly organized her counterfeiting operation into a cottage industry, sternly overseeing the work of the entire family. At the height of her operation, she was reportedly selling counterfeit bills at half their face value.

Colonial authorities knew of an extensive counterfeiting ring operating somewhere in the Rhode Island area throughout the later half of the 1710s, and felt it was beginning to have a damaging impact on the entire colonial economy. In 1722 colonial authorities became suspicious of Mary Butterworth after her husband John purchased a large, expensive new home for the family.

On August 14, 1723 a trial was held in Newport, Rhode Island. One Nicholas Campe testified he passed two counterfeit Rhode Island bills he obtained through Butterworth. Two of Butterworth's associates (her brother and his wife) turned state's evidence and also testified against her. Ultimately though, the court dismissed all charges against her for lack of hard evidence. Under the legal code of 1710 in colonial Rhode Island if any of the Butterworth family had been convicted of the crime of counterfeiting they would have faced severe punishment.

[The offender] was to suffer the pains of having their ears cropped, to be whipped or fined at discretion and imprisoned as the nature of the offense requires, and to pay double damage to the persons defrauded. In case the offender had no estate, he should be set at work, or sold for any term of years which the discretion of the judges considered satisfactory.

After the trial, Mrs. Butterworth reportedly gave up counterfeiting. She died in 1775 in Bristol County, Massachusetts, aged 88.
