= Samuel Mason =

American militia captain and pirate leader (1739–1803)

- No known portrait of Samuel Mason exists from life. A likeness from his physical description mentioned in historical records.
- Born: Samuel Ross Mason; November 8, 1739; Norfolk, Virginia, British America
- Died: 1803 (aged 63–64); Jefferson County, Mississippi Territory, U.S.
- Cause of death: Murder by gunshot wound or tomahawk
- Other names: Sam Mason, Mason, Samuel Meason, Meason, Captain Mason, Ensign Mason, Squire Mason, Mason of the Woods, Wilson, Bully Wilson
- Occupations: Horse thief, soldier, state militia officer, frontiersman, associate judge, tavern keeper, burglar, bandit, justice of the peace, criminal gang leader, river pirate
- Employer(s): Virginia state government, self-employed
- Spouse: Rosanna or Rosannah Dorsey
- Children: 6
- Relatives: George Mason (grandfather)
- Military career
- Allegiance: Virginia; United States
- Branch: Virginia State Forces
- Service years: 1777–1779
- Rank: Captain
- Unit: Ohio County Militia
- Commands: Captain Samuel Mason's Company
- Conflicts: American Revolutionary War; First Battle of Fort Henry; Sullivan Expedition

Samuel Ross Mason (Note: Also sometimes spelled Meason) (November 8, 1739 – 1803), was an American Revolutionary War veteran, Virginia militia captain, justice of the peace, frontier leader, and later, a figure associated with river piracy and highway robbery. He is best known as the leader of the Mason Gang, a notorious group active along the lower Ohio River and Mississippi Rivers in the late 18th and early 19th centuries. Mason is most famously linked to the Cave-in-Rock area, a notorious river pirate stronghold along the Ohio River.

Born in Virginia, Mason served in the Revolutionary War, notably on the western frontier. Following the war, he became involved in the region's lawlessness, eventually establishing himself as a prominent figure in outlaw circles. His gang was involved in various illegal activities, including piracy and robbery, and was associated with notorious sites such as Red Banks, Cave-in-Rock, Stack Island, and the Natchez Trace.

Mason's motivations have been the subject of much speculation, since personal anecdotes and firsthand accounts of his life are scarce to nonexistent. While his criminal activities are well-documented, it has been suggested that his actions may have been driven by broader political and economic motivations. In particular, his later resistance to federal authority, particularly following the Whiskey Rebellion of 1791–1794, has led some to interpret his post-war activities as part of a broader anti-government sentiment. This interpretation presents Mason as not merely a criminal, but potentially a figure of resistance to what he perceived as an overreaching government, particularly in the post-Revolutionary War era. However, his activities are also seen by others primarily as self-serving criminal ventures, and his role in the outlaw world of the frontier continues to shape his legacy.

== Early life ==
Samuel Mason was born on November 8, 1739, in Norfolk, Colony of Virginia, the son of Thomas Mason and Mary Newton. His paternal grandfather was George Mason, a second-generation member of the House of Burgesses (great-grandfather Lemuel also served as a member of the House of Burgesses). Samuel Mason was raised in what is now Charles Town, West Virginia, which was part of Virginia prior to the Civil War.

According to Lyman Draper, in the 1750s Mason got his earliest start in crime as a teenager by stealing the horses of Colonel John L. Hite, in Frederick County, Virginia, being wounded and caught by his pursuers. He moved from Charles Town to what is now Ohio County, West Virginia, also at that time a part of Virginia, in 1773.

== American Revolutionary War service ==
During the American Revolution, Samuel Mason was a captain of the Ohio County Militia in the Virginia State Forces. According to Ohio County court minutes dated January 7, 1777, Mason was recommended to Patrick Henry, the governor of Virginia, to serve as captain of the militia. On January 28, Mason was present and cited as a captain from Ohio County at a "council of war" held at Catfish Camp, located at or near present-day Washington, Pennsylvania.

On June 8, 1777, Mason wrote a letter from Fort Henry, Virginia (present-day Wheeling, West Virginia) to Brigadier General Edward Hand at Fort Pitt (present-day Pittsburgh, Pennsylvania). The letter he wrote was signed Samuel Meason. On September 1, 1777, Captain Mason was wounded but survived an ambush by Native Americans near Fort Henry. Most of the men in his militia company perished during the attack.

From August 11 to September 14, 1779, Mason, while at Fort Henry, accompanied Colonel Daniel Brodhead and his 8th Pennsylvania Regiment of the Continental Army, combined with militia troops from Fort Pitt, to destroy ten tribal villages of the pro-British Seneca tribe in northeastern Pennsylvania during the Sullivan Expedition, in retaliation for the devastating Iroquois attacks in the Cobleskill, Wyoming Valley, and Cherry Valley massacres of 1778.

According to court-martial records in Ohio County, Virginia, Mason was still on duty as an officer in the Ohio County Militia at Fort Henry until 1781. He appeared at the courts-martial and was present as a witness for military proceedings against other soldiers. Mason appeared twice at the Ohio County courthouse in Wheeling on November 7, 1780, and May 7, 1781.

== Honest pursuits ==
In his book The Outlaws of Cave-In-Rock, Otto A. Rothert stated that Samuel Mason moved again, in 1779, to a part of Virginia east of Wheeling that is now in present-day Washington County, Pennsylvania, where he was elected justice of the peace and later selected as an associate judge, leaving for an area that was then a part of Virginia and now in present-day Kentucky in 1784. Mason's surname was spelled interchangeably as "Meason" in many of the early frontier records. This is explained in two family histories of the Mason/Meason family, Pioneer Period and Pioneer People of Fairfield County, Ohio by C. M. L. Wiseman, dated 1901, and Torrence and Allied Families by Robert M. Torrence, dated 1938.

During this period, the frontier was a place of mounting social and political tension, as exemplified by events like the Whiskey Rebellion, which may have influenced Mason through the widespread discontent with federal taxes and central authority. While his involvement in the rebellion itself is not definitively documented, the timeline of the rebellion, coupled with Mason's known proximity, prior military service, and later activities, suggests he may have shared in the frustrations that led to the unrest, contributing to his eventual shift towards more radical actions.

== Criminal career ==
In the early 1790s, Mason moved his family to the Red Banks on the Ohio River, near present-day Henderson, Kentucky, where he began his full-time criminal activities. He later settled downriver on Diamond Island and engaged in river piracy. By 1797, Mason moved the base of his operations still further downriver to Cave-in-Rock on the northern bank of the Ohio River in what was then the unorganized Northwest Territory. The Mason Gang of river pirates openly based themselves at this huge, sheltered riverside cave and prominent landmark.

Mason had a brief association with the first known serial killers in America, Micajah and Wiley Harpe, as well as Peter Alston, and possibly John Duff, the counterfeiter. Mason and his gang stayed at Cave-in-Rock until the summer of 1799, when they were expelled by the "Exterminators", a group of regulators under the leadership of Captain Young of Mercer County, Kentucky.

Samuel Mason then moved his operations down the Mississippi River and settled his family in the territory of Spanish Louisiana (in present-day Missouri) and became a highwayman along the Natchez Trace in the Mississippi Territory (in present-day Mississippi). It was on the Natchez Trace that Mason received his most infamous nickname. He would leave a message after each crime (often in the blood of his murdered victims) proudly stating, "Done by Mason of the Woods". In April 1802, Mississippi Territorial Governor William C. C. Claiborne was informed that Mason and Wiley Harpe had attempted to board the boat of a Colonel Joshua Baker between Yazoo (now Yazoo City, Mississippi) and Walnut Hills (now Vicksburg, Mississippi).

== Physical appearance ==
A man named Swaney, who saw Samuel Mason often, described his appearance: "He weighed about two hundred pounds, and was a fine looking man. He was rather modest and unassuming, and had nothing of the raw-head-and-bloody-bones appearance which his character would indicate". Another man, Henry Howe, described Mason as: "...a man of gigantic stature and of more than ordinary talents". A William Darby also described him as follows: "Mason at any time of his life or in any situation, had something extremely ferocious in his look, which arose particularly from a tooth which projected forwards, and could only be covered with his lip by effort".

== Arrest, escape, and death ==
According to Spanish colonial court records, Spanish government officials arrested Samuel Mason and his men early in 1803 at the Little Prairie settlement, now Caruthersville in southeastern Missouri. Mason and his gang, including his family members, were taken to the Spanish colonial government in New Madrid, Spanish Upper Louisiana Territory, where a three-day hearing was held to determine whether Mason was truly involved in river piracy, of which he had been formally accused.

Although he claimed he was simply a farmer who had been maligned by his enemies, the peculiar presence of $7,000 in currency and twenty human scalps found in his baggage was the damning evidence that convinced the Spanish he was indeed a river pirate. Mason and his family were taken under armed guard to New Orleans, the capital of Spanish Lower Louisiana Territory, where the Spanish colonial governor ordered them handed over to the American authorities in the Mississippi Territory, as all crimes they had been convicted of appeared to have taken place in American territory or against American river boats.

While being transported up the Mississippi River, Samuel Mason and gang members John Sutton or Setton, one of the many aliases used by Wiley Harpe, and James May, alias of Peter Alston, overpowered their guards and escaped, with Mason being shot in the head during the escape. One of the 1803 accounts {Rothert. p. 247} claimed Captain Robert McCoy, the commandant of New Madrid, was killed by Mason during their escape. McCoy actually died in 1840, and was neither crippled nor killed by Mason.

American territorial governor William C. C. Claiborne immediately issued a reward for their recapture, prompting Wiley Harpe and Peter Alston to bring Mason's head, in an attempt to claim the reward money. Whether they killed Mason or whether he died from his wound suffered in the escape attempt has never been established. "Setton" and "May" were recognized and identified as wanted criminals Wiley Harpe and Peter Alston. They were arrested, tried in U.S. federal court, found guilty of piracy, and hanged in Old Greenville, Jefferson County, Mississippi Territory in early 1804.

== Gallery ==
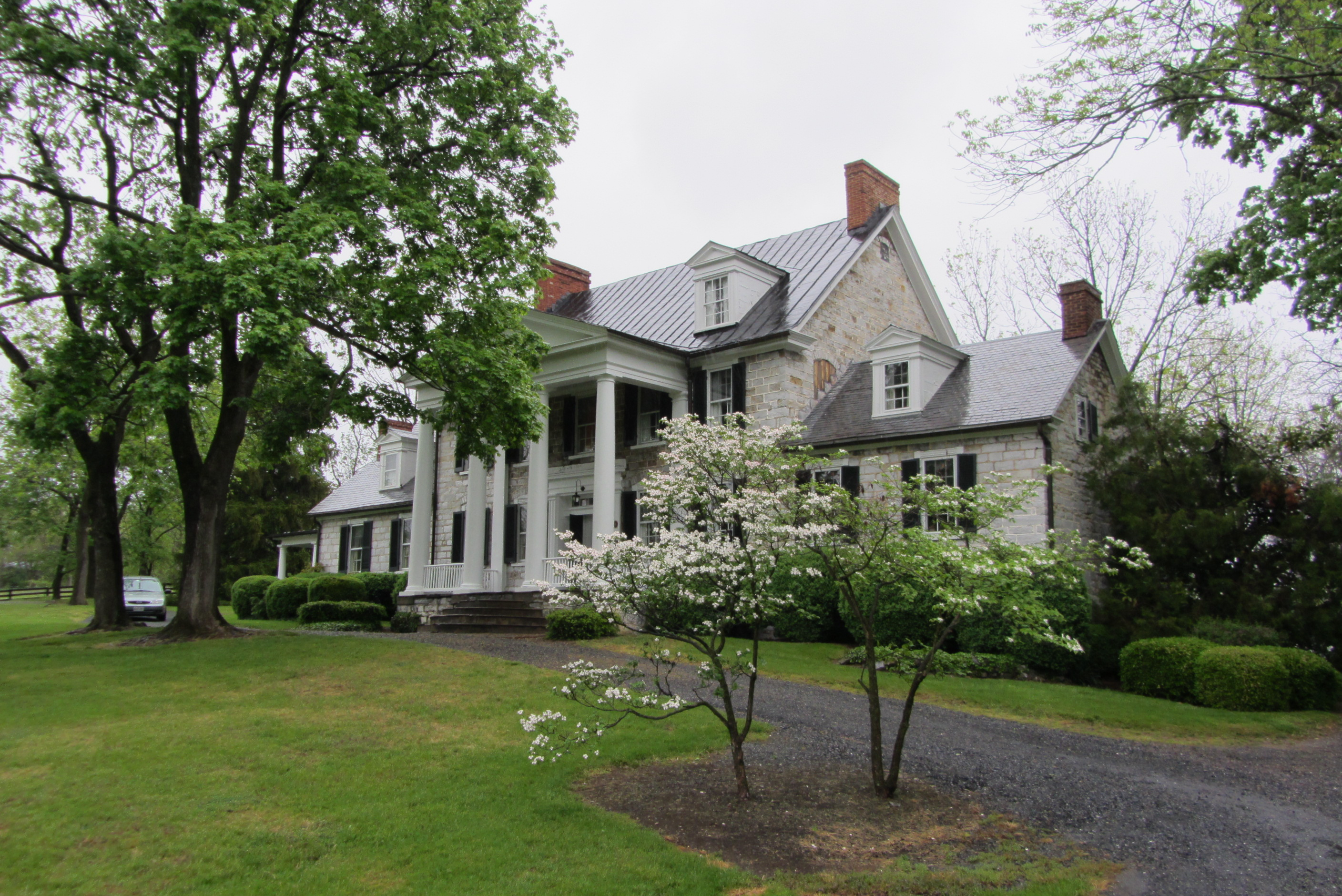
"Springdale", in Frederick County, Virginia, was built in 1753 and was the home of Colonel John L. Hite. A teenage Samuel Mason stole the horses of Colonel Hite and was later pursued, wounded, and captured, but because of his young age, he was not punished any further.

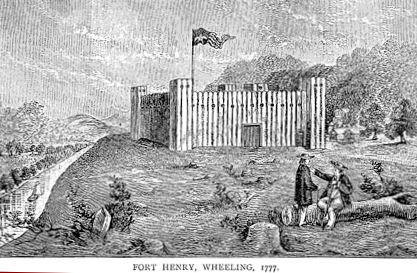
Fort Henry, formerly in Pennsylvania, now West Virginia, in 1777, at the time, Captain Samuel Mason was wounded and survived an ambush by Native Americans. Most of the men in Captain Samuel Mason's Company perished during the attack.

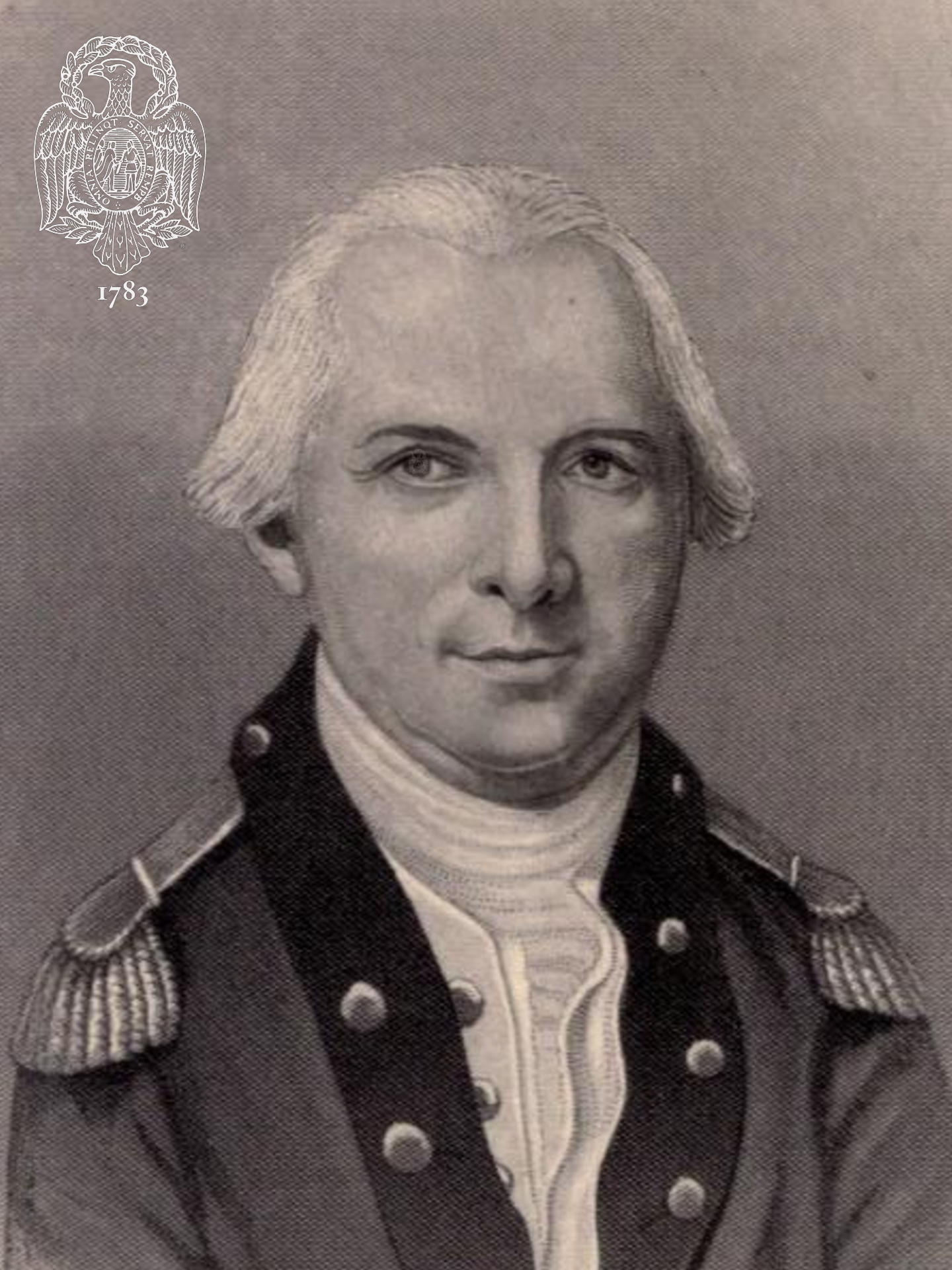
Colonel Daniel Brodhead, in a portrait, who led an expedition in 1779 in which Captain Samuel Mason while at Fort Henry joined along with 8th Pennsylvania Regiment of the Continental Army combined with militia troops from Fort Pitt to destroy the pro-British Seneca tribal villages in northeastern Pennsylvania.

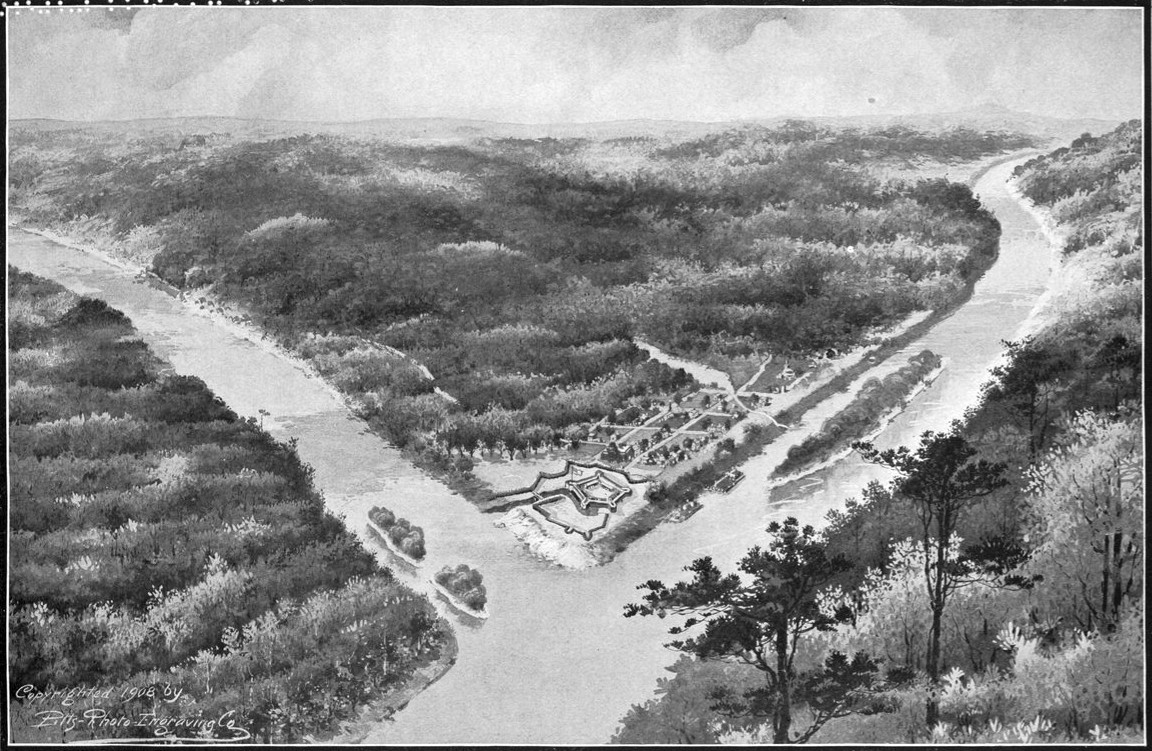
Fort Pitt, Pennsylvania, where in 1779 Captain Samuel Mason joined the expedition of Colonel Daniel Brodhead against the pro-British Seneca tribe.

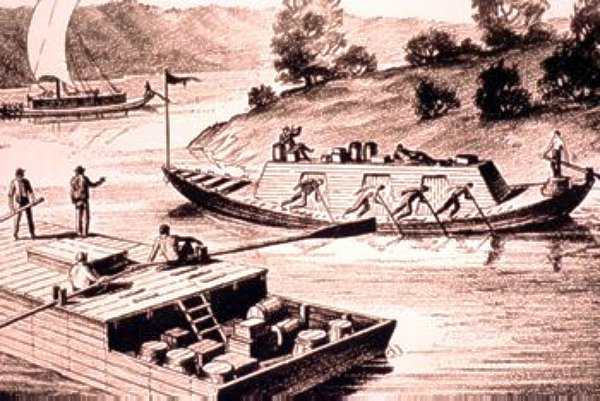
While on the Ohio River and later the Mississippi, Samuel Mason and his gang of river pirates chose flatboats, keelboats, and rafts as profitable targets to attack because of the valuable and plentiful cargo on board.

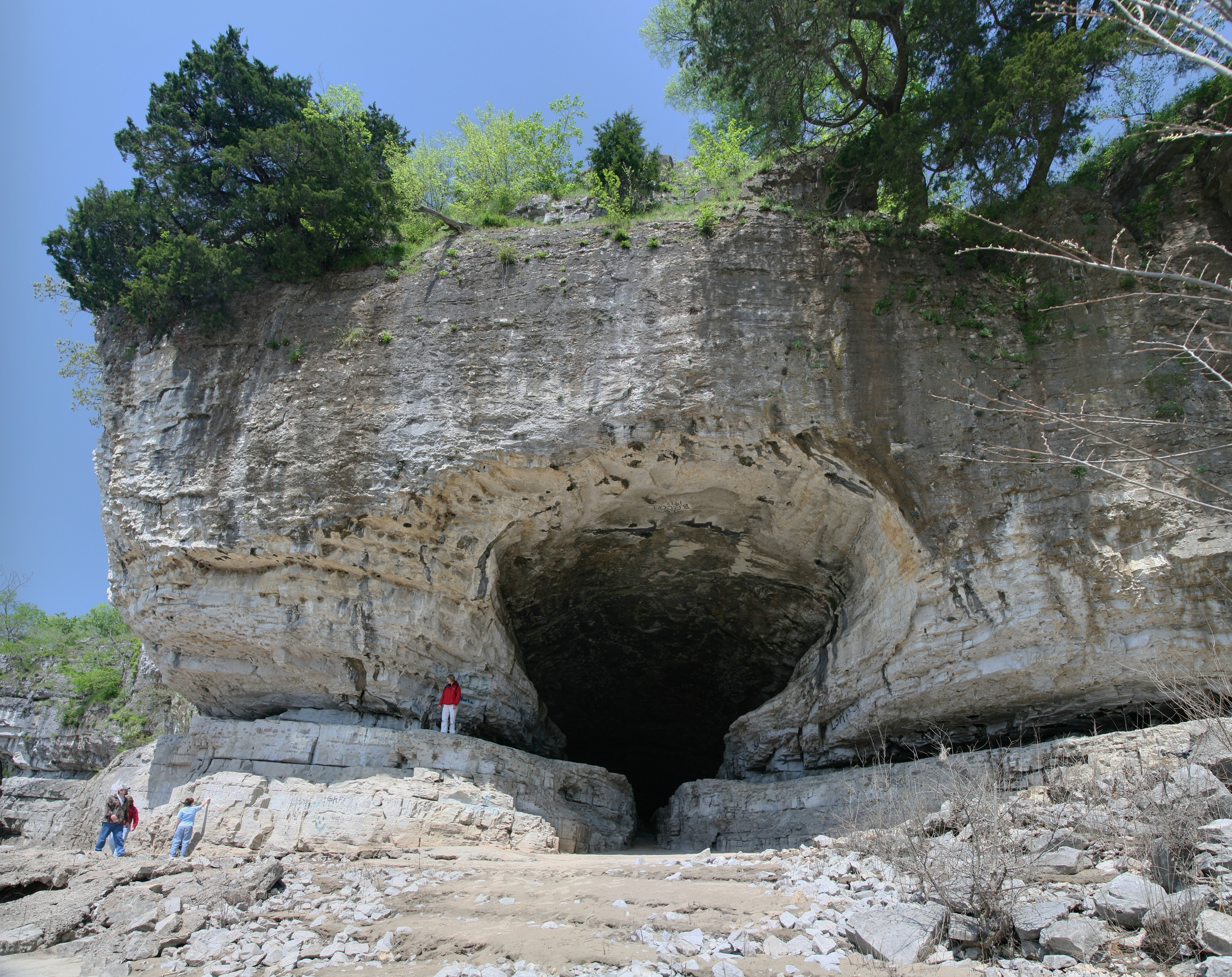
Following his military service, in the American Revolutionary War, Samuel Mason led a gang of river pirates, from 1797 to 1799, on the Ohio River, at the infamous outlaw haunt of Cave-in-Rock.

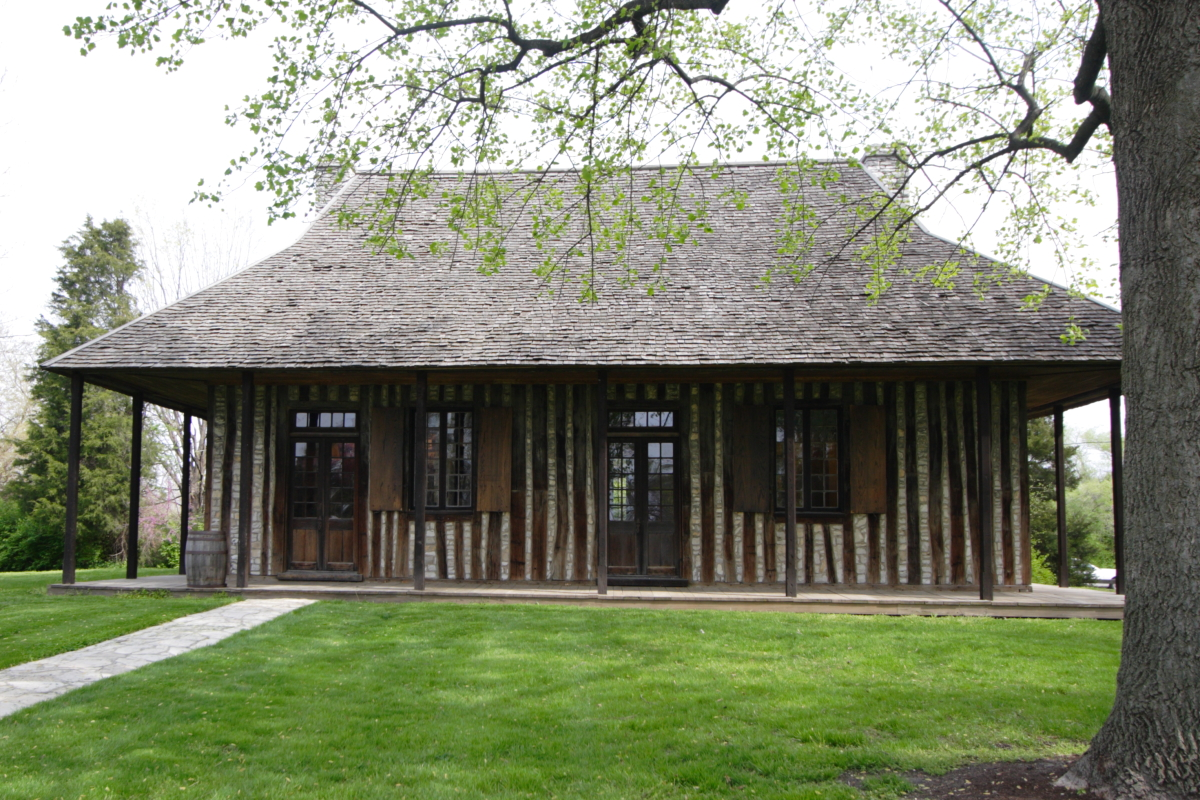
The Samuel Mason Gang was captured in 1803 and brought before the Spanish Territorial commandant, Colonel Robert McCoy, in New Madrid, Spanish Upper Louisiana Territory, New Spain. The courtroom would have been a small, simple structure similar to the Old Cahokia Courthouse in Cahokia, Illinois Country, Northwest Territory.

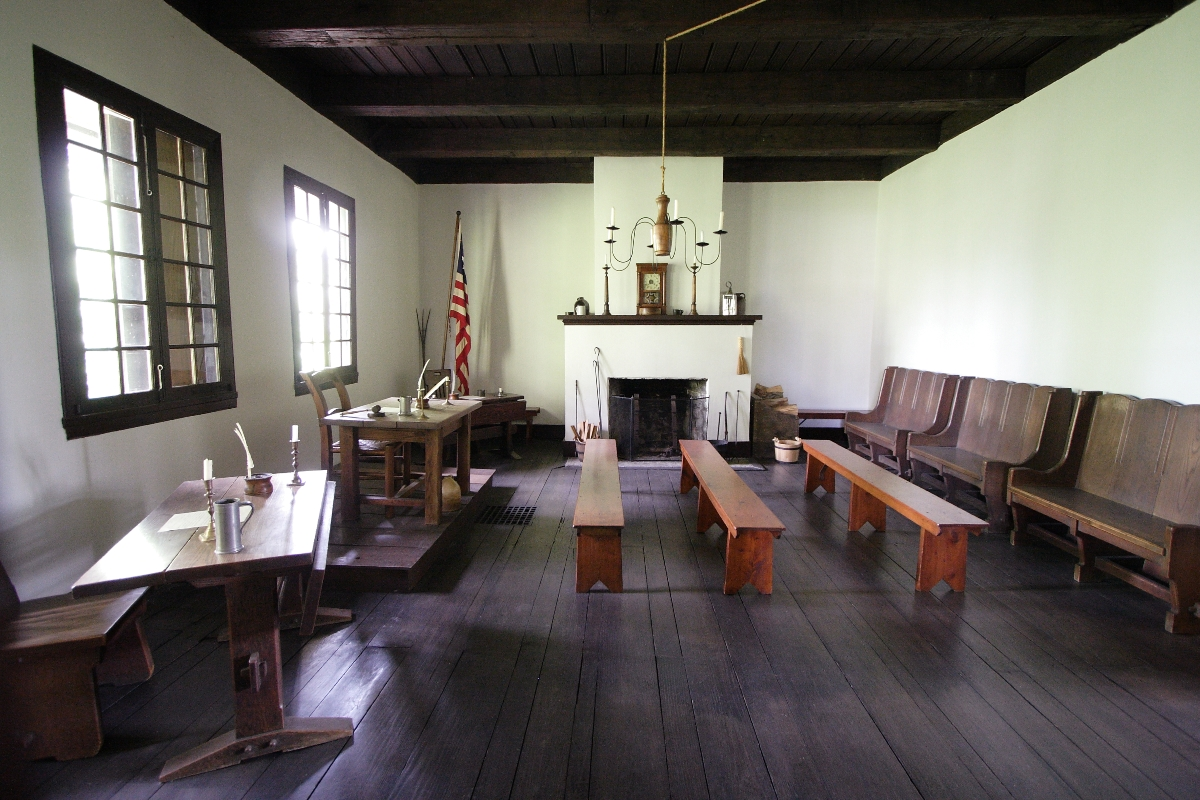
When the members of the Samuel Mason Gang received their hearing in the Spanish colonial court of New Madrid, the frontier courtroom may not have been much bigger than a typical courtroom interior, as was found in the Old Cahokia Courthouse.

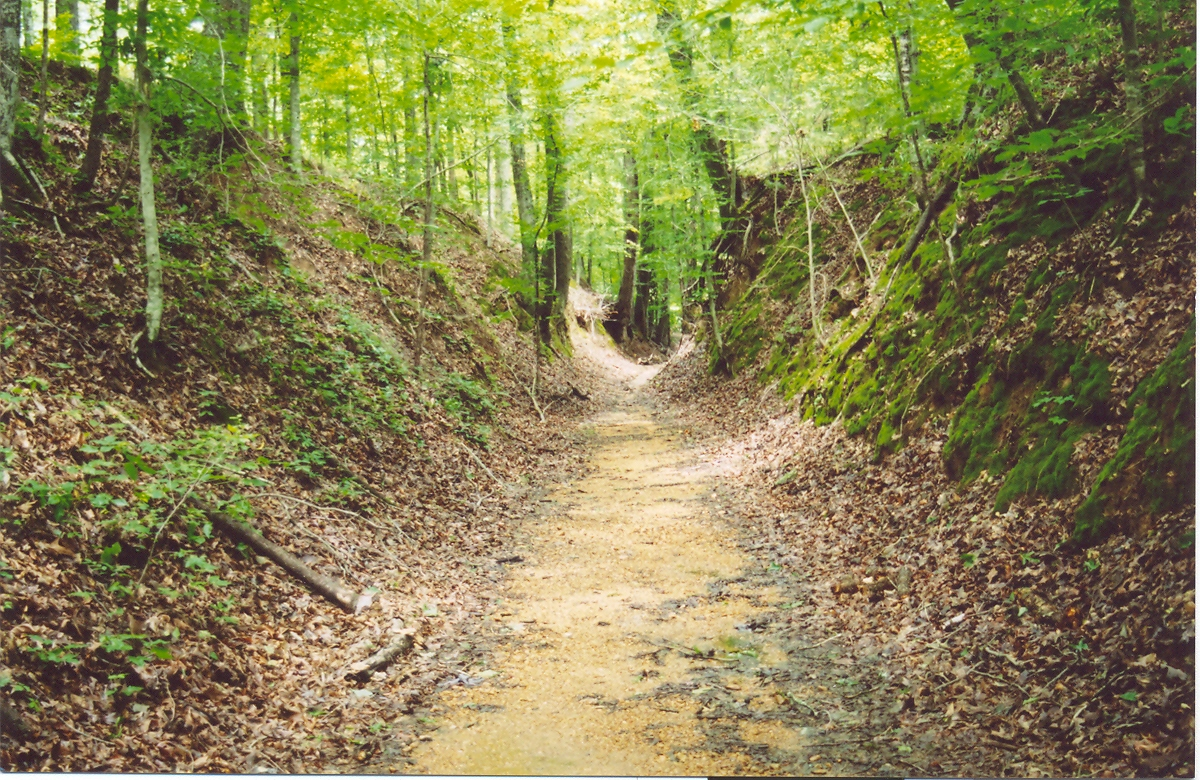
The old path of the "Natchez Trace", where, between 1799 and 1803, Samuel Mason and the Mason Gang committed highway robbery and murder, against helpless and unsuspecting travelers and were reported as crimes done by "Mason of the Woods"

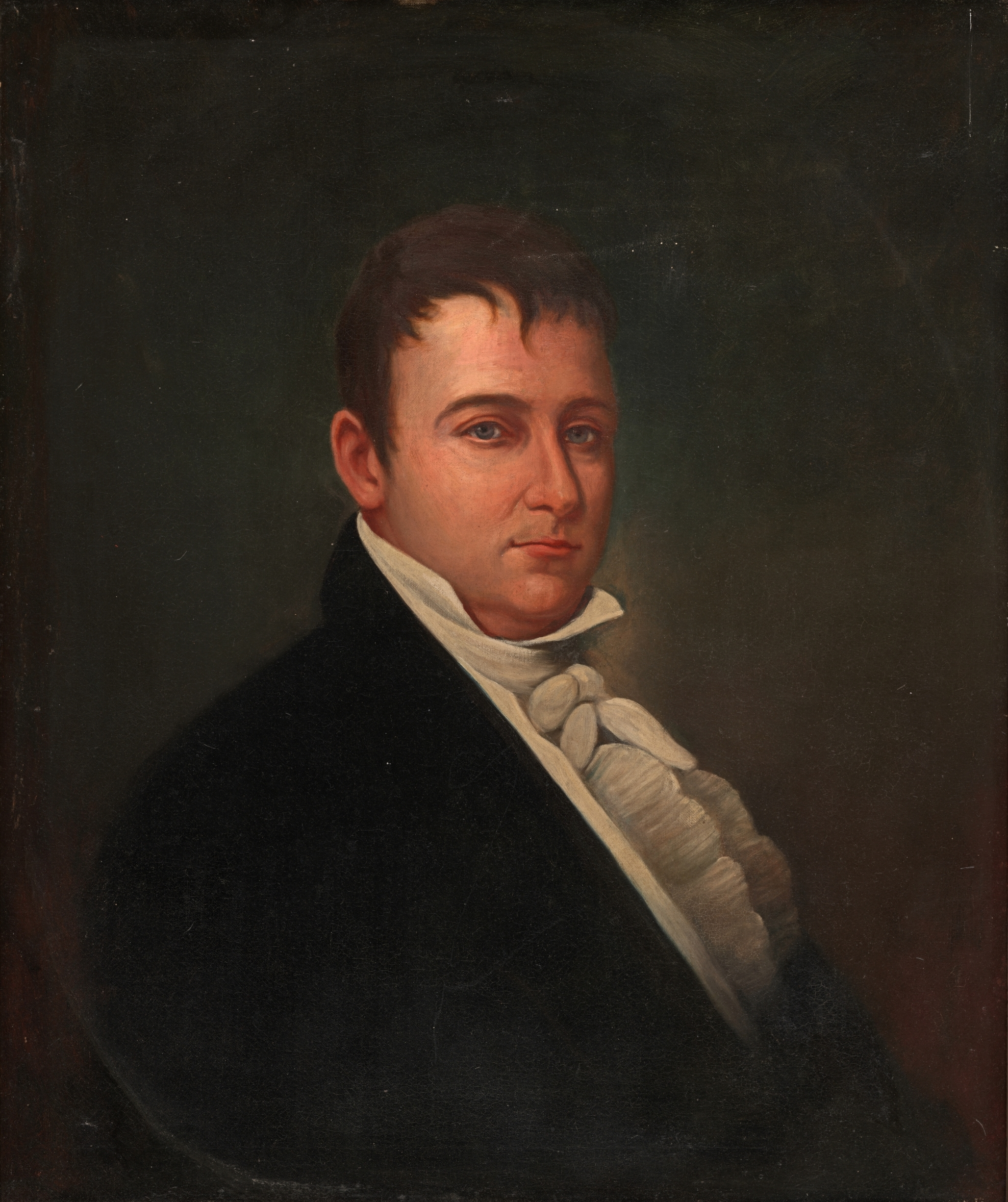
In 1803, Mississippi Territorial governor William C. C. Claiborne offered a $2,000 reward, a very large sum of money at the time, for the capture or severed head of Samuel Mason. Wiley Harpe and Peter Alston brought in the head of Mason to collect the reward and were identified and hanged.

== Similarities of Samuel Mason and the Mason Gang to other criminal gangs ==
From the 1790s-1833, James Ford led a double life while living in Ford's Ferry, Kentucky, as the justice of the peace and the gang leader of a group of highwaymen and river pirates on the Ohio River. From 1863 to 1864, Henry Plummer was the elected sheriff of the gold rush town, Bannack, Montana, in the Idaho Territory. He was later accused of being the leader of an outlaw gang, the Innocents, who stole gold shipments from Bannick, and was hanged by Bannick vigilantes.

== In popular culture ==
Walter Brennan (on the right) as Samuel Mason-like river pirate gang leader, Colonel Jeb Hawkins, and Lee Van Cleef in the 1962 film, How the West Was Won

In the 1956 Walt Disney television series Davy Crockett and the River Pirates, a Hollywoodized version of Samuel Mason is portrayed by American actor Mort Mills, who appears alongside the Harpe brothers.

In the 1962 John Ford Western epic film How the West Was Won, a Samuel Mason-like frontier outlaw leader of a gang of river pirates is portrayed by Walter Brennan, as the fictional character of Colonel Jeb Hawkins, which alludes to the historical Cave-In-Rock.

== See also ==
- Peter Alston
- James Ford (pirate)
- John Murrell (bandit)
- Stack Island (Mississippi River)
- Tower Rock
