= Abel Buell =

- Born: February 1, 1742; Killingworth, Connecticut
- Died: March 10, 1822 (aged 80); New Haven, Connecticut
- Education: Goldsmith apprentice
- Spouses: Mary, Lettuce, Rebecca
- Children: William, Abel, Mary, Benjamin, Jeremiah, Sally
- Parent(s): John and Abigail
- Engineering career
- Discipline: Inventor, cartographer
- Projects: Published the first map of the new United States created by an American
- Significant design: Patented a lapidary machine; Invented a minting machine

Abel Buell (1742–1822), born in Killingworth, Connecticut, was a goldsmith, silversmith, jewelry designer, engraver, surveyor, printer, type manufacturer, mint master, textile miller, and counterfeiter in the American colonies. In 1784, Buell published A New and Correct Map of the United States of North America Layd down from the latest Observations and best Authorities agreeable to the Peace of 1783; it was the first map of the new United States created by an American. He was also an inventor. He invented a lapidary machine to cut and polish gems, a minting machine that could product 120 coins per minute, and machines for planting onions and corn. He was the first man to design and cast type in the United States.

== Early life ==
As a child, Abel Buell apprenticed with a goldsmith. By age 19, he was financially secure and married. In 1755, Buell was apprenticed in Madison, Connecticut, to master silversmith and his future brother-in-law, Ebenezer Chittenden. Chittenden has the distinction of having produced more individual, surviving silver pieces, than any other silversmith in Connecticut.

== Career ==
A New and Correct Map of the United States, 1784 map by Buell

Buell gained notoriety at an early age as a counterfeiter by altering five-pound note engraving plates into larger denomination plates. His sentence was to be branded above the forehead under the scalp, loss of a portion of his right ear, and life in prison, plus forfeiture of all his lands and estates. Because of his youth, he served little time in prison and only the top part of his ear was cut off, but the authorities permitted it to be sewn back on. In 1765, Buell received a patent for a lapidary machine, making him the first Connecticut resident to receive a patent. After creating a ring on that machine, and presenting it to the prosecuting attorney, Buell's counterfeiting sentence was pardoned.

In 1770, Buell moved to New Haven, Connecticut, and went to work for cartographer Bernard Romans. After the American Revolutionary War ended, Buell used the minting machine he had invented to mint the State of Connecticut's first official copper coins. Connecticut coppers were struck from 1785 to 1788 by Buell. Buell engraved the dies for the Connecticut copper coinage as well as the dies for the Fugio cents - America's first coinage. By 1784, Buell cut punches for, and cast his own type and published the first American-made map of the United States. The wall map measured 43 × 48 inches, was printed in four sections, and hand-applied watercolor gave the map its color. In 1789, Buell went to England on behalf of a group of investors to steal the secrets of cotton manufacturing from the British and bring that knowledge back to America. While there, he gained both practical knowledge and a sum of money that allowed him, upon his return, to establish one of Connecticut's first cotton mills. In later life, Buell joined with David Greenleaf to fashion some of the first steel swords manufactures specifically for the U.S. government. These swords were later used in the War of 1812 and were in service through the U.S. Civil War.

== Death ==
Squandering or giving away all the money he earned, Buell died in 1822 at the New Haven Almshouse. Leaving little behind, he is known mostly because of the biography researched and written by Lawrence C. Wroth and a biography by Christopher McDowell. The U.S. Library of Congress received a donation of his rare map of the United States, and on November 11, 2013, mounted an exhibition showcasing it entitled "Mapping a New Nation: Abel Buell’s Map of the United States, 1784". The map was displayed in the Thomas Jefferson Building and online. The exhibition noted that it was the first map to be copyrighted in the United States.
