= Cave-in-Rock State Park =

State park in Illinois, United States

Cave-In-Rock State Park
- IUCN category III (natural monument or feature)
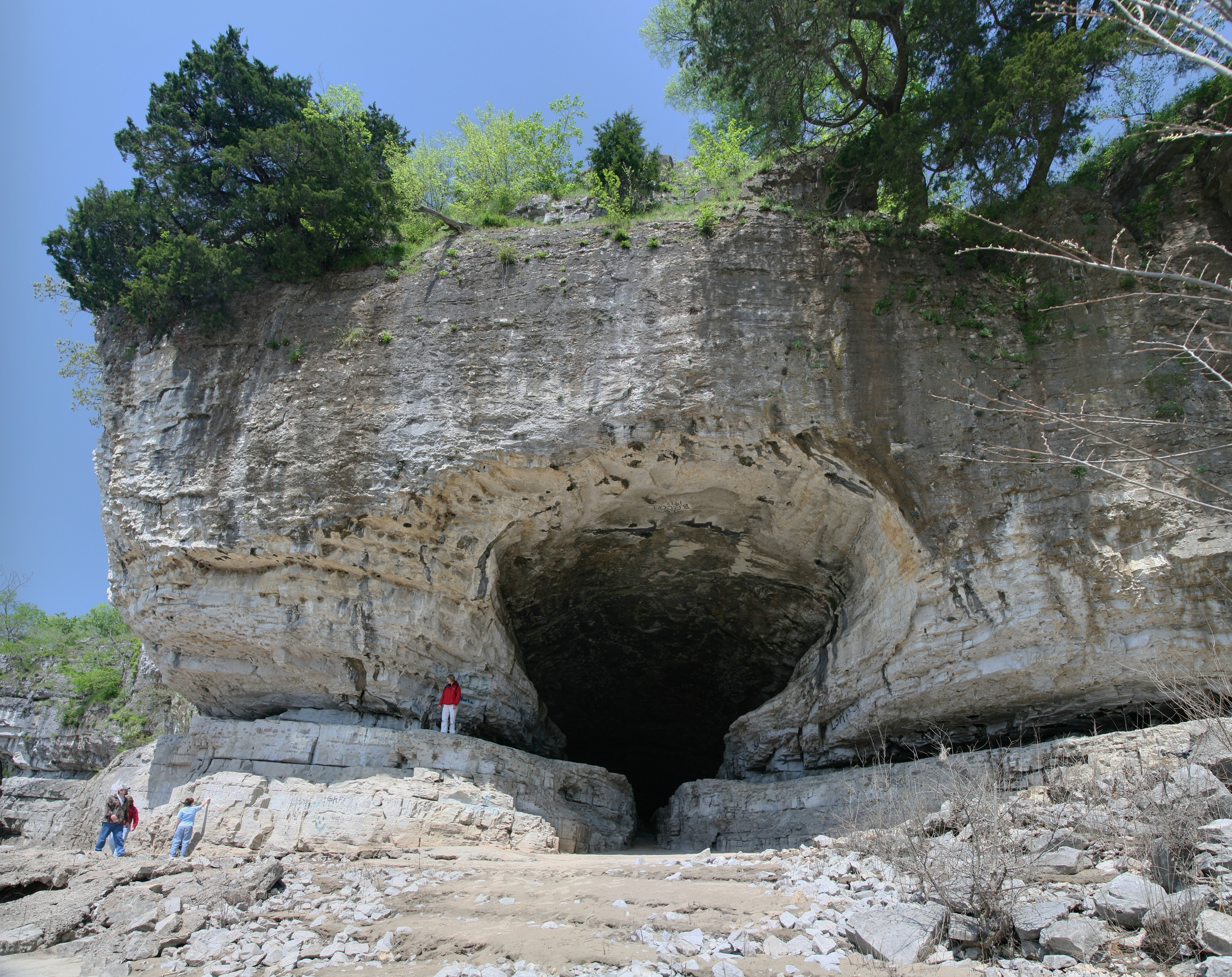

- Location within Illinois Location within the United States
- Location: Cave-In-Rock, Hardin County, Illinois, U.S.
- Coordinates: 37°28′07″N 88°09′21″W
- Area: 204 acres (83 ha)
- Established: 1929
- Governing body: Illinois Department of Natural Resources
- Cave-In-Rock
- U.S. National Register of Historic Places
- Location: 0.5 mi N of the town of Cave-In-Rock, Cave-In-Rock, Illinois
- Area: 1 acre (0.40 ha)
- MPS: Caught in the Middle: The Civil War on the Lower Ohio River MPS
- NRHP reference No.: 98000984
- Added to NRHP: August 6, 1998

Cave-In-Rock State Park is an Illinois state park, on 204 acres (0.83 km^{2}), in the town of Cave-in-Rock, Hardin County, Illinois, in the United States. The state park contains the historic Cave-In-Rock, a landmark of the Ohio River. It is maintained by the Illinois Department of Natural Resources (IDNR).

== Geology ==
The park's primary feature is a 55-foot (17 m)-wide riverside cave formed by wind and water erosion and cataclysmic effects of the 1811–12 New Madrid earthquakes.

Bedded limestone inside the cave at Cave-in-Rock State Park, Illinois, 2026

The Cave-in-Rock was worn into the limestone bluffs of the Ohio River by floods, especially those caused by glacial meltwater following the Wisconsin ice age. Unlike Mammoth Cave in nearby Kentucky, it was not formed by typical karst processes; it is a tunnel eroded into the bluff.

== History ==
Cave-in-Rock was known and used for thousands of years by the Native Americans. The first European to discover the Cave was M. de Lery of France, who in 1729 mapped and named it "caverne dans Le Roc" (cf. supra). This name, translated directly into English, is the name the cave bears to this day. Other names for the cave included Rock-In-Cave, Rocking Cave, Rock-and-Cave, House of Nature, The Cave, Big Cave, Potato Cave, and Murrell's Cave.

During the 1790s and the first three decades of the 19th century, Cave-in-Rock reached the height of its notoriety. Flatboats carrying farm produce from Kentucky, Ohio, and southern Indiana began to float down the Ohio River towards the marketplace in New Orleans. As a known Ohio River landmark, the cave was a landmark of this dangerous journey. From approximately 1797 until 1799, the cave was a hideout for a notorious gang of bandits headed by Samuel Mason, who preyed upon the lawless river commerce. The outlaws Frank and Jesse James of the notorious James–Younger Gang also hid out in the cave, according to local lore, leaving their marks in the cave.

Later in the 19th century, Cave-in-Rock was tamed by settlers who formed the river town of Cave-In-Rock, Illinois, near the cave. The town survives to this day. It became the site of a river ferry, adjacent to the state park, that crosses the Ohio River from Illinois Route 1 to Kentucky Route 91.

The cave has been the main feature of Illinois' Cave-in-Rock State Park since 1929.

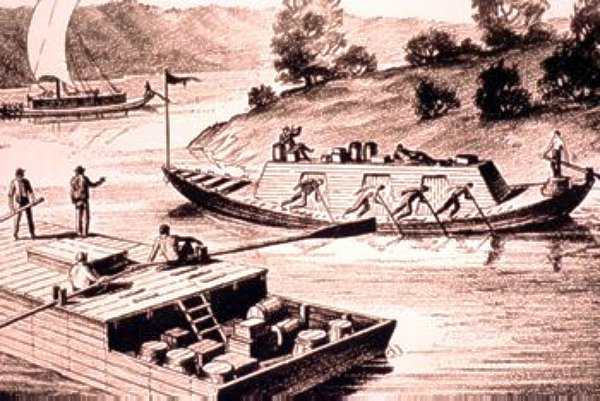
River pirates were some of the earliest settlers around Cave-in-Rock who preyed on the Ohio River flatboats, keelboats, and rafts, as profitable targets of goods, attacking the crews and pioneers who were easily overwhelmed and killed.

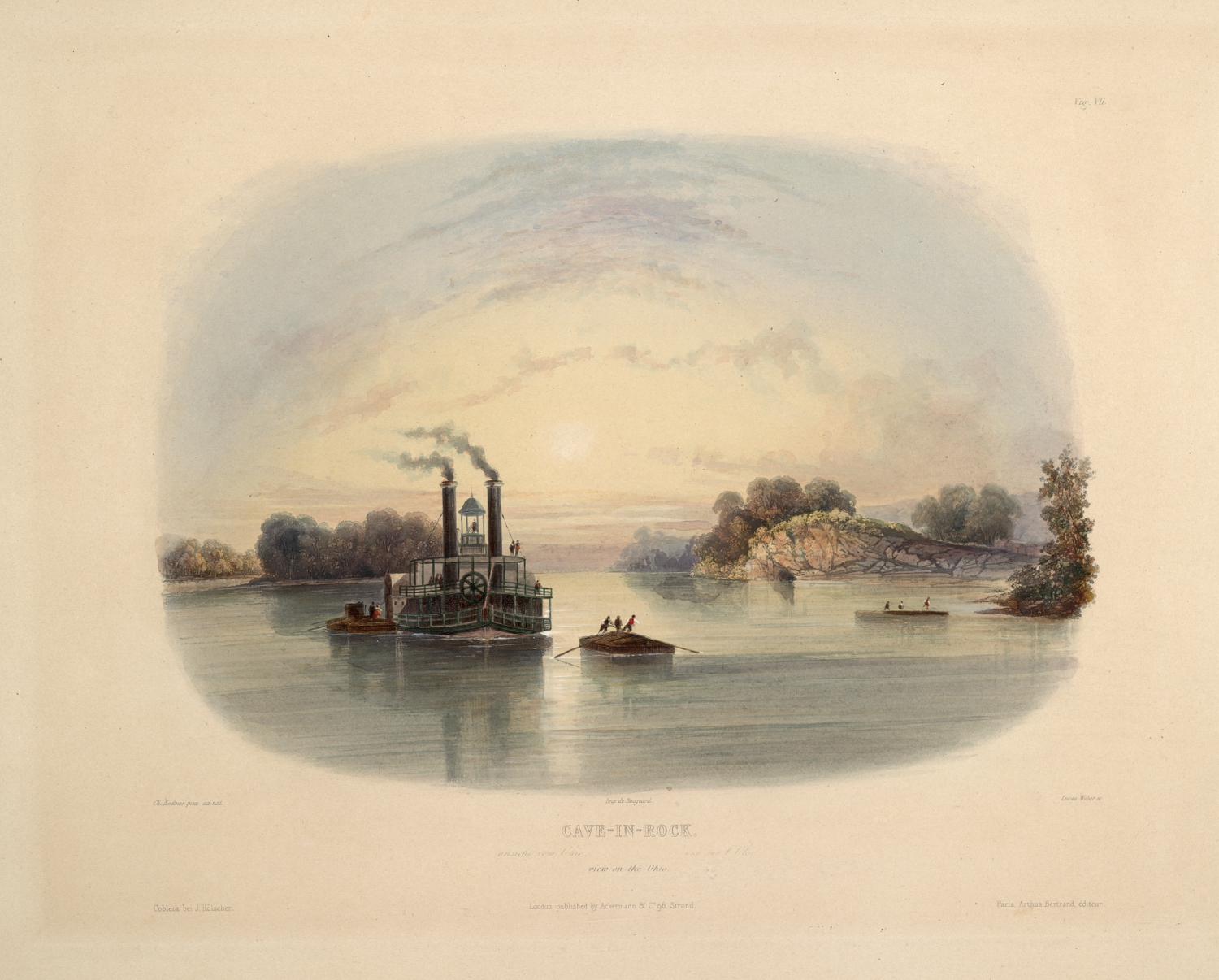
Cave-in-rock, view on the Ohio (circa 1832): aquatint by Karl Bodmer from the book "Maximilian, Prince of Wied's Travels in the Interior of North America, during the years 1832–1834"

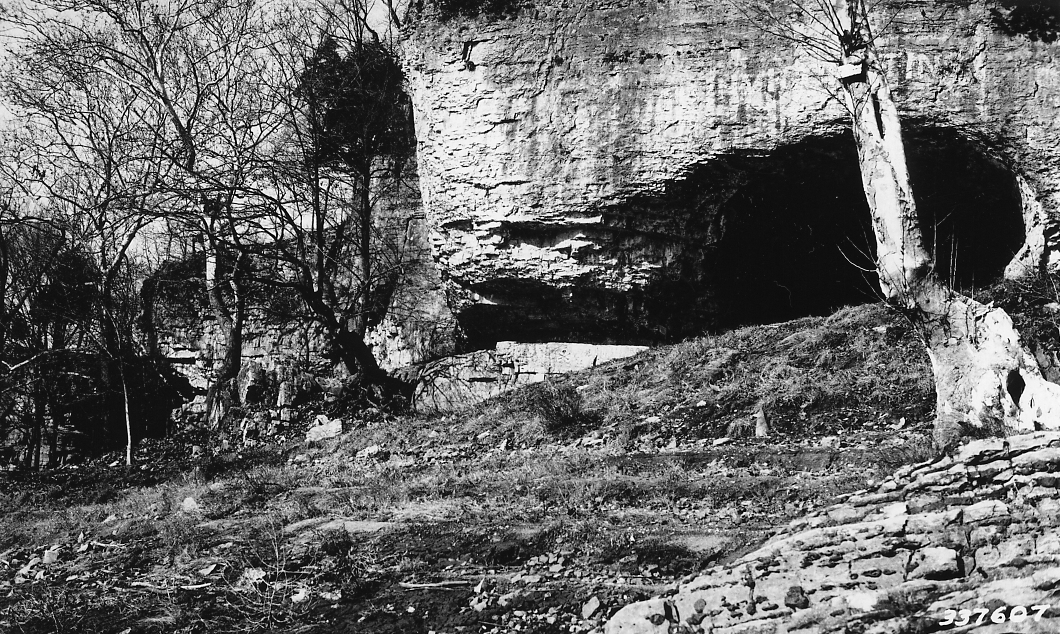
Cave-in-Rock in a 1936 photograph by the U.S. Department of Agriculture, Division of Forestry, looking similar to how it looked in the 18th and 19th centuries. Original photo caption: Cave at Cave-In-Rock, used by river pirates in the 1790s

== First Illinois state park ==
With the inauguration of steamboat traffic on the Ohio River in the 1810s, travelers such as artist Karl Bodmer bought tickets to steam up and down the river, and Cave-in-Rock has been a recognized landmark of river tourism ever since. In 1929, the state of Illinois acquired 64.5 acres of land, including the cave. Other small parcels of land were acquired later to form the current park. The state park, which stretches from the river's edge to the top of the adjacent 60-foot-tall (18 m) bluff, is maintained by IDNR for Ohio River access, camping, and hiking, including hikes to the historic cave.

== In popular culture ==
Walt Disney Productions used the site for the 1956 Davy Crockett adventure, Davy Crockett and the River Pirates. The cave overlooks Davy Crockett, his sidekick Georgie, and "King of the River" Mike Fink battling a group of river pirates headquartered at Cave-in-Rock. In 1962, the John Ford Western epic film How the West Was Won featured the cave. The 1999 In Search of History series Episode: River Pirates, a history documentary about the earliest and most active river pirates and frontier killers in the Ohio River Valley in the late 18th and early 19th Centuries, included the cave.
