= Patsy Conroy =

American burglar and river pirate

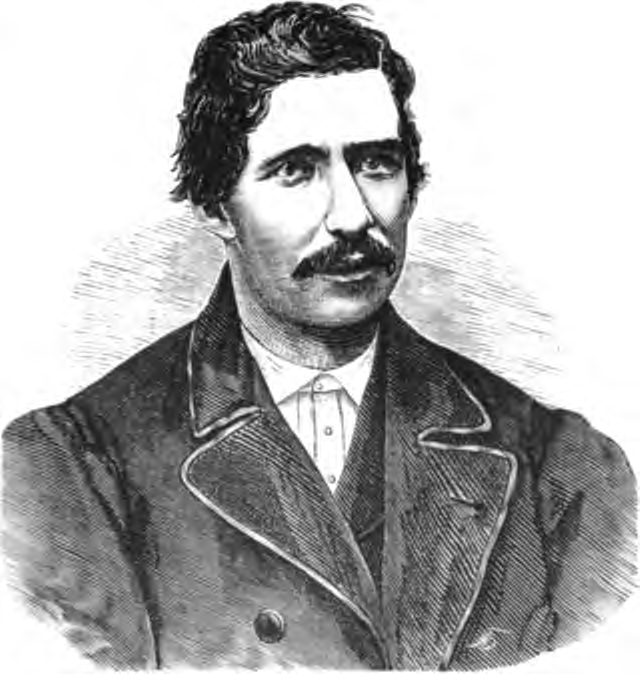
- An illustration of Patsy Conroy from "Criminals of America" (1876) by Philip Farley.
- Born: Patrick Conway c. 1846
- Other names: Patsey Conroy
- Occupation: Saloon keeper
- Known for: New York burglar and river pirate who founded the Patsy Conroy Gang
- Height: 5 ft 7 in (1.70 m)

Patrick Conway (c. 1846 – ????), commonly known by his alias Patsy or Patsy Conroy, was an American burglar and river pirate. He was the founder and leader of the Patsy Conroy Gang, a gang of river pirates active on the New York waterfront in the old Fourth Ward and Corlears' Hook districts during the post–American Civil War era.

Two fellow members of his gang, Denny Brady and Larry Griffin, later assumed control but he participated in their raiding towns in Westchester County. He and Larry Griffin were eventually convicted of robbing the home of Robert Emmet in White Plains in 1874, as well as Denny Brady in Catskill the same year, resulting in the gang's breakup.

== Biography ==
Conroy was described in Philip Farley's Criminals of America, Or, Tales of the Lives of Thieves: Enabling Every One to be His Own Detective (1876) as being "of Irish origin and a burglar. He is 30 years of age, five feet seven inches high, has black hair, gray eyes, several India-ink marks on his hand, and weights 150 lbs." He became known as an experienced river pirate in the New York underworld and "operated with great success" along the old Fourth Ward waterfront. In or around 1858, Conroy boarded a brigantine anchored at the foot of Jefferson Street with Bill Cummings and two other men. Capturing the watchman, whom they bound and gagged, Conroy led his companions to the main cabin where they subdued the 16-man crew and successfully looted the ship. Ten years later, he was implicated with Larry Griffin and Tommy Shea of the murder of a first mate during the robbery a ship anchored of Ryker's Island.

On one occasion, Conroy entered a Bowery saloon one night with Cummings, Boiled Oysters Malloy and Charley Mosher. Each of the four had been wounded, Conroy having been shot in the arm and Cummings in the chest. Jim McGuire, a Bowery thief, arrived shortly after with a bundle of stolen goods. Upon seeing the gangsters, McGuire ordered them a round of drinks. When Cummings complained about the whiskey they had been served, saying "they ought to be served champaigne", McGuire "good-naturedly" changed their order. Conroy then turned to McGuire and demanded a share of the young thief's merchandise. McGuire offered the men $10 each but Cummings scoffed at what he called "chicken-feed" and "unworthy of being offered to companions in distress". McGuire then walked away but was stopped by the men, received a punch in the stomach, and his goods stolen. Before leaving, Conroy told police "Officer, there's a man who has fallen off a car; better take him up".

Conroy ran a basement dive bar in the Bowery which was advertised as a restaurant but, in actuality, was a front for his gang's headquarters. The building, reputed to be "an arsenal and always garrisoned", was avoided by police. Only one officer, detective Holly Lyons, had "dared to make an arrest there" and police usually waited outside to arrest a suspect instead of entering the basement bar.

In the early 1870s, Conroy moved his gang to the Corlears' Hook district. Shortly after his arrival, Conroy started recruiting many of the area's infamous waterfront thieves and criminals including Socco the Bracer, Scotchy Lavelle, Johnny Dobbs, Kid Shanahan, Pugsey Hurley, Wreck Donovan, Tom The Mick, Beeny Kane, Piggy Noles, Billy Woods, Bum Mahoney, Denny Brady and Larry Griffin. Brady and Griffin would later become joint leaders of the gang.

Under his leadership, the Patsy Conroys dominated the New York waterfront district during the post-American Civil War era and remained one of the last active gangs of river pirates prior to the formation of the Steamboat Squad. Over time, Denny Brady and Larry Griffin gradually took over running the gang and may not have been actively involved some of the Patsy Conroys' more infamous crimes such as the Elizabeth or Mattan robberies during 1873. The failed robbery of the brig Elizabeth ended in the death of his chief lieutenant Socco the Bracer. Conroy was named as a suspect in the latter robbery, one which resulted in the wrongful imprisonment of fellow river pirates Tommy Dagan and Billy Carroll, and he and the others began relying more heavily on raiding isolated towns in Westchester County along Long Island Sound and occasionally the island itself. During the last two years of his criminal career, the Patsy Conroys "kept these hamlets in a chronic condition of terror" until 1874 when he and Griffin were arrested by famed detectives Richard King and Holly Lyons for robbing the home of Robert Emmett in White Plains (or New Rochelle). Brady was also convicted of a similar charge against Abraham Post in Catskill that same year. Held at the White Plains jail, both men were eventually convicted and sentenced to 20 years imprisonment in New York State Prison; - however a news article published by The New York Times five years later claimed he and his gang were in Sing Sing.

== See also ==
- Charlton Street Gang
- Daybreak Boys
- Patsy Conroy Gang
- Sadie Farrell
- George Gastlin (Steamboat Squad)
- Hook Gang
