= Hook Gang =

19th-century criminal gang in New York City

- The Hook Gang of river pirates raided ship cargo in the mid–late 19th century along the New York City waterfront.
- Founded: c. 1866
- Founding location: Corlear's Hook, Lower East Side, Manhattan, New York, United States
- Years active: c. 1866–1876
- Territory: Corlear's Hook, Lower East Side, Manhattan, New York, United States
- Ethnicity: predominantly Irish-American
- Membership (est.): 50–100
- Criminal activities: armed robbery, theft, hijacking, river piracy
- Rivals: Patsy Conroy Gang, Short Tails

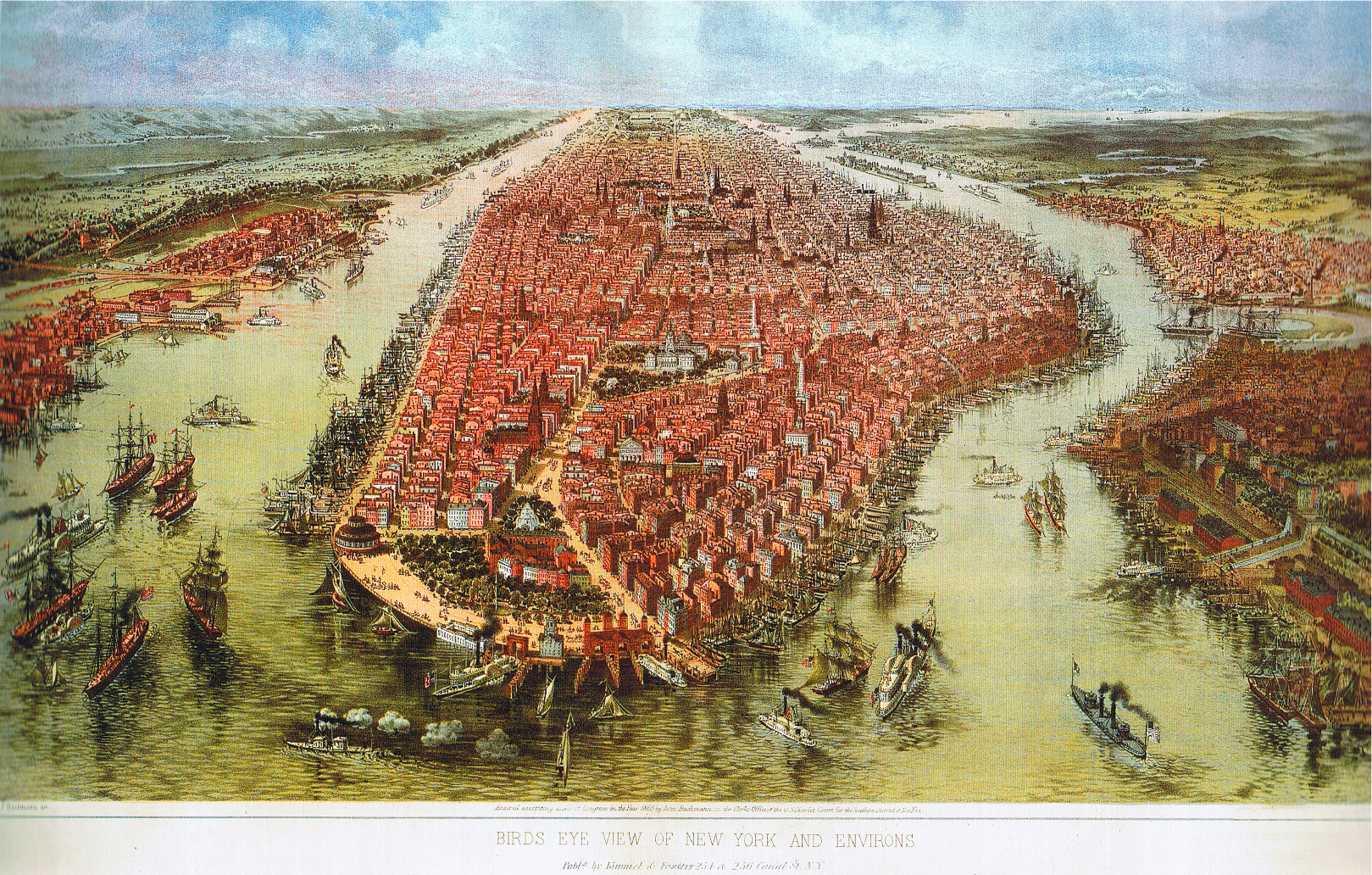
The New York City waterfront where the Hook Gang of river pirates harassed shipping from 1866–1876.

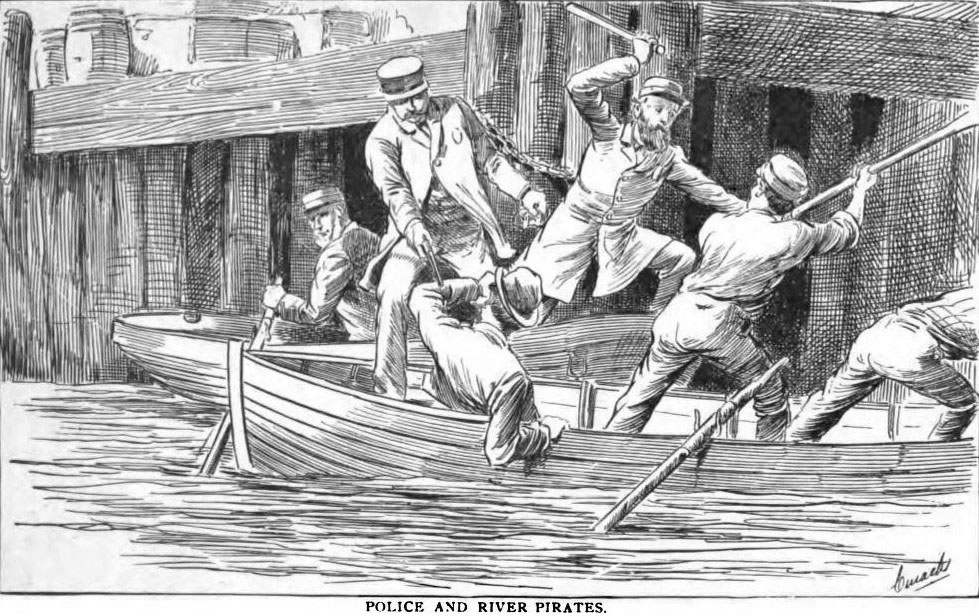
The New York City Police Department's "Steamboat Squad" headed by George Gastlin attacked the Hook Gang of river pirates and permanently broke them up in 1876

The Hook Gang was a street gang, and later a band of river pirates, active in New York City in the 1860s and 1870s. The gang was prominent in the Fourth Ward and Corlear's Hook districts immediately after the American Civil War, until their breakup by the New York City Police Department in 1876.

== History ==
The Hook Gang was formed during the mid-1860s following the American Civil War. Based from New York's Corlear's Hook waterfront on the East River, the gang numbered between 50 and 100 members including James Coffee, Terry Le Strange, Suds Merrick and Tommy Shay. The gang became known for attacking and hijacking shipping. One early robbery took place when James Coffee and Tommy Shay forced a local eight-man rowing club at gunpoint to row the boat to the Brooklyn shore. Within 50 yards of the shore, the rowing team were ordered to jump out and swim to the beach while Coffee and Shay escaped with the boat.

One gang member, Slipsey Ward, was arrested and imprisoned at Auburn Prison after attempting to hijack a schooner sailing past Pike Street, killing three of the six-man crew before he was detained by the remaining crew members.

The gang's downfall occurred when a member by the name of Wallace attempted to hijack a rowboat which contained off-duty police detectives on a fishing trip. After Wallace's arrest, the idea for a Police "Steamboat Squad" was formed. The remaining members of the gang were arrested by police in 1876.

== See also ==
- Charlton Street Gang
- Daybreak Boys
- Patsy Conroy
- Patsy Conroy Gang
- Sadie Farrell
- George Gastlin (Steamboat Squad)
