= Patsy Conroy Gang =

Patsy (Patsey) Conroy Gang
- The Patsy Conroy Gang of river pirates raided ship cargo in the mid-late 19th century along the New York City waterfront.
- Founded by: Patsy Conroy
- Founding location: New York City
- Years active: 1860s–1874
- Territory: Corlears' Hook, New York waterfront
- Ethnicity: predominantly Irish-American
- Membership (est.): 14
- Criminal activities: river piracy, armed robbery
- Rivals: Daybreak Boys, Hook Gang

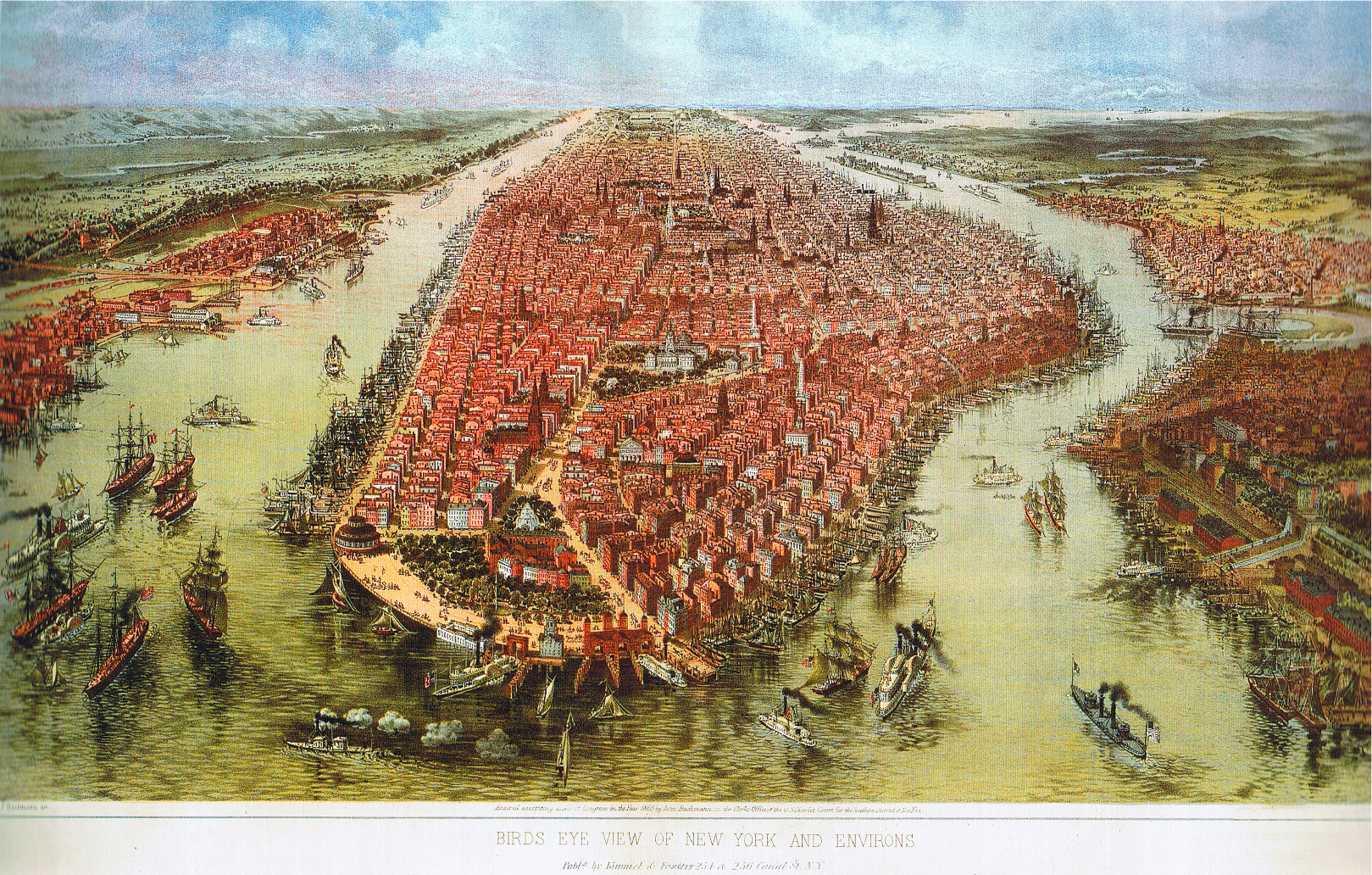
The New York City waterfront where the Patsy Conroy Gang of river pirates harassed shipping from 1860s–1874.

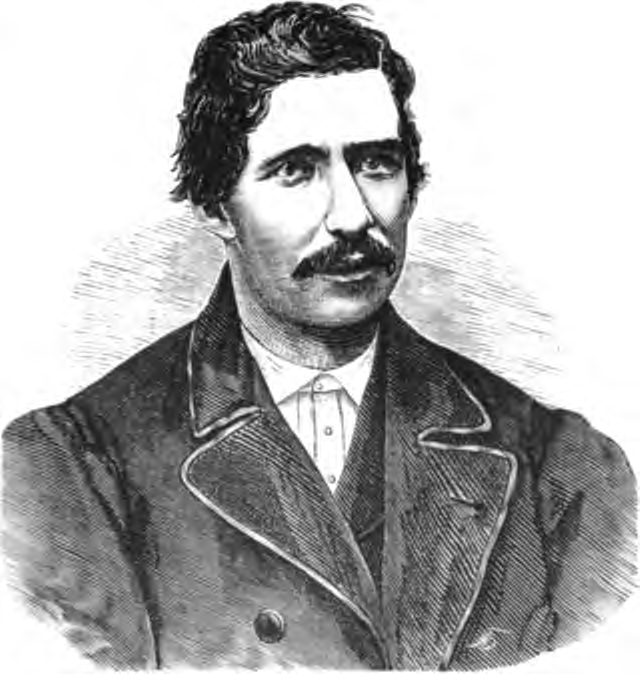
Patsy Conroy the founder and leader of the Patsey Conroy Gang

The Patsey Conroy Gang or Patsy Conroys were a group of river pirates active along the New York City waterfront of the old Fourth Ward during the post-American Civil War era. For nearly twenty years the Patsy Conroys dominated the area of Corlears' Hook and were one of the last major waterfront gangs to remain in the district prior to the formation of the George Gastlin's Steamboat Squad of New York City Police Department. The Patsey Conroy Gang abruptly disappeared when their leaders Patsy Conroy, Larry Griffin and Denny Brady were imprisoned in 1874.

== Early history ==
The gang was originally formed by Patsy Conroy, an experienced river pirate who had previously "operated with great success" along the old Fourth Ward water front, and relocated his gang to the Corlears' Hook district in the early 1870s. Once establishing himself in the area, Conroy began recruiting many of infamous waterfront thieves and criminals including Socco the Bracer, Scotchy Lavelle, Johnny Dobbs, Kid Shanahan, Pugsey Hurley, Wreck Donovan, Tom The Mick, Beeny Kane, Piggy Noles, Billy Woods, Bum Mahoney, Denny Brady and Larry Griffin. Brady and Griffin would later become joint leaders of the gang. Its headquarters was located at a basement dive bar in the Bowery.

== Death of Socco the Bracer ==
On the night of May 29, 1873, gang members Billy Woods, Bum Mahoney and Conroy's chief lieutenant Socco the Bracer stole a small boat from Jackson Street and sailed downstream along the East River to Pier 27 where the brig Margaret was docked and waiting to be loaded with cargo. The three men boarded the ship and, while searching a sea chest, they woke up the captain and his mate. A fight then occurred with the crew and "the gangsters severely beaten and driven over the side into their boat". The skipper had fired several pistol shots into the air to alert police and Patrolmen Musgrave and Kelly, patrolling the river in a rowboat, attempted to catch up with the fleeing pirates but lost them in the fog and darkness.

Musgrave flashed a dark lantern out over the water, searching for any sign of the pirates, and saw a boat slowly pull out from underneath a nearby pier. Mahoney and Woods were both rowing while Socco the Bracer was "standing in the stern with a cocked revolver in his hand". Socco fired at the officer as soon as Musgrave shined his lantern at the pirates. When he missed his target, Mahoney and Woods stopped rowing and also began firing. A brief shootout ensued when police returned fire, Musgrave's first shot hitting Socco below the heart, and Mahoney and Woods "seized their oars and pulled rapidly mid-stream". They then tossed Socco overboard, hoping to lighten the weight of the small boat, but Socco was not yet dead and clung to the side. Through seriously wounded, the shock of the cold water had revived him. He tried to climb back into the boat, holding onto the gunwale, and the pursuing officers could hear Socco begging his companions to take him back aboard.

Woods suggested "they crack him on the knuckles and leave him to drown" but Mahoney relented and dragged him back into the boat. Socco died "before the craft had gone fifty feet" and Mohoney tossed his body overboard once more. The two men managed to escape but Socco's body turned up floating at the foot of Stanton Street "within sight of the dead gangster's home".

== Mattan robbery ==
Though the death of Socco the Bracer had "frightened the Corlears' Hook thugs", six months later the gang made another outing. This time they targeted the Mattan, a brig carrying petroleum, and preparing to sail for Liverpool, England the following day. The Mattan, after receiving its cargo, had sailed down the East River to the Battery where it set anchor off Castle Garden on the afternoon of November 30. The ship was manned by a skeleton crew as Captain T.H. Connauton expected to take on additional men prior to leaving New York.

Shortly after midnight however, seven masked men approached the ship in a small boat and boarded the ship by using a rope which had been left hanging over the side. Once aboard, the river pirates headed aft but one of them tripped over a coil of rope and fell onto the deck alerting the ship's first mate. When he went to investigate the noise, the mate was hit with a slung-shot then bound and gagged. The second mate and the steward were similarly captured.

The pirates then went to the captain's cabin where Connauton, his wife and three children were sleeping. Connauton was awoken by knocking at his door and the pirates, claiming they were members of the harbor police, wished to talk to him. The captain slowly opened the door, but seeing the masked men armed with slung-shots and crowbars, quickly shut the door. One of the pirates fired his revolver at the door which passed through the panel and hit Connauton in the leg. Connauton fell to the floor, and although his wife and children briefly stalled the pirates by barricading the door with furniture, the invaders eventually broke their way inside the cabin.

Confronting Connauton, the men demanded $4,000 in cash which they believed was on board. When the captain refused, the pirates grabbed his wife and threatened to kill her if he did not tell them where the money was hidden. Connauton eventually convinced them that the ship was not carrying $4,000 and, offering $45 instead, the pirates released his wife and began ransacking the cabin. In all, the men had spent an hour on the brig and left having looted a diamond ring, two watches, three gold chains, a ruby ring, and three silk dresses. The dresses had been bought by Mrs. Connauton during her last visit to Liverpool.

The robbery of the Mattan was widely reported in the news. Two days following the robbery, the harbor police arrested two well-known river pirates, Tommy Dagan and Billy Carroll, who were wrongly convicted and imprisoned for the crime. Six months later, police found out that Dagan and Carroll had spent the night at a Water Street dive bar and could not have participated. They were later pardoned.

== Final years ==
Patsy Conroy and his gang were eventually named as suspects in the Mattan robbery, although it was Denny Brady and Larry Griffin who led the group of masked men. As well as the waterfront, the gang also turned to raiding isolated suburban villages in Westchester County along Long Island Sound and occasionally the island itself. The Patsy Conroys relied on these raids more and more as business on the waterfront slowed and for two years "they kept these hamlets in a chronic condition of terror". In 1874, Brady was caught robbing a house in Catskill. That same year, Griffin and Patsy Conroy were also arrested for robbing the home of Robert Emmett in White Plains. All three were sentenced to twenty years' imprisonment. With their leaders in jail, the gang quickly disappeared from the New York underworld.

== See also ==
- Charlton Street Gang
- Daybreak Boys
- Patsy Conroy
- Sadie Farrell
- George Gastlin (Steamboat Squad)
- Hook Gang
- River pirate
