= Charlton Street Gang =

19th-century criminal organization

- The Charlton Street Gang of river pirates raided ship cargo in the mid-late 19th century along the New York City waterfront.
- Founding location: New York City
- Years active: mid–late 1860s
- Territory: New York City, North River, of New York Harbor, Hudson River, from the Harlem River, as far as Poughkeepsie and Albany, New York
- Ethnicity: Irish-American
- Membership (est.): ?
- Criminal activities: theft, river piracy, street fighting, knife fighting, armed robbery, assault, murder, kidnapping

The Charlton Street Gang was a group of river pirates on the Hudson River in New York City during the mid-19th century.

The Charlton Street Gang were one of the earliest river pirate gangs. They raided small cargo ships in the North River of New York Harbor during the post-Civil War period of the 1860s. After a time the ocean liners and major shipping vessels around the Manhattan west side dockyards became so well protected that the gang moved upriver.

In 1869, under the leadership of Sadie the Goat, the gang stole a sloop, and soon began raiding merchant ships and homes along the Hudson River, from the Harlem River as far as Poughkeepsie, New York.

Flying the flag of the Jolly Roger, the gang was extremely successful. They became known for kidnapping wealthy men, women and children for ransom. According to newspapers of the period, Sadie the Goat allegedly had forced several male victims to walk the plank. However, after several victims had been murdered by the gang, local Hudson Valley residents formed a vigilante group. After a number of Charlton Street gang members were killed in a series of violent battles, the gang decided to retreat to the New York waterfront, where they returned to street crime. They eventually dissolved by the end of the decade.

== Gallery ==
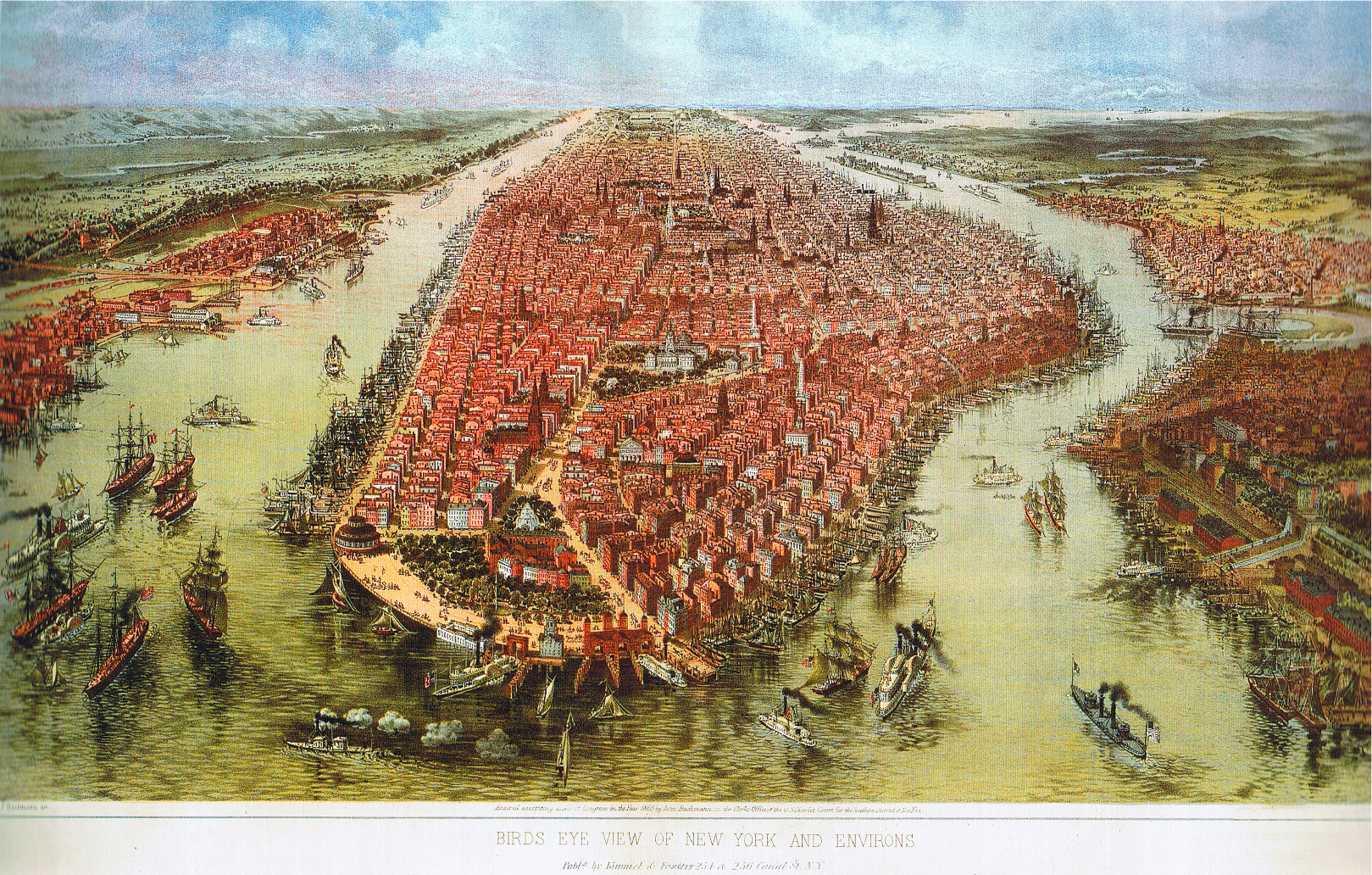
The New York City waterfront where "Sadie the Goat" Farrell the leader of the Charlton Street Gang harassed shipping in the 1860s.

== See also ==
- Daybreak Boys
- Patsy Conroy
  - Patsy Conroy Gang
- Sadie Farrell
- George Gastlin (Steamboat Squad)
- Hook Gang
