= Sadie Farrell =

Irish American criminal

- Occupations: thief, river pirate, kidnapper, criminal gang leader
- Known for: New York gang leader and river pirate; leader of the Charlton Street Gang (1869)

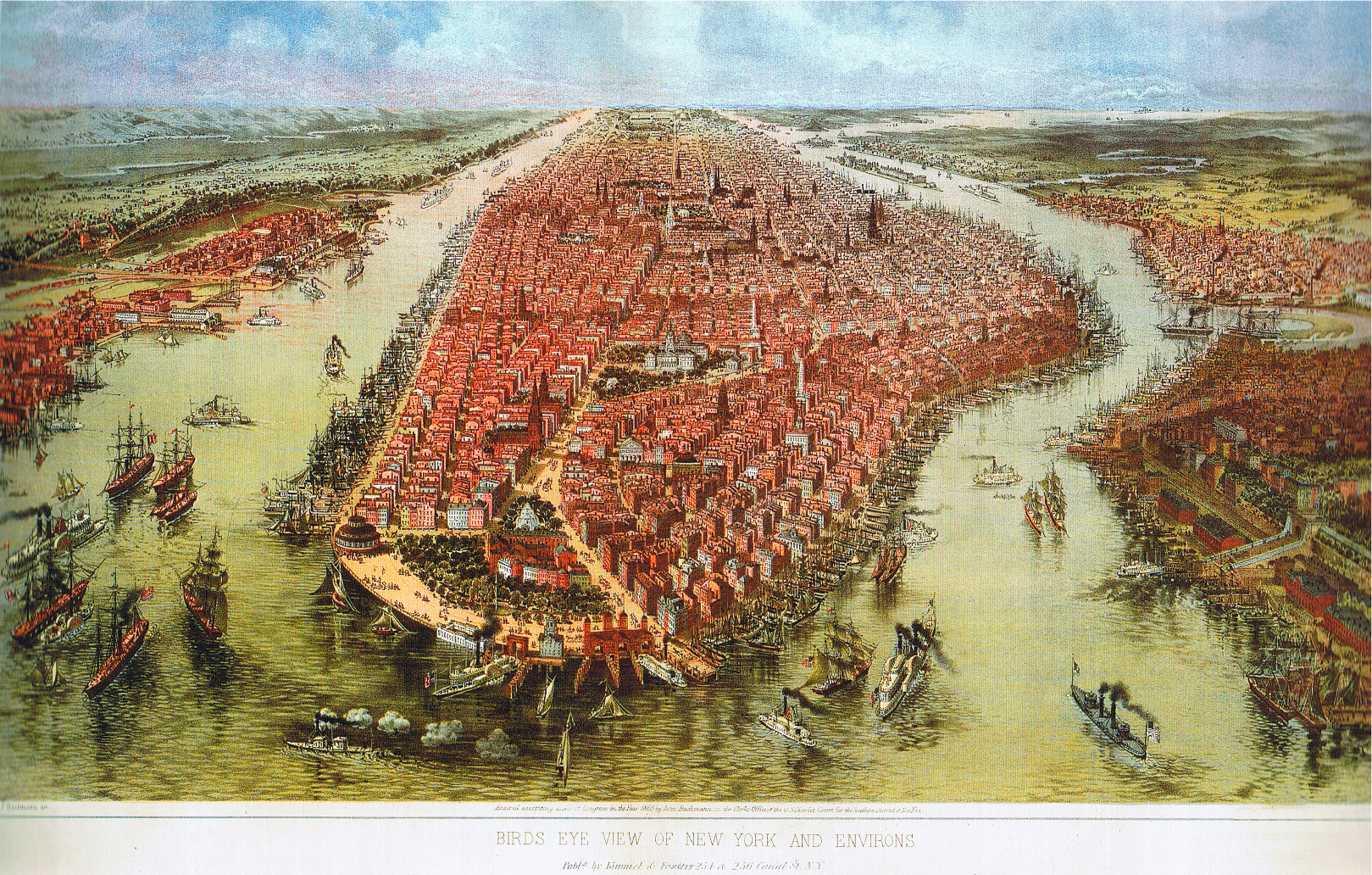
The New York City waterfront where the "Sadie the Goat" Farrell and the Charlton Street Gang of river pirates harassed shipping in the 1860s.

The Charlton Street Gang of river pirates raided ship cargo in the mid-late 19th century along the New York City waterfront.

Sadie Farrell (fl. 1869) was an alleged semi-folklorish American criminal, gang leader and river pirate known under the pseudonym Sadie the Goat.

== Criminal career ==
She is believed to have been a vicious street mugger in New York's "Bloody" Fourth Ward. Upon encountering a lone traveler, she would headbutt like a charging goat a man in the stomach, and her male accomplice would hit the victim with a slungshot and then rob him. Sadie, according to popular underworld lore, was engaged in a long-time feud with a tough, six-feet-tall female bouncer known as Gallus Mag, who finally bit off Sadie's ear in a bar fight, as Mag was known to do, albeit usually with male trouble-makers.

Folklore has it that, leaving the area in disgrace, she ventured to the waterfront area in West Side Manhattan. It was while wandering the dockyards in the spring of 1869 that she witnessed members of the Charlton Street Gang unsuccessfully attempting to board a small sloop anchored in mid-river. Watching the men being driven back across the river by a handful of the ship's crew, she offered her services to the men and became the gang's leader. Within days, she engineered the successful hijacking of a larger sloop and, with "the Jolly Roger flying from the masthead", she and her crew reputedly sailed up and down the Hudson and Harlem Rivers raiding small villages, robbing farm houses and riverside mansions, and occasionally kidnapping men, women, and children for ransom. She was said to have made several male prisoners "walk the plank".

She and her men continued their activities for several months and stashed their cargo in several hiding spots until they could be gradually disposed of through fences and pawn shops along the Hudson and East Rivers. By the end of the summer, the farmers had begun resisting the raids, attacking landing parties with gunfire. The group abandoned the sloop and Sadie returned to the Fourth Ward, where she was now known as the "Queen of the Waterfront". She then claimed to have made a truce with Gallus Mag, who returned Sadie's ear. Mag had displayed it in a pickled jar in the bar. Sadie kept the ear in a locket and wore it around her neck for the rest of her life.

== See also ==
- Charlton Street Gang
- Daybreak Boys
- Gallus Mag
- George Gastlin (Steamboat Squad)
- Hell-Cat Maggie
- Hook Gang
- Patsy Conroy
- Patsy Conroy Gang
- River pirate
