= Boiled Oysters Malloy =

American saloon keeper, thief and underworld figure

- Occupation: Saloon keeper
- Known for: New York saloon keeper and Bowery underworld figure during the mid-to late 19th century.

Boiled (Biled) Oysters Malloy (fl. 1850 –1870) was the pseudonym of an American saloon keeper, thief and underworld figure in New York City during the mid-to late 19th century. He was especially known in The Bowery where he ran a popular basement bar and underworld hangout, located on Centre Street near the Tombs, known as The Ruins where "three drops of terrible whiskey were sold for a dime". His establishment was one of several owned by popular Bowery characters, most notably Mush Riley, whose dive bar was located just a few doors away from The Ruins. Malloy's nickname was derived from "his love of boiled oysters", and, according to Frank Moss in The American Metropolis from Knickerbocker Days to the Present Time (1897), when his mother commented on his diamonds and fine clothes would respond "Arrah, mother, I've struck it. I'm living on biled oysters."

A criminal associate of Patsy Conroy and his gang, Malloy was involved in an incident with Conroy, Bill Cummings and Charley Mosher one night at a Hester Street dive bar in the Bowery. All four had been wounded, the most serious being Conroy who was shot in the arm and Cummings in the chest, while Mosher and Malloy had only minor injuries. Shortly after their arrival, local thief Jim McGuire entered the bar with some recently stolen goods. McGuire, in high spirits, bought a round of drinks for the four men. A verbal altercation between Cummings and McGuire led to Conroy demanding a percentage of McGuire's merchandise. When McGuire tried to leave, he was stopped and attacked with Malloy and his companions helping themselves to McGuire's goods.
