= Wreck Donovan =

- Born: Michael Mahoney
- Other names: The Wreck
- Occupation: Criminal
- Known for: New York sneak thief, river pirate, gang leader and underworld figure; he was a member of the Patsy Conroy Gang.
- Height: 5 ft 8 in (1.73 m)

Michael Mahoney, better known as Wreck Donovan or simply The Wreck, (fl. 1869–1949) was a nineteenth-century American sneak thief, river pirate and underworld figure in New York City. He was a well-known criminal for hire on the New York waterfront during the post-American Civil War era and later became a member of Patsy Conroy Gang.

Mahoney also participated in a number of violent robberies during the early-1870s, including his time leading a group of Fourth Ward railroad thieves, although he usually escaped punishment due to his political connections to Tammany Hall. These activities, however, would lead to his eventual imprisonment by New York District Attorneys Benjamin K. Phelps and Horace Russell in 1873.

== Biography ==
Michael Mahoney was born in the old Fourth Ward in Manhattan. He began his criminal career while still a young child and became a skilled thief within a few years. He regularly visited the underworld den known as Slaughter-house Point, so named because of the alleged murders that occurred within the establishment, located at the corner of James Slip and Water Street. It was there that he learned his trade from notorious criminal figures such as Johnny Dobbs, Jack Lowry, John McClosky, Soldier Brown and others. By early adulthood, Mahoney had risen from a low-level dock rat to a criminal whose name had "become known to every detective in the country". His portrait (No. 688) was eventually added to the Rogue's Gallery at the Central Office of the New York Police Department.

In the years following the American Civil War, Mahoney established himself as a much feared criminal figure on the New York waterfront and eventually recruited by Patsy Conroy to join his gang of river pirates. During this period, Mahoney also worked with Thomas Cummings, Denis Brady, Joe Dollard, Martin Broderick, Sam Lake, John "Johnny the Greek" Keefe and Abe Coakley among others. He and Broderick staged the successful escape of Coakley from the state penitentiary in 1869. From the city-side of the East River, the two men signaled a guard-boat carrying Coakley by waving handkerchiefs. The keeper, believing it was a doctor who wanted the boat, stopped to pick him up. When the boat docked, however, Mahoney and Broderick drew their revolvers and held the guard at gunpoint while Coakley jumped ashore and escaped.

Shortly afterwards, Mahoney and Broderick were involved in the robbery of a messenger boy of Stevens Bank in Hoboken, New Jersey. The bank messenger was robbed by the two men while travelling to the Stevens floating battery. After knocking him "senseless" with a sandbag, they jumped into a boat in waiting and rowed back to New York. Their escape was short-lived as they were quickly apprehended by Hoboken Police Chief Charles A. Donovan. A subsequent investigation found that Mahoney and Broderick had rented rooms across from the bank and watched the messenger for weeks waiting for the perfect opportunity to make their move. Due to the messengers injuries, he was unable to identify his assailants and Mahoney and Donovan were discharged. A year later, he was convicted with Denis Brady and Thomas Cummings for nearly beating to death local merchant Albert Bornowsky. Mahoney's political influence with Tammany Hall resulted in a mere six-month prison sentence.

By early 1873, Mahoney was the leader of a gang of railroad thieves in the Fourth Ward. On April 5, Mahoney assaulted Peter R. Corson while boarding a Third Avenue street car with his small son. Mahoney, with two other gang members, blocked the front platform and then grabbed him by the neck and stole a pocketbook which had $45. The gang leader was later arrested and brought before the Court of General Sessions later that month. Assistant District Attorney Horace Russell prosecuted the case and said, in his opening statement, that Mahoney was "one of a class of villains who should be taught that the railroads of the City were intended for the conveyance of honest citizens, and not for the operations of gangs of thieves". Russell and his team vowed to "spare no pains" in bringing these men to justice. Mahoney was found guilty by Recorder John K. Hackett and sentenced to 20 years imprisonment at the New York State Prison. Prior to his conviction, John Keefe and Abe Coakley used "every underhanded effort" to save Donovan from incarceration but were prevented in their efforts by District Attorney Benjamin K. Phelps.
