= Big Sue =

American brothel owner

Big Sue or Sue, the Turtle was the pseudonym of a 19th-century African-American saloon and brothelkeeper in the notorious Arch Block, which ran between Grand Street and Broome Street in New York's 4th Ward. She was thought to also be involved in criminal activities.

Sue weighed 350 lbs and a contemporary journalist likened her to a big black turtle standing on its hind legs, from which she gained her turtle nickname.

== Dive Bar ==
Sue's dive bar and brothel was the first in New York to offer 24 hour brothel services. Although thievery among many of the city's taverns and saloons was rampant, Sue was considered to be honest, although the women who worked for her were not on occasions. On one occasion she is reputed to have wandered the streets at 1 am to try and get change for a customer who had given her a $100 note. Failing to obtain the change, she delivered the money and customer to a policeman, fearing that the customer was so intoxicated he might lose the money or get robbed.

== New York Draft Riots ==
During the New York Draft Riots in 1863, Sue's dive was attacked by women from the Five Points. The women working there fled, but Sue, too large to run, was attacked and "frightfully beaten" by a group of Irishwomen. Other sources claim she was one of five black women lynched and hung from lampposts. The bar was looted and its liquor was confiscated and distributed amongst the rioters before the building was destroyed.

== Bibliography ==
- Asbury, Herbert (2002). The Gangs of New York: An Informal History of the Underworld. Arrow. ISBN 978-0-09-943674-4.
- Crapsey, Edward (1872). The Nether Side of New York: Or, The Vice, Crime and Poverty of the Great Metropolis. Sheldon & Company. "sue."
- McCague, James (1968). The Second Rebellion: The Story of the New York City Draft Riots of 1863. Dial Press. ISBN 9780803777149.
- Nash, Jay Robert (1981). Almanac of world crime. Anchor Press/Doubleday. ISBN 978-0-385-15003-3.
- New American Mercury Volume 12. American Mercury. 1927.
- O’Brien, Martin; Tzanelli, Rodanthi; Yar, Majid; Penna, Sue (January 2005). ""The Spectacle of Fearsome Acts": Crime in the Melting P(l)ot in Gangs of New York". Critical Criminology. 13 (1): 17–35. doi:10.1007/s10612-004-6111-9. S2CID 143968620.
