= Patrick Conroy =

Patrick Conroy is the name of:

- Patrick J. Conroy (born 1950), 60th Chaplain of the United States House of Representatives
- Pat Conroy (1945–2016), author
- Patsy Conroy (Patrick Conroy, c. 1846–?), American burglar and river pirate
- Pat Conroy (politician) (born 1979), Australian politician
