= Pugsey Hurley =

English-born American burglar, river pirate and underworld figure

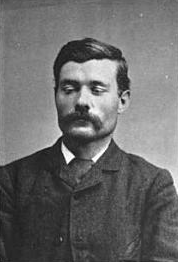
- Born: Michael Hurley; 1846; England, United Kingdom
- Died: after 1886
- Other names: Pugsy Hurley, Pugsey Reilly, Pugsey Hanley
- Occupation: Criminal
- Known for: Burglar, river pirate and underworld figure in New York City during the late 19th century; member of the Patsy Conroy Gang.
- Height: 5 ft 7 in (1.70 m)

Michael "Pugsey" Hurley (1846 – after 1886), also known by the aliases Pugsey Reilly or Hanley, was an English-born American burglar, river pirate and underworld figure in New York City during the mid-to late 19th century. An old time thief from the old Seventh Ward, he was also a well-known waterfront thug whose criminal career lasted over two decades. He especially gained notoriety as a member of the Patsy Conroy Gang and was a principal figure in many of their most infamous crimes.

== Biography ==
Michael Hurley was born in England in 1846. He was a trained machinist and later emigrated to the United States. Settling in New York City, however, he became involved in the criminal underworld. Hurley was described by former NYPD police detective Thomas F. Byrnes as "Forty years old in 1886. Born in England. Medium build. Machinist by trade. Height, 5 feet 7 inches. Weight, 135 pounds. Brown hair, hazel eyes, fair complexion, pug nose. Has an eagle, with star underneath, in India ink, on inside of right arm."

A notorious thief in the old Seventh Ward, he also established himself on the New York waterfront in the years following the American Civil War. Hurley was eventually recruited by Patsy Conroy into his band of river pirates when the gang leader relocated from the Fourth Ward to Corlears' Hook at the end of the decade. He was part of Conroy's raids against New Rochelle, New York with several other members including Dan Kelly, Larry Griffin, Big John Garvey, Frank Kayton, Frank Woods, Shang Campbell, Mike Kerrigan, John O'Donnell, John Orr, Dennis Brady and George Maillard during late 1873. One of the gang's first major robberies took place on October 17, 1873, when they invaded the home of wealthy farmer Abraham Post located on the Hudson River three miles from Catskill Village. The men tied up the occupants and looted the house carrying off bonds, jewelry and other property worth $3,000. Two months later, on December 20, Hurley and other gang members ambushed the watchman at the East New York depot of the Jamaica, Woodhaven and Brooklyn Railroad. They tied up the watchman, blew up the safe and escaped with $4,000 in cash.

Their most publicized crime, one which would eventually result in Hurley's imprisonment, came three days later with the burglary and home invasion of J.P. Emmett's country estate, popularly known as "The Cottage", at Pelham near New Rochelle. On the night of December 23, 1873, Hurley and several others under Conroy broke into the house with the intention of burglarizing the residence. Upon finding the house occupied, the masked burglars surprised Emmett, his nephew and servants then had them bound and gagged while they ransacked the house. The gang escaped with goods worth $750. Less than a week later, Hurley took part in another robbery with the same group of men. William K. Souter, his family and servants were all awoken by the burglars in the middle of the night and threatened with their lives. All heavily armed, they had little trouble in forcing Souter to surrender his valuables.

== Final escape and recapture ==
Conroy's raids terrified the region and nearly all the suburban villages on the Hudson River cooperated to defend themselves against further attacks, and formed vigilance committees. With the exception of one or two members who had established alibis nearly ever single participant were apprehended by police and sentenced to 20 years imprisonment. Hurley was arrested on August 15, 1874, tried and convicted in White Plains, New York and given a 20-year prison term by Judge Tappan on October 1, 1874. He made a failed attempt to escape from Auburn prison in the spring of 1876, and again in 1877, and was finally transferred to the asylum at Clinton prison by feigning insanity. He made another unsuccessful escape attempt shortly after his arrival, declared "cured" following a re-examination, and returned to Auburn. He made several more attempts to escape and, with outside help, broke out in April 1882. He was captured by police in New York City, on the corner of Washington and Liberty Streets, on August 1, 1882, and handed over to prison authorities the next day. Hurley was subsequently taken back to prison to serve his unexpired 12-year term. He was among a number of career criminals profiled by Thomas Byrnes in ''1886 Professional Criminals of America (1886).
