= Joseph Gayles =

American river pirate

- Born: c. 1844
- Died: May 29, 1873 (aged 28–29); New York Harbor, New York, U.S.
- Body discovered: June 4, 1873; New York Harbor
- Piratical career
- Nickname: Socco the Bracer
- Type: River pirate
- Allegiance: Patsy Conroy Gang
- Base of operations: New York City

Joseph Gayles (c. 1844 – May 29, 1873), also known as Socco the Bracer, was one of the leaders of the Patsy Conroy Gang which plagued the dockyards of the New York City waterfront during the 1860s and 1870s. Described by New York police as one of the most vicious criminals on the docks, Gayles was suspected to be responsible for the murders of at least 20 men. According to one account, after finding little worth stealing in a raid on a brig, Gayles tied a sailor to a sea chest filled with sugar and heaved the chest overboard along with the sailor as he and three other members of the gang watched the man drown.

On the night of May 29, 1873, Gayles sailed out into New York Harbor with Danny "Bummer" Mahoney and Billy Woods with the intention of raiding the brig Margaret while waiting to be loaded with cargo. While successfully sneaking on board, the captain and two crew members were awakened while the three river pirates were attempting to open a sea chest. After fighting with the crew, the three men were forced to flee and managed to sail away disappearing in the fog.

As they attempted to sail to shore however, Gayles and his accomplices were spotted by a police patrol in a rowboat and, exchanging fire with the officers, Gayles was shot in the chest. As the two other gang members continued to row, Woods told Mahoney to dump Gayles overboard to lighten their weight in an attempt to outrun their pursuers.

Gayles managed to swim back to the boat and, despite Woods' calls to beat the gang leader's knuckles with the oar; Mahoney pulled Gayles back on. He soon died however, and the two men once again threw him over the side as they made their escape. His body was found floating in the East River over a week later on June 7.
