= Dan Noble =

English-American gentleman burglar, confidence man, sneak thief and pickpocket

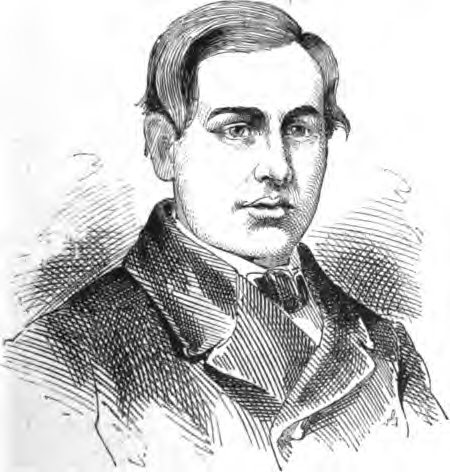
- Born: 1846; England, United Kingdom
- Died: Unknown
- Other name: Daniel Dyson
- Occupation: Criminal
- Known for: English-born thief, burglar and pickpocket in the United States during the 19th century.

Dan Noble, also known as Daniel Dyson, (1846-?) was an English gentleman burglar, confidence man, sneak thief and pickpocket active in the United States during the mid-to late 19th century. One of the most notorious criminals in New York City, he was involved in several major robberies in the post-American Civil War era. Among his exploits included the daylight robbery of the Royal Insurance Company in 1866 and was an alleged participant in the theft of $1,000,000 from industrialist Rufus L. Lord arranged by George Leonidas Leslie in 1876.

== Biography ==
=== Early life and criminal career ===
Dan Noble was born in England and immigrated to the United States in 1857, when not yet properly into his teens. His parents followed shortly after and his father opened a porterhouse on the corner of Twenty-Fourth Street and Ninth Avenue. It soon became a popular spot for thieves, burglars and other underworld figures, where Noble became closely associated with the "Long Doctor", "Big" Jack Connolly and Johnny Murphy under whose tutelage he was encouraged to enter the trade himself. In his first attempt at burglary however, he was caught trying to rob a house on East Twenty-Third Street, and had in his possession nippers, a jimmy and a skeleton key. Although these were the tools used by an experienced thief, it was later found that the 15-year-old Noble had borrowed the tools from an elderly thief who was boarding with his father. Because of his youth and lack of a criminal record, as well as some outside influence, the charges against him were dropped.

Noble continued to be involved in burglary, but eventually became a butcher as he reached adulthood. Although he was successful in this trade, he was drawn back into crime after becoming acquainted with a group of "till-tappers", Jimmy Price and brothers Fred, Scott and George Newton, whom he later joined. After a time learning under them, he returned to burglary and also pickpocketing. He felt more comfortable as a pickpocket apparently believing the activity to require less skill and provided lower risk for arrest. He typically targeted young women, as well as men on occasion. "He considered it required less skill, less adroitness, and less nerve to slip his fingers into a woman's pocket, and secure the contents, than to jump into a basement and scurry off with whatever he could catch."

Despite his success, he was arrested twice in a two-year period while in the pocket picking line. He was released on these two occasions but was sentenced to six months at Blackwell's Island. Shortly after his release, he became partners with Hettie Thompson, sister of the infamous Maria Thompson, and they traveled together throughout the country.

He later headed a group of sneak thieves including Jimmy Griffin, Frank Knapp and Jack Tierney, whose activities he planned and financed. Though primarily based in New York City, they were also active in other major cities across the country. One of the most celebrated thieves in the city at this time, he was once invited to an underworld gathering hosted by saloonkeeper Mush Riley. It was at this banquet that the guest were treated to a mystery main course which Riley later revealed to be a Newfoundland dog. He operated with a great deal of cooperation from the New York Police Department, reportedly having as many as 30 police officers on his payroll, until his eventual arrest.

=== Encounter with Allen Pinkerton ===
Noble ran a faro house on Broadway during the American Civil War, as well a faro bank with Charles Brockway. It was during this time that he fell prey to a practical joke by Allen Pinkerton, famed detective and founder of the Pinkerton Detective Agency. Pinkerton, then head of the US Secret Service, was originally in New York visiting Colonel Thomas Key. On the day of his arrival, he checked into the St. Nicholas late in the afternoon and planned to meet with Key at the Fifth Avenue Hotel later that evening. He intended to return to Washington, DC that same night or early the next morning however, while wandering around the rotunda and public rooms of the hotel Pinkerton was approached by two men. Instantly recognizing the two as confidence men, their old con games well known to the veteran detective, Pinkerton played along allowing the men to lure him to Noble's faro house nearby. He convinced the men that he was an army contractor, in town to buy a thousand cavalry horses, and implied that he was carrying a considerable sum. Upon gaining entry into the gambling resort, and armed with a pistol concealed in his pocket, he bided his time as the two "steerers" as well as other gamblers encouraged him to play. He eventually announced that was leaving, claiming that he did not understand the games, to which the dealers protested including Noble. Inviting the confidence man to have a drink with him at the bar, causing some surprise and confusion among the patrons. Noble hesitantly agreed; however, he soon became suspicious demanding to know his identity. Pinkerton obliged Noble by identifying he and others in the room as gamblers, swindlers and other criminals. When Noble then asked if Pinkerton was after him or anyone else, Pinkerton replied he had not and casually dismissed himself to the astonishment of the crowd.

=== Robbery of the Royal Insurance Company ===
On December 10, 1866, the Broadway office of the Liverpool and London-based Royal Insurance Company was robbed of over a quarter of a million dollars in bonds. The day of the robbery, a meeting of the American company directors was to take place at noon. At half-past 10:00 am, a tin box containing $25,000 in government bonds and negotiable securities was brought to the firm's office from the Merchants' Bank. Although deposited and kept in its vaults for safekeeping, it was customary at these meetings for the board of directors to use or inspect the box for any change in stock. The box was placed in the vault opening from the back room of the office of company agent Anthony B. McDonald. The inner iron door of the safe was closed but not locked.

At around 11:20 am, two well-dressed men respectable looking men entered the building expressing an interest in life insurance and were shown into McDonalds's office. One of the men, described as "a young man about 30 years of age and having the appearance of an able commercial traveler on a fine salary", took a seat on the opposite side of the table of McDonald and immediately began speaking to him about terms of life insurance policies. He then explained that he and several others were preparing to go down the Mississippi River to New Orleans on business for their respective companies and were interested in obtaining life insurance during their extended trip to the South. The young man continued further by stating that he and his group were as yet undecided whether they should take a "traveler's risk" or purchase insurance. He himself was in favor of getting life insurance as he claimed to be a married man. His companion also commented occasionally and supported his claim that the young man had been appointed the group's spokesman and would negotiate the terms of the policies. While the young man and the agent continued speaking, the second man excused himself and left the room for a few moments.

The vault was situated to one side and to the rear of McDonald's office. The agent was, at this time, engrossed in tables and statements which he displayed for the young man and from which he calculated from a table of risks so as to satisfy the inquiries of his potential client. Meanwhile, the second man spent a few moments and walked the halls examining various portraits and other ornaments hanging on the walls. He returned to the office where he casually informed his friend that he would have to leave or would miss an important appointment. Agreeing to meet him later during the day, the second man wished the men a good day and left the office. A few minutes later, the young man concluded his business with the agent, thanking him for his kindness and attention, and promised to call him after consulting his friends.

The meeting was held as scheduled and at the time the directors were to examine the box, it was found to be missing. An alarm was quickly raised and police quickly deduced that the two gentlemen served to distract McDonald while sneak thieves infiltrated the office and stole the tin box. These men were under the employ of Noble who somehow found out about the meeting and was believed to have planned the operation. He and Jack Tierney waited outside in a horse-drawn carriage, either to take off with the box or to provide the thieves to escape if they were caught, while the two salesmen Frank Knapp and Jimmy Griffin posed as the salesmen who spoke to McDonald. Knapp stayed in the office with McDonald, purposely taking a seat in which McDonald's back was to the vault, while Griffin excused himself then slipped back into the office where he took the box from the vault. He returned to the office, with the box hidden under his overcoat, and said he had to go out for a few minutes. Griffin met Noble and Tierney outside to delivering the box then returned to the office where he made his excuses and left the building with Knapp following soon after.

=== Later years ===
Noble and his partners went into hiding immediately following the robbery. Knapp and Griffin fled to Canada on the advice of Noble; however, there was a falling out between the men when their shares amounted to $27,000 each. This was a meager sum considering the heist netted over a quarter of a million dollars. The argument between Noble and his partners eventually led to his arrest, conviction and brief imprisonment. The insurance company eventually recovered $55,000 bonds, on payment of a premium or reward of 15%.

Noble eluded authorities for over four years until his arrest and conviction in Oswego, New York in February 1871. His wealth, by this time, had all been used up during his time on the run and his trial. Noble was sentenced to ten years imprisonment at Sing Sing but escaped after serving less than a year. According to an alternate version by George W. Walling, former police chief of the New York Police Department, Noble was sentenced to five years imprisonment for a burglary in Elmira, New York when he became acquainted with Jimmy Hope and James Brady while in Auburn State Prison and eventually escaped with them. He fled to England soon after where he was largely associated with "sporting swells". He visited France for a brief time, on the Paris Bourse in 1873, he was caught attempting to rob a broker's office and sentenced to five years penal servitude. Released after serving his sentence, he was liberated in time to attend the Paris Exposition in the summer of 1878.

He eventually moved back to England where he was eventually convicted for forgery, arrested after attempting to use bank notes printed by forger George Engles at a London bank, and sentenced to twenty years imprisonment. He served roughly half of his term, his health failing in his old age, and died in prison. Reports say he died in August 1883.
