= William Riley (criminal) =

American businessman, saloonkeeper and underworld figure

- Known for: Five Points saloon keeper and underworld figure.

William "Mush" Riley (fl. 1870–1878) was an American businessman, saloonkeeper and underworld figure in Manhattan, New York during the late 19th century. The owner of a Centre Street dive, he was a longtime Five Points personality and associated with many noted criminals of the era. Riley was said to have acquired his name for his fondness of eating corn meal mush dipped in hot brandy. His saloon was located near other Five Points characters such as English-born pickpocket Tommy Taylor, bare-knuckle boxer Jack McManus and Boiled Oysters Malloy, who owned the popular basement resort known as The Ruins just a few doors from Riley's place.

Riley, according to underworld lore, once served an extravagant dinner to Dan Noble, Mike Byrnes, Dutch Heinrichs and others. When his guests complimented him on the meal, noting the odd flavor of the main course, Riley revealed they had been served a stew made from a Newfoundland dog.

On July 15, 1878, Riley was apprehended by Canadian authorities in Toronto and taken back to the United States where he was charged with complicity in a street car robbery in Troy, New York that had resulted in the garroting of a John Buckley two weeks earlier. Five others were also arrested for their involvement in the robbery, most notably the group's ringleader, Will Tomkins.
