= Kid Shanahan =

- Born: Joseph A. Shanahan
- Other names: Thomas Lynch
- Occupation: Criminal
- Known for: New York river pirate and member of the Patsy Conroy Gang

Joseph A. "Kid" Shanahan (fl. 1873 – 1883), also known as Thomas Lynch, was an American criminal, river pirate and member of the Patsy Conroy Gang. In May 1883, he was convicted with Thomas J. Reily, James McMann and James Moran of the attempted robbery of the sloop Victor while anchored at Flushing Bay. Upon boarding the vessel, they were forced to jump overboard at gunpoint by the ship's mate John Williams, although he rescued three of the would-be assailants from drowning while the gang's leader Moran was picked up by Captain Price of the nearby sloop Rebecca. Held in The Tombs in place of a $3,000 bail, Shanahan was tried for burglary and felonious assault, pleading guilty to all charges. He was sentenced to ten years imprisonment at Sing Sing Prison.
