= River pirate =

Pirate who operates along a river

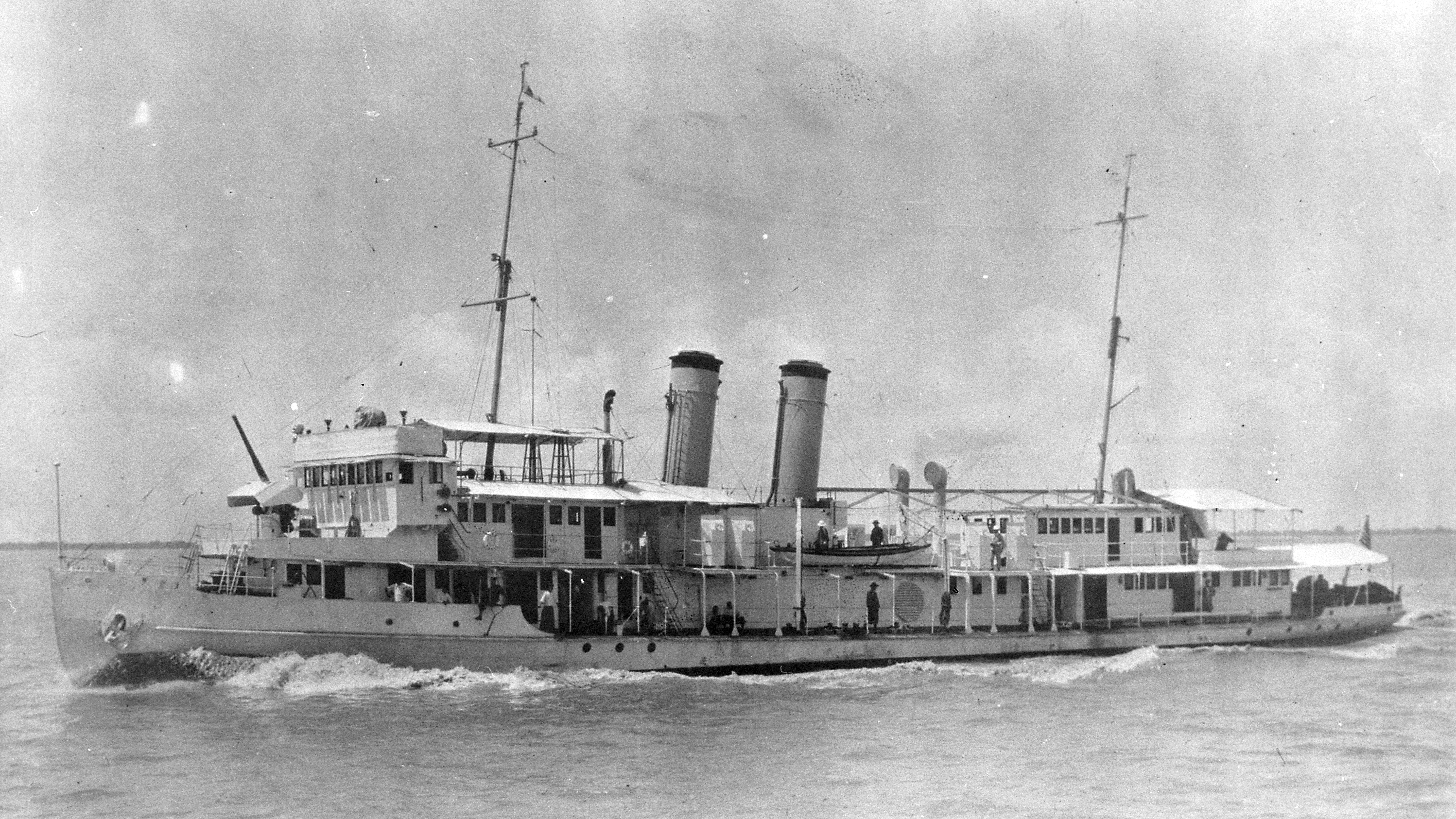
The USS Panay, a United States Navy river gunboat, part of the brown-water navy, which served on the Yangtze Patrol, hunting for river pirates and Chinese insurgents, on the Yangtze River, in China. The Imperial Japanese Army ultimately sunk the Panay in 1937, known as the Panay Incident.

A river pirate is a pirate who operates along a river. The term has been used to describe many different kinds of pirate groups who carry out riverine attacks in Asia, Africa, Europe, North America, and South America. They are usually prosecuted under national, not international law.

== Asia ==
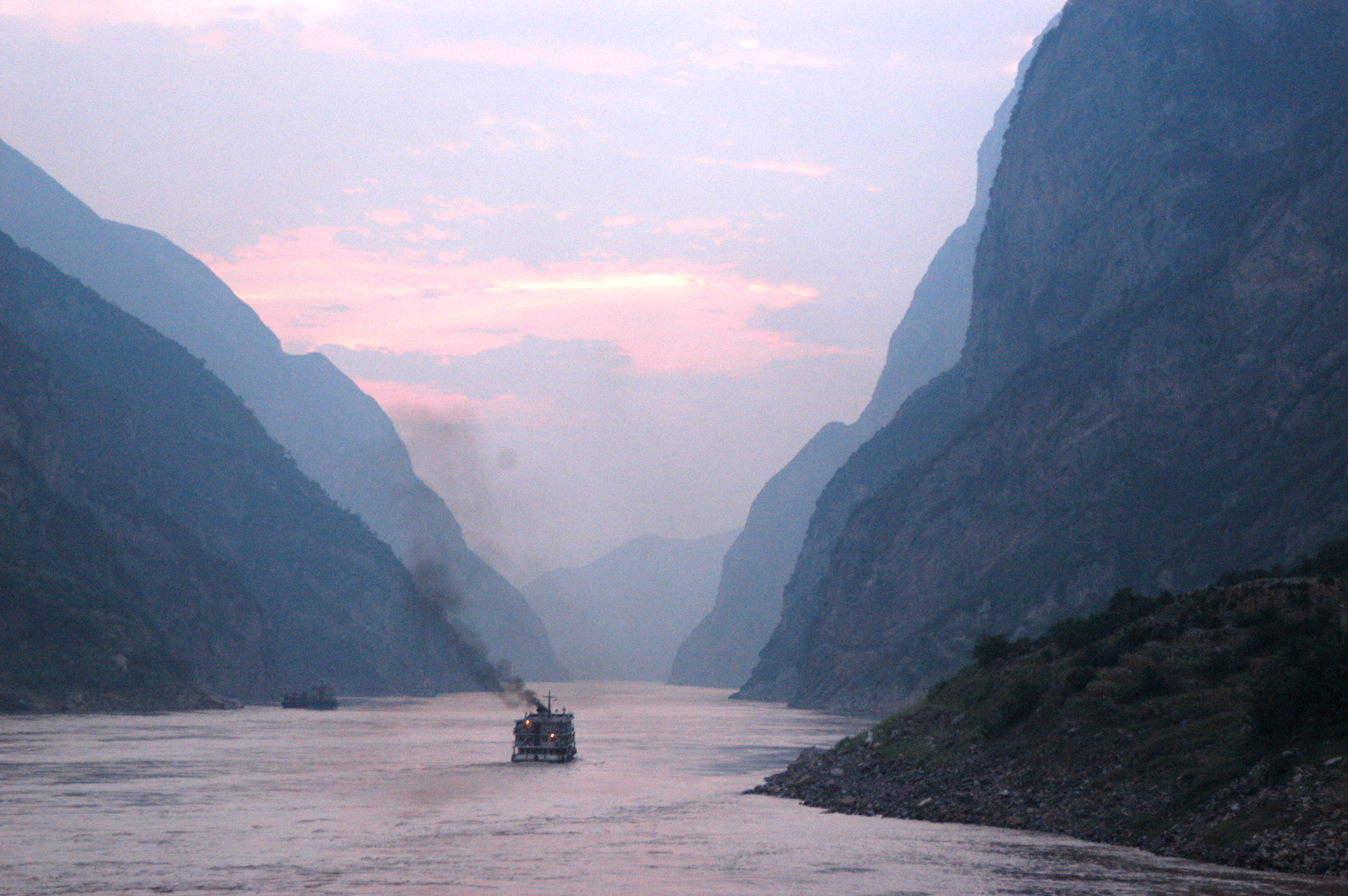
The Yangtze River of China, a hotbed of river pirate activity from the nineteenth century until the end of the Chinese Civil War in 1949, which was combated by patrols of American and European gunboat flotillas.

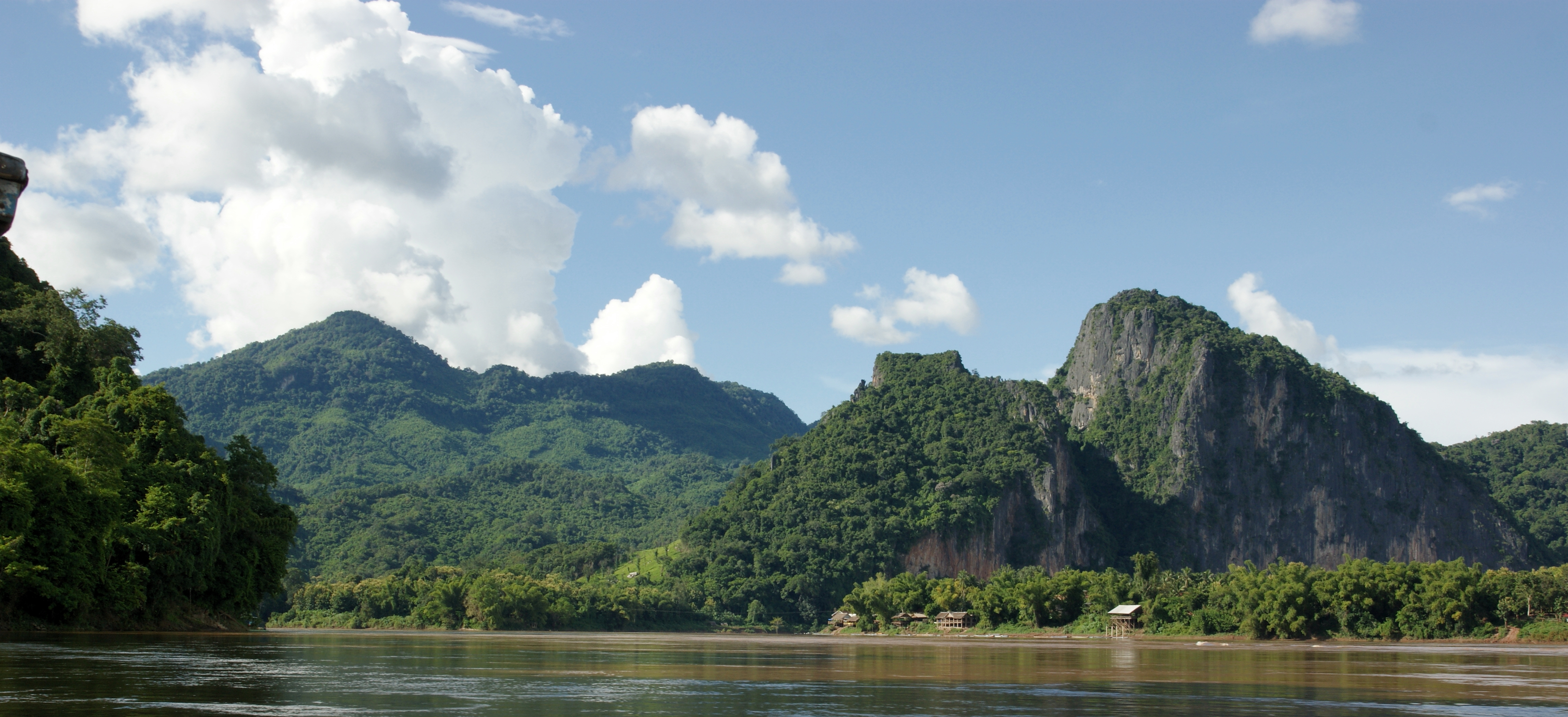
The Mekong River, where modern-day Asian river piracy exists.

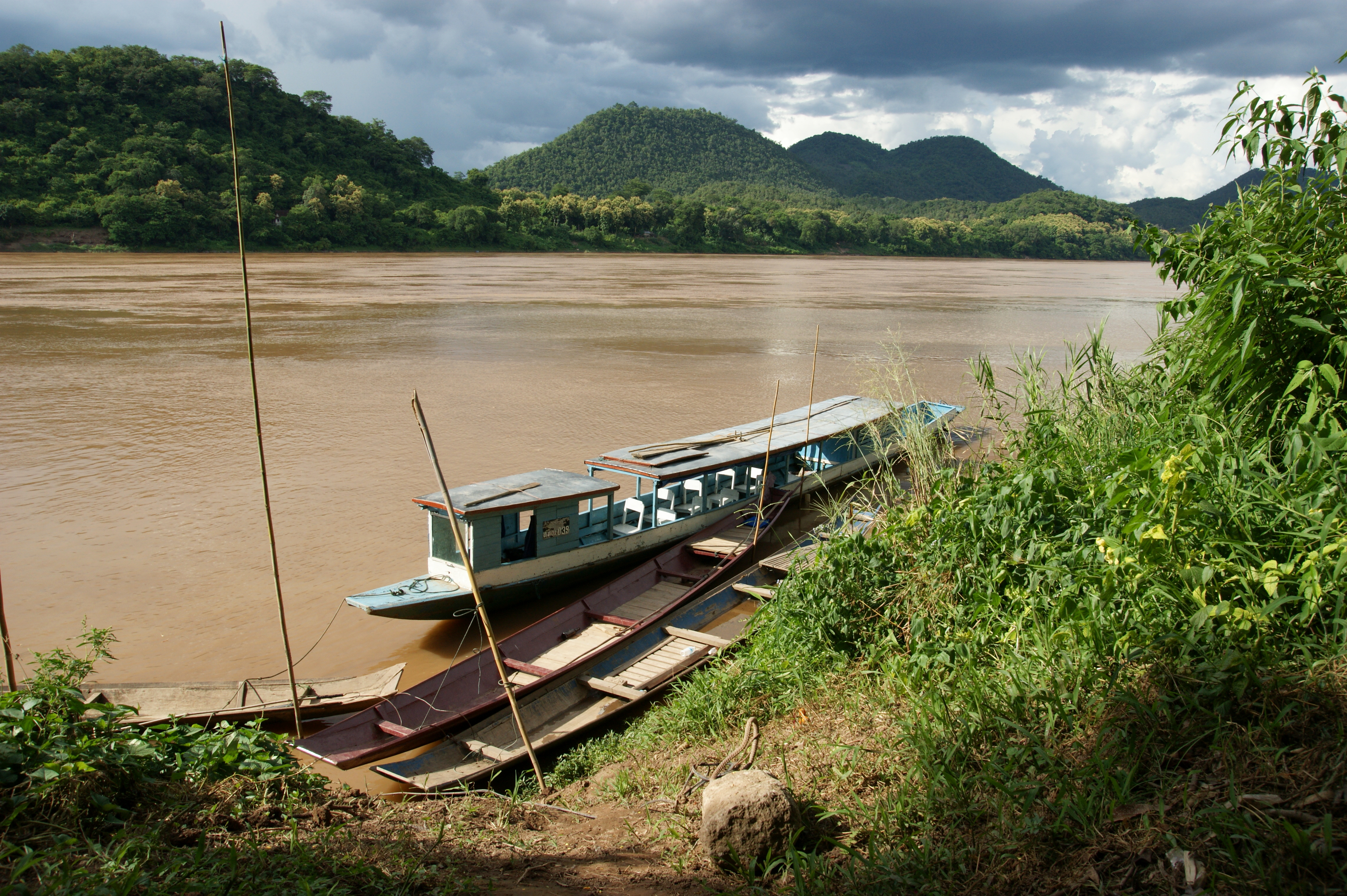
A Mekong River sampan boat, typically used by modern-day Asian river pirates

=== China ===
In Asia, river piracy is a major threat even today. The "Yangtze Patrol", from 1854 to 1949, was a prolonged naval operation, protecting American treaty ports and U.S. citizens along the Yangtze River from river pirates and Chinese insurgents. During the 1860s and 1870s, American merchant ships were prominent on the lower Yangtze, operating inland up to the deepwater port of Hankou 680 mi (1,090 km). In 1874, the U.S. gunboat USS Ashuelot reached as far as Ichang, at the foot of the Yangtze gorges, 975 miles (1,569 km) from the sea. In this period, most US personnel found a tour in the Yangtze to be uneventful, as a major American shipping company had sold its interests to a Chinese firm, leaving the patrol with little to protect. The added mission of anti-piracy patrols required U.S. naval and marine landing parties to be put ashore several times to protect American interests.

=== Southeast Asia along Mekong River ===
Currently, in a region known as the "Golden Triangle", river piracy, combined with illegal trafficking of heroin, poses a major international law enforcement problem. One of the worst criminal cases involving Asian river pirates occurred on 5 October 2011, called the "Mekong River massacre". A Chinese cargo ship hauling nine hundred thousand amphetamine pills, worth more than three million dollars, was attacked and hijacked, and thirteen crewmen were killed. The hijackers were caught and executed by the Chinese government in 2012.

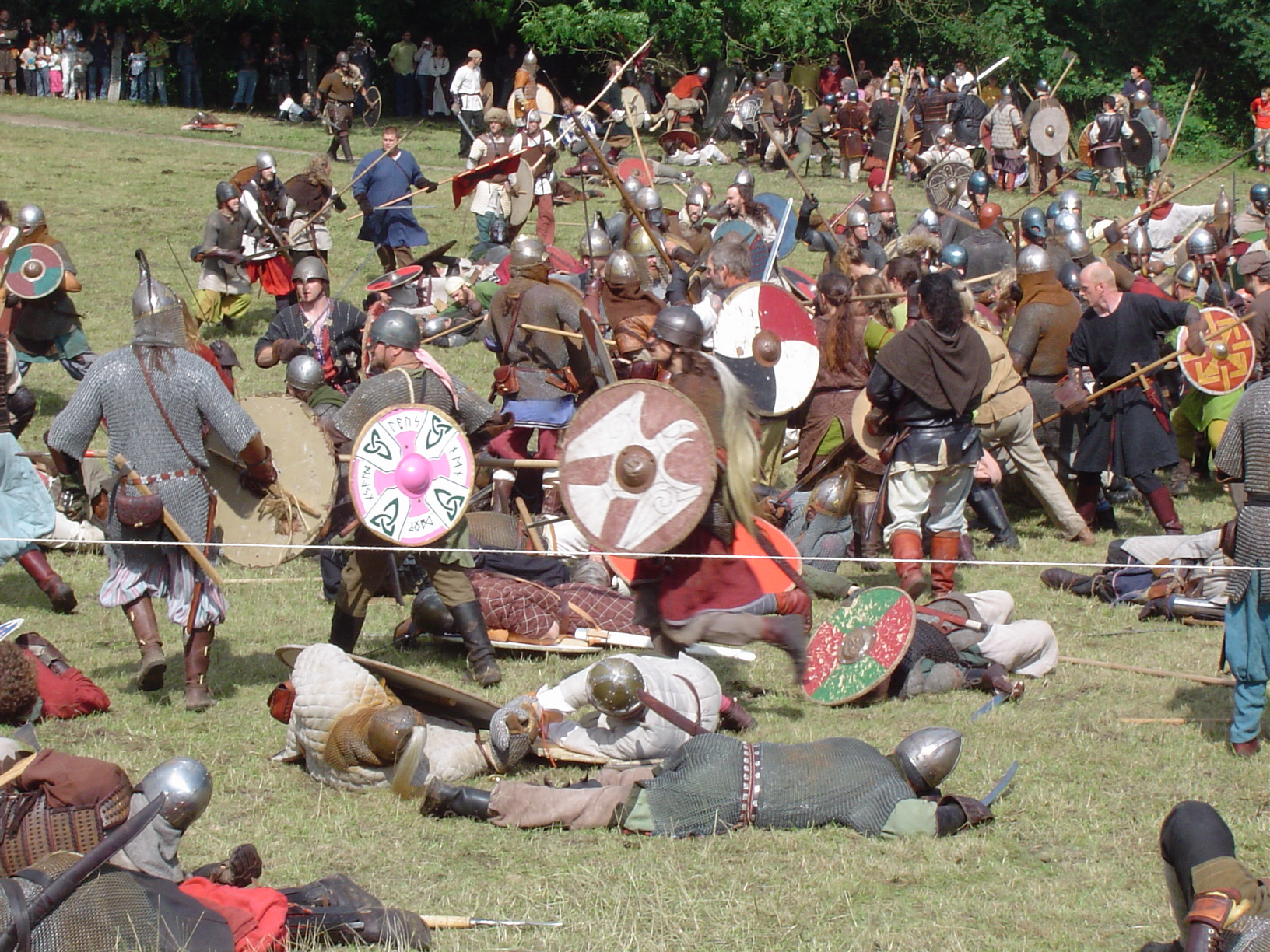
The Balkan Narentines, of the ninth and tenth centuries, were known for piracy on the River Neretva. The Ushkuiniks were Russian Novgorodian Volga river pirates from the tenth to the fourteenth centuries. Both medieval river pirate groups were Slavic versions of Viking river raiders.

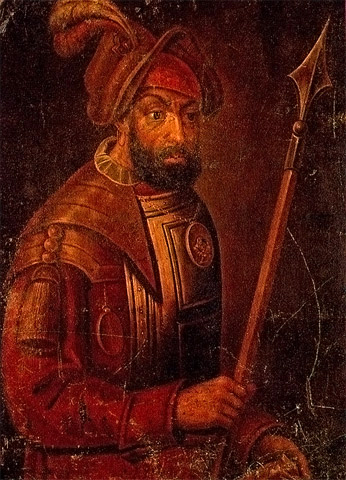
Yermak Timofeyevich was a 16th-century Cossack river pirate who started the Russian conquest of Siberia, in the reign of Tsar Ivan the Terrible.

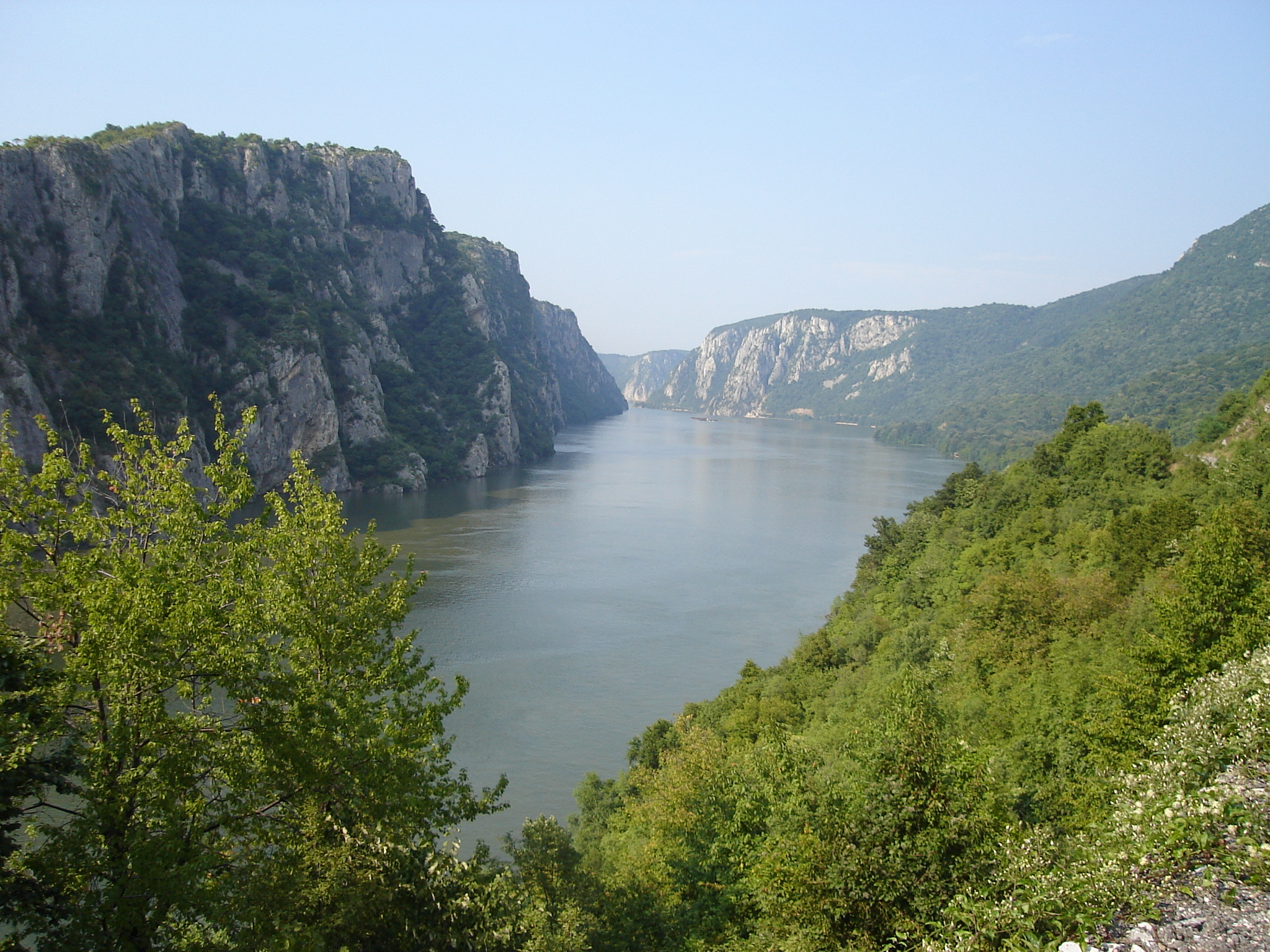
The Iron Gates, on the Danube River, are the natural boundary between Serbia and Romania, where modern-day river piracy exists.

== Europe ==
=== Balkans ===
In the Balkans region, of Bosnia and Herzegovina and Croatia, the medieval Narentines, of the ninth and tenth centuries, were known for their piracy on the River Neretva.

=== Russia ===
The Ushkuiniks were medieval Russian Novgorodian river pirates from the tenth to fourteenth centuries, a Slavic version of the Vikings, through fighting, killing, and robbery. In the sixteenth-century reign of Tsar Ivan the Terrible, the legendary explorer and soldier Yermak Timofeyevich, was a Russian Cossack river pirate along the Volga or possibly Don River. Yermak was later pardoned for his crimes and became the "Conqueror of Siberia".

=== Along Danube River ===
Modern piracy exists on the Danube River in Serbia and Romania. Allegations were made from 2006 that Romanian river pirates had attacked vessels from Bulgaria on the Danube. The Romanian government responded by accusing captains of fabricating stories while illegally selling their own cargo and evading customs. There were further allegations of Danubian piracy on Ukrainian vessels in 2012 but in only one case were there allegations of actual attacks on crews: more properly the incidents amounted simply to theft from cargo vessels.

== North America ==
=== United States ===
==== Ohio and Mississippi Rivers ====
American river piracy in late eighteenth and mid-nineteenth century was primarily concentrated along the Ohio River and Mississippi River valleys. River pirates usually operated in isolated frontier settlements, which were sparsely populated areas lacking the protection of civil authority and institutions. They resorted to a variety of tactics depending on the number of pirates and size of the boat crews involved, including deception, concealment, ambush, and assaults in open combat near natural obstacles and curiosities, such as shelter caves, islands, river narrows, rapids, swamps, and marshes. River travelers were robbed, captured, and murdered, and their livestock, slaves, cargo, and flatboats, keelboats, and rafts were sunk or sold down river.

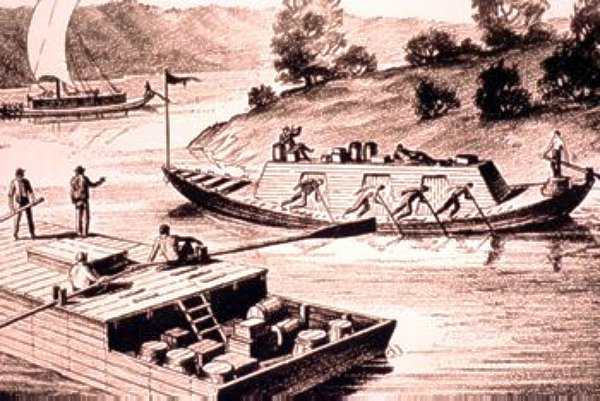
From the late eighteenth to early nineteenth centuries, American river pirates on the Ohio and Mississippi Rivers chose flatboats, keelboats, and rafts as profitable targets to attack because of the valuable and plentiful cargo on board.

Toward the end of the Revolutionary War, after their escape from New Madrid, Spanish Upper Louisiana Territory, John Turner and the counterfeiter Philip Alston joined Chickasaw Indian leader, James Logan Colbert and a mixed, roving band of Natchez refugees, Cumberland settlers, and Chickasaw, numbering around 600, made piratical attacks against Spanish shipping on the Mississippi River in 1781 and 1782.

After the Revolutionary War, American river piracy began to take root in the mid-1780s along the upper Mississippi River, between Spanish Upper Louisiana, around St. Louis and the confluence with the Ohio River at Cairo. In 1803, at Tower Rock, the U.S. Army dragoons, possibly from the frontier army post up river at Fort Kaskaskia, opposite St. Louis, raided and drove out the river pirates.

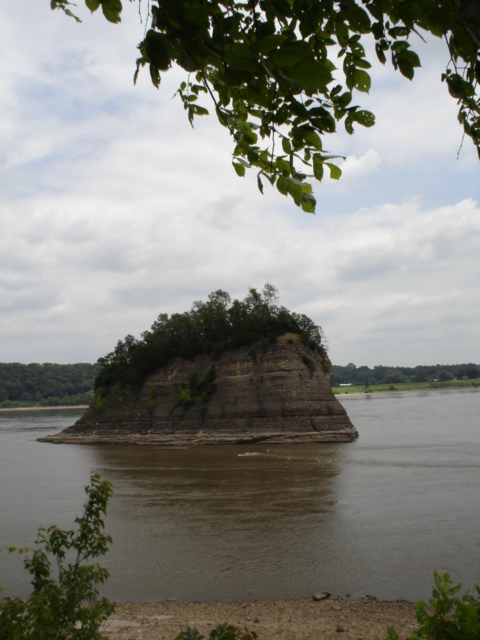
In 1803, at Tower Rock, the U.S. Army dragoons raided and drove out the river pirates.

Starting in the late 1790s, Stack Island became associated with river pirates and counterfeiters. In 1809, the last major river pirate activity on the upper Mississippi came to an abrupt end, when a group of flatboatmen, meeting at the head of the "Nine Mile Reach," decided to make a raid on Stack Island and wipe out the river pirates. They attacked at night, a battle ensued, and two of the boatmen and several outlaws were killed. The attackers captured nineteen other men, a fifteen-year-old boy and two women. The women and teenager were allowed to leave. The remaining outlaws are presumed to have been executed.

From 1790 to 1834, Cave-In-Rock was the principal outlaw lair and headquarters of river pirate activity in the Ohio River region. The notorious cave is today within the peaceful confines of Illinois's Cave-in-Rock State Park. In 1797, it was anything but peaceful, as Samuel Mason, who was initially a Revolutionary War Patriot captain in the Ohio County, Virginia militia and an associate judge and squire in Kentucky, led a gang of highway robbers and river pirates on the Ohio. Mason started his criminal organization in Red Banks and was driven out by regulators sweeping through western Kentucky, so set up his new operation at Diamond Island, followed by Cave-In-Rock and later, along the Mississippi River, from Stack Island to Natchez, Mississippi.

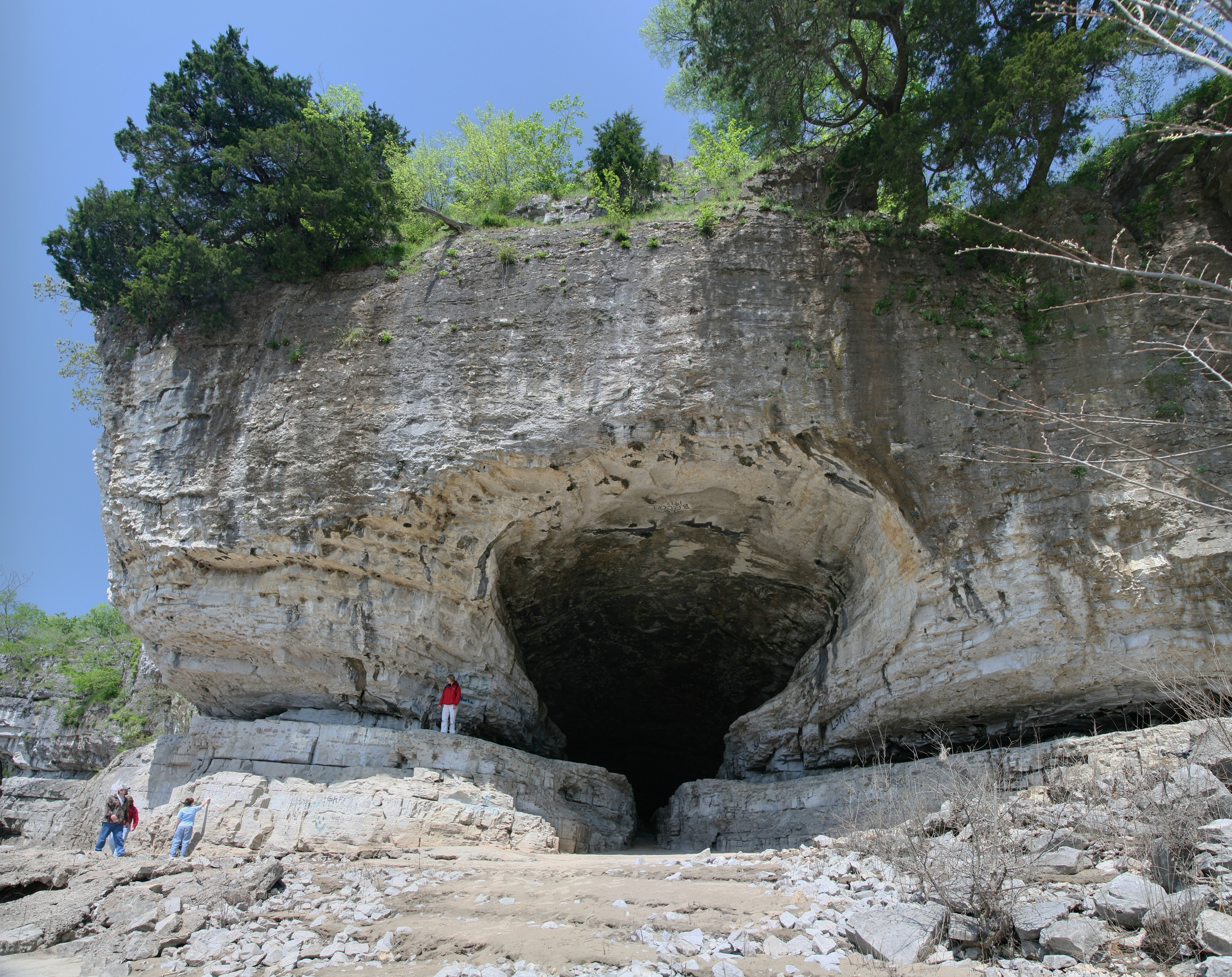
Cave-In-Rock was the lair, of American river pirates, along the Ohio River, from 1790 to 1834.

During Samuel Mason's 1797–1799 occupation of Cave-In-Rock and after his departure, the name of Bully Wilson became associated with cave; a large sign was erected near the natural landmark's entrance, "Liquor Vault and House for Entertainment." Wilson may have been an alias for Mason, a front man for his criminal operation, or another outlaw leader who ran a gang of pirates in the region. The Harpe Brothers, who were allegedly America's first serial killers, were highwaymen on the run from the law in Tennessee and Kentucky, and briefly joined Samuel Mason's gang at Cave-In-Rock. Peter Alston, the son of counterfeiter Philip Alston, became a river pirate and highwayman at Cave-In-Rock and made the acquaintance of Samuel Mason and Wiley Harpe, following them to Stack Island and Natchez.

From the late 1700s to early 1800s, on the Illinois side of the Ohio River north of Cave-In-Rock, Jonathan Brown led a small gang of river pirates at Battery Rock. The lower Ohio River country was routinely patrolled by the U.S. Army, with troops garrisoned at Fort Massac as constabulary against Native Americans, colonial raiders from Spanish Louisiana, and river outlaws in the region.

Between 1790 and 1820, the legendary Colonel Plug, also known as Colonel Fluger, ran a gang of river pirates on the Ohio River, in a cypress swamp near the mouth of the Cache River, below Cave-In-Rock and Fort Massac and just above the confluence of the Ohio and Mississippi Rivers. Plug's tactics were to sneak aboard personally, or have one of his pirates secretly go into the hull of a boat, and dig out the caulking between the floor planks or drill holes with an auger, causing the boat to sink and be easily attacked. The boat and the cargo would later be sold down river.

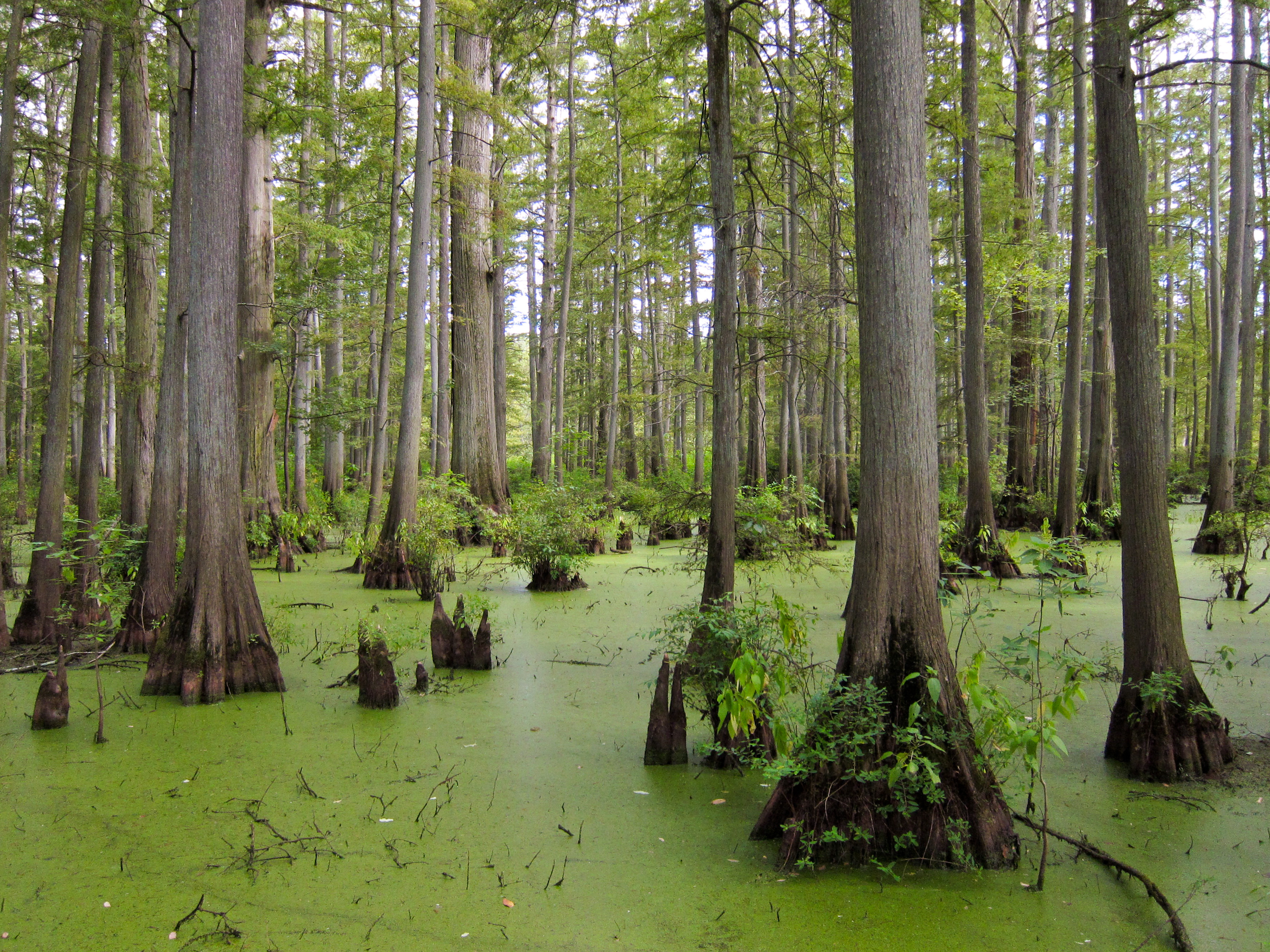
American river pirates patrolled the Cache River cypress swamp of Southern Illinois, near the confluence of the Ohio and Mississippi Rivers, from the 1790s–1820.

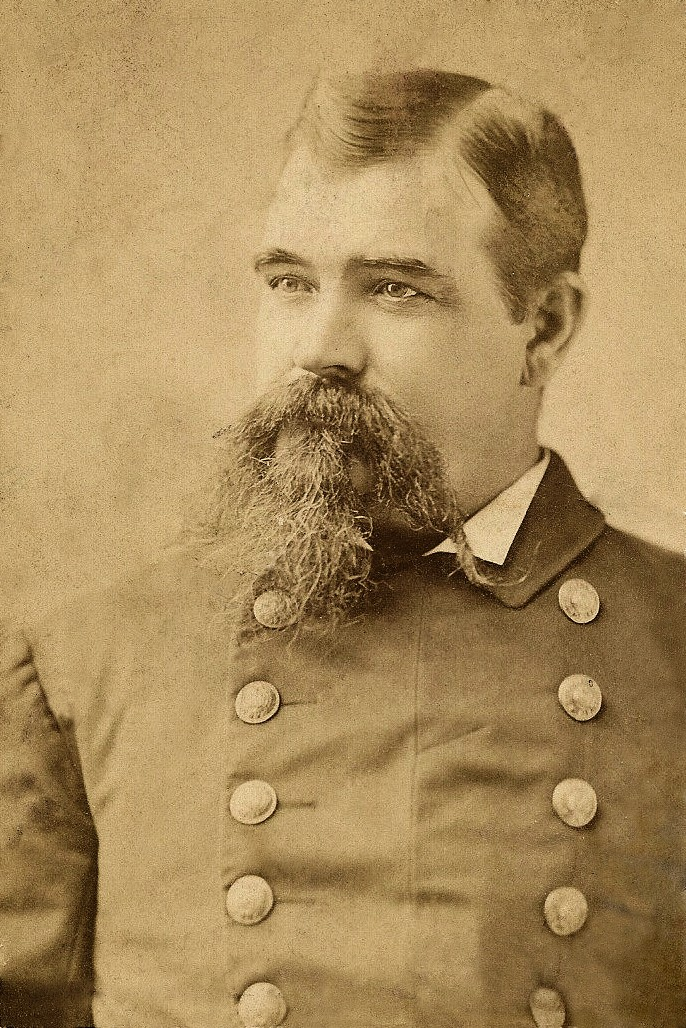
New York City Police Sergeant George W. Gastlin organized the "Steamboat Squad" in 1876 to end river piracy in New York Harbor by 1877.

James Ford, a civic leader and businessman, secretly led a gang of river pirates and highwaymen from the 1820s to the mid-1830s on the Ohio River, in Illinois and Kentucky.

River piracy continued on the lower Mississippi River from the early 1800s to the 1840s. These river pirates were mainly organized into large gangs similar to Samuel Mason's around Cave-In-Rock, or smaller gangs under the operation of John A. Murrell, which also existed from the 1820s to the mid-1830s between Stack Island and Natchez, Mississippi.

The decline of American river piracy occurred over time, starting as early as 1804 and ending by the 1840s, as a result of direct military action taken and the combined strength of local law enforcement and regulator-vigilante groups that uprooted and swept out pockets of outlaw resistance.

==== New York City ====
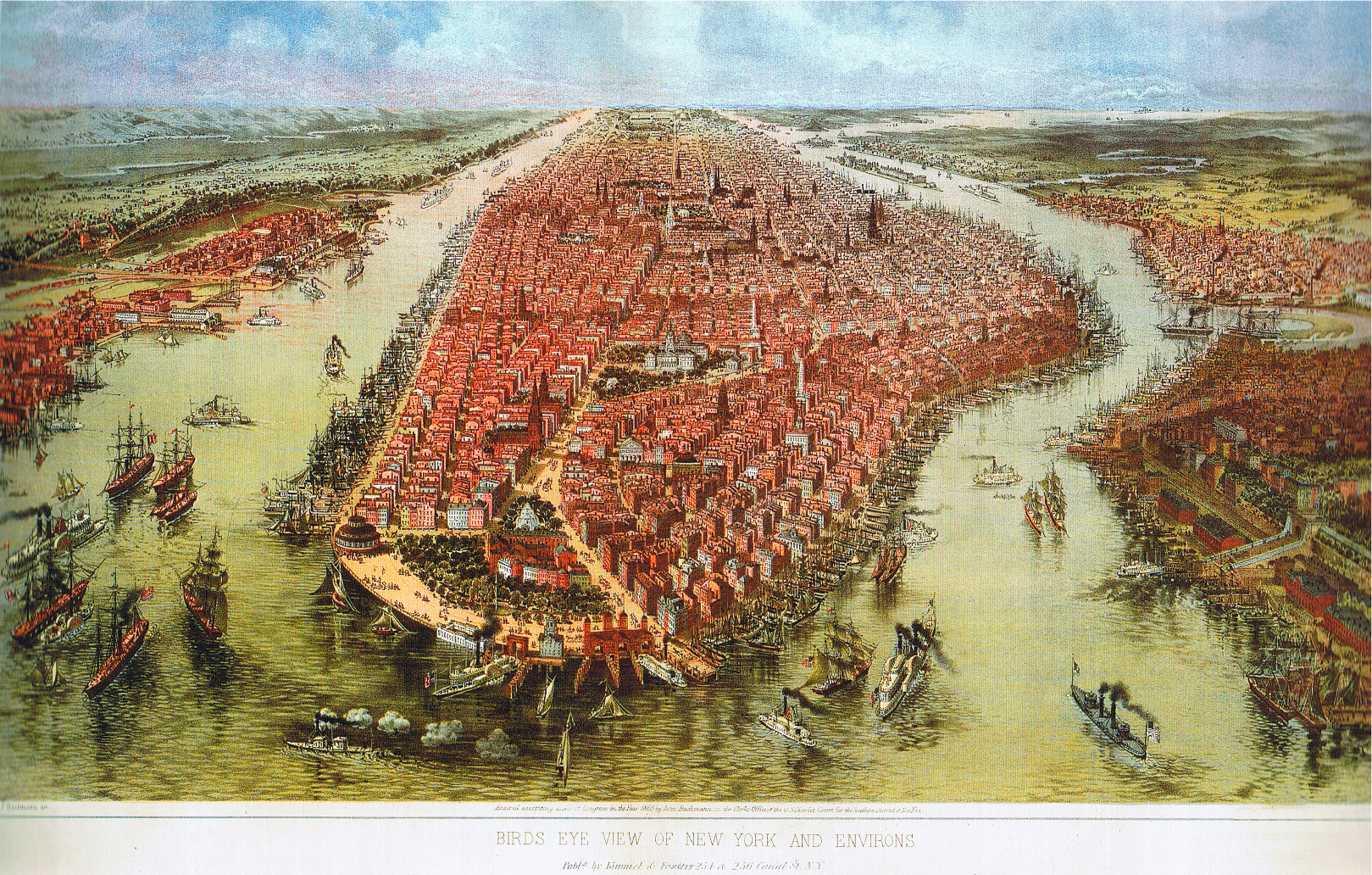
The New York City waterfront where river pirates harassed shipping from 1866 to 1877.

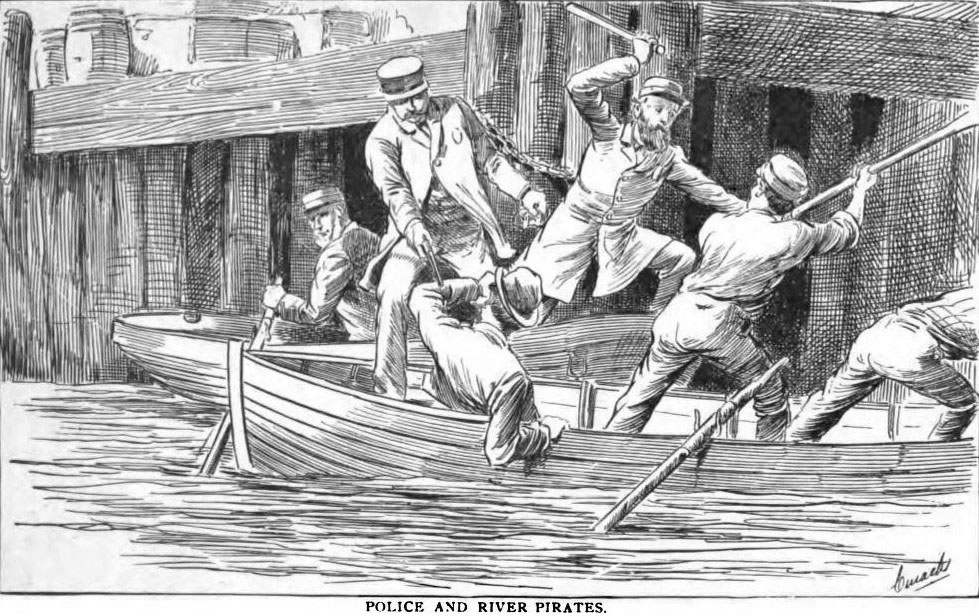
New York City Police fighting river pirates along the 19th century New York City waterfront

From 1866 to 1877, the New York City waterfront was infested with gangs of river pirates along the Hudson and East Rivers. River piracy consisted mainly of pirates stealing goods and cargo from ships in open water and docked along the waterfront piers. Many of the river pirates that formed to these gangs were well organized and consisted mainly of working class Irish Americans and Irish immigrants. The most notorious New York river pirate gangs were the Charlton Street Gang, Hook Gang, and Patsey Conroy Gang.

In the mid-1860s the Charlton Street Gang was led by the female pirate Sadie "the Goat" Farrell. Sadie the Goat modeled herself and her gang after the "pirates of the Golden Age" by flying the "Jolly Roger" flag aboard their ship and making victims walk the plank.

The Charlton Street Gang raided small cargo and merchant ships and operated within the territory of New York City, North River, of New York Harbor, Hudson River, from the Harlem River, as far as Poughkeepsie and Albany, New York.

After the Charlton Street Gang murdered people in pirate raids in the Hudson River Valley, the Charlton Street Gang was attacked and dispersed by local vigilantes in the region. Following this setback the Charlton Street Gang decided to return to New York City and commit only street crimes never to return to river piracy again. By 1869, the gang disappeared from the scene.

The eventual decline of river piracy in New York City began in 1876 when the New York City Police Department under the command of Police Sergeant George W. Gastlin organized the "Steamboat Squad" in which armed police patrols in boats confronted and arrested the river pirates in New York harbor.

=== United States – Mexico border ===
==== Rio Grande ====
An increase in crime at the border between the United States and Mexico on Falcon Lake. The lake is a 60-mile (97 km) long reservoir of the Rio Grande that was constructed in 1954 and is known for river piracy and as a drug smuggling route of the Mexican cartels in the ongoing conflict known as the Mexican drug war.

== South America ==
In recent years, river pirate activity on the Amazon River has been on the rise in various countries around that river.

In northern Brazil, due to the lack of investments in security, river pirate activity skyrocketed. Attacks against oil tankers, cargo boats and fishermen became very frequent in this region.

In Colombia, paramilitary groups and drug cartels committed numerous hijackings, and looting of boats and kidnapping are also frequent.

== See also ==
- List of pirates
