= 4th Ward, New York =

Ward of New York City

Coordinates: 40.711388°N 74.000081°W

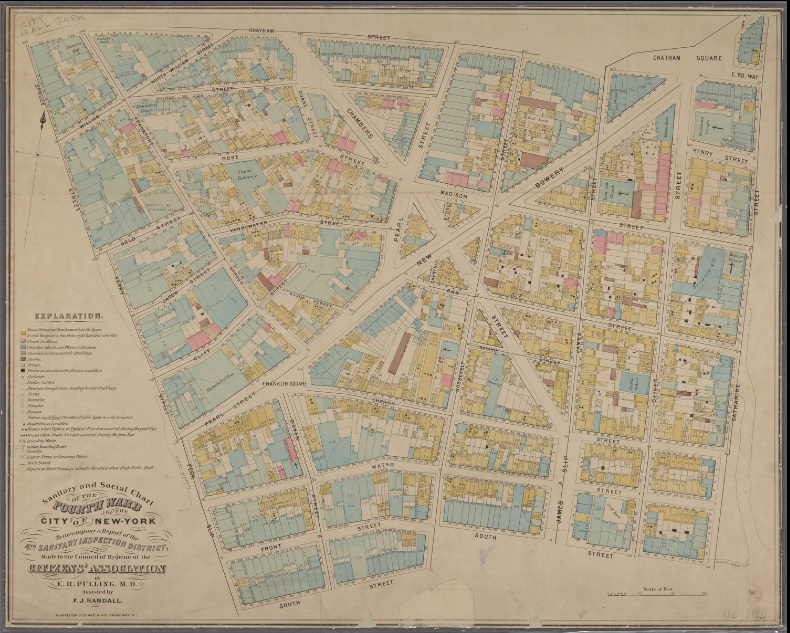
The 4th Ward

The 4th Ward was one of the 22 wards of New York City with representation in the Board of Aldermen. It was made up of seven election districts and was bounded by Spruce Street, Ferry Street, Peck Slip, South Street, Catharine Street, and Chatham Street (now Park Row).

== List of Aldermen ==
- 1797 - Anthony Post (builder)
- 1798-1802 - John Bogert (merchant)
- 1810-1813 - Richard Cunningham (tanner)
- 1813-1816 - Peter McCartie
- 1818 - William F. Van Ambridge
- 1819-1827 - John P. Anthony (tanner)
- 1824 - Samuel Cowdrey (lawyer)
- 1825 - John Agnew (tobacconist)
- 1831 - Hubert Van Wagenen (hardware store owner)
- 1833 - Charles G. Ferris (lawyer)
- 1834 - Hubert Van Wagenen (hardware store owner)
- 1840 - Daniel C. Pentz (cooper)
- 1842-1843 - Robert Martin (cordial distiller)
- 1846-1847 - George H. Purser
- 1848 - Edmund Fitzgerald
- 1850-1854 - Jacob F. Oakley (liquors)
- 1854-1855 - William Baird
- 1856-1858 - Bartholomew Healy (shoe store owner)

== List of Assistant Aldermen ==
- 1792-1796 - Anthony Post (builder)
- 1797 - John Bogert (merchant)
- 1798 - George Lindsey (stonecutter)
- 1802 - Leroy Jacob
- 1802-1803 - Robert Bogardus (lawyer)
- 1804 - Ab. Bloodgood (currier)
- 1805 - Adrian Hegeman (lawyer)
- 1806 - Robert Bogardus (lawyer)
- 1807 - Ab. Bloodgood (currier)
- 1808 - Adrian Hegeman (lawyer)
- 1809 - Robert Bogardus (lawyer)
- 1810 - Peter H. Wendover (sailmaker)
- 1810-1815 - Elisha W. King (lawyer)
- 1817 - William F. Van Ambridge
- 1818 - John P. Anthony (tanner)
- 1819-1822 - Benjamin Crane (stationer)
- 1822 - Samuel Cowdrey (lawyer)
- 1824 - John Agnew (tobacconist)
- 1825 - John Hitchcock
- 1832 - Charles G. Ferris (lawyer)
- 1835 - Benjamin Townsend (grocer)
- 1839 - Jesse West (merchant)
- 1840 - Benton W. Halsey (physician)
- 1841 - Alfred Ashfield (coal dealer)
- 1845 - George H. Purser
- 1848 - Nathan A. Sutton (merchant)
- 1849 - Jacob F. Oakley (liquors)
- 1850-1851 - Florence McCarthy (lawyer)
- 1852-1853 - Timothy O'Brien (builder)

== Other sources ==
- Willis, Samuel J. and Valentine, David Thomas. 1869. Manual of the Corporation of the City of New York, New York, N.Y.: E. Jones & Co.
