= George Gastlin =

American law enforcement officer and police captain

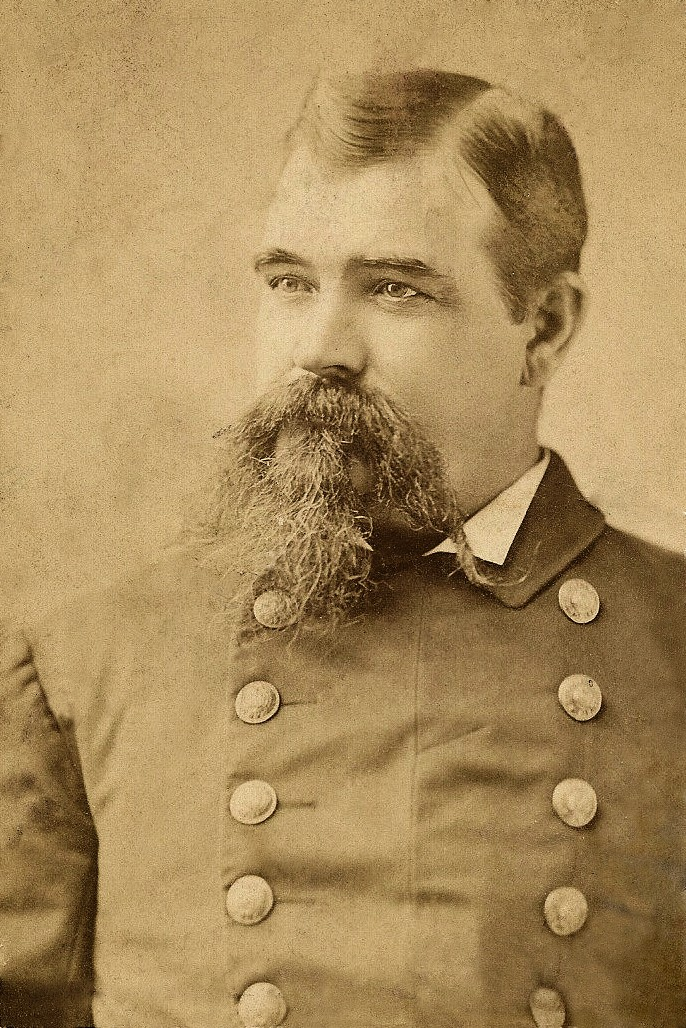
- Born: George Washington Gastlin; October 1, 1835
- Died: October 2, 1895 (aged 60); Manhattan, New York,
- Occupations: Police officer and private detective
- Known for: NYPD police captain who headed the "Steamboat Squad" during the 1870s and 1880s.
- Children: 2 children

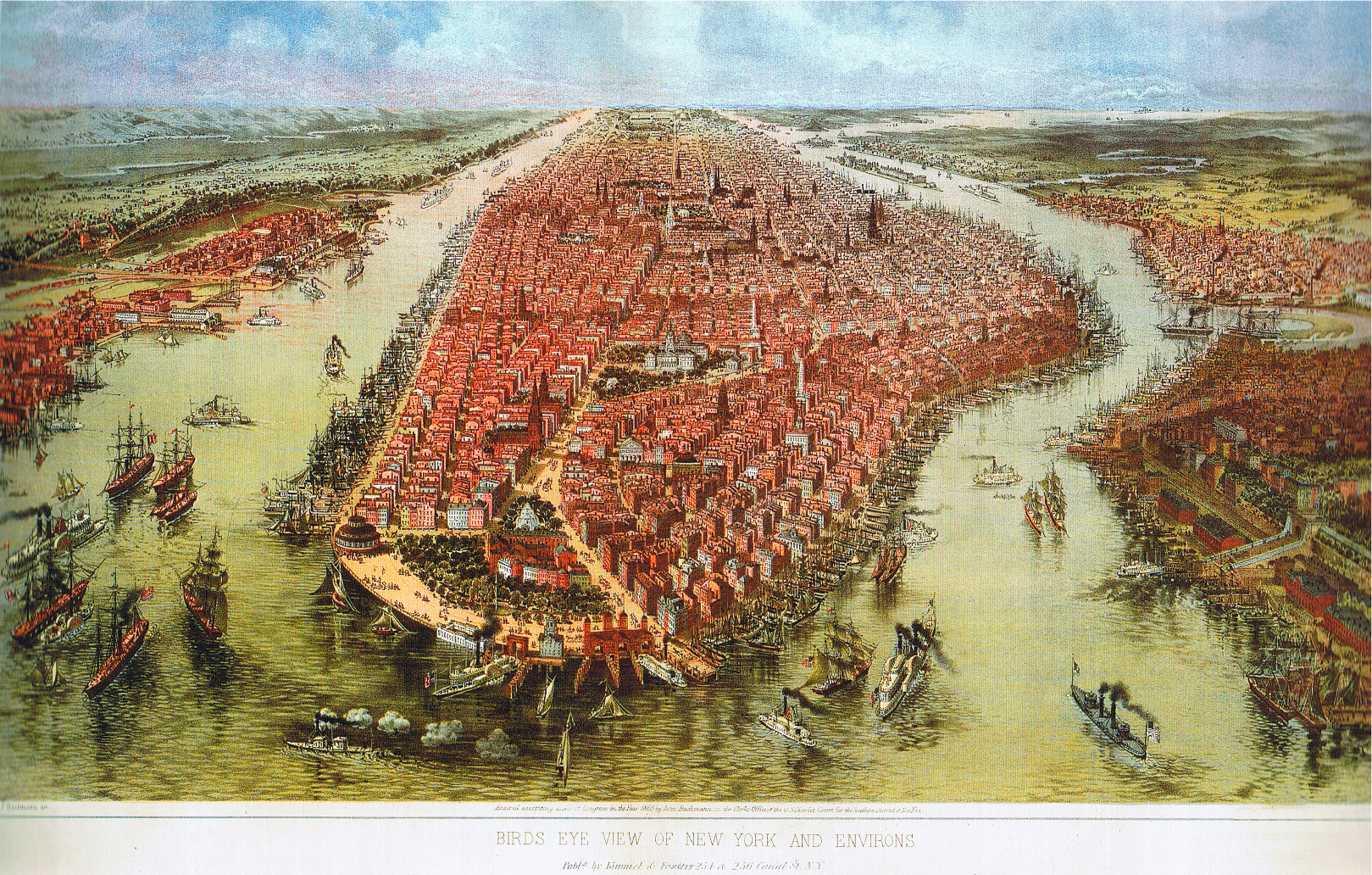
The New York City waterfront where gangs of river pirates harassed shipping from 1866 to 1876.

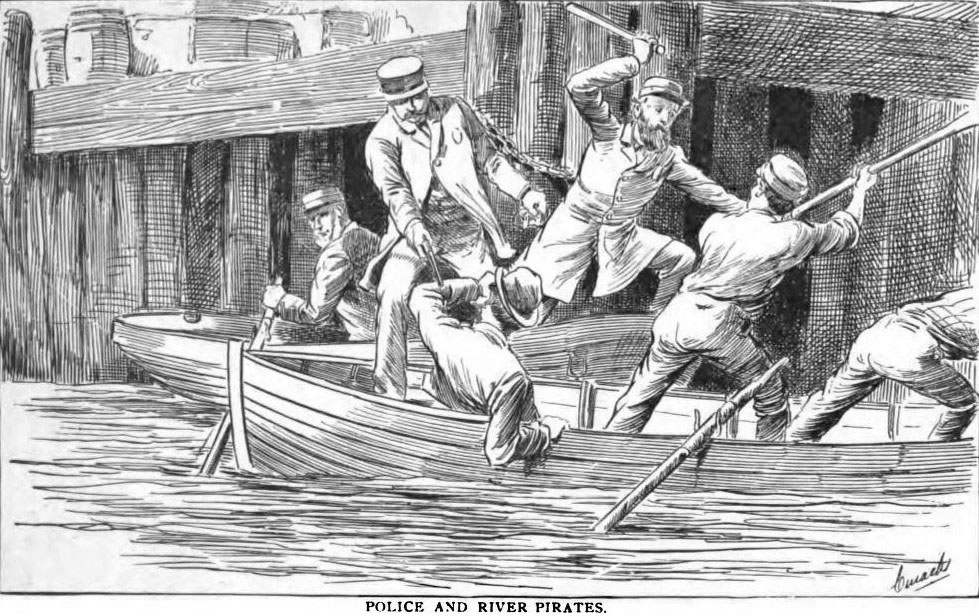
New York City Police possibly George Gastlin's "Steamboat Squad" fighting river pirates along the 19th century New York waterfront

George Washington Gastlin (October 1, 1835 – October 2, 1895) was an American law enforcement officer and police captain, with the New York City Police Department, who founded the "Steamboat Squad" and served as its commander, during the 1870s and 80s.

== Early life ==
Gastlin joined the 82nd New York Infantry Regiment as a corporal on May 21, 1861. He was promoted to sergeant before being discharged for disability on May 20, 1862.

== Police career ==
He joined the NYPD on May 19, 1864, less than a year after the New York Draft Riots, and gradually rose up the ranks over the next few years being promoted to roundsman on February 15, 1868, and then sergeant on July 6, 1870. On June 9, 1876, Gastlin was appointed as head of the "Steamboat Squad", a special police unit formed to combat River pirates and street gangs active on the New York waterfront, and was finally made a captain on September 20, 1878.

On December 31, 1883, a meeting was held at the Astor House in honor of Gastlin and his work with the "Steamboat Squad". Organized by a 4-man committee under James Robbins (Stonington Line), J.S. Boden (Pennsylvania Railroad), C.H. Tucker (West Shore and Buffalo Railroad) and John S. Krems (Baltimore Transportation Company), at least 40 representatives from steamboat and railroad companies were in attendance including R.J. Cortes (White Star Line), W.H. Stamford (Old Dominion Line), E.A. Dereau (Stonington Line), John T. Robb (Pennsylvania Railroad), Andrew M. Underhill (Guion Line), James A. Smith (Citizens' Steamboat Company) and H.L. Freeland (Fall River Line). After giving a testimonial of the police captain's career, Andrew Underhill presented Gastlin with a custom-made gold shield on behalf of the committee along with a letter of thanks, placed in an elaborate gold frame, from all the companies involved.

Under his leadership, the "Steamboat Squad" drove out most of the criminal element from Corlears' Hook by the time of his retirement on July 1, 1890. He worked as a private detective for the next several years until poor health forced him to stop.

== Death ==
Gastlin died from Bright's disease at his Seventh Avenue home on the morning of October 2, 1895, after a two-week illness.
