= Waterfront (area) =

Dockland district, or area alongside a body of water

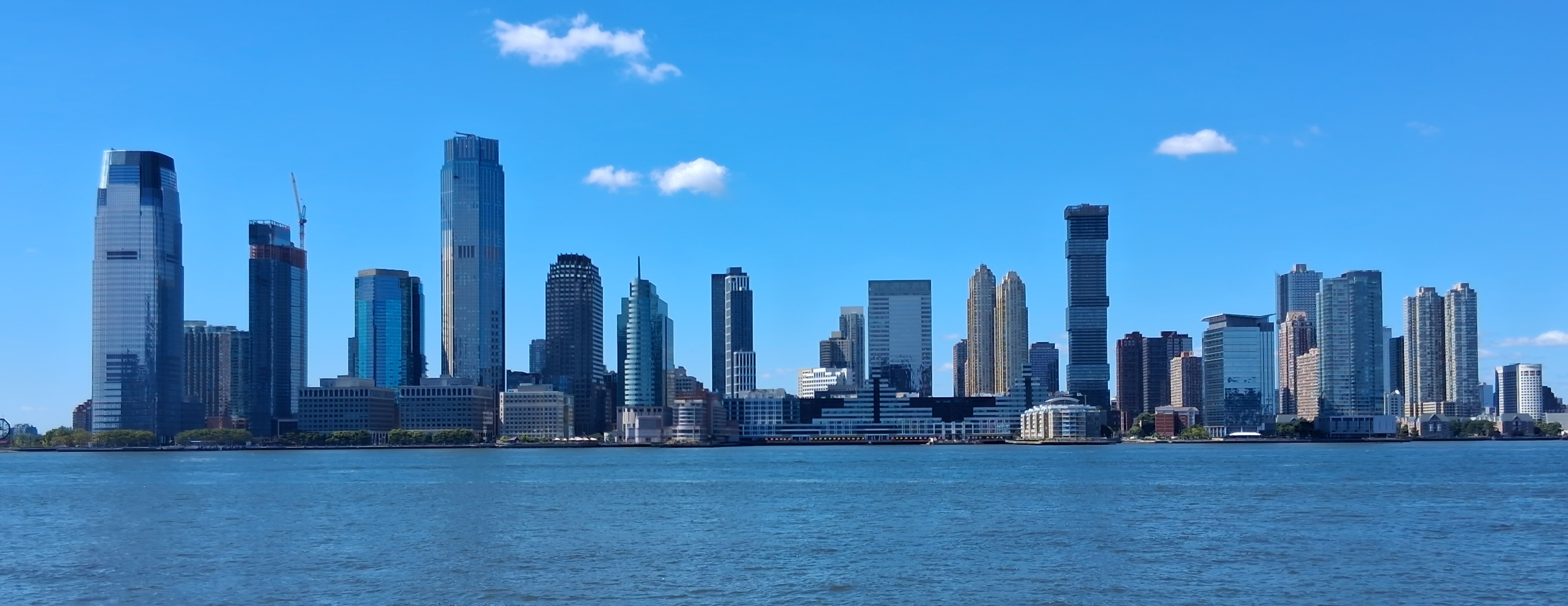
Jersey City, New Jersey waterfront, U.S.

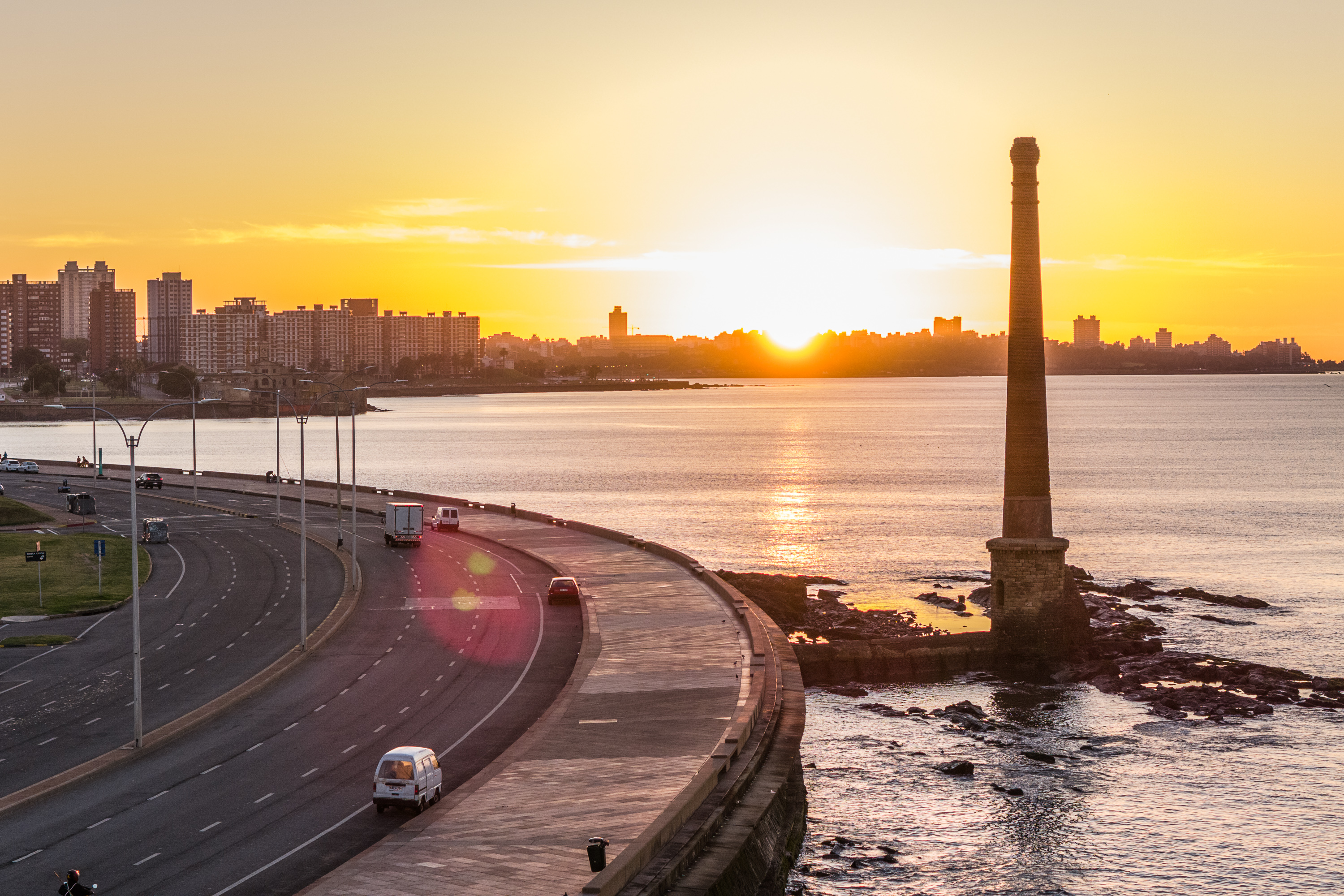
The Rambla of Montevideo, Uruguay.

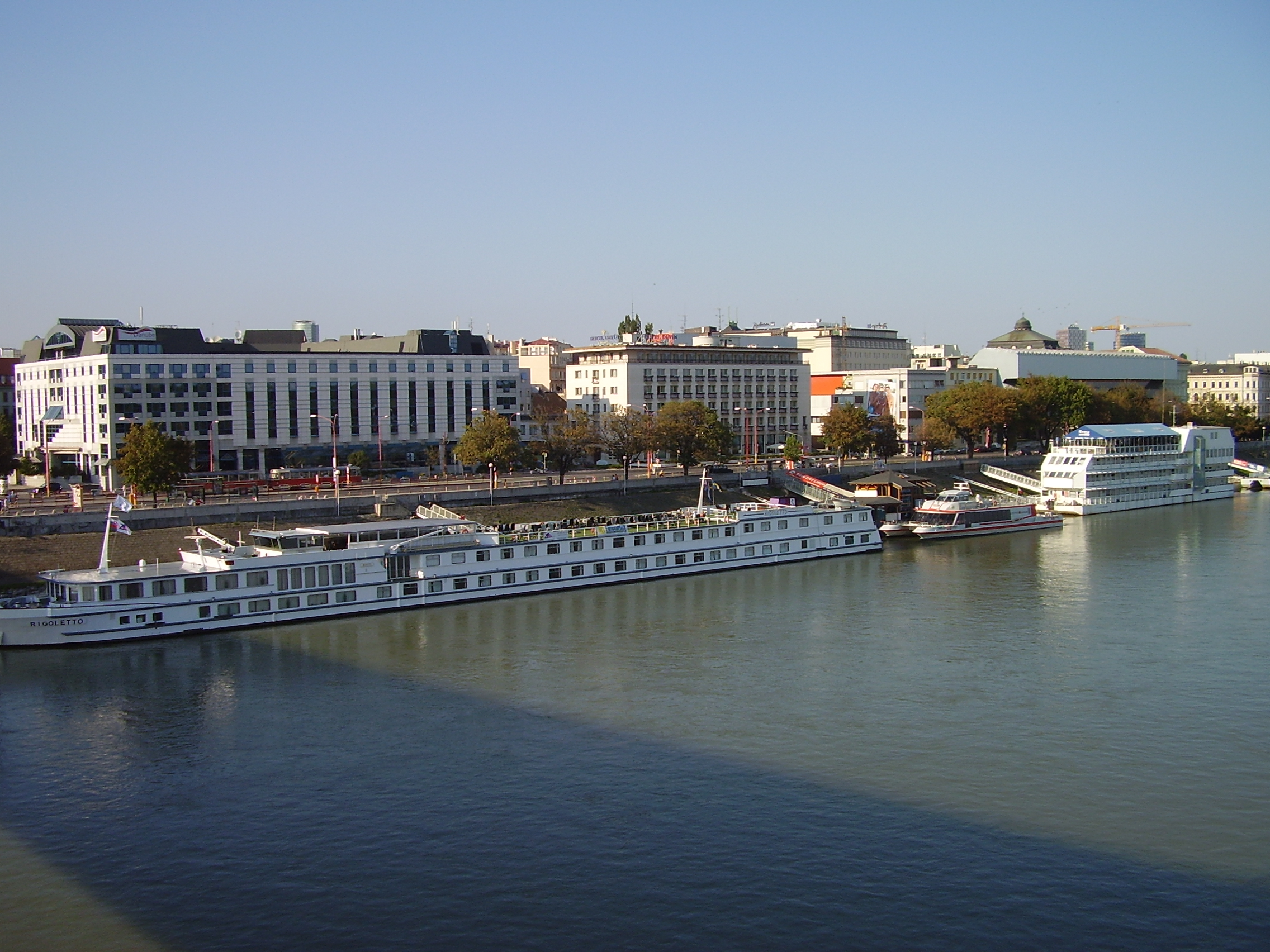
Waterfront of Bratislava, Slovakia in July 2007.

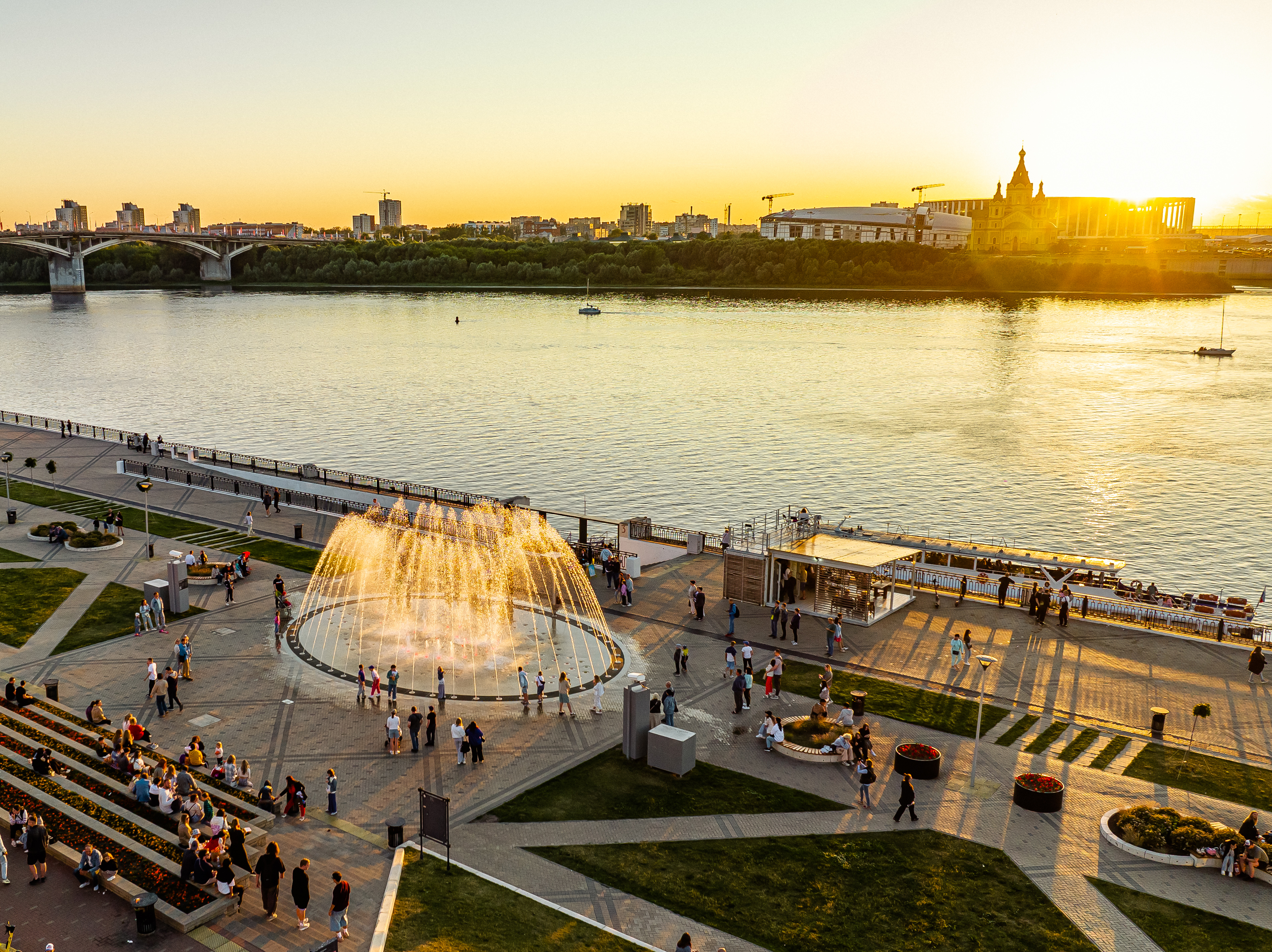
Waterfront in Nizhny Novgorod, Russia

The waterfront area of a city or town is its dockland district, or the area alongside a body of water.

== List of examples ==
=== Africa ===
- Alexandria Corniche, Alexandria, Egypt
- V&A Waterfront, Cape Town, South Africa

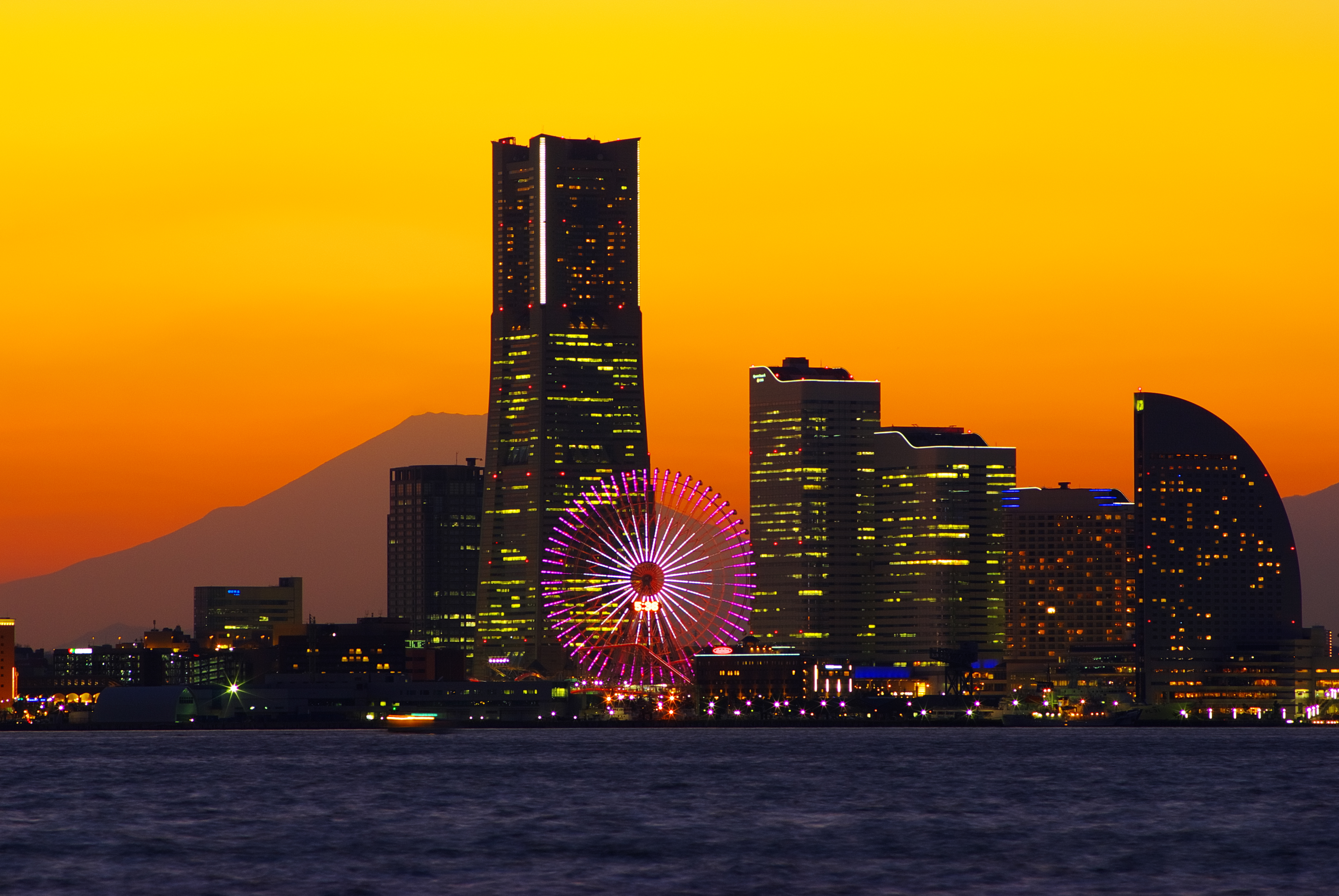
Minato Mirai 21 in Yokohama, Japan

=== Americas ===
- Baltimore Inner Harbor, Baltimore, USA
- Chicago Riverwalk, Chicago, USA
- Detroit International Riverfront, Detroit, USA
- Embarcadero (San Francisco), San Francisco, USA
- Embarcadero (San Diego), San Diego, USA
- Jersey City, USA
- Manhattan, USA
- Navy Pier, Chicago, USA
- Rambla, Montevideo, Uruguay
- Puerto Madero, Buenos Aires, Argentina
- Toronto waterfront, Toronto, Canada

=== Asia ===
- Central Harbourfront, Hong Kong
- The Bund, Shanghai, China
- Dubai Waterfront, Dubai, UAE
- Jeddah Waterfront, Jeddah, Saudi Arabia
- Doha Corniche, Doha, Qatar
- Varanasi Ghats, Varanasi, India
- Kamarajar Promenade, Chennai, India
- Marine Drive, Kochi, India
- Promenade beach, Pondicherry, India
- Valankulam Lakefront, Coimbatore, India
- Elliot Beach (Besant Nagar Beach), Chennai, India
- Sabarmati Riverfront, Ahmedabad, India
- Minato Mirai 21, Yokohama, Japan
- Mira Coral Bay, Dubai, UAE
- Odaiba, Tokyo, Japan
- Marina bay, Singapore
- Malacca River, Malacca, Malaysia
- Passo, Dubai, UAE
- Victoria Dockside, Hong Kong

=== Europe ===
- Belgrade Waterfront, Belgrade, Serbia
- Bratislava Riverfront, Bratislava, Slovakia
- Camden Waterfront, Camden, USA
- Dublin Docklands, Dublin, Ireland
- HafenCity, Hamburg, Germany
- Ipswich Waterfront, Suffolk, England
- London Docklands, London, England
- Port Vell, Barcelona, Spain
- Monte Carlo, Monaco
- Rheinauhafen, Cologne, Germany
- Nea Paralia, Thessaloniki, Greece
- Ribeira District, Porto, Portugal
- Ruoholahti, Helsinki, Finland
- Valletta Waterfront, Floriana, Malta

=== Oceania ===
- Auckland waterfront, Auckland, New Zealand
- Barangaroo Waterfront, Sydney, Australia
- Circular Quay, Sydney, Australia
- Docklands, Melbourne, Australia
- Elizabeth Quay, Perth, Australia
- Geelong Waterfront, Geelong, Australia
- South Bank Parklands, Brisbane, Australia

== See also ==
- Corniche
- Esplanade
