= List of highwaymen =

This is a chronological list of highwaymen, land pirates, mail coach robbers, road agents, stagecoach robbers, and bushrangers active, along trails, roads, and highways, in Europe, North America, South America, Australia, Asia, and Africa, from ancient times to the 20th century, arranged by continent and country.

== List ==
=== Europe ===
Name	Life	Years active	Country of origin	Comments
Jerry Abershawe	1773–1795		United Kingdom	Last executed highwayman to have his body put on public display in England.
James Aitken	1752–1777		United Kingdom	A mercenary who committed acts of sabotage in Royal Navy naval dockyards during the American Revolutionary War in 1776–77.
John Austin	d. 1783		United Kingdom	Last person to be publicly hanged from the gallows at Tyburn Tree, London.
Bauptista Landa Tretatxu	1716–1761		Basque Country	A bandit whose story has passed into Basque oral literature. He died in Valladolid, in prison, in unknown circumstances.
Joseph "Blueskin" Blake	1700–1724		United Kingdom	Former associate of Jack Sheppard and Jonathan Wild.
Willy Brennan	d. 1804		Ireland	
Mary Bryant	1765–?		United Kingdom	
Gaspard Bouis	1757–1781		France	Renowned in Provence for his donations to the poor.
Isaac Darkin	1740–1761		United Kingdom	
George Davenport	1758–1797		United Kingdom	"The Leicester Highwayman".
William Davies	1627–1689		United Kingdom	Robbed the rich for 40 years, otherwise known as the "Golden Farmer."
Tom, Dick and Harry Dunsdon	d. 1784		United Kingdom	
Claude Duval	1643–1670		United Kingdom	He was known as 'The Gallant Highwayman'.
Richard Ferguson	d. 1800		United Kingdom	An associate of Jerry Abershawe, known as "Galloping Dick".
Lady Katherine Ferrers	1634–1660		United Kingdom	She was believed to be the "Wicked Lady".
Captain Gallagher	d. 1818		Ireland	
Louis Dominique Garthausen	1693–1721		France	He was known as "Cartouche" or "Bourguignon" executed on the breaking wheel in Paris.
William Fletcher	c.1691-1729		United Kingdom	Aka. 'Black-Hearted Bill', because of his vicious, bloodthirsty nature, he robbed and murdered two travelers near to Nottingham in 1729. Pursued by local militia, he met his end in the caves under Ye Olde Salutation Inn in Nottingham, where his ghost is said to still haunt. Buried in unconsecrated ground with no marker or gravestone.
Rufus Goodlove	1688–1731		United Kingdom	He robbed the houses of rich Oxford merchants while they were away in London, reputedly by seducing their wives. Hanged in Banbury after being arrested in Cropredy.
James Hind	1616–1652		United Kingdom	
Captain Will Hollyday	d. 1697		United Kingdom	Captain of the Ragged Regiment of the Black Guards; hung the young Viscount Stafford
Juraj Jánošík	1688–1713		Slovakia	Betyár who became legendary in Slovak, Polish, and Czech cultures.
Humphrey Kynaston	d. 1534		United Kingdom	
George Lyon	1761–1815		United Kingdom	the last known highwayman to be hanged in Lancashire, England.
James MacLaine	1724–1750		United Kingdom	
Louis Mandrin	1725–1755		France	
John Nevison	1639–1684		United Kingdom	known as "Swift Nick"
Neesy O'Haughan	1691–1720		Ireland	
Nicolas Jacques Pelletier	1756–1792		France	He was the first person executed by guillotine during the French Revolution.
William Plunkett	d. 1750		United Kingdom	
John Rann	1750–1774		United Kingdom	
Sándor Rózsa	1813–1878		Hungary	
Jóska Savanyú			Hungary	
Jack Shrimpton	1671-1713		United Kingdom	Once a soldier in the 4th Regiment of Horse commanded by Major-General Cornelius Wood, an officer in John Churchill's army; Shrimpton was hanged at Gallows Acre, at the top of St. Michael's Hill in Bristol on 4 September 1713.
Ferdinando Shrimpton	1700-1730		United Kingdom	Son of Jack Shrimpton, and like his father he was also a soldier, Shrimpton was an associate of Robert Drummond, the Sunderland Highwayman; Shrimpton was hanged at Tyburn in Middlesex on 17 February 1730.
Robert Snooks	1761–1802		United Kingdom	The last man to be executed in England for highway robbery.
Jóska Sobri	1810–1837		Hungary	
William Spiggot	1691–1721		United Kingdom	A hanged highwayman and gang leader who suffered the press ordeal for not pleading.
Philip Twysden	1714–1752		United Kingdom	The Bishop of Raphoe.
Richard 'Dick' Turpin	1705-1739		United Kingdom	He was also known by his alias 'John Palmer'.
Márton Vidróczki			Hungary	
James Whitney	1660-1693		United Kingdom	Known by contemporaries as the Dandy Highwayman.

=== North America ===
Name	Life	Years active	Country of origin	Comments
Peter Alston	1765–1804		United States	highwayman, counterfeiter, and river pirate, alias James May, who was believed to be an associate of Samuel Mason and the Harpe Brothers.
John Alexander	d. 1818		United States	lower Mississippi River/Natchez Trace highwaymen associated with Joseph and Lewis Hare.
Robert H. "Three-Fingered" Birch	1827–1866		United States	a member of the infamous, 1830s-1840s, "Banditti of the Prairie", who committed highway robbery, in northern/central Illinois and an accomplice in the 1845 torture-murder of Colonel George Davenport.
Captain Thunderbolt			United States	an associate of Michael Martin, "Captain Lightfoot."
Doan Brothers			United States	Aaron, Levi, Mahlon, and Joseph Doan and cousin, Abraham were Loyalist highwaymen who operated in Pennsylvania, New Jersey, and New York during the American Revolutionary War.
James Ford	d. 1833		United States	American civic leader and business owner in western Kentucky and southern Illinois, who secretly was the leader of a gang of highwaymen and river pirates known as the "Ford's Ferry Gang."
William Goings			United States	Leader of highwaymen called, the "Goings Gang," from 1816-1820, along the Vincennes-St. Louis Trace, a frontier highway in southern Illinois, where Goings owned and ran a number of roadside taverns to rob and murder travelers. Samuel Young was an associate in the Goings Gang.
Joseph and Lewis Hare	d. 1818		United States	lower Mississippi River/Natchez Trace highwaymen and Baltimore, mail coach robbers.
Micajah and Wiley Harpe	1768-1799 (Micajah); 1770-1804 (Wiley)		United States	America's first known serial killers, were Loyalists, in the American Revolution, who preyed on travelers along the frontier highways of Tennessee, Kentucky, Illinois, and Mississippi. They were associates of Samuel Mason and Peter Alston.
Michael Martin	d. 1821		United States	last of the New England highwayman, robbed in Ireland and Massachusetts and was the legendary "Captain Lightfoot."
Samuel Mason	1739–1803		United States	Samuel Mason (1739–1803), ran a gang of highwaymen along the Natchez Trace, a gang of river pirates on the Mississippi River and at Cave-In-Rock on the Ohio River, and was an associate of the Harpe Brothers and Peter Alston.
Isaiah L. Potts	1784–?		United States	a southern Illinois tavern owner who, allegedly, was the leader of a gang of highwaymen known as the "Potts Hill Gang," along a frontier highway, near Cave-In-Rock and was an associate of James Ford.
David Lewis	1790-1820	1806-1820	United States	David Lewis A Pennsylvania counterfeiter and road agent that hid out in the Doubling Gap area of Central Pennsylvania. The gang had as many as 30 men. Captured in Driftwood, Pa.

=== Asia ===
Name	Life	Years active	Country of origin	Comments
Arattupuzha Velayudha Panicker	1825–1874	1852–1888	India	fought against oppression of lower castes by the upper castes in Kerala
Ithikkara Pakki	19th century		India	Indian Muslim outlaw active in the Travancore Kingdom during the 19th century
Jambulingam Nadar	d. 1923	–1923	India	brigand active in the southern region of the Madras Presidency during the early 20th century, shot to death by police.
Kayamkulam Kochunni	1818–1859	–1859	India	a heroic outlaw known as the Robin Hood of Kayamkulam who lived during the early 19th century in Travancore (present-day Kerala). His stories are often associated with his friend and fellow outlaw Ithikkara Pakki.
Papadu	d. 1710	1702–1709	India	a highwayman and bandit of early-18th century India who rose from humble beginnings to become a folklore hero.
