= Sturdivant Gang =

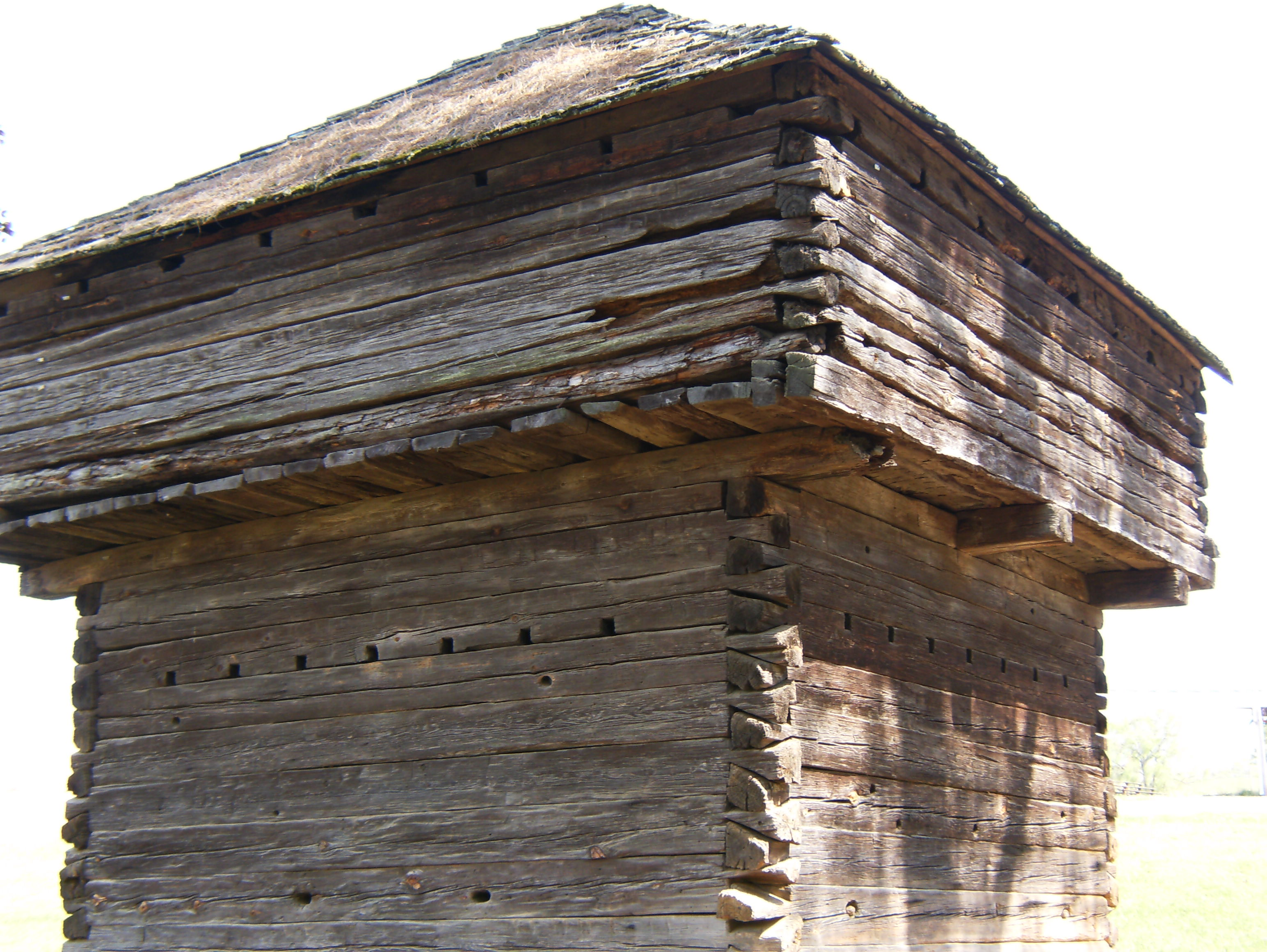
- A blockhouse similar to the ones that were attached to the four corners of the log house within "Sturdivant's Fort" by the third generation of the Sturdivant Gang in their late 1810s-early 1820s counterfeiting operation overlooking the bluff of the Ohio River at Rosiclare, Illinois
- Founded by: Sturdivant Family
- Founding location: Connecticut, Massachusetts, Ohio, Tennessee, Illinois?
- Years active: 1780s-1820s (three generations of family counterfeiters)
- Territory: Connecticut, Massachusetts, Ohio, Kentucky, Tennessee, Manville Ferry, New Athens, St. Clair County, Illinois and Sturdivant's Fort, Pope County, Illinois, present-day Rosiclare, Hardin County, Illinois
- Ethnicity: European-American
- Membership (est.): 13 or as high as 50-100
- Criminal activities: counterfeiting

Roswell S. Sturdivant
- Born: 1700s–1800s Connecticut, Massachusetts, Kentucky, or Tennessee
- Died: after 1831 (aged ?)
- Other names: Roswell Sturdivant, Roswell Sturdevant, John Sturdivant, Jack Sturdivant, Bloody Jack Sturdivant, Sturdivant the Counterfeiter
- Occupations: counterfeiter, gambler
- Spouse: 1
- Parent: Azor Sturdivant (father)
- Relatives: Merrick Sturdivant (brother), Stephen Sturdivant (brother), James Sturdivant (grandfather), Ruby Sturdevant Loveland (daughter), Merriness Loveland (son-in-law)

Merrick Sturdivant
- Born: 1700s–1800s Connecticut, Massachusetts, Kentucky, or Tennessee?
- Died: after 1831 (aged ?)
- Other name: Merrick Sturdevant
- Occupation: counterfeiter
- Parent: Azor Sturdivant (father)
- Relatives: Roswell S. Sturdivant (brother), Stephen Sturdivant (brother), James Sturdivant (grandfather), Ruby Sturdevant Loveland (niece), Merriness Loveland (nephew-in-law)

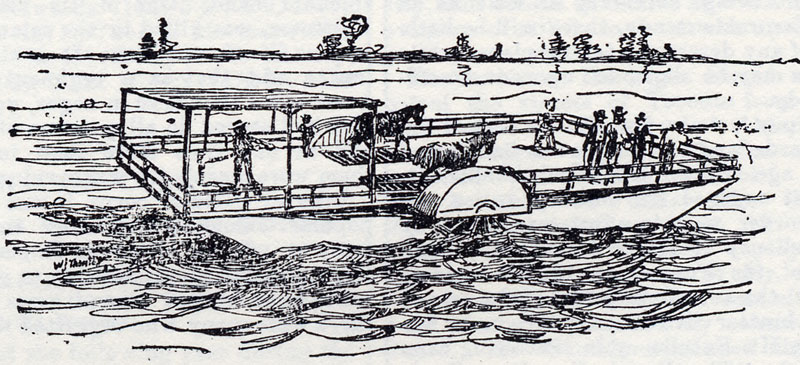
This is an early 19th century horse-powered ferry boat the kind used by Ira Manville, early settler and town namesake of Manville Ferry, St. Clair County, Illinois who ran the Manville ferry until his death in 1821. The Sturdivant Gang had counterfeiting operations at Manville Ferry now present-day New Athens, St. Clair County, Illinois.

James Ford, the ferry operator and outlaw across the Ohio River in western Kentucky knew the Sturdivant Gang and helped them disperse their counterfeit money throughout the area.

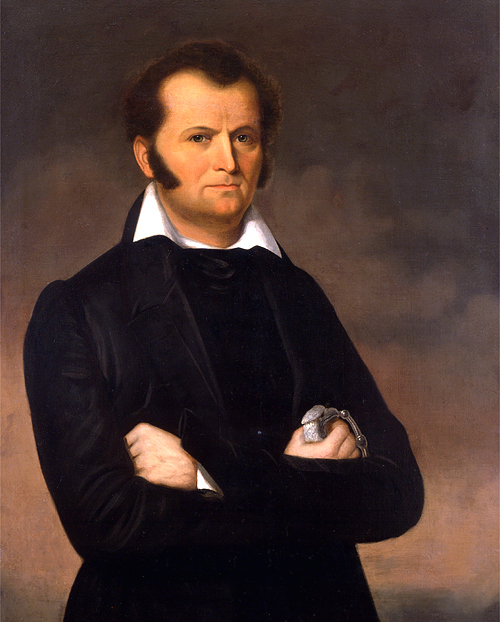
Jim Bowie (pictured) fought a bloody knife duel with Bloody Jack Sturdivant an alias of Roswell Sturdivant at Natchez-under-the-Hill in 1829, where Sturdivant was badly wounded and Bowie spared his life.

Part of a counterfeit coin mold similar to the type used by the Sturdivant Gang. The coin mold would come with two halves that would be lined with clay to make an impression of a genuine coin, would be poured into the funnel feeder cut into the side of the mold, and the fake coin later plated with a thin layer of silver. Legitimate coins were made by government mints and stamped from silver or gold coin discs as most counterfeit coins were molded.

The Spanish silver peso was the most common currency found on the American frontier. The Sturdivant Gang "coinied" this type of counterfeit money, which was minted in Mexico and considered legal tender, in the United States, until the Coinage Act of 1857.

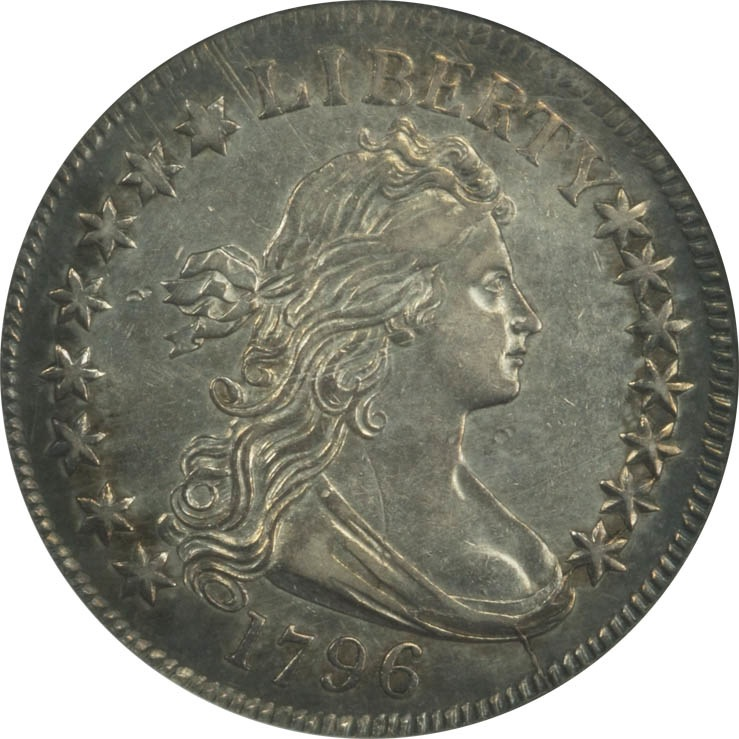
The U.S. half dollar was also highly desirable for the Sturdivant Gang to copy as it was readily available, easy to carry, and commonly used on the American frontier.

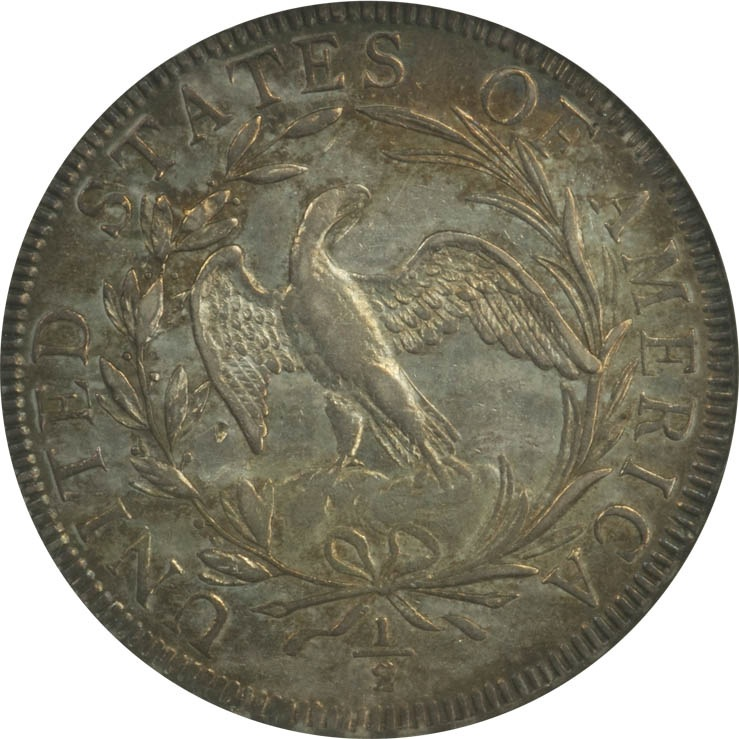
Reverse side of the 1790s U.S. half dollar

The Sturdivant Gang was a multi-generational, family gang of counterfeiters, whose criminal activities took place over a fifty-year period, from the 1780s, in Connecticut and Massachusetts, with one branch of the family going to Tennessee via Virginia and a second family branch going to Ohio and finally settled on the Illinois frontier, between the 1810s to 1830s.

== First generation of counterfeiters ==
James Sturdivant was the father of Azor Sturdivant and the grandfather of Roswell S. and Merrick Sturdivant and the gang leader of the first generation of the Sturdivant Gang of counterfeiters.

== Second generation of counterfeiters ==
Azor Sturdivant was the father of Roswell S. and Merrick Sturdivant and the gang leader of the second generation of the Sturdivant Gang of counterfeiters.

== Third generation of counterfeiters ==
=== Counterfeiting in Ohio ===
During the War of 1812, two unnamed Sturdivants were mentioned as counterfeiters operating in Kingston Township, Delaware County, Ohio in 1812. Both of these men claimed to have been digging in the woods for salt and had escaped an attack by Indians. It turned out that the counterfeiters had used this situation as a ruse to avoid being arrested so they could easily leave Ohio afterwards.

=== Counterfeiting in Illinois ===
By the 1810s, the third generation of the Sturdivant family counterfeiters were organized by brothers, Roswell S. Sturdivant and Merrick Sturdivant who claimed to be from Tennessee via Virginia. The Sturdivant brothers were Illinois-based counterfeiters conducting their criminal operations in western and southeast Illinois. Even before the Sturdivant family counterfeiters arrived in Illinois, counterfeiting was already a public menace in the future state. As the Governor of Illinois Thomas Ford described in his book, A History of Illinois from Its Commencement as a State from 1818 to 1847, "In 1816 and '17, in the towns of the territory [ Illinois Territory ], the country was overrun with horse-thieves and counterfeiters. They were so numerous, and so well combined together in many counties, as to set the laws at defiance."

=== Roswell Sturdivant ===
According to the first Illinois census in 1818, Roswell Sturdivant and his wife were living in Madison County, Illinois. Roswell was later listed on the 1820 U.S. Census as residing in St. Clair County, Illinois.

Roswell Sturdivant, the most prominent member and leader of the third generation of the Sturdivant family gang in Illinois was referred to as "Sturdivant the Counterfeiter" by Judge James Hall in his 1835 book, Sketches of History, Life, and Manners, in the West described him as follows:

"At a later period, the celebrated counterfeiter, Sturdivant, fixed his residence on the shore of the Ohio, in Illinois, and for several years set the laws at defiance. He was a man of talent and address. He was possessed of much mechanical genius, was an expert artist and was skilled in some of the sciences. As an engraver he was said to have few superiors; and he excelled in some other branches of art. For several years he resided at a secluded spot in Illinois, where all his immediate neighbors were his confederates or persons whose friendship he had conciliated. He could, at any time, by the blowing of a horn, summon some fifty to a hundred armed men to his defense; while the few quiet farmers around, who lived near enough to get their feelings enlisted and who were really not at all implicated in his crimes, rejoiced in the impunity with which he practiced his schemes. He was a grave, quiet, inoffensive man in his manners, who commanded the obedience of his comrades and the respect of his neighbors. He had a very excellent farm; his house was one of the best in the country; his domestic arrangements were liberal and well ordered."

=== Counterfeiting at Manville Ferry ===
East of St. Louis, Missouri and the Mississippi River, Manville Ferry now present-day New Athens, Illinois was a settlement in St. Clair County, Illinois on the Kaskaskia River founded by early settler and ferryman, Ira Manville who ran the ferry until his death in 1821. Roswell Sturdivant would lead the counterfeiting operations of the Sturdivant Gang at Manville Ferry.

=== Counterfeiting at Sturdivant's Fort ===
The Sturdivant Gang was often confused with the counterfeiter John Duff, who operated, from 1790 to 1799, around the region of Illinois and Kentucky, near Cave-in-Rock, by 19th and early 20th-century historians. These notorious counterfeiters were also the criminal contemporaries of James Ford and the Ford's Ferry Gang and his partner, Isaiah L. Potts, alias "Billy Potts" and the Potts Hill Gang.

Merrick Sturdivant led the gang's counterfeiting operation at what came known as "Sturdivant's Fort" in Pope County, Illinois, now Rosiclare, Hardin County, Illinois. Although the Sturdivant Gang did not base their counterfeiting operations directly at Cave-in-Rock, on the Ohio River, in Pope County, Illinois, now Hardin County, Illinois, they were considered part of the second wave of criminal activity, associated within sphere of influence of the region of the landmark Cave.

The Sturdivant brothers counterfeit money-making factory inside Sturdivant's Fort, was a heavily fortified, two-story, log blockhouse with a defensive stockade around it. Sturdivant's Fort had an interior stairway inside the blockhouse that was protected and defended by a cannon, trained at the exterior door of the blockhouse. The blockhouse fortress was strategically located downriver, from Cave-In-Rock, at the top of a cliff, overlooking the Ohio River, and clearly visible from the Cave-in-Rock bluff. The counterfeiters' blockhouse was raided by local law enforcement and regulator/vigilantes, in 1822 and by citizen mob action, twice, in 1823, which finally drove out the Sturdivant Gang from the lower Ohio River valley. In his book, A History of Illinois from Its Commencement as a State from 1818 to 1847, Illinois governor Thomas Ford incorrectly claimed that the Sturdivant Gang was driven out from Sturdivant's Fort in 1831.

The criminal activities, arrests, and court appearances of Roswell and Merrick Sturdivant and their gang around Sturdivant's Fort are well-documented as early as 1819 in the surviving Pope County, Illinois court records in Golconda as well as in the 1820-1824 issues of the short-lived Illinois Gazette newspaper in Shawneetown, Illinois.

=== Roswell "Bloody Jack" Sturdivant in Natchez ===
After the breakup and demise of the Sturdivant Gang in Illinois, Roswell Sturdivant went his separate way and relocated sometime in the 1820s to Natchez, Mississippi. In Natchez, Sturdivant became known as John, Jack, and "Bloody Jack" Sturdivant by switching to the profession of a professional gambler in a Mississippi River, waterfront gambling den, in the criminal-infested section of Natchez called "Natchez-under-the-Hill". In 1829, Bloody Jack Sturdivant was a dealer in a faro card game and cheated a friend of James Bowie named Dr. William Lattimore, out his money. Bowie, who sat for the next hand, won back all the money lost by his friend, which caused "Bloody Jack" Sturdivant to feel slighted and he foolishly challenged Bowie to a knife duel. Jim Bowie, with his left wrist tied to Sturdivant's, won the knife fight, by severely cutting the wrist of Sturdivant with his infamous Bowie knife but spared his life. In return, Bowie received a horrible leg wound from Sturdivant.

== Notable gang members ==
- James Belden
- Black (first name unknown)
- William Caldwell
- Lewis Field
- Syrus Halberd
- James Leach
- Jacob Robertson
- Small (first name unknown)
- James Steele
- Azor Sturdivant
- James Sturdivant
- Merrick Sturdivant
- Roswell Sturdivant
- Stephen Sturdivant

A rough line drawing of the location, layout, and approximate dimensions of Sturdivant's Fort compiled from survey information of historians, Ron Nelson and Gary DeNeal presented in their article, "To find a fort: The search for Sturdivant's lair"

== Site of Sturdivant's Fort ==
As late as 1876, the ruins of Sturdivant's Fort could still be seen. Dr. Daniel Lawrence of Golconda, Illinois a visitor to the historic site noted that all that existed of the once imposing fortress was a dilapidated blockhouse but what remained revealed it had formerly been a substantial log structure. Dr. Lawrence also discovered numerous bullet holes in the old logs. Eventually, the fort ruins were torn down. In 1998, Ron Nelson and Gary DeNeal local historians in Hardin County, Illinois researched the former location of Sturdivant's Fort using surviving early 19th century land ownership records. The former site of the Sturdivant Gang fort is now on private property where it is located in the undeveloped backyard lot of a residential house, just north of the present-day water tower in Rosiclare. Nelson and DeNeal got permission from the owner to investigate. To physically locate the fort site they use dowsing rods and red flags to mark the perimeters and layout of the structures where they had stood in the past. Nelson and DeNeal later described their findings in an article in Springhouse Magazine, "To find a fort: The search for Sturdivant's lair".

"We found that the log house in the center of the fort was approximately 60' x 60'. In comparison, the Old Slave House in Gallatin County [Illinois] is 50' x 50'. There were six rooms, three on each side, separated by a 4' hallway running east and west. The front two rooms, facing the river, measured 20 1/2' x 28'. The back four rooms were of equal size and measured 17' x 28'. There was an extension on the northwest corner of the house, 18' x 18'. Extending from the corners of the log house were four corridors approximately 100' long, evidently leading to the corner blockhouses. There was a palisade surrounding the perimeter of the house. There was also an outer perimeter palisade encompassing the entire property. From documents, we know that the house was 1 1/2 to 2 stories high."

== In popular culture ==
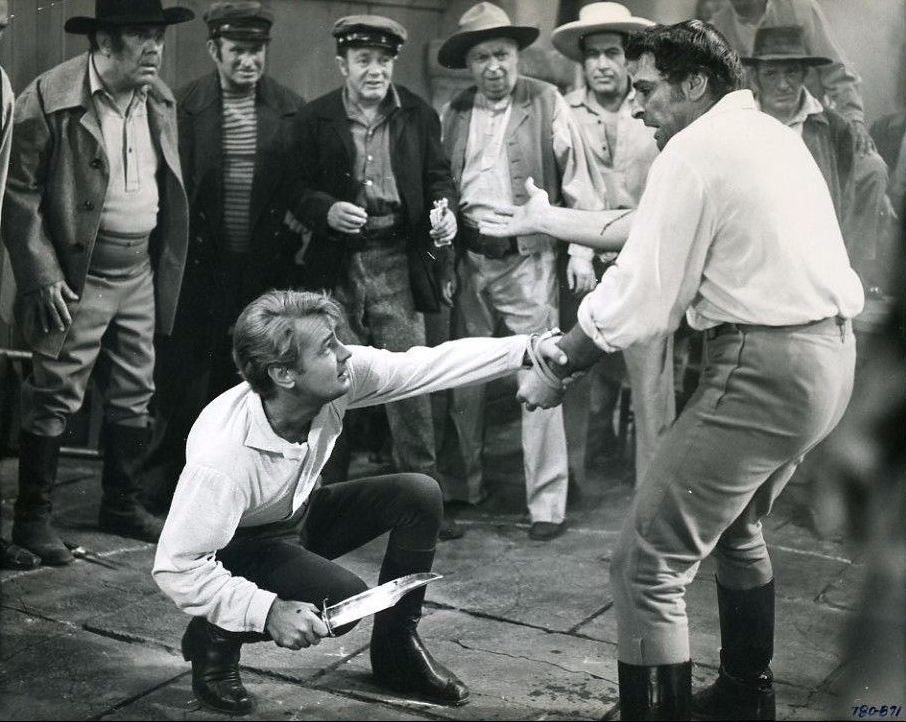
"Bloody Jack" Sturdivant portrayed by American actor, Tony Caruso (on the right) in a knife dueling scene with James Bowie played by Alan Ladd in the 1952 film, The Iron Mistress.

The 1952 film, The Iron Mistress, based on Paul Wellman's 1951 novel, starring Alan Ladd as Jim Bowie and Tony Caruso as "Bloody Jack" Sturdevant, also known as Roswell S. Sturdivant, depicts a Hollywood version of the infamous Bowie duel at Natchez Under The Hill. In 1964, Wellman also published the book, Spawn of Evil, which went into more depth about Roswell Sturdivant and his gang and the crime network on the early American frontier.

== See also ==
- Peter Alston
- Edward Bonney
- Abel Buell
- Mary Butterworth
- Counterfeit money
- Sile Doty
- David Farnsworth
- Catherine Murphy
- John Murrell
- Stack Island (Mississippi River)
- Samuel C. Upham
