= Cave-In-Rock, Illinois =

Cave-In-Rock
- Village
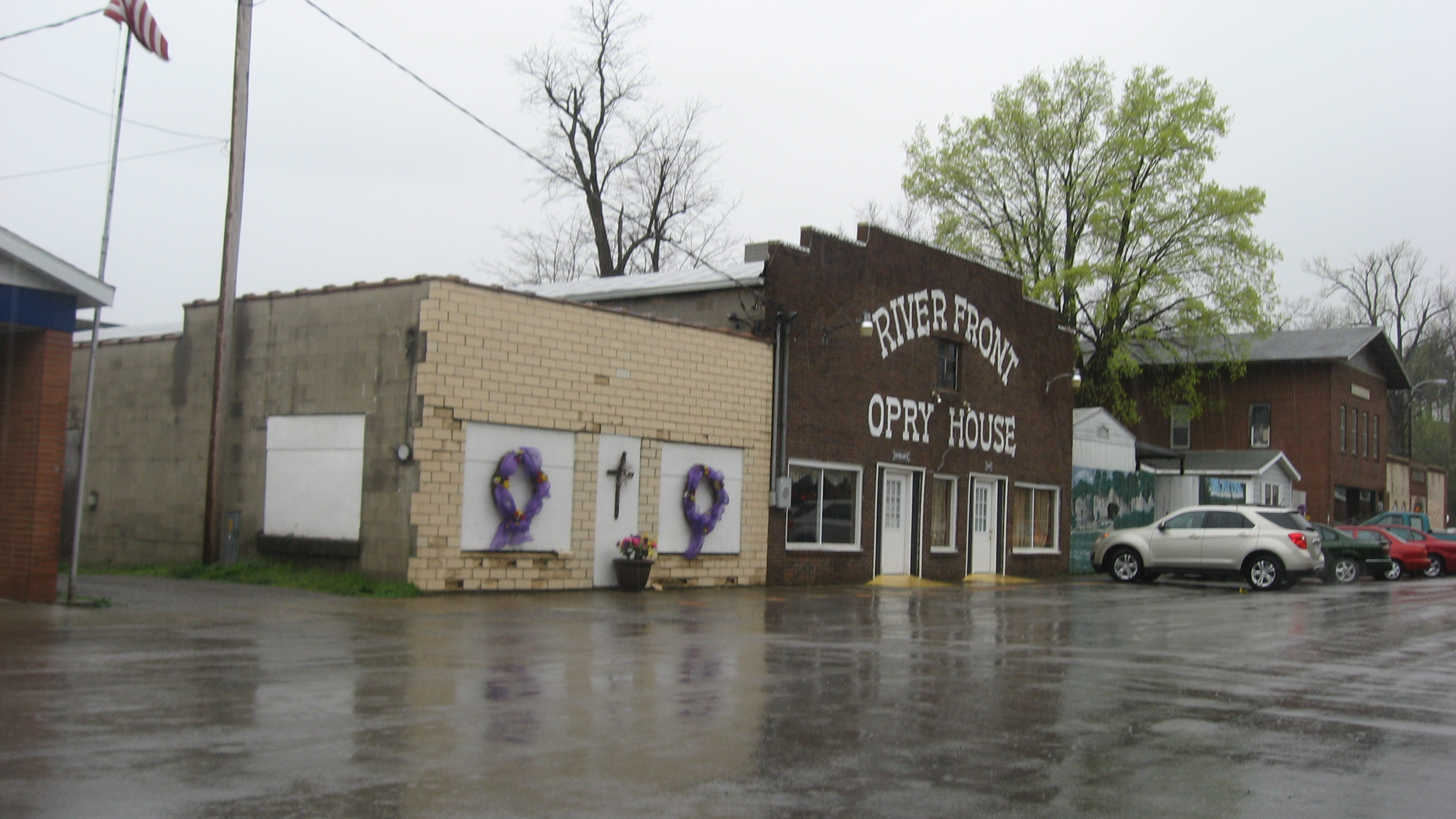
- Main Street of downtown Cave-In-Rock, Illinois in 2013

- Location of Cave-In-Rock in Hardin County, Illinois.
- Coordinates: 37°28′15″N 88°09′57″W
- Country: United States
- State: Illinois
- County: Hardin
- Founder: Earliest known permanent settlers arrived in 1816
- Named for: The Cave near the town

Area
  - Total: 0.41 sq mi (1.07 km^{2})
  - Land: 0.37 sq mi (0.97 km^{2})
  - Water: 0.042 sq mi (0.11 km^{2})
- Elevation: 387 ft (118 m)

Population (2020)
  - Total: 228
  - Density: 610.3/sq mi (235.65/km^{2})
- Time zone: UTC-6 (CST)
  - Summer (DST): UTC-5 (CDT)
- ZIP code: 62919
- Area code: 618
- FIPS code: 17-11826
- GNIS feature ID: 2397577

Cave-In-Rock is a village in Hardin County, Illinois, United States. Its principal feature and tourist attraction is nearby Cave-In-Rock, on the banks of the Ohio River. In 1816, the earliest known permanent white settlers arrived and started building a town near the cave. The town was originally known as Rock and Cave, Illinois, with a post office under this name. On October 24, 1849, the town was officially renamed Cave-In-Rock. Cave-In-Rock was incorporated as a village in 1901. The population was 228 at the 2020 census.

Beginning in the 1790s, Cave-in-Rock became a refuge stronghold for frontier outlaws, on the run from the law which included river pirates and highwaymen Samuel Mason and James Ford, tavern owner/highwayman Isaiah L. Potts, serial killers/bandits the Harpe brothers, counterfeiters Philip Alston, Peter Alston, John Duff, Eson Bixby, and the Sturdivant Gang, and the post-American Civil War bandit, Logan Belt.

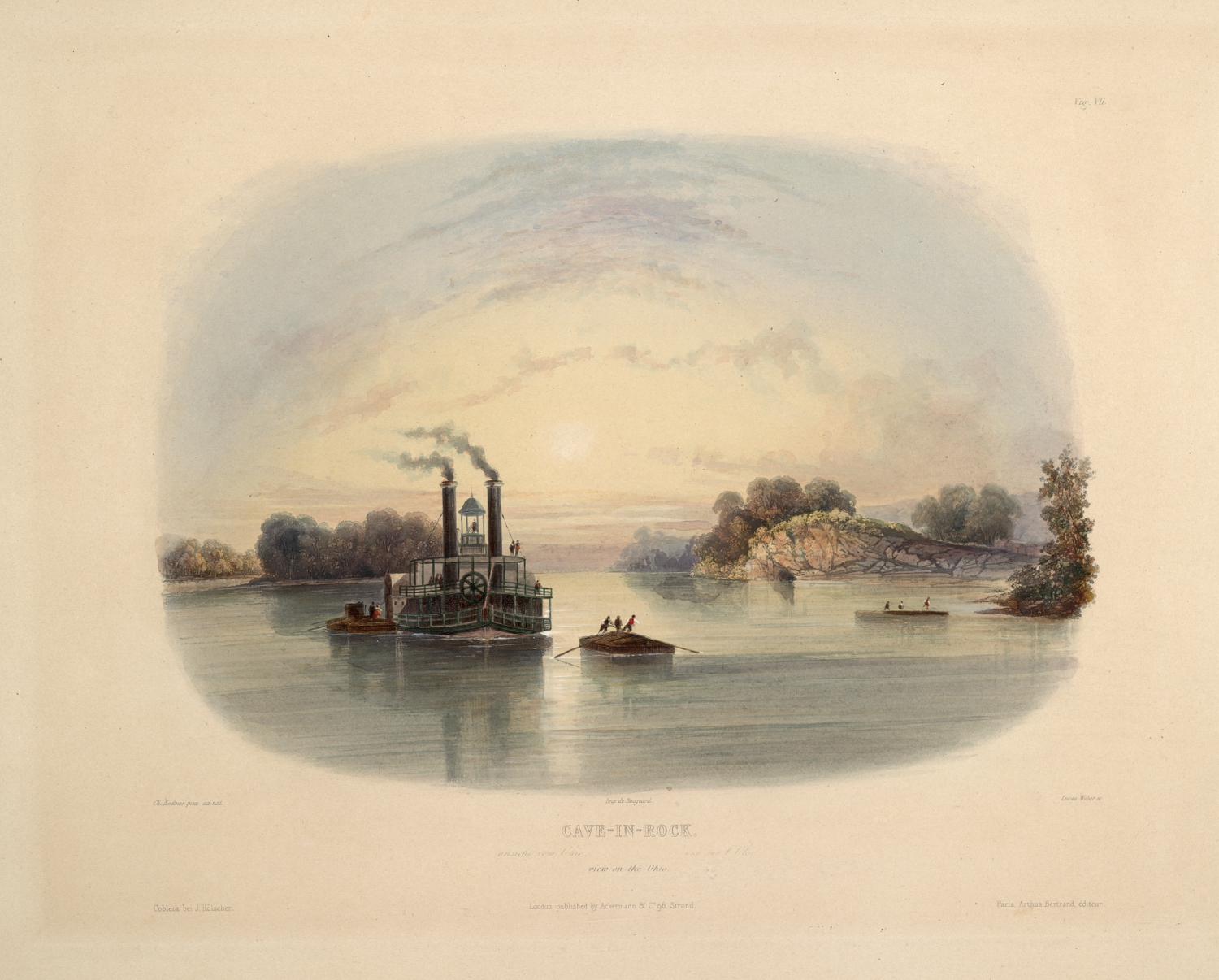
Cave-in-rock, view on the Ohio (circa 1832): aquatint by Karl Bodmer from the book Maximilian, Prince of Wied's Travels in the Interior of North America, During the Years 1832–1834

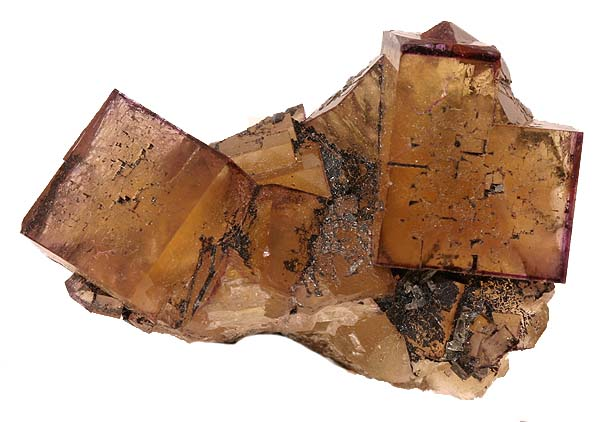
Fluorite mineral specimen from Cave-in-Rock area

== History ==
From the 1790s to the 1870s, the area around Cave-in-Rock was plagued by what historians as early as the 1830s referred to as the "Ancient Colony of Horse-Thieves, Counterfeiters and Robbers", and better known today due to Otto Rothert's book early in the 20th century as the "Outlaws of Cave-in-Rock".

In 1790, counterfeiters Philip Alston and John Duff (or John McElduff) used the cave as some type of rendezvous, though details are scarce. Although folklore printed in 19th century histories failed to establish a prior connection between the two men, both had lived in the area of Natchez, Mississippi, at the start of the Revolutionary War.

Duff was living upriver a few miles, either at Battery Rock or across the Ohio River at what would become Caseyville, Kentucky, when in 1797 Samuel Mason moved his base of operations from Diamond Island and Red Banks to the cave and made it the home of river pirates. Two of Mason's brothers had been business partners of Duff in Kaskaskia, Illinois, in the 1780s. Mason created a combination tavern, gambling den, brothel, and criminal refuge. His men lured in gullible river travelers, then robbed and killed them.

James Wilson, also known as Bully Wilson, may actually have been an alias for Samuel Mason, the next leader of the gang after Mason's hasty departure, or possibly the front man for Mason's operation. He may be the Wilson who married one of Mason's nieces. In 1799, he hung a sign over the cave's entrance saying "Wilson's Liquor Vault and House for Entertainment".

By this time, Duff and his associates had been making salt (or looking for silver) in the area around the Illinois Salines along the Saline River in southeastern Illinois. A detachment from the U.S. Army garrison at Fort Massac, down river from Cave-In-Rock, captured him and three of his men, Blakely, Hazle and Hall. The soldiers took their prisoners by boat down the Saline River to the Ohio River, intending to return to the fort. Old histories do not explain why they stopped at the cave. Subsequent events suggest it took place during the spring of 1799, when Wilson was in business, making it a stop for entertainment. Duff and his men escaped and overpowered the soldiers. They tied them up, put them in a boat, and pushed it into the river to float downstream to the fort. On June 4, 1799, the commandant of Fort Massac, Captain Zebulon Pike Sr., father of the future explorer of Pikes Peak, hired a French Canadian coureur de bois and three Shawnee warriors to assassinate Duff, which they did.

The infamous Harpe brothers also reached the cave region in the spring of 1799. They are associated with two separate stories at the cave and one at the infamous Potts Spring area to the north. The first story has them pushing a young couple off the top of the cliff above the cave. They survived. The second was an act of piracy in which only one man survived. Later, he was forced off the cliff as well, this time involving the man being tied down to a horse. Neither survived. The Potts Spring story is recalled as a murder of two or three hunters. This Harpe murder site within twenty years would become the future location of the legendary Potts Inn, which was presumed to be a human death trap for unsuspecting travelers along the Ford's Ferry High Water Road, an early frontier highway, who wanted to spend the night for food and lodging.

Mason and Wilson's time at the cave may have come to an end during the summer of 1799, when they were attacked by a group of bounty hunters/vigilantes under the leadership of Captain Young calling themselves "The Exterminators". No contemporary accounts attest to river pirates occupying the cave in the first decade of the 19th century. The Harpes retreated back into Kentucky, while Mason traveled downriver and began to focus on highway robbery along the Natchez Trace.

The next generation of outlaws in the region sprang either from the Sturdivant Gang, a group of counterfeiters based at Sturdivant Fort, on top of the bluffs overlooking the Ohio River at what is now Rosiclare, Illinois; or the Ford's Ferry Gang led by James Ford, based a few miles upriver from the cave at what became known as Ford's Ferry, Kentucky. Law enforcement officials led three raids against Sturdivant Fort in 1822 and 1823. Although it is not clear what happened following the raids, the gang had disappeared from the area by 1830. The Ford's Ferry Gang was broken up following the mysterious deaths or murders of James Ford's two sons, followed by his own assassination in 1833.

Even after the death of Ford, outlaws remained. Isaiah L. Potts operated Potts Inn on the Ford's Ferry High Water Road in Illinois north of the cave. Travelers checked in, but sometimes failed to check out. This presumed frontier hotel was very similar to the Bloody Benders' Wayside Inn, which appeared fifty years later in Labette County, Kansas. The legend of Billy Potts, the returning son who was murdered unknowingly by his father, likely took place in the months following Ford's assassination. This tragic story of poetic justice has taken on folklorish proportions. Records show the elder Potts and his wife separated in 1834 or 1835.

Eson Bigsby (the first name sometimes spelled "Eason" or "Enos" and the last name sometimes spelled "Bixby") took up counterfeiting in Hardin County in the decades following the Sturdivants. His attack on his wife Anna in an effort to find out where her first husband's money was buried dates to the early 1860s and led to the legends of Anna Bixby, her treasure and her ghost. She survived running off a cliff in the dark. She is the namesake of the Anna Bixby Women's Center in nearby Harrisburg, Illinois.

Although not completely connected to the "Ancient Colony", Logan Belt and the Logan Belt Gang terrorized Hardin County in the 1870s and 1880s, until Belt was assassinated.

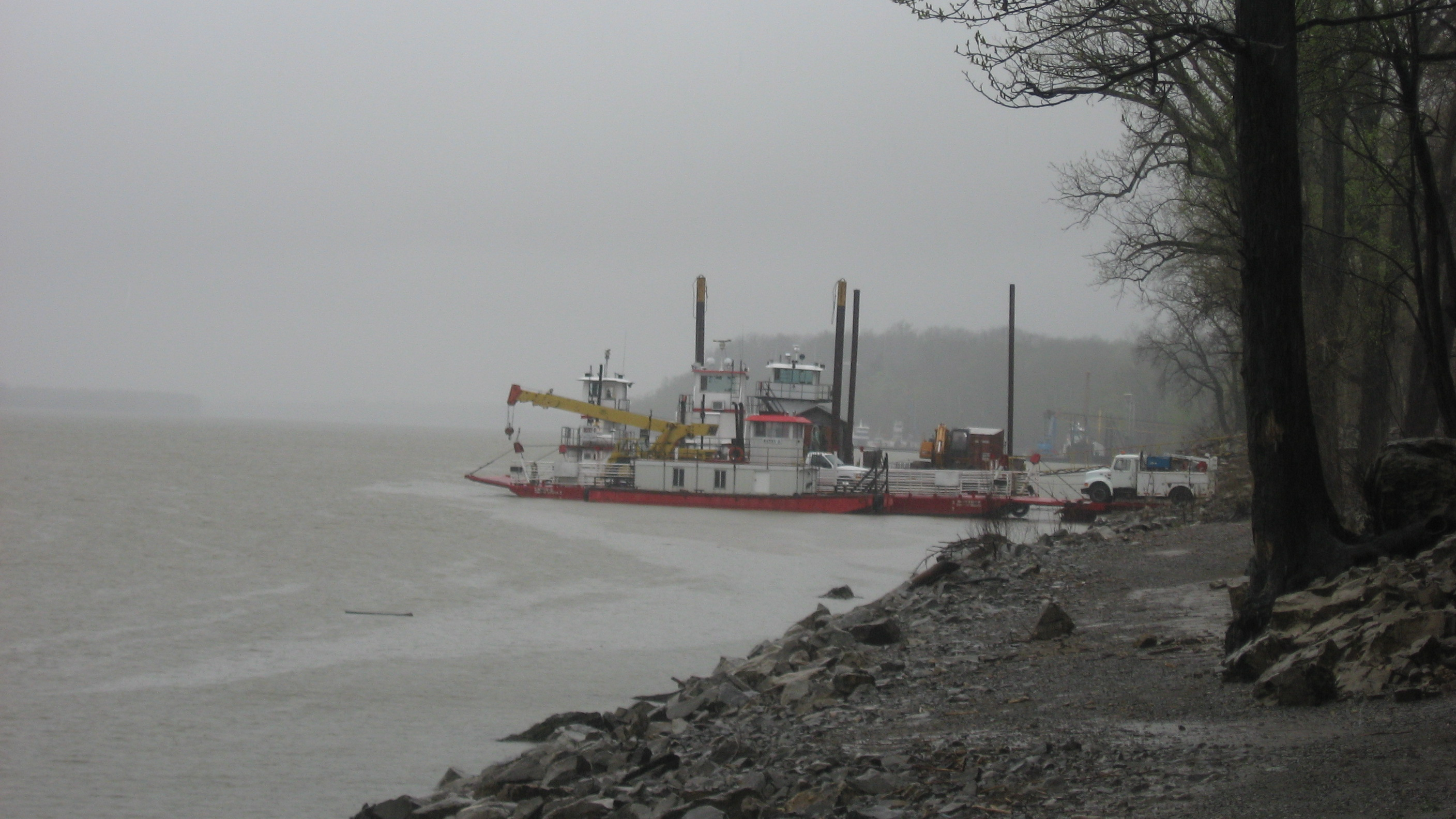
Loading a vehicle onto the Cave-In-Rock Ferry in 2013

In the middle of the 1800s, church services were being held in the cave. This earliest Christian congregation eventually formed the Big Creek Baptist Church. Founded in 1807, it was the first church organized in southeastern Illinois. Cave-In-Rock incorporated in 1839; this is the same year that Hardin County was created from a section of Pope County.

According to the Illinois Department of Natural Resources, "in 1929, the State of Illinois acquired 64.5 acres (26.1 ha) for a park that since has increased to 204 acres (83 ha). The well-wooded, 60-foot (18 m) hills and the rugged bluffs along the river—commanding expansive views of the famous waterway—became Cave-In-Rock State Park".

== Geography ==
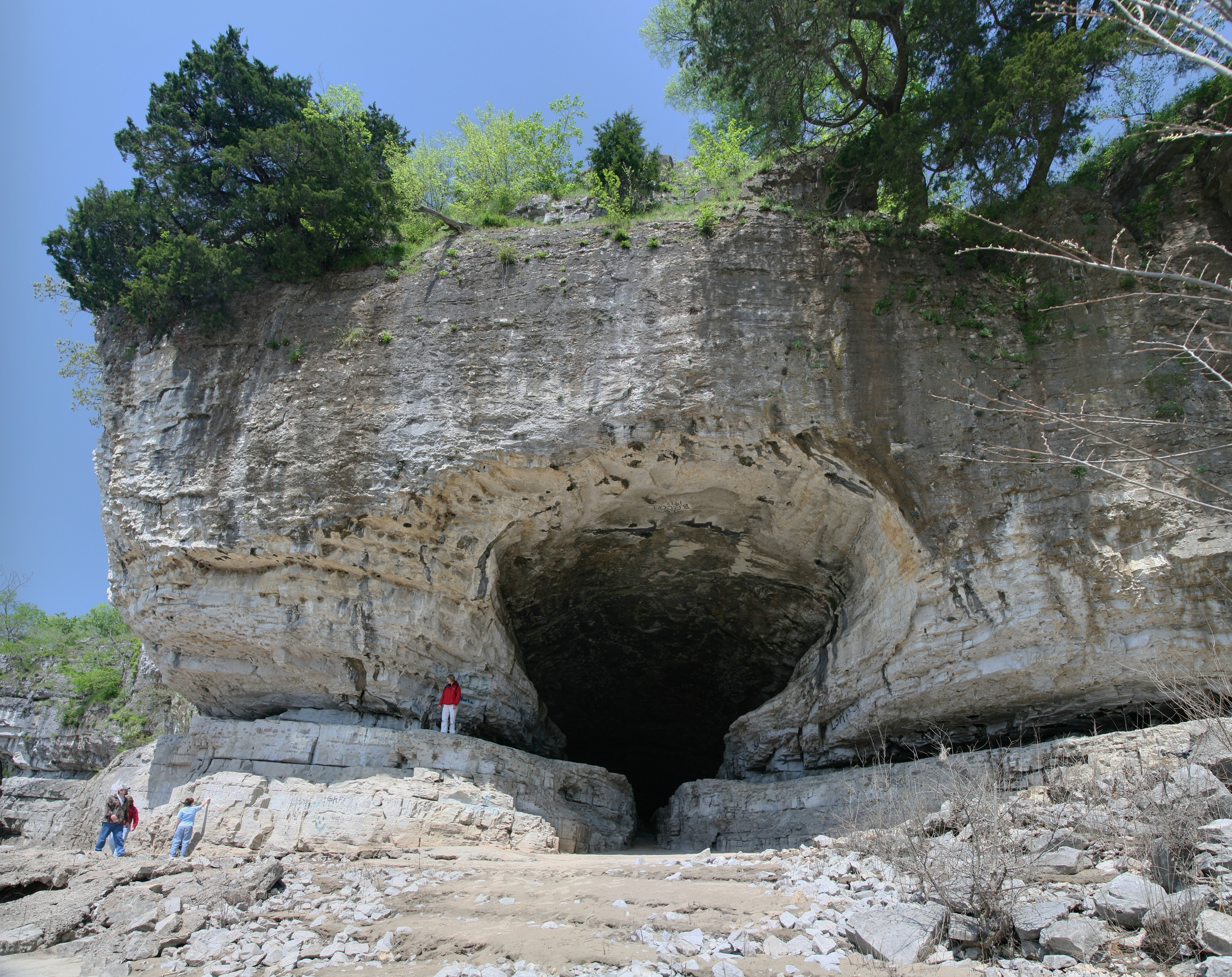
The Cave at Cave-in-Rock State Park, the town namesake of Cave-in-Rock, Illinois

Cave-In-Rock is located in southeastern Hardin County and is bordered to the south by the Ohio River, which forms the state boundary with Kentucky. The Cave-In-Rock Ferry crosses the Ohio from Cave-In-Rock village to Crittenden County, Kentucky, at a point 11 miles (18 km) north of Marion. Cave-In-Rock is the southern terminus of Illinois Route 1, which leads north from the ferry 326 miles (525 km) to its northern terminus in Chicago.

According to the 2021 census gazetteer files, Cave-In-Rock has a total area of 0.42 square miles (1.09 km^{2}), of which 0.37 square miles (0.96 km^{2}) (or 90.12%) is land and 0.04 square miles (0.10 km^{2}) (or 9.88%) is water.

Cave-in-Rock is located in the driftless area of southern Illinois and features geographical differential erosions from the Upper Mississippian and Lower Pennsylvanian ages. Bluffs and ridges are generally sandstone, while valleys are from limestones and shales. Cave-in-Rock is near the Hicks Dome.

=== The Cave ===
Cave-in-Rock's primary feature is a striking 55-foot-wide (17 m) riverside cave formed by wind and water erosion and by cataclysmic effects of the 1811–12 New Madrid earthquakes. The cave is located at 37°28′07″N 88°09′21″W, just upriver (east) from the village. The first European to come across it was M. de Lery of France, who found it in 1739 and called it "caverne dans Le Roc". Other names for the cave include Rock-In-Cave, Rocking Cave, Rock-and-Cave, House of Nature, The Cave, Big Cave, and Murrell's Cave. The cave is the main feature of Illinois' Cave-in-Rock State Park, established in 1929.

== Demographics ==
Historical population
Census	Pop.	Note	%±
1910	306		—
1920	349		14.1%
1930	430		23.2%
1940	486		13.0%
1950	550		13.2%
1960	495		−10.0%
1970	503		1.6%
1980	468		−7.0%
1990	381		−18.6%
2000	346		−9.2%
2010	318		−8.1%
2020	228		−28.3%
U.S. Decennial Census

As of the 2020 census there were 228 people, 69 households, and 37 families residing in the village. The population density was 549.40 inhabitants per square mile (212.12/km^{2}). There were 171 housing units at an average density of 412.05 per square mile (159.09/km^{2}). The racial makeup of the village was 92.98% White, 0.00% African American, 0.00% Native American, 0.88% Asian, 0.00% Pacific Islander, 0.00% from other races, and 6.14% from two or more races. Hispanic or Latino of any race were 1.32% of the population.

There were 69 households, out of which 29.0% had children under the age of 18 living with them, 40.58% were married couples living together, 7.25% had a female householder with no husband present, and 46.38% were non-families. 43.48% of all households were made up of individuals, and 24.64% had someone living alone who was 65 years of age or older. The average household size was 3.89 and the average family size was 2.88.

The village's age distribution consisted of 15.1% under the age of 18, 9.0% from 18 to 24, 34.1% from 25 to 44, 17% from 45 to 64, and 24.6% who were 65 years of age or older. The median age was 36.7 years. For every 100 females, there were 80.9 males. For every 100 females age 18 and over, there were 81.7 males.

The median income for a household in the village was $24,583, and the median income for a family was $49,583. Males had a median income of $20,357 versus $17,396 for females. The per capita income for the village was $37,208. About 21.6% of families and 23.6% of the population were below the poverty line, including 23.3% of those under age 18 and 10.2% of those age 65 or over.

== In popular culture ==
In Walt Disney's Davy Crockett and the River Pirates, Davy Crockett and Mike Fink anachronistically fight Sam Mason and his pirates. Also, at Walt Disney World's Magic Kingdom, there is a scene called "Cut-Throat Corner" and "Wilson's Cave Inn" that can be seen on the bank of the Rivers of America while riding the Liberty Belle Riverboat around Tom Sawyer's Island. This scene is based upon the real life Cave-In-Rock and the activity of river pirates during that time period.

A scene of the MGM classic How the West Was Won was filmed at the cave as well as at Battery Rock. In 1997, The History Channel show In Search of History filmed at the site for an episode entitled "River Pirates".

The "ninth book" of Christopher Ward's 1932 novel The Strange Adventures of Jonathan Drew; A Rolling Stone is titled "Cave-In-Rock". The action is set in 1824. Jonathan rescues two slaves duped into running away and working for a gang of dangerous outlaws who use Cave-In-Rock as their base of operations.

The Gathering of the Juggalos was held in Cave-In-Rock from 2007 to 2013.

The multi-day heavy metal festival Full Terror Assault (FTA Open Air) takes place once a year at the Hogrock Ranch & Campground.

L. A. Meyer's novel Mississippi Jack features the heroine leading an anachronistic raid against river pirates as an homage to the aforementioned Davy Crockett episode.

In 2009, artist Greg Stimac photographed Cave-In-Rock's cave for his series of outlaw hideouts. In 2013, his photograph "Ancient Colony of Horse-Thieves, Counterfeiters and Robbers" was included in The Seven Borders, an exhibition curated by Joey Yates at the Kentucky Museum of Art and Craft.

== See also ==
- List of cities and towns along the Ohio River
