= William Spiggot =

English highwayman (1691–1721)

William Spiggot/Spigget
- Born: 1691 or 1692; Hereford, Herefordshire, England
- Died: 11 February 1721 (age 29); Tyburn Tree Gallows, Middlesex, London, England
- Occupations: apprentice to a cabinet-maker or joyner, highwayman, thief, convict
- Known for: Highway robbery, leader of a gang, his refusal to plead which led to his being pressed (peine forte et dure) and his execution at Tyburn

William Spiggot (also spelled Spigget) was a highwayman who was captured by Jonathan Wild's men in 1721. During his trial at the Old Bailey, he at first refused to plead and was therefore sentenced to be pressed until he pleaded. This was called Peine forte et dure. He was later executed, after a second trial when he pleaded not guilty, on 11 February 1721 at Tyburn, London.

== Biography ==
William Spiggot or Spigget was born in Hereford, England. His father was an innkeeper (or ostler in the English of the time) at the Chief Inn. He was married (probably at 19 years old) and he had three children. He declared that he was an apprentice to a cabinet-maker or joiner in Hereford. He is best known for his criminal life as a highwayman.

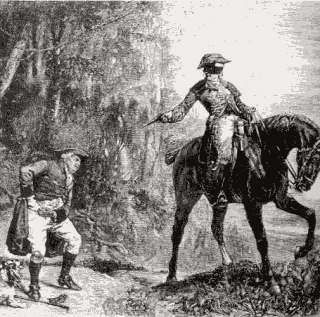
Illustration of a Highwayman

=== Criminal Life ===
For about seven to twelve years, William Spiggot was a highwayman and the leader of a gang of at least eight men. He performed his robberies on the roads from London to Hounslow Heath, Kingston and Ware. The exact number of his crimes is unknown, yet according to the Ordinary of Newgate, Spiggot had declared to him that "it was in vain to mention his numerous Robberies on the High-Way, being perhaps about a Hundred".

His criminal life came to an end when he was arrested along with other members of his gang in January 1721, in a tavern at Westminster by the men of the famous thief-taker Jonathan Wild. John Merrit, who apprehended Spiggot and his gang, claimed that the actual arrest was of a violent sort. Spiggot was described as very reluctant on being taken and fought back, eventually shooting his landlord, Mr Rowlet, in the shoulder. According to another witness, Spiggot swore on his arrest that "he would kill a thousand before he would be taken".

=== First Trial and Refusal to Plead ===
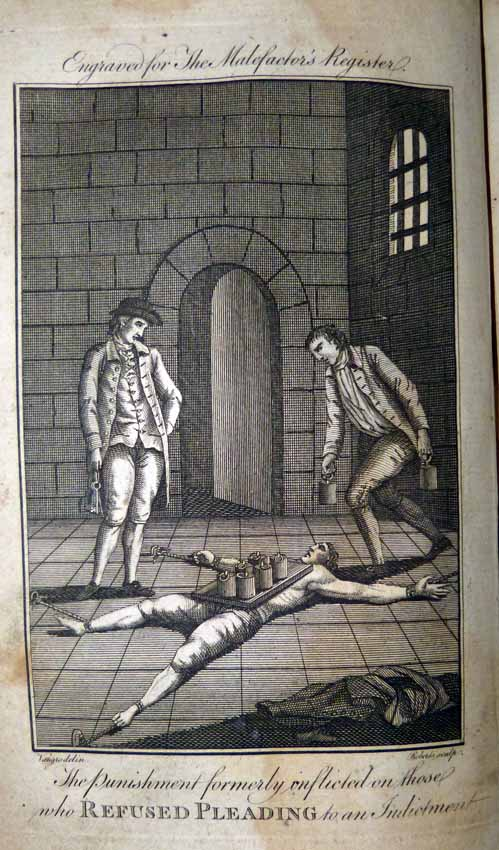
The punishment peine forte et dure for a refusal to plead in London. Engraving published in the 1780 edition of the Malefactor's Register or Newgate Calendar

During the 13 January 1721 session at the Old Bailey Court, William Spiggot and Thomas Phillips (alias Cross) were judged for highway robberies and violent thefts. But as they were brought to the bar, they refused to plead. They declared that until their belongings, money and horses were given back to them, they would remain silent. The court reminded them of William and Mary's 1692 act titled "An Act for encourageing the apprehending of Highway Men". Part IV of this act stipulates clearly that when highwaymen are arrested, the apprehender can take the horses, money and other belongings from the felon. Still they both refused to speak. At the time, a refusal to plead would lead to a heavy judgement also called Peine forte et dure, which is to be pressed with heavy weights either until death or until one would speak. The judge threatened them, describing how the sentence should be carried out. The atrocity of the sentence was thought to dissuade felons from non pleading and that they would submit themselves to a trial by a jury. But still, the convicts stayed mute.

They were brought back to Newgate Prison to receive their sentence. On their arrival in the Press (the room where the heavy judgment should be carried out), Thomas Phillips asked to be brought back to court in order to plead. On the other hand, Spiggot endured the Press. His legs and arms were kept outstreched by cords, while he laid almost naked on the floor. Some 350 pounds (about 160 kg) of iron were put on his breast. Apart for groans and "pray for me!", Spiggot kept silent. He had just a cloth covering his face but he also complained about a heavy weight on his head; according to the Ordinary of Newgate Thomas Purney, this was due to the blood pressure as the blood was "flush'd and forc'd up into his face". After half an hour, 50 pounds (about 23 kg) were added on his chest. The excruciating pain made the weak prisoner accept to be brought back to court in order to plead not guilty.

=== Second Trial ===
Brought back to court, Spiggot and Phillips pleaded not guilty on their new trial. They were accused of assaulting John Watkins on the Highway on 12 November 1720 and robbing him "a Silver Watch, a Holland Gown, a pair of Stays, a Scarlet Riding-Hood lined with Silk, with divers other Goods, and 5 l. in Money, in all to the value of 200 l". They were also convicted with one of their associates, William Heater, for another highway robbery, attacking John Turner on 1 November 1720 and stealing " [his]5 Guineas [...] and 1 Box, a Gold Watch, 12 Holland Shirts, 2 pair of Lace Ruffles, 2 Cambrick Bosoms. 2 Lawn, Turnovers, 2 Muslin Turnovers, 2 pair of Stockings, a Hat, a Perriwig, &c. and 12 Guineas, the Goods and Money of Neal Sheldon, Esq".

When he testified, John Watkins declared that he recognized Spiggot, knowing him for some years. On the contrary, the gang that attacked John Turner were on horseback and wore masks. The testimonies suggested that some of Turner's stolen goods were found at Spiggot's lodgings. Among the witnesses, six people described Spiggot's gang's violent arrest. They made him appear as a very impetuous man, not eager to surrender and who was difficult to catch. Even one of his former accomplices, Joseph Lindsey, testified against him.

Heater was described as the man in charge of renting horses and receiving the stolen goods. Even Spiggot and Phillips declared that he was innocent. This declarations and the lack of proofs found against him made the jury acquit Heater.

The proceedings do not recollect any defence from the prisoners. The jury found Spiggot and Phillips guilty and they were sentenced to death.

=== Third Trial ===
On the same session of 13 January 1721, Spiggot was cited in the next trial along with another prisoner William Bourroughs of Finchley. They were indicted for highway robbery. Charles Sybbald prosecuted them for assaulting him on the Highway near Finchley Common on 25 August 1720. According to the victim, they stole "15 Guineas and 10 Shillings in Money". Again the accomplice of Spiggot, Joseph Lindsey testified against him. Lindsey clearly declared that he participated in the attack of Sybbald and his man. The three armed robbers were on horseback. However, Sybbald recognized only Lindsey having seen his face and heard his voice during the assault. The two other attackers had indeed covered up their faces. Burroughs' brother also testified during the trial. He claimed that Lindsey's wife told him that his brother and her husband left together for the country. Burroughs' brother explained that he took William home to their mother, where he was guarded by other men. The jury found them guilty and they were sentenced to death.

=== Execution ===
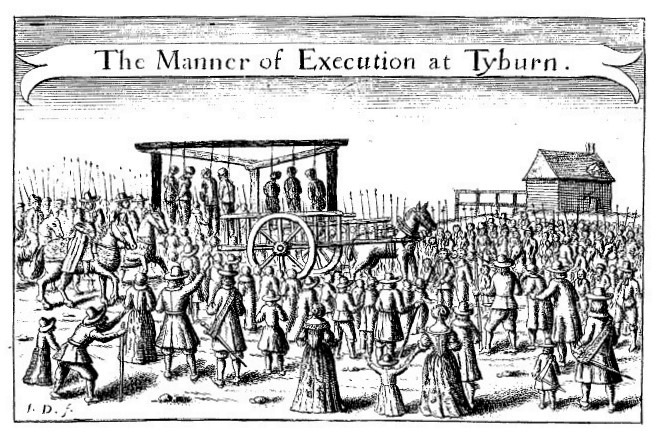
Executions at Tyburn (late seventeenth century)

Found guilty by the jury at his trials on 13 January 1721, Spiggot was sentenced to death along with his partner in crime Thomas Cross alias Phillips. The Ordinary of Newgate recorded that William Spiggot attended to the prayers before his execution thus being "truly penitent", contrary to his associate Cross who would disturb them. He also recalled that Spiggot did not easily weep, and when he wished his son farewell for the last time might have been the only moment that Purney saw Spiggot crying. The condemned man was furious at his former accomplice Joseph Lindsey, who had betrayed him by testifying at his trial. The convicted robber declared that he once had helped his former accomplice escape and that he had protected him and had saved his life.

Spiggot and Phillips were both executed on 11 February 1721 at Tyburn, with five other convicts. The crowd carried off Spiggot's body in order to prevent surgeons dissecting it. As suggested by Hitchcock and Shoemaker, it is probable that people were impressed by his bravery as he suffered the press ordeal and therefore protected his corpse.

== Interpretations of his Refusal to Plead ==
A refusal to plead led to such a harsh punishment, "a torture" according to Newgate's Ordinary, that people always wondered why Spiggot kept obstinate. The Chaplain already considered in his accounts of February 1721 the reasons of Spiggot's stubbornness. Thomas Purney affirmed that Spiggot's main motive was to secure his family so that they would not suffer from his trial, on a social and financial level. Then, Purney maintained that since Spiggot was angry at Lindsey, his ex-accomplice who testified against him during several trials, he would not want the person who betrayed him to be delighted by his downfall. However, the historians Shoemaker and Hitchcock, these two reasons were not convincing as a complete justification.

For them, the proof resides in the account opening sermon, where the Ordinate condemned misused virility and pride qualifying them of being "false courage". The two felons, Spiggot and Phillips bragged about their numerous extravagant crimes. The historian Andrea McKenzie suggests that obtaining a fame as highwayman could have been one of Spiggot's reason. The "criminal celebrities" were populars among the people, who would visit the famous criminals in prison or gather in huge crowds to watch an execution. Published works related the depravity of prisoners of the time, for instance Spiggot and his stubbornness were cited the Newgate Calendar or The Lives of the Most Remarkable Criminals.

The question of challenging justice in England is also raised. Even if Spiggot's intentions were not to challenge the legal system, it was interpreted by modern historians as confronting its authority. For instance, in her article about the Peine forte et dure, Andrea McKenzie argues that such refusals showed a "persistent popular resistance to that most sacred of English institutions, trial by jury". In an 18th-century trial, the balance was on the side of the prosecutor. Being judged by neighbours, with friends and relations testifying for and against them, prisoners had a few chances to be found innocent. Maybe knowing that his trial would certainly be his downfall considering the violence of his crimes, Spiggot refused to plead and to have a trial by a jury.

Furthermore, his reason could also be financial. As explained by McKenzie, the unsanitary London prisons were very expensive. To secure a private cell or better conditions, a prisoner had to pay for it. Requesting to be given back the money that was taken on his arrest, Spiggot probably wanted to secure better living conditions in Newgate.

== See also ==
=== Articles on Wikipedia ===
- Highwaymen and List of Highwaymen for more information and cases of famous thieves
- Newgate Prison for information on the old prison
- Old Bailey Courtroom
- Peine Forte et Dure, which explains the origins of the practice and recalls other cases in the world. For more information, readers might consider reading McKenzie's article in Law and History Review.
- Thief-taker for more information on the first kind of professional apprehenders of felons, see also the Bow Street Runners, the first official thief-takers office created in 1749
- Tyburn Executions

=== External links ===
- Old Bailey Proceedings Online, on online edition of the Proceedings that were published from 1674 to 1913 and recalls different trial cases. Also the website published the sister publication of the Proceedings, the Ordinary of Newgate's Accounts which collected stories and executions of condemned to death convicts. Explanations to the courtroom, policing system, and justice in England are also provided by its authors online.
- The British History Online is an online library that collected important documents on the history of Britain and Ireland from 1300 to 1800 which can be consulted for free.
- The Internet Archive, which is an American digital library, free of access. Some historical publications about Great Britain can be found online. It got copies of the Newgate Calendar and Lives of the Most Remarkable Criminals.

== Bibliography ==
=== Primary Sources ===
- "January 1721, trial of William Spigget alias Spiggot, Thomas Phillips alias Cross, William Heater (t17210113-43)". Old Bailey Proceedings Online (version 7.2, 31 October 2015)
- "January 1721, trial of William Spigget alias Spiggot, William Bourroughs (t17210113-44)". Old Bailey Proceedings Online (version 7.2, 31 October 2015)
- Lives of the Most Remarkable Criminals Who Have Been Condemned and Executed for Murder, Highway Robberies, House-Breaking, Street Robberies, Coining, or Other Offences; from the Year 1720 to the Year 1735, Collected from Original Papers and Authentic Memoirs, Volume I (1874), Reeves and Turner, London, UK (Available online on the Internet Archive)
- "Ordinary of Newgate's Account, February 1721 (OA17210208)". Old Bailey Proceedings Online (version 7.2, 12 November 2015)
- Pelham, Camden, Esq (1887). The chronicles of crime; or, The new Newgate calendar, being a series of memoirs and anecdotes of notorious characters who have outraged the laws of Great Britain from the earliest period to 1841. T. Miles & Co, London, UK. (Available online at the Internet Archive)
- "William and Mary, 1692: An Act for encourageing the apprehending of Highway Men [Chapter VIII Rot. Parl. pt. 3. nu. 3.]" in Statutes of the Realm: Volume 6, 1685-94. Ed. John Raithby (s.l. 1819). (Available online at the British History Online)

=== Secondary Sources ===
- Emsley, Clive; Hitchcock, Tim; Shoemaker, Robert. "Crime and Justice - Trial Procedures" Old Baileys Proceeding Online. Version 7.2. Retrieved 31 October 2015.
- Hitchcock, Tim; Shoemaker, Robert (2010). Tales from the Hanging Court. Bloomsbury Academic, London, UK.
- Hitchcock, Tim; Shoemaker, Robert; Emsley, Clive; Howard, Sharon; McLaughlin, Jamie (2012). The Old Bailey Proceedings Online, 1674-1913. Version 7.0. Retrieved 21 October 2015.
- Howson, Gerard (1985). Thief-Taker General, "Jonathan Wilde and the Emergence of Crime and Corruption as a Way of Life in Eighteenth-Century England". Transaction Books; New Brunswick, New Jersey, USA.
- McKenzie, Andrea. (2005). "This Death Some Strong and Stout Hearted Man Doth Choose": The Practice of Peine Forte et Dure in Seventeenth- and Eighteenth-Century England. Law and History Review, 23(2), 279–313. Retrieved from JSTOR 30042870 on 25 November 2015.
- McKenzie, Andrea (2007). Tyburn's Martyrs, Executions in england 1675-1775. Hambledon Continuum, Continuum Books; London, England.
