= The Iron Mistress =

1952 film by Gordon Douglas

- Directed by: Gordon Douglas
- Screenplay by: James R. Webb
- Based on: The Iron Mistress; 1951 novel by Paul Iselin Wellman
- Produced by: Henry Blanke
- Starring: Alan Ladd; Virginia Mayo
- Cinematography: John F. Seitz
- Edited by: Alan Crosland Jr.
- Music by: Max Steiner
- Color process: Technicolor
- Production company: Warner Bros. Pictures
- Distributed by: Warner Bros. Pictures
- Release date: November 19, 1952 (New York)
- Running time: 110 minutes
- Country: United States
- Language: English
- Box office: $2.9 million (U.S. rentals)

The Iron Mistress is a 1952 American Western film directed by Gordon Douglas and starring Alan Ladd, Virginia Mayo and Phyllis Kirk

The film was Ladd's first at Warner Bros. Pictures after spending a decade at Paramount Pictures.

== Plot ==
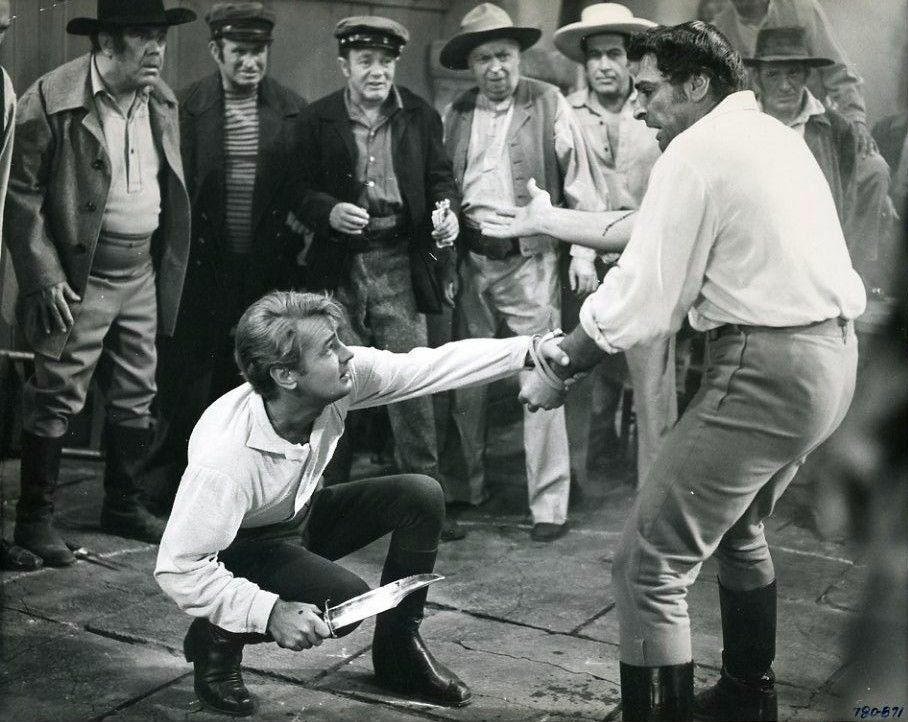
Studio publicity photograph with Alan Ladd and Anthony Caruso

In the early 19th century, Jim Bowie leaves his home in the Louisiana bayou to sell lumber in New Orleans. He inadvertently offends Narcisse de Bornay by defending the future famous artist James Audubon and is challenged to a duel, but he avoids having to fight and Narcisse becomes his friend.

Narcisse notices that his sister Judalon has caught Jim's eye and is concerned, knowing that she is haughty and spoiled. Henri Contrecourt, who has been courting her, kills Narcisse and challenges Jim to a fight. To the surprise of everyone, Jim kills Contrecourt with only his knife to defend him against a sword. When Judalon declines Jim's marriage proposal, he returns home and grows wealthy from the cotton business, upsetting Juan Moreno, a wealthy Mississippi cotton grower.

Jim enters a horse in a race for which there is heavy betting. At the race, Jim learns that Judalon has married wealthy Philippe de Cabanal, someone of her own elite social class. After Moreno's steed finishes second, he and other losing bettors seek to have Jim's horse disqualified, claiming that he does not own it. Jim produces a bill of sale but must to travel to Nashville to verify the signature of the previous owner. On the way, he asks a renowned blacksmith to create a knife for him. The blacksmith is intrigued by the challenge and employs the remains of a meteorite to strengthen the blade.

Jim learns that Judalon has been seeing Moreno. When the last of the losing bettors pays, he insults Jim's friend, causing a duel in which Jima and Moreno are opposing seconds. When the duel ends after the participants miss each other twice, Moreno shoots one man and stabs Jim with his sword, but Jim kills Moreno with his new knife. Judalon later tells Jim that she was cultivating Moreno because he had the political influence to obtain a bill of divorcement for her. She remains with Phillipe.

Jim is seriously wounded while traveling to Texas. He is nursed back to health by Ursula Veramendi, daughter of the governor of the Texas province of adjacent Mexico. When Jim returns to New Orleans to manage his affairs, he encounters Judalon and Phillippe aboard a luxurious steamboat. Phillippe has lost his money playing against card sharps. Jim exposes one of the cheaters and returns Philippe's money to him. Judalon tells Philippe that she is leaving him for Jim. Both Philippe and Bloody Jack Sturdevant come to kill Jim and unintentionally murder each other instead. When Judalon shows no regret over her husband's death, Jim abandons her, throws his knife into the river and marries Ursula.

== Cast ==
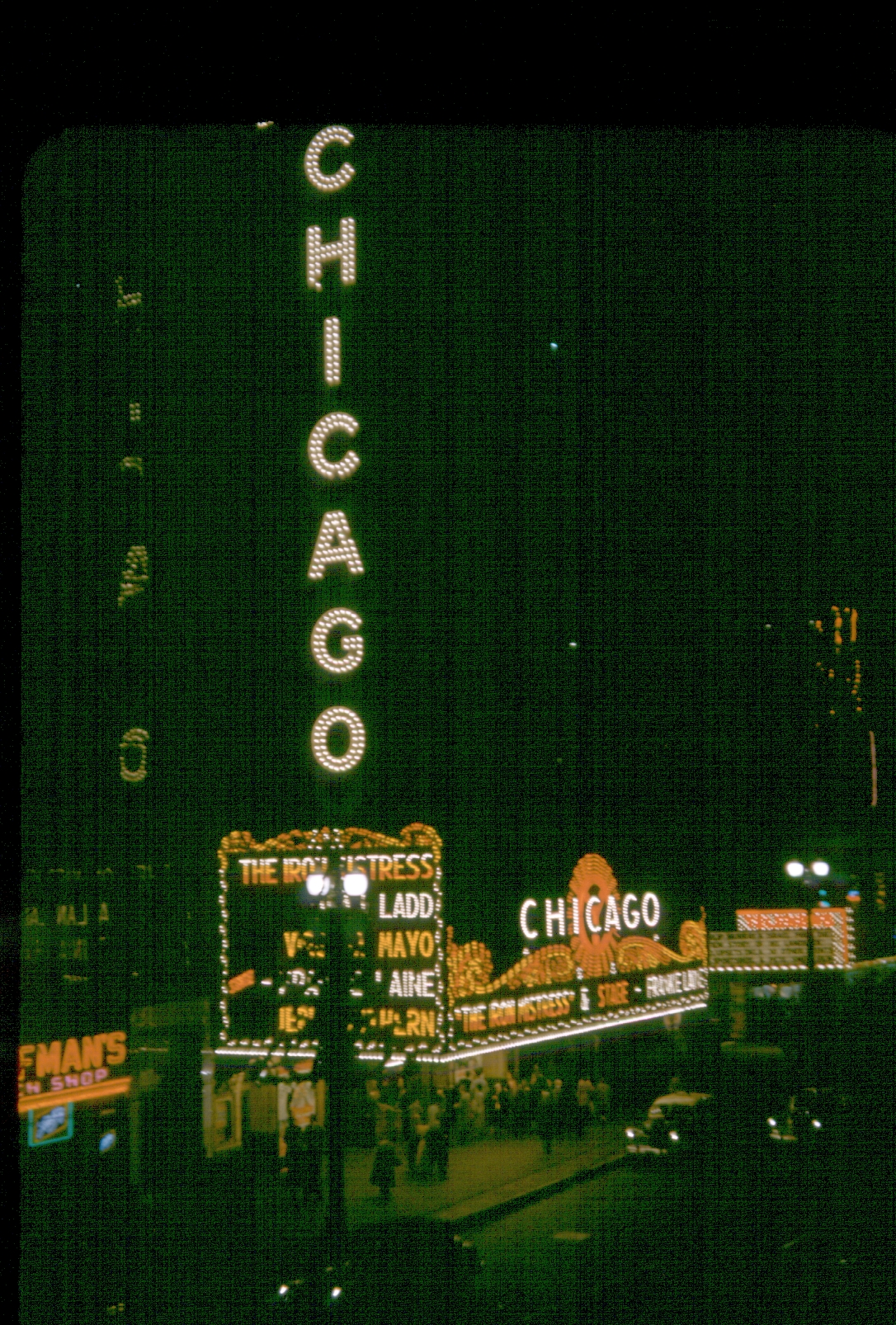
1952 photograph of the marquee of the Chicago Theatre advertising the film

- Alan Ladd as Jim Bowie
- Virginia Mayo as Judalon de Bornay
- Joseph Calleia as Juan Moreno
- Phyllis Kirk as Ursula Veramendi
- Alf Kjellin as Philippe de Cabanal
- Douglas Dick as Narcisse de Bornay
- Anthony Caruso as Bloody Jack Sturdevant
- Nedrick Young as Henri Contrecourt
- George Voskovec as John James Audubon
- Richard Carlyle as Rezin Bowie
- Robert Emhardt as Gen. Cuny
- Don Beddoe as Dr. Cuny
- Harold Gordon as Andrew Marschallk
- Gordon Nelson as Dr. Maddox
- Jay Novello as Judge Crain
- Nick Dennis as Nez Coupe
- Sarah Selby as Mrs. Bowie

== Production ==
Paul Wellman's bestselling novel The Iron Mistress was published in 1951. The Los Angeles Times called the book "a rattling good story" and The New York Times called it "an excellent quasi fictional biography from that skein of tangled legend and fact".

Warner Bros. bought the film rights to the novel and Errol Flynn was mentioned as a possible star. However, Alan Ladd, who had recently signed a contract with the studio, read a copy of the novel and wanted to appear in the film adaptation.

During filming, a fire swept through the Warner Bros. lot, but the unit for Iron Mistress was on location at the time.

Ladd injured his knee during the shoot and broke his hand on the last day of filming.

== Reception ==
In a contemporary review for The New York Times, critic Bosley Crowther highlighted the discrepancy between Bowie's characterization in Wellman's novel and that of the film:

According to most of these legends—and according, in fact, to the book about Bowie by Paul I. Wellman, upon which this picture is supposedly based—the fellow was something of a rascal around New Orleans in the days of Jean Lafitte and only achieved heroic stature by fighting in the Texas revolution and dying in the Alamo. But in this lushly romantic movie which Warner Brothers has produced in an outburst of frills and Technicolor that matches the gaudiness of the yarn, the early career of Bowie is thoroughly fabled and carpentered into a biography of the sort of hero who is most conveniently played by Alan Ladd. And since "The Iron Mistress" just happens to be the first picture for Warners from Mr. Ladd, it may reasonably be suspected that it was tailored and dressed up for him. More, one might say, is the pity, for a hard-grained and candid film about a credibly impious adventurer might be a pretty good thing, while this plush and idealized excursion in romantic bombast makes a straight conventional show. Except for a couple of really vicious and ugly enactments of knife duels (which should be meat for the juvenile delinquents), it is hackneyed, hollow and tame.

== See also ==
- List of American films of 1952
- The Sturdivant Gang, led by Roswell "Bloody Jack" Sturdivant
