= Isaac Darkin =

Isaac Darkin (also rendered as Darking; 2 April 1740 – 23 March 1761), who also used the alias Dumas, was a notorious highwayman in the eighteenth century.

== Early life and start of life of crime ==
Darkin was born on 2 April 1740, the son of a cork-cutter. He was born in the Eastcheap district of London, and according to the London Chronicle, attended a boarding school in Kent. After the death of his father in 1754, Darkin, along with his sister, took over the running of the family business. Within a few years they had closed down the business and this is when Darkin was drawn to a life of crime. Operating successfully as a highwayman in the Essex area, his robberies over a nine-month period helped support an extravagant lifestyle, reputedly with many mistresses.

== First trial, exile and escape from Antigua ==
He was eventually apprehended and put on trial for robbing a Captain Cockburn, Darkin was tried at the Chelmsford Assizes in February 1758. He pleaded guilty to one of the eight charges laid against him. Although given a capital sentence on account of his youth the judge granted a reprieve and sentenced him to fourteen years of transportation. However, due to his role in uncovering a plot by prisoners to kill the prison keeper and escape, and the intercession of the grateful keeper, Darkin was given a pardon on the condition he joined the 48th Regiment of Foot, a regiment of the British Army, then stationed at Antigua. He sailed to Antigua in January 1759. Service life did not suit Darkin and he was court-martialled three times within seven weeks before being appointed to the undemanding role of servant to an officer.

Darkin was not in the army long before he persuaded a captain of a merchant navy ship, with the promise of a reward, to smuggle him back to England, an offence that carried a fine of £100 at that time.

== Return to England, career in the Navy and resumption of life of crime ==
Certain Belles to Dumas

Joy to thee, lovely thief! that thou
Hast 'scaped the fatal string;
Let gallows groan with ugly rogues
Dumas must never swing.

Dost theek money? to thy wants
Our purses we'll resign;
Could we our hearts to guineas coin,
Those guineas all were thine

To Bath in safety let my lord
His loaded pockets carry;
Thou ne'er again shall tempt the road
Sweet youth! if thou wilt marry.

No more shall niggard travellers
Avoid thee; – we'll insure 'em
To us thou shalt consign thy balls
And pistols; we'll secure 'em

Yet think not when the chains are off
Which now thy legs bedeck,
To fly; in fetters softer far
We'll chain thee by the neck.

— Anonymous, reported in The Annual Register

On his return, where he arrived at Portsmouth, he left immediately for London, telling the ship's captain that he was going to raise the promised reward from friends. Darkin swiftly resumed his career as a highwayman in the west and midlands of England, deliberately avoiding Essex and using the aliases Harris and Hamilton. According to the London Chronicle, Darkin spent the proceeds of his crimes on "lewd women". Thinking his growing notoriety would lead to his capture, he sought safety from the law by joining the Royal Navy. He served aboard the Royal George, where he was soon promoted to Midshipman. His naval service did not interfere unduly with his criminal career as he availed of a leave of absence during which he returned to his former activities in the vicinity of Bath.

This spree culminated notably in the robbery of around 13 guineas and a pistol from Lord Percival, the son of the Earl of Egmont who was travelling to Bath; the attack took place on 22 June 1760 near Devizes. The Annual Register gave the following account of the encounter. On approaching Percival's post chaise, Darkin, wearing a crape to hide his face, produced a gun and Percival handed over a sum of money of about 13 guineas – he was unsure of the exact amount. Darkin believed that he carried more money and demanded that Percival's purse be produced with the threat of "blowing his brains out". Percival managed to disarm the highwayman, but in the ensuing pursuit, Darkin produced another pistol. Percival attempted to shoot at him, but his gun misfired. Darkin approached Percival again with demands for his purse, but on Percival's assurances that he had no more money to hand, the highwayman accepted the word of Percival and retreated from the scene, only asking that Percival would not appear as a witness against him in any subsequent court case.

Evading an attempt to capture him several hours later, which included a four-hour pursuit and a fall from his horse, an exhausted Darkin asked a local farmer near the village of Upavon for a bed for the night. The farmer directed him to a local public-house, where later in the night, the highwayman was captured by a group of locals. This group included the farmer who had at the time of their meeting recognised him from the reports of the robbery.

Darkin was put on trial again, this time at the Assizes in Salisbury. Although a sum of money equal to that stolen in the robbery was found on his person, as well as a pistol similar to that stolen from Percival, Darkin claimed to be an unwitting victim of circumstance. His testimony in his defence asserted his name was Dumas; that he was a native of the West Indies who, unfamiliar with the locality, had lost his way and sought refuge in a local village. The pistol found on him was explained as one of a pair he had purchased. He claimed that he had lost the other pistol on the road and suggested that the real highwayman had found the pistol and used it in the commission of the crime. The crape he explained away as a neckerchief and a souvenir of his time in military service, during which he participated in the invasion of Guadeloupe. Neither Percival or his driver could identify Darkin as their assailant with certainty and he was found not guilty. After his acquittal, he successfully petitioned the court for the return of his possessions, including the money.

During his incarceration awaiting trial, Darkin was the subject of much attention from the ladies of the upper classes of Salisbury, with many visiting the gaol. It was suggested that had he wished, he could have married a woman of means and left his profession in safety; the attention he garnered lead a wag to compose a song called "Certain Belles to Dumas", which was later republished in Edmund Burke's Annual Register.

== Return to London, his capture and journey to the gallows ==
On his release, Darkin hastily made his way to London, and again returned to being a highwayman. In the following weeks, he continued his robberies, at first near London, and later fearing detection, further from the capital. A description of one encounter recounts that when he held up a coach of ladies, he declined the opportunity to rob the occupants, but decided in lieu of booty to dance a couranto with each of the women.

In August 1760, he committed yet another robbery which was to be his last. He deprived a Smithfield apothecary by the name of Robert Gammon of a gold watch, one Guinea and five Shillings on a highway near the Oxfordshire village of Nettlebed. Later on the day of the crime, the highwayman made his way to a local inn, where he left two letters with the innkeeper, to be despatched to London in the next post. Unfortunately for him, his victim Gammon had visited the same inn two hours previously and had given an account of the crime to the innkeeper, who recognised Darking from the description given by Gammon. The letters were sent to Gammon in London, who forwarded them to Sir John Fielding and the Bow Street Runners. Darkin was captured a few days later, while in bed at his London lodgings in the company of "a woman of the town"; his attempt at escape failed and he was brought to Newgate Prison.

Darkin was transferred to Oxford, where he was incarcerated in Oxford Castle awaiting his trial, which took place on 6 March 1761. Darkin made an attempt to put off the trial by producing an affidavit saying a witness that would prove his innocence was ill and unable to attend the trial, but this was dismissed by the court as it wasn't signed by a magistrate. Faced with overwhelming evidence, the jury took only a few minutes to reach a guilty verdict. An appeal for clemency was rejected by the judge and Darkin was sentenced to death by hanging. The trial lasted less than one day; James Woodforde the clergyman, who was a student at Oxford at the time, attended the Assizes that day and recorded in his diary that over the course of four hours one man (Darkin) was sentenced to death, seven were sentenced to transportation and one was sentenced to be burnt on the hand and then released. (Woodforde was among the many who visited Darkin in his gaol cell.)

While in prison awaiting his fate, he was reported to have drunk freely and entertained himself (and others) by reading from The Beggar's Opera, identifying with the character of Macheath. It was noted that he gave much attention to his attire and as the London Chronicle reported, had "his hair dressed in the most fashionable manner every morning". On the day of his execution, 23 March 1761, he placed the noose over his head and, without waiting for the assistance of the hangman, stepped off the ladder.

Before his death, Darkin had expressed a fear that his body would be taken for dissection by medical students. It was reported by Gentleman's Magazine that just after his execution, the gallows was surrounded by a group of local bargemen, who took the body to a nearby church where, according to the report, "while some rang the bell, others opened the belly, filled it with quicklime, and then buried the body."
