= Peine forte et dure =

Legal method of coercion, using torture

Peine forte et dure (Law French for "hard and forceful punishment") was a method of torture formerly used in the common law legal system, in which a defendant who refused to plead ("stood mute") would be subjected to having heavier and heavier stones placed upon their chest until a plea was entered, or death resulted.

Many defendants charged with capital offences would refuse to plead in order to avoid forfeiture of property. If the defendant pleaded either guilty or not guilty and was executed, their heirs would inherit nothing, their property escheating to the state. If they refused to plead their heirs would inherit their estate, even if they died in the process.

== Legal background ==
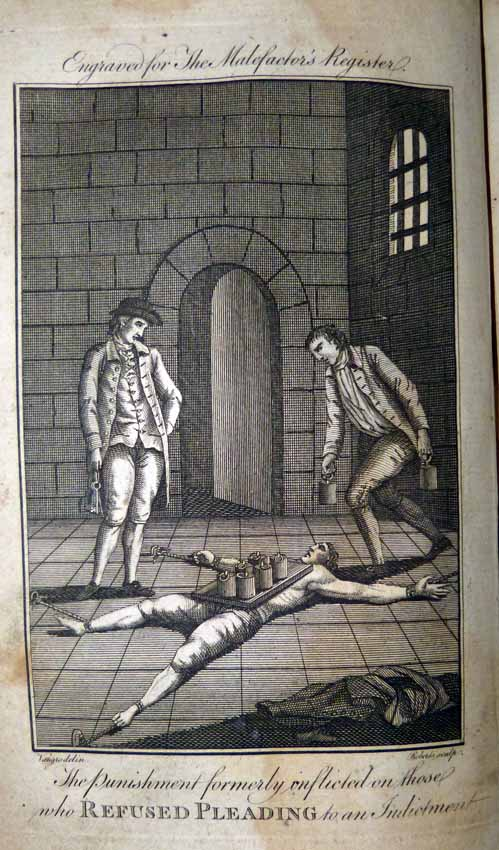
An engraving of the peine forte et dure inflicted on a prisoner (appearing in the "Malefactor's register" of 1780)

At the beginning of the thirteenth century, criminal cases in England could be tried either by ordeal or by judicial combat. Priests were involved in trials by ordeal, e.g. in heating the iron which the accused had to hold (and possibly letting it cool before the accused had to seize it). In 1215 the Fourth Lateran Council forbade clergy from participating in ordeals. The problem which this created for the legal system was solved by allowing the accused to submit to trial by jury as an alternative to trial by battle (which was not available for women or those accused by the community). But as trial by combat remained a (theoretical) option, the accused could not be forced into a jury trial; he had to submit to it voluntarily by entering a plea seeking judgment from the court; otherwise he was remanded back to prison.

Obviously, a criminal justice system that could punish only those who had volunteered for possible punishment was unworkable; a means was needed to coerce them into entering a plea. Alternatively, individuals were frequently tried under Admiralty law, as observed by Henry de Bracton.

The "Standing Mute Act 1275" (3 Edw. 1 c. 12; unofficial short title derived from its subject matter as listed by the Chronological Table of the Statutes), part of the 1275 Statute of Westminster passed by Edward I, sought to resolve this problem:

It is provided also, That notorious Felons, which openly be of evil name, and will not put themselves in Enquests of Felonies that Men shall charge them with before the Justices at the King's suit, shall have strong and hard Imprisonment (prison forte et dure), as they which refuse to stand to the common Law of the Land: But this is not to be understood of such prisoners as be taken of light suspicion.

The words of the statute – prison forte et dure – meant a harsh regime and a meagre diet:

in the worst place in the prison, upon the bare ground continually, night and day; that they eat only bread made of barley or bran, and that they drink not the day they eat ...

By the 1300s the words of the statute had been corrupted to peine forte et dure. This took the form of "pressing" the accused with weights. The procedure was recorded by a 15th-century witness as follows:

he will lie upon his back, with his head covered and his feet, and one arm will be drawn to one quarter of the house with a cord, and the other arm to another quarter, and in the same manner it will be done with his legs; and let there be laid upon his body iron and stone, as much as he can bear, or more ...

"Pressing to death" might take several days, and not necessarily with a continued increase in the load. The Frenchman Guy Miege, who from 1668 taught languages in London, wrote the following about the English practice:

For such as stand Mute at their Trial, and refuse to answer Guilty, or Not Guilty, Pressing to Death is the proper Punishment. In such a Case the Prisoner is laid in a low dark Room in the Prison, all naked but his Privy Members, his Back upon the bare Ground his Arms and Legs stretched with Cords, and fastned to the several Quarters of the Room. This done, he has a great Weight of Iron and Stone laid upon him. His Diet, till he dies, is of three Morsels of Barley bread without Drink the next Day; and if he lives beyond it, he has nothing daily, but as much foul Water as he can drink three several Time, and that without any Bread: Which grievous Death some resolute Offenders have chosen, to save their Estates to their Children. But, in case of High Treason, the Criminal's Estate is forfeited to the Sovereign, as in all capital Crimes, notwithstanding his being pressed to Death.

Peine forte et dure was abolished in the Kingdom of Great Britain in 1772 by the Felony and Piracy Act 1772, with the last known actual use of the practice having been in 1741. From 1772 refusing to plead was deemed to be equivalent to pleading guilty, but this was changed in 1827 by the Criminal Law Act 1827 to being deemed a plea of not guilty – which is now the case in all common law jurisdictions.

== Cases ==
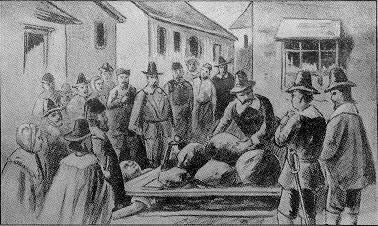
Giles Corey was pressed to death during the Salem Witch Trials in the 1690s.

The most infamous case in England was that of Roman Catholic martyr St Margaret Clitherow, who (in order to avoid a trial in which her own children would be obliged to give evidence and could be tortured) was pressed to death on 25 March 1586, after refusing to plead to the charge of having harboured Catholic priests in her house. She died together with her unborn child within fifteen minutes under a weight of at least 7 long hundredweight (780 lb; 360 kg). Several hardened criminals yielded to the torture: William Spiggot (1721) remained mute for about half an hour under 350 lb (160 kg), but pleaded to the indictment when an extra 50 lb (23 kg) were added; Edward Burnworth (1726) pleaded after an hour and three minutes at 422 lb (191 kg). Others, such as Major Strangways (1658) and John Weekes (1731), refused to plead, even under 400 lb (180 kg), and were killed when bystanders, out of mercy, sat on them.

In America, Giles Corey was pressed to death between 17 and 19 September 1692, during the Salem witch trials, after he refused to enter a plea in the judicial proceeding. According to legend, his last words as he was being crushed were "More weight", and he was thought to have been killed as the weight was applied. This is referred to in Arthur Miller's political drama The Crucible, where Giles Corey is pressed to death after refusing to plead "aye or nay" to the charge of witchcraft. In the film version of this play, the screenplay of which was also by Miller, Corey is crushed to death for refusing to reveal the name of a source of information.

== See also ==
- Asphyxia
- Crush syndrome
- Crushing (execution)
