= James Ford (pirate) =

American river pirate (1775–1833)

- No known portrait of James Ford exists from life. This is an artist's likeness created from his physical description in historical records.
- Born: James N. Ford; October 22, 1775; Ninety-Six District, Province of South Carolina, British America, present-day Spartanburg, South Carolina
- Died: July 7, 1833 (aged 57); Ford's Ferry, Livingston County, Kentucky, near present-day Tolu, Kentucky
- Cause of death: Gunshot wound
- Resting place: Ford family cemetery, Kirksville, Livingston County, Kentucky
- Other names: Squire Ford, Satan's Ferryman
- Known for: Being a pillar of the community and secretly, the criminal leader of the Ford's Ferry Gang, along the Ohio River
- Spouse(s): Susan Miles (first wife); Elizabeth "Betsy" W. Armstead Frazier (second wife)
- Children: 4

James Ford, born James N. Ford, also known as James N. Ford Sr., the "N" possibly for Neal (October 22, 1775 – July 7, 1833), was an American civic leader and business owner in western Kentucky and southern Illinois, from the late 1790s to the mid-1830s. Despite his clean public image as a "Pillar of the Community", Ford was secretly a river pirate and the leader of a gang that was later known as the "Ford's Ferry Gang". His men were the river equivalent of highway robbers. They hijacked flatboats and Ford's "own river ferry" for tradable goods from local farms that were coming down the Ohio River.

Ford was an Illinois associate of Isaiah L. Potts and the Potts Hill Gang, highway robbers, of the infamous Potts Inn. James Ford also was an associate of John Hart Crenshaw, an illegal slave trader and a kidnapper of free African Americans, and may have taken part in the Illinois version of the Reverse Underground Railroad. At one point, the outlaws used "Cave-in-Rock" as their headquarters on the Illinois side of the lower Ohio River, approximately 85 miles downriver from Evansville, Indiana.

== Early life and family history ==
James Ford was born in the Ninety-Six District, Province of South Carolina of the Thirteen Colonies, now present-day Spartanburg, Spartanburg County, South Carolina a son of Philip and Elizabeth Ford and a grandson of John Ford. He had two brothers, Philip Jr. and Richard. His father died while Ford was still young, and his mother then married William Prince, who brought the family to what would become Princeton in Caldwell County, Kentucky. This marriage provided James with a number of step- and half-siblings, who provided important contacts for his future political, business, and criminal careers.

== Marriages and children ==
In the late 1790s, James Ford married Susan Miles, a daughter of William Miles, who was a brother of the ferry keeper at Miles Ferry, between the Kentucky and Illinois banks of the Ohio below Cave-in-Rock, near the location of present-day Rosiclare, Illinois. Susan Ford provided her husband with two sons, Philip (November 25, 1800 - November 23, 1831) and William M. (1804 – November 2, 1832), as well as a daughter, Cassandra (1805/1806–1863).

Susan died in the 1820s, and in 1829, Ford married Elizabeth "Betsy" W. Armstead Frazier (1790–1800 – 1834–1835), a widow whose husband had died suddenly while staying at Ford's plantation, in then Livingston County, Kentucky (now Crittenden County, Kentucky). Elizabeth Ford had one more son, James N. Ford Jr., (c. 1830 – October 1844).

== Criminal activities ==
James Ford had settled on the Kentucky side of the Ohio River by the late 1790s, during the time that Samuel Mason's river pirates operated out of Cave-in-Rock. Early writers identified him with the "James Wilson" who operated a tavern and brothel in the cave in the spring of 1799, but these are now believed to be incorrect, since historical records show that a man named James Wilson lived in the area at the same time as Ford.

== Criminal associates ==
- John Harmon
- Alonzo Pennington and Pennington Gang (successors to the Ford's Ferry Gang, after Ford's assassination and his distant relatives)
- Isaiah L. Potts or legendary Billy Potts Sr. of Potts Inn
- Sturdivant Gang of counterfeiters.

== Notable Ford's Ferry Gang members ==
- James Ford
- Philip Ford
- William M. Ford
- Francis Prince (possible gang member)
- Henry C. Shouse
- Nathaniel Simpson (possible gang member)

== Military service ==
The military experience of James Ford was limited to commanding frontier Kentucky and Illinois territorial militia units. Even without any combat experience, serving as a militia officer helped Ford acquire local prestige and created opportunities for him in the political and business affairs of the Ohio River valley of Kentucky and Illinois.

Ford was captain of the Livingston County cavalry company in the 24th Kentucky Militia Regiment between July 1, 1799, and December 15, 1802.

While living in Illinois Territory, on January 2, 1810, James Ford became captain of the Grand Pierre area militia company of the 4th Regiment of Illinois Territory Militia, was one of three territorial militia companies in southeastern Illinois. (The other companies based around the frontier settlements of Elizabethtown and Cave-In-Rock were simply local volunteer frontier military units.) The Grand Pierre Company comprised men from Grand Pierre, a frontier settlement in the area located near the Grand Pierre Creek Watershed, now Rosiclare, Illinois. Grand Pierre was one of three frontier Illinois militia districts in what later became Hardin County, Illinois. The fort used by the Grand Pierre militia company may have been the blockhouse formerly located north of the present-day water tower that was used later by the Sturdivant Gang for counterfeiting in the late 1810s and early 1820s. During the occupation of the fort by the counterfeiters, James Ford held the deed to the land, giving him legal ownership of the fort and making him guilty by association for allowing counterfeiting to take place.

Ford was also the captain of a company of the Illinois Territorial Militia from July 15, 1811, to August 8, 1811. Ford was later promoted to major, being one of two such military ranks available in the 4th Regiment of Militia in the Illinois Territory on November 28, 1811.

James Steele Sr. also spelled Steel, who had been a private in Ford's Company, succeeded him as captain of the Grand Pierre militia. In the War of 1812, Steele served as a private in Captain John Cochran's company of the 1st Regiment of Illinois (Territorial) Militia, under the command of Captain Absolem Cox, at Kaskaskia on September 3, 1812. The residency of James Steele was recorded in the first Illinois State Census in 1818 and the 1820 U.S. Census as living in Pope County, Illinois, now present-day Hardin County, Illinois. At the time the state and federal censuses were conducted, Steele was a criminal member of the Sturdivant Gang of counterfeiters which operated in the Rosiclare area of Hardin County from the 1810s to 1820s.

== Property holdings ==
James Ford was a substantial land owner, who owned a 500-acre plantation at his home in Tolu, Kentucky, as well as holding numerous other properties on the Kentucky and Illinois sides of the Ohio River. Through his first wife's family, he secured the rights to the Miles Ferry, which soon became known as Ford's Ferry, though this is not the infamous one he operated later, upriver from Cave-in-Rock, called Ferry Ohio. Through his second marriage, he secured control of the Frazier Salt Works, at the Lower Lick Great Salt Springs, in the Illinois Salines in Gallatin County, Illinois, during the late 1820s.

== Slave-holding ==
James Ford owned a considerable number of slaves in Kentucky. He leased out his slaves for saltmaking operations under a contract with the U.S. government at the U.S. Saline, near Equality, Illinois. The influence of James Ford was felt as far away as Springfield, Illinois, which can be attested to in the Sangamo Journal newspaper, where he ran a fugitive slave notice, with detailed physical descriptions of two runaway slaves he owned. The cruel and ruthless treatment Ford showed toward his slaves was told in numerous stories. In one tale, Ford was alleged to have punished one of his slaves by using a vise to secure the head of the slave and cut off his ears and pull out his teeth. The 1832 runaway slave notice Ford had printed in the Sangamo Journal indicated that a slave named "Ben" had his ears removed for "robbing a boat on the Ohio River". In another tale, James Ford allegedly bound hand to foot an offending slave and dragged him to death behind a mule, through a field of tree stumps.

== Allegations of illegal slave trading ==
James Ford was also alleged to have had legitimate and criminal associations with John Hart Crenshaw, an Illinois businessman operating the Illinois Salines and who kidnapped free Blacks to sell into the illegal slave trade, as well as practicing illegal slave breeding. The road from the Old Slave House of Crenshaw in Illinois crossing the Ohio River to Ford's Ferry, Kentucky, was a heavily traveled route of the infamous Reverse Underground Railroad, which sent its victims to a life of enslavement in the Southern United States.

== Physical appearance ==
Dr. Charles H. Webb, future husband of Ford's daughter Cassandra, described the appearance of James Ford while he was at his plantation in 1822:

He was of about six feet in height, and of powerful build, a perfect Hercules in point of strength; but he has now grown to corpulent to undergo much fatigue. His head is large and well shaped; his sandy brown hair, now thin, is turning gray, for he must be fully fifty years old; his eyes, of a steel-gray color, are brilliant and his glance quick and penetrating; his nose rather short and thick; his upper lip remarkably long, his mouth large, and his lips full and sensuous. He has a broad firm double chin, and his voice is deep and sonorous. His complexion is very florid, and he converses fluently. On the whole, when in repose, he gives one the idea of a good natured, rather than a surly, bulldog; but, if aroused, I should say he would be a lion tamer.

== Death ==
James Ford was ambushed and shot dead at Ford's Ferry near his home on July 7, 1833, by members of his own criminal gang. He was buried in the Ford family cemetery in Kirksville, Kentucky, on the grounds of the Ford family plantation property, now located on Tolu-Carrsville Road (Kentucky Route 135 - KY 135), in present-day Tolu, Crittenden County, Kentucky, on a farm that was owned by the Brazwell family in the 1980s.

== Ford's Ferry after James Ford ==
Following the death of James Ford in 1833, Ford's Ferry continued on as an important Ohio River ferry crossing with a high-water road that could be used even when the river flooded. The small town built around Ford's Ferry came to be spelled Fords Ferry and continued to prosper. According to the 19th-century Collins' Historical Sketches of Kentucky, Fords Ferry had four stores and two hotels, with a population of about 75 people. Eventually, the Ohio River ferry at Cave-In-Rock became the last one in the area, bypassing the road traffic at Ford's Ferry, which caused it to cease operations and be abandoned along with the town.

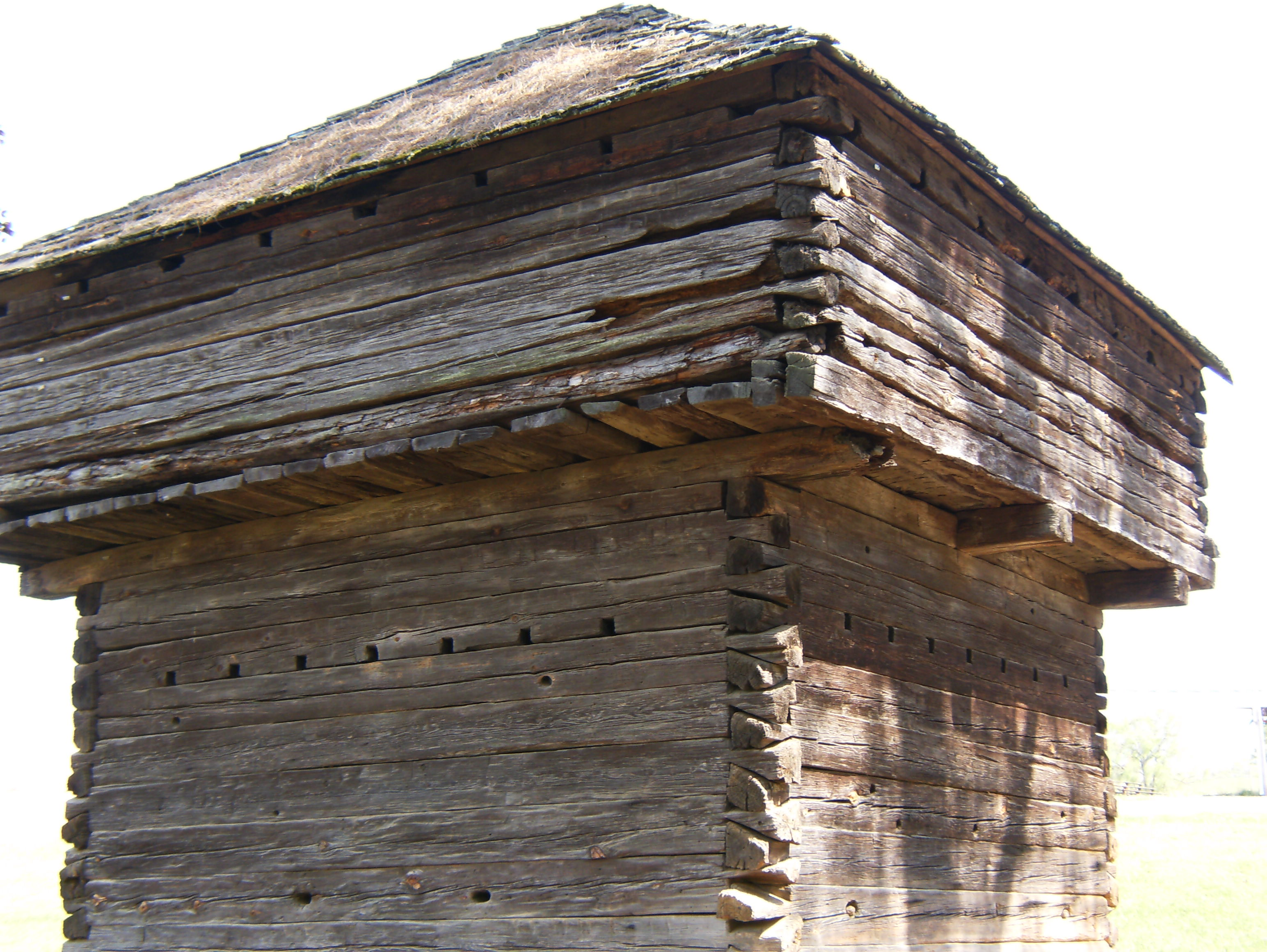
A blockhouse fort similar to the one used by Captain James Ford when he was in command of the Grand Pierre area militia, 4th Regiment of Illinois Territorial Militia, January 2, 1810, which may have used later by the Sturdivant Gang in 1820s-1830s for their counterfeiting operation overlooking the bluff of the Ohio River at Rosiclare, Illinois

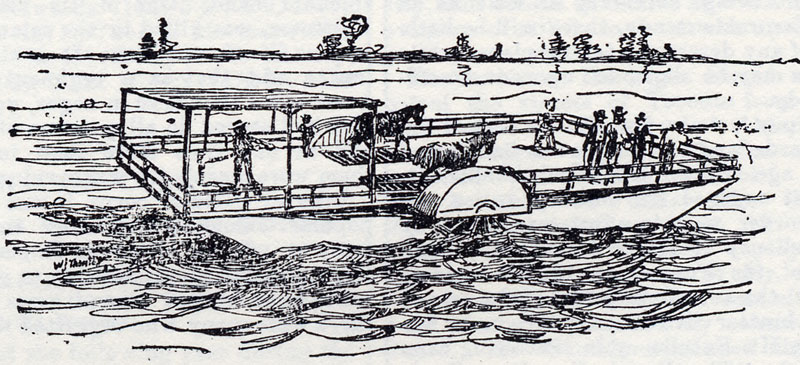
This is an early 19th-century horse-powered ferry boat of the kind used by James Ford, the prominent Kentucky civic leader who secretly was an outlaw on a ferry he operated across the Ohio River of western Kentucky to southern Illinois in the late 1790s to mid-1830s.

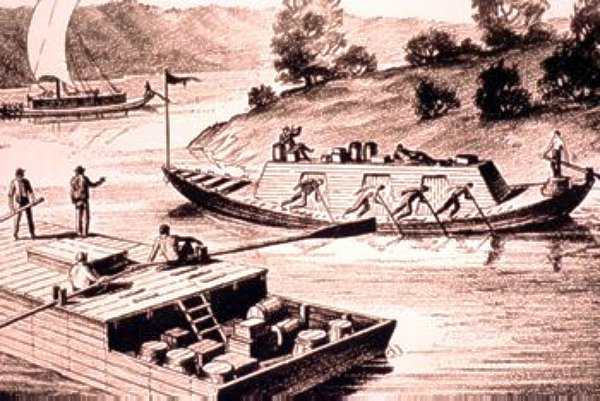
Along the Ohio River, James Ford and his gang of outlaws, chose flatboats, keelboats, and rafts, as profitable targets, to attack, because of the valuable and plentiful cargo on board.

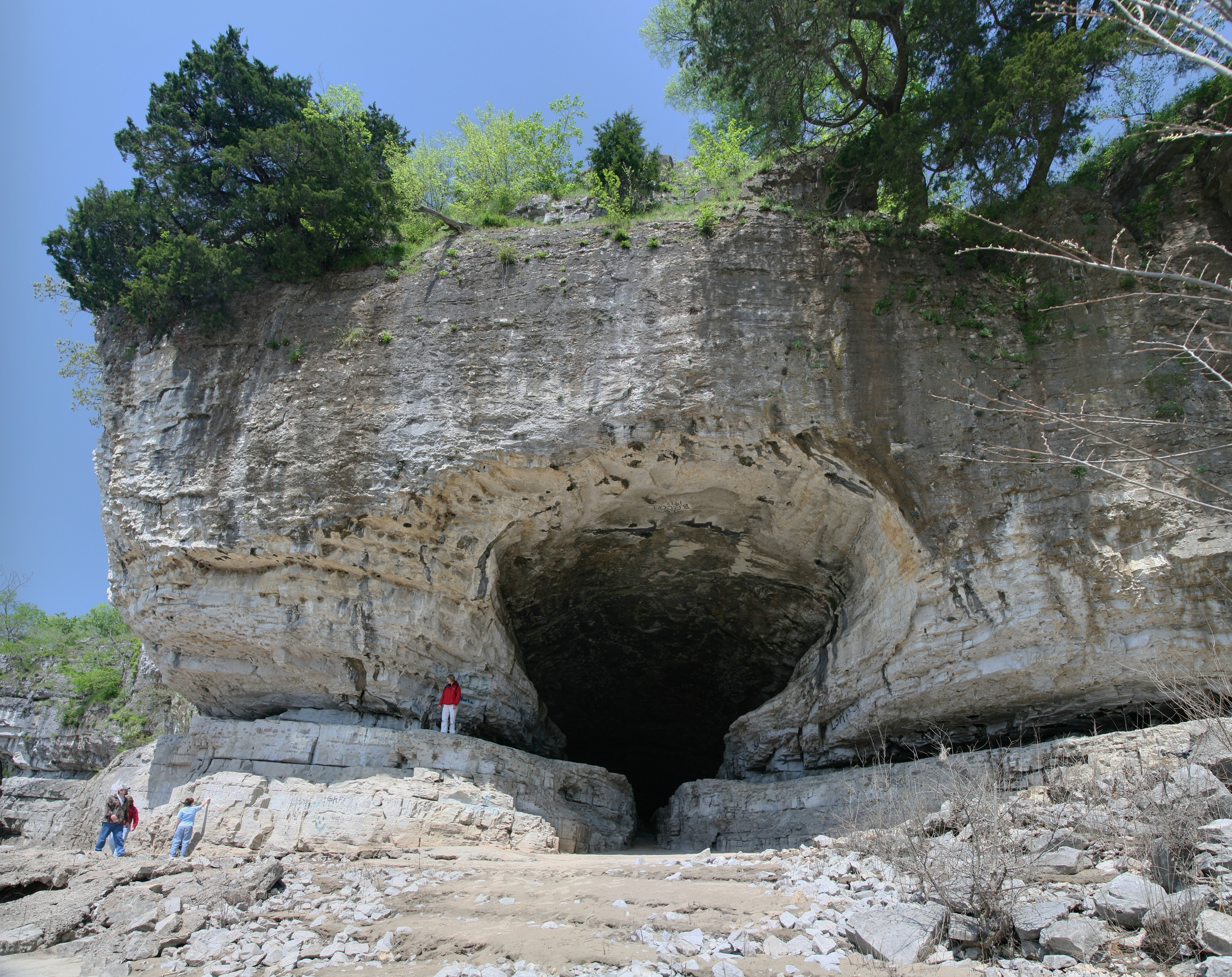
Cave-In-Rock on the Illinois side of the Ohio River, where James Ford and his gang would meet to run their criminal operations in the region

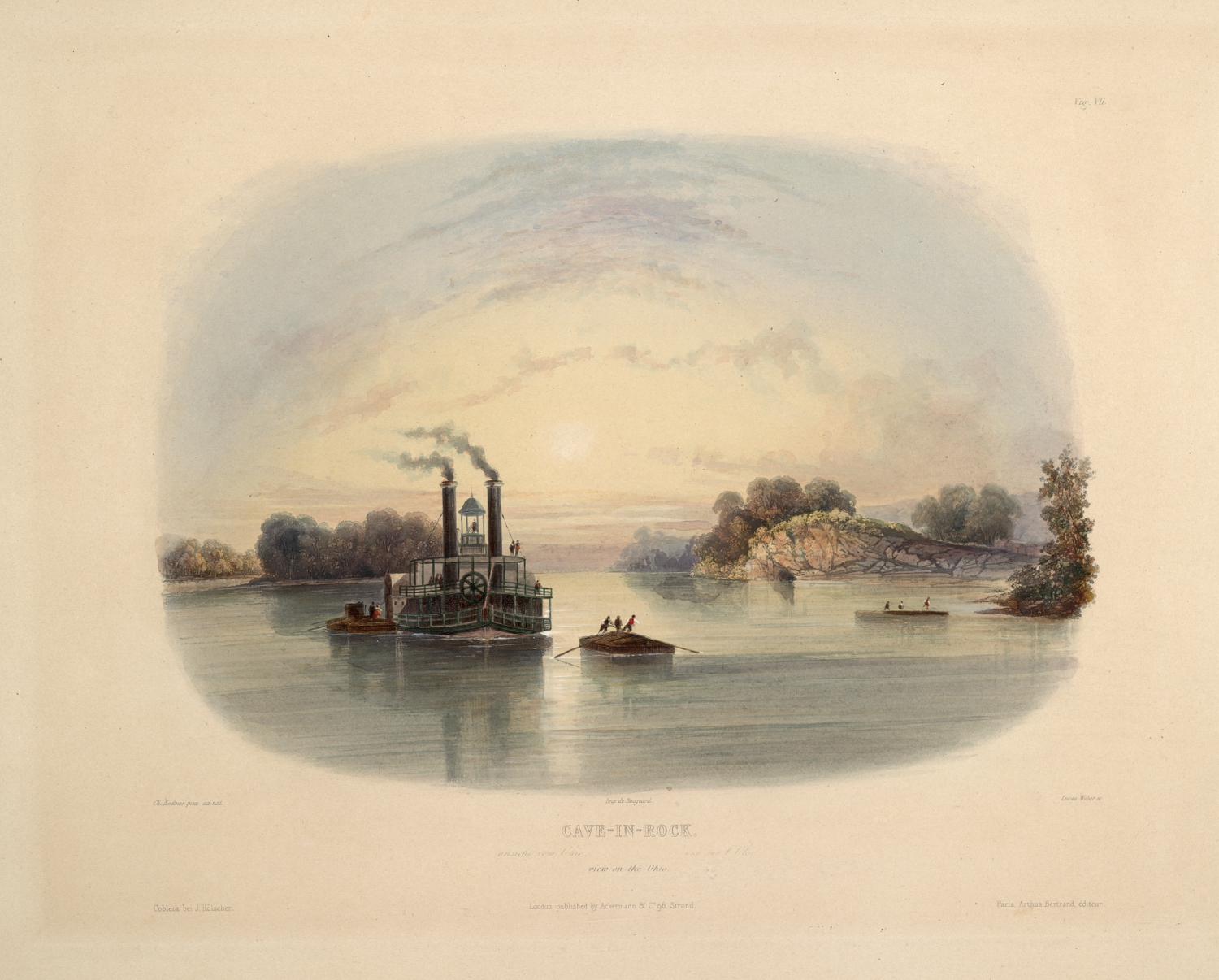
A view of the Ohio River, near Cave-In-Rock, Illinois in 1832, a year before James Ford was murdered at his slave plantation home across the river in Tolu, Kentucky, now Crittenden County

James Ford ran a runaway-slaves notice advertisement originally written on July 12, 1832, and appearing in the Sangamo Journal of Springfield, Illinois, in a free state on August 2, 1832, the year before he was murdered.

== See also ==
- Peter Alston
- Samuel Mason
- John Murrell
- Isaiah L. Potts
- Stack Island (Mississippi River)
- Sturdivant Gang
- Tower Rock
