= Isaiah L. Potts =

- Born: Isaiah Luna Potts; 1784? Loudoun County, Virginia
- Died: after 1843 (aged 59+)
- Other names: Isaiah Luna Potts, William Potts, Billy Potts, Billy Potts Sr.
- Occupations: tavern keeper, justice of the peace, road supervisor, salt maker, criminal gang leader, highwayman
- Spouse: Polly Blue
- Parent(s): David Potts and Elizabeth Luna Looney

Potts Hill Gang
- Founded by: Dr. King, Nysonger, and possibly Isaiah L. Potts, alias Billy Potts Sr.
- Founding location: Potts Tavern, near Potts Hill, Pope County, Illinois, now an abandoned house, west of, present-day Illinois Route 1 (state highway) in Hardin County, Illinois
- Years active: 1820s-1830s
- Territory: Illinois, Ohio River
- Ethnicity: European-American
- Membership (est.): ?
- Criminal activities: river piracy, slave stealing, horse and cattle theft, highway robbery, counterfeiting, murder

Isaiah Luna Potts (1784?-after 1843) was infamous in legend and lore for having run a 19th-century Illinois tavern known as "Potts Inn" where numerous crimes including robbery and murder were committed.

== Early life ==
Isaiah Luna Potts was born in Loudoun County, Virginia, and lived in Union County, Kentucky and Potts Hill, in Hardin County, Illinois, which was formerly a part of Pope County, Illinois.

== In legend and folklore ==
In legend and folklore, he was known by many names and aliases including "Billy Potts, Sr." Potts was an Illinois tavern keeper and salt maker who, allegedly, co-led a gang of highwaymen and murderers, known as the "Potts Hill Gang", out of his tavern. They preyed along the frontier crossroad highways, and the Ford's Ferry Road, near Cave-In-Rock. Isaiah Potts was also alleged to be the criminal partner of James Ford, a pillar of the local community, and secretly, the criminal leader of the Ford's Ferry Gang.

== Notable Potts Hill Gang members ==
- Dr. King (first name unknown)
- Nysonger (first name unknown)
- Billy Potts Sr. (possible gang member)
- Billy Potts Jr. (possible gang member)
