= Hicks, Illinois =

- Unincorporated community
- Location within Illinois Location within the United States
- Coordinates: 37°32′35″N 88°22′32″W
- Country: United States
- State: Illinois
- County: Hardin
- Elevation: 554 ft (169 m)
- Time zone: UTC-6 (Central (CST))
  - Summer (DST): UTC-5 (CDT)
- Area code: 618
- GNIS feature ID: 424981

Hicks is an unincorporated community in Hardin County, Illinois, United States. Hicks is north of Rosiclare and Elizabethtown.
