= 2000 United States presidential election in Illinois =

- November 7, 2000
- Turnout: 69.18% (▲2.88 pp)

Nominee	Al Gore	George W. Bush
Party	Democratic	Republican
Home state	Tennessee	Texas
Running mate	Joe Lieberman	Dick Cheney
Electoral vote	22	0
Popular vote	2,589,026	2,019,421
Percentage	54.60%	42.58%

Gore
40–50%
50–60%
60–70%
70–80%
80–90%
Bush
40–50%
50–60%
60–70%
President before election
Bill Clinton
Democratic
Elected President
George W. Bush
Republican

The 2000 United States presidential election in Illinois took place on November 7, 2000, and was part of the 2000 United States presidential election. Voters chose 22 representatives, or electors, to the Electoral College, who voted for president and vice president.

Illinois was easily won by sitting Vice President Al Gore of the State of Tennessee, unlike other states in the Midwest, such as nearby Iowa, Michigan, Minnesota and Wisconsin, which Gore won, albeit by much smaller margins. George W. Bush, Republican of Texas, did not perform terribly at the county level, as he obtained less than forty percent of the vote in only three counties. Gore's key to victory was Cook County, home of Chicago, by far the most populous county in the state and one of the most populated counties in the nation. Gore won that county with almost seventy percent of the vote, his best performance in any county in the state.

The election marked the first time since 1976 that Illinois did not vote for the winning presidential nominee and marked an end to Illinois’ status as a bellwether state, as it had voted for the winning candidate all but two times in the 20th-century, making it tied with Missouri as having the most consistent streak of backing the winner in that century. Bush became the first Republican to win the White House without carrying Illinois; he also became the first Republican ever to win the White House without carrying Champaign, Peoria, or Whiteside counties. It was additionally the first election in which the Republicans outperformed in Southern Illinois, a previous Democratic stronghold. This was also the first time since 1848 that a Democrat would carry Illinois without winning the presidency.

Illinois was one of ten states that backed George H. W. Bush for president in 1988 that did not back George W. Bush in either 2000 or 2004.

== Primary elections ==
The primaries and general elections coincided with those for Congress and for state offices.

=== Turnout ===
For the state-run primaries (Democratic and Republican), turnout was 22.92%, with 1,546,588 votes cast. For the general election, turnout was 66.52%, with 4,742,123 votes cast.

=== Democratic ===
2000 Illinois Democratic presidential primary
- March 21, 2000

190 Democratic National Convention delegates (161 pledged, 29 unpledged) The number of pledged delegates received is determined by the popular vote
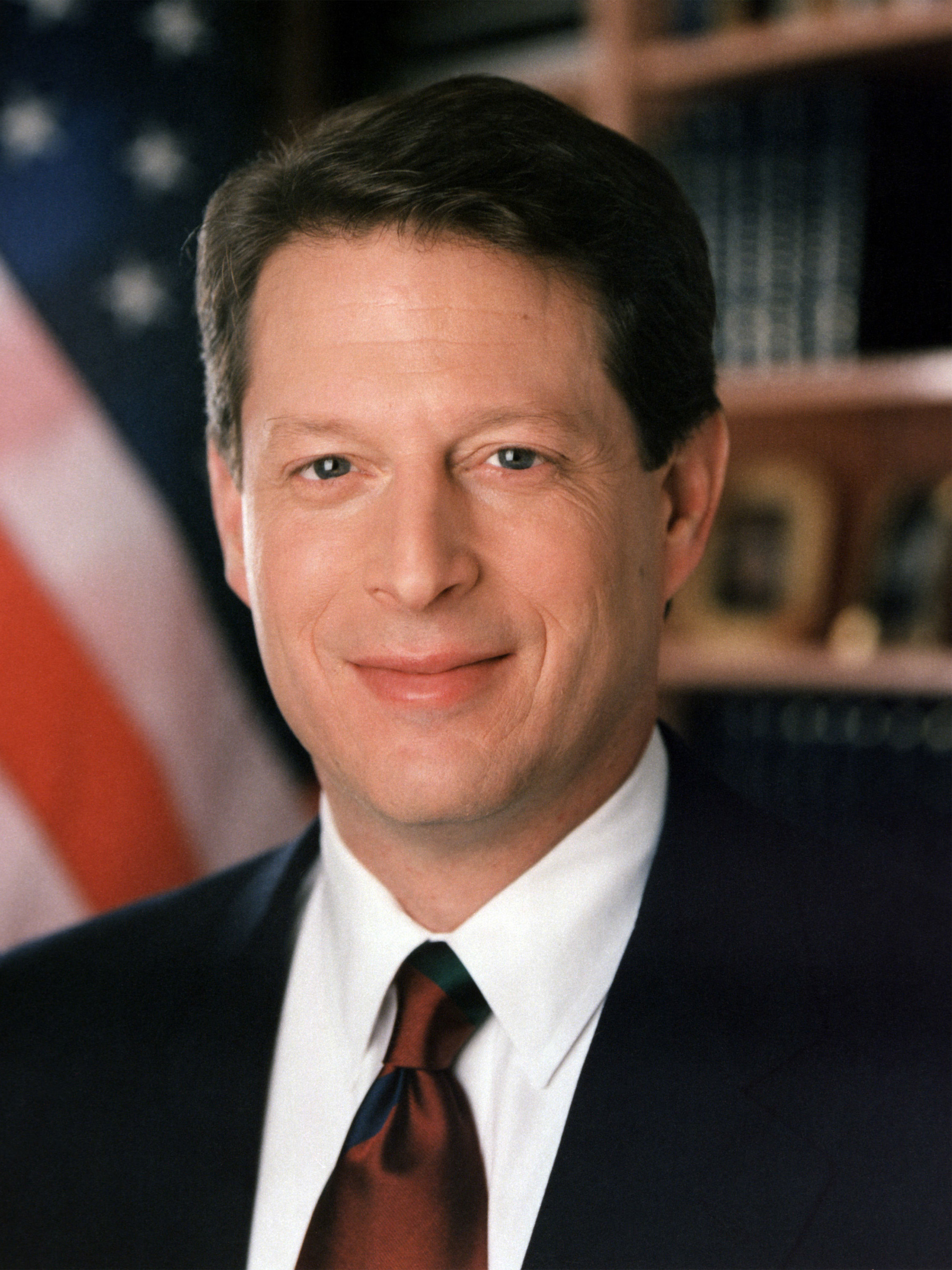

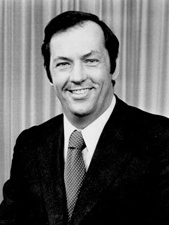
Candidate	Al Gore	Bill Bradley withdrawn
Home state	Tennessee	New Jersey
Delegate count	149	12
Popular vote	682,932	115,320
Percentage	84.35%	14.24%

The 2000 Illinois Democratic presidential primary was held on March 21, 2000 in Illinois, as one of the Democratic Party's statewide nomination contests ahead of the 2000 presidential election.

161 of the state's 190 delegates were pledged delegates elected in the primary (the remaining 29 delegates were superdelegates). Of the 161 pledged delegates, 35 were elected based upon the statewide popular vote, with the remaining 126 being elected based upon congressional district popular votes. In order to receive delegates from either the popular vote of either the state at-large of the popular vote of a congressional district, a candidate needed to reach the threshold of 15% or more of said vote.

2000 Illinois Democratic presidential primary
Candidate	Votes	%	Delegates
Al Gore	682,932	84.35	149
Bill Bradley withdrew	115,320	14.24	12
Lyndon LaRouche	11,415	1.41	0
Total	809,667	100%	161

=== Republican ===
2000 Illinois Republican presidential primary
- March 21, 2000

74 Republican National Convention delegates (64 pledged, 10 unpledged) Pledged delegates directly-elected in vote separate from statewide presidential preference vote

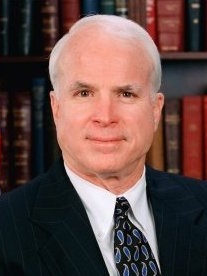

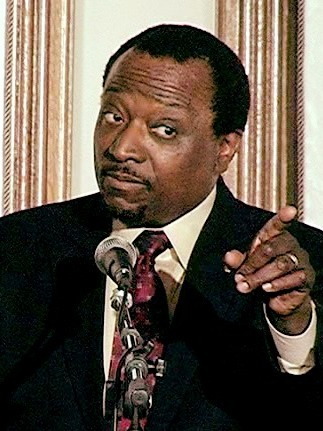
Candidate	George W. Bush	John McCain withdrawn	Alan Keyes
Home state	Texas	Arizona	Maryland
Delegate count	64	0	0
Popular vote	496,685	158,768	66,066
Percentage	67.40%	21.54%	8.97%

The 2000 Illinois Republican presidential primary was held on March 21, 2000 in Illinois, as one of the Republican Party's statewide nomination contests ahead of the 2000 presidential election.

Illinois assigned 60 directly elected delegates (the state had another 10 delegates that were not directly elected by voters). The Illinois primary was a so-called "oophole" primary. This meant that the statewide presidential preference vote was a "beauty contest", from which no delegates would be assigned. Instead, the delegates were assigned by separate direct votes on delegate candidates (whose proclaimed presidential preferences were listed beside their names on the ballot). These delegates were noted voted on at-large by a state vote, but rather by congressional district votes. The number of delegates each congressional district would be able to elect had been decided based upon the strength of that district's vote for the Republican nominee (Bob Dole) in the previous 1996 election.

The remaining ten delegates not directly elected by congressional district were selected at the Illinois Republican Party Convention, and were unpledged delegates.

2000 Illinois Republican presidential primary
Candidate	Votes	%	Delegates
George W. Bush	496,685	67.40	64
John McCain withdrawn	158,768	21.54	0
Alan Keyes	66,066	8.97	0
Steve Forbes withdrawn	10,334	1.40	0
Gary Bauer withdrawn	5,068	0.69	0
Total	736,921	100%	64

== General election ==
=== Polling ===
Poll source	Date(s)	Sample size	Margin of error	George W. Bush (R)	Al Gore (D)	Ralph Nader (G)	Other / undecided (Note: Calculated by taking the difference of 100% and all other listed candidates combined. For polls that do not report a figure for Nader, this includes his support.)
Zogby Analytics	November 5, 2000	584	—	43%	50%	7%	0%
Harris Insights & Analytics	November 3, 2000	8,957	—	45%	51%	1%	3%
Zogby Analytics	November 2, 2000	600	—	40%	49%	5%	6%
Research 2000	November 1, 2000	602	—	42%	48%	4%	6%
Zogby Analytics	October 30, 2000	600	—	42%	46%	4%	8%
Mason-Dixon Polling & Strategy	October 29, 2000	625	—	43%	46%	3%	8%
Zogby Analytics	October 27, 2000	600	—	41%	48%	3%	8%
Zogby Analytics	October 27, 2000	600	—	39%	46%	6%	9%
Opinion Dynamics	October 26, 2000	600	—	45%	42%	4%	9%
Rasmussen Reports	October 23, 2000	880	—	40%	44%	—	16%
Richard Day Research	October 23, 2000	801	—	38%	43%	4%	15%
Market Shares Corp.	October 22, 2000	899	—	35%	45%	4%	16%
KRC Research	October 17, 2000	600	—	43%	45%	4%	8%
Research 2000	October 17, 2000	601	—	40%	47%	3%	10%

=== Results ===
2000 United States presidential election in Illinois
Party	Candidate	Running mate	Votes	Percentage	Electoral votes
Democratic	Al Gore	Joe Lieberman	2,589,026	54.6%	22
Republican	George W. Bush	Dick Cheney	2,019,421	42.6%	0
Green	Ralph Nader	Winona LaDuke	103,759	2.2%	0
Reform	Pat Buchanan	Ezola Foster	16,106	0.3%	0
Libertarian	Harry Browne	Wayne Allyn Root	11,623	0.3%	0
Natural Law	John Hagelin	Mary Alice Herbert	2,127	0.0%	0
Constitution	Howard Phillips	Michael Peroutka	57	0.0%	0
Write In	David McReynolds	-	4	0.0%	0
Totals			4,742,123	100.00%	22
Voter turnout (voting age/registered)					52%/67%

==== Results by county ====
County	Al Gore Democratic		George W. Bush Republican		Ralph Nader Green		Various candidates Other parties		Margin		Total
County	#	%	#	%	#	%	#	%	#	%	Total
Adams	12,197	40.51%	17,331	57.56%	371	1.23%	210	0.70%	-5,134	-17.05%	30,109
Alexander	2,357	58.60%	1,588	39.48%	28	0.70%	49	1.22%	769	19.12%	4,022
Bond	3,060	43.52%	3,804	54.10%	113	1.61%	55	0.78%	-744	-10.58%	7,032
Boone	6,481	41.75%	8,617	55.51%	325	2.09%	100	0.64%	-2,136	-13.76%	15,523
Brown	1,077	40.49%	1,529	57.48%	29	1.09%	25	0.94%	-452	-16.99%	2,660
Bureau	7,754	46.09%	8,526	50.68%	363	2.16%	180	1.07%	-772	-4.59%	16,823
Calhoun	1,310	50.35%	1,229	47.23%	42	1.61%	21	0.81%	81	3.12%	2,602
Carroll	3,113	43.37%	3,835	53.43%	154	2.15%	75	1.05%	-722	-10.06%	7,177
Cass	2,789	47.28%	2,968	50.31%	94	1.59%	48	0.81%	-179	-3.03%	5,899
Champaign	35,515	47.81%	34,645	46.64%	3,543	4.77%	582	0.78%	870	1.17%	74,285
Christian	6,799	46.03%	7,537	51.03%	269	1.82%	166	1.12%	-738	-5.00%	14,771
Clark	2,932	39.03%	4,398	58.55%	126	1.68%	56	0.75%	-1,466	-19.52%	7,512
Clay	2,212	36.06%	3,789	61.76%	78	1.27%	56	0.91%	-1,577	-25.70%	6,135
Clinton	6,436	41.72%	8,588	55.67%	295	1.91%	108	0.70%	-2,152	-13.95%	15,427
Coles	8,904	44.31%	10,495	52.23%	507	2.52%	187	0.93%	-1,591	-7.92%	20,093
Cook	1,280,547	68.63%	534,542	28.65%	42,068	2.25%	8,750	0.47%	746,005	39.98%	1,865,907
Crawford	3,333	39.21%	4,974	58.52%	118	1.39%	75	0.88%	-1,641	-19.31%	8,500
Cumberland	1,870	37.59%	2,964	59.58%	72	1.45%	69	1.39%	-1,094	-21.99%	4,975
DeKalb	14,798	44.53%	17,139	51.57%	1,032	3.11%	264	0.79%	-2,341	-7.04%	33,233
DeWitt	2,870	40.70%	3,968	56.28%	133	1.89%	80	1.13%	-1,098	-15.58%	7,051
Douglas	3,215	39.44%	4,734	58.07%	132	1.62%	71	0.87%	-1,519	-18.63%	8,152
DuPage	152,550	41.87%	201,037	55.18%	8,711	2.39%	2,064	0.57%	-48,487	-13.31%	364,362
Edgar	3,216	39.07%	4,833	58.71%	113	1.37%	70	0.85%	-1,617	-19.64%	8,232
Edwards	978	30.00%	2,212	67.85%	42	1.29%	28	0.86%	-1,234	-37.85%	3,260
Effingham	4,225	29.17%	9,855	68.04%	213	1.47%	192	1.33%	-5,630	-38.87%	14,485
Fayette	3,886	41.61%	5,200	55.69%	122	1.31%	130	1.39%	-1,314	-14.08%	9,338
Ford	2,090	33.97%	3,889	63.20%	116	1.89%	58	0.94%	-1,799	-29.23%	6,153
Franklin	10,201	53.10%	8,490	44.19%	347	1.81%	174	0.91%	1,711	8.91%	19,212
Fulton	8,940	54.92%	6,936	42.61%	276	1.70%	125	0.77%	2,004	12.31%	16,277
Gallatin	1,878	52.78%	1,591	44.72%	40	1.12%	49	1.38%	287	8.06%	3,558
Greene	2,490	43.18%	3,129	54.26%	93	1.61%	55	0.95%	-639	-11.08%	5,767
Grundy	7,516	45.32%	8,709	52.51%	257	1.55%	102	0.62%	-1,193	-7.19%	16,584
Hamilton	1,943	42.36%	2,519	54.92%	75	1.64%	50	1.09%	-576	-12.56%	4,587
Hancock	4,256	43.92%	5,134	52.98%	161	1.66%	140	1.44%	-878	-9.06%	9,691
Hardin	1,184	44.90%	1,366	51.80%	41	1.55%	46	1.74%	-182	-6.90%	2,637
Henderson	2,030	52.51%	1,708	44.18%	74	1.91%	54	1.40%	322	8.33%	3,866
Henry	11,921	50.79%	10,896	46.43%	428	1.82%	225	0.96%	1,025	4.36%	23,470
Iroquois	4,397	32.75%	8,685	64.70%	229	1.71%	113	0.84%	-4,288	-31.95%	13,424
Jackson	11,773	50.99%	9,823	42.54%	1,228	5.32%	266	1.15%	1,950	8.45%	23,090
Jasper	1,815	36.15%	3,119	62.12%	50	1.00%	37	0.74%	-1,304	-25.97%	5,021
Jefferson	6,685	43.52%	8,362	54.44%	211	1.37%	102	0.66%	-1,677	-10.92%	15,360
Jersey	4,355	46.27%	4,699	49.92%	231	2.45%	128	1.36%	-344	-3.65%	9,413
Jo Daviess	4,585	44.42%	5,304	51.39%	314	3.04%	119	1.15%	-719	-6.97%	10,322
Johnson	1,928	35.96%	3,285	61.26%	83	1.55%	66	1.23%	-1,357	-25.30%	5,362
Kane	60,127	42.52%	76,996	54.45%	3,274	2.32%	1,008	0.71%	-16,869	-11.93%	141,405
Kankakee	19,180	47.73%	20,049	49.89%	713	1.77%	241	0.60%	-869	-2.16%	40,183
Kendall	8,444	37.09%	13,688	60.12%	481	2.11%	156	0.69%	-5,244	-23.03%	22,769
Knox	12,572	54.25%	9,912	42.77%	455	1.96%	235	1.01%	2,660	11.48%	23,174
Lake	115,058	47.51%	120,988	49.96%	4,843	2.00%	1,275	0.53%	-5,930	-2.45%	242,164
LaSalle	23,355	50.76%	21,276	46.25%	992	2.16%	384	0.83%	2,079	4.51%	46,007
Lawrence	2,822	42.90%	3,594	54.64%	101	1.54%	61	0.93%	-772	-11.74%	6,578
Lee	6,111	41.80%	8,069	55.19%	320	2.19%	120	0.82%	-1,958	-13.39%	14,620
Livingston	5,829	37.80%	9,187	59.57%	285	1.85%	120	0.78%	-3,358	-21.77%	15,421
Logan	4,600	35.21%	8,141	62.31%	208	1.59%	116	0.89%	-3,541	-27.10%	13,065
Macon	24,262	49.02%	23,830	48.14%	982	1.98%	425	0.86%	432	0.88%	49,499
Macoupin	11,015	51.50%	9,749	45.58%	426	1.99%	199	0.93%	1,266	5.92%	21,389
Madison	59,077	53.17%	48,821	43.94%	2,359	2.12%	847	0.76%	10,256	9.23%	111,104
Marion	8,068	48.42%	8,240	49.45%	238	1.43%	117	0.70%	-172	-1.03%	16,663
Marshall	2,570	43.51%	3,145	53.24%	134	2.27%	58	0.98%	-575	-9.73%	5,907
Mason	3,192	47.14%	3,411	50.37%	117	1.73%	52	0.77%	-219	-3.23%	6,772
Massac	2,912	43.18%	3,676	54.51%	83	1.23%	73	1.08%	-764	-11.33%	6,744
McDonough	6,080	46.73%	6,465	49.68%	364	2.80%	103	0.79%	-385	-2.95%	13,012
McHenry	40,698	38.33%	62,112	58.49%	2,751	2.59%	624	0.59%	-21,414	-20.16%	106,185
McLean	24,936	40.95%	34,008	55.84%	1,546	2.54%	408	0.67%	-9,072	-14.89%	60,898
Menard	2,164	34.89%	3,862	62.27%	135	2.18%	41	0.66%	-1,698	-27.38%	6,202
Mercer	4,400	52.90%	3,688	44.34%	156	1.88%	74	0.89%	712	8.56%	8,318
Monroe	5,797	42.02%	7,632	55.32%	262	1.90%	105	0.76%	-1,835	-13.30%	13,796
Montgomery	6,542	49.97%	6,226	47.55%	191	1.46%	134	1.02%	316	2.42%	13,093
Morgan	5,899	41.15%	8,058	56.22%	253	1.77%	124	0.87%	-2,159	-15.07%	14,334
Moultrie	2,529	44.17%	3,058	53.41%	78	1.36%	60	1.05%	-529	-9.24%	5,725
Ogle	7,673	37.25%	12,325	59.83%	467	2.27%	136	0.66%	-4,652	-22.58%	20,601
Peoria	38,604	50.26%	36,398	47.39%	1,332	1.73%	478	0.62%	2,206	2.87%	76,812
Perry	4,862	48.90%	4,802	48.30%	173	1.74%	105	1.06%	60	0.60%	9,942
Piatt	3,488	41.60%	4,619	55.09%	217	2.59%	61	0.73%	-1,131	-13.49%	8,385
Pike	3,198	39.42%	4,706	58.01%	115	1.42%	93	1.15%	-1,508	-18.59%	8,112
Pope	927	39.79%	1,346	57.77%	31	1.33%	26	1.12%	-419	-17.98%	2,330
Pulaski	1,518	50.33%	1,430	47.41%	31	1.03%	37	1.23%	88	2.92%	3,016
Putnam	1,657	52.12%	1,437	45.20%	58	1.82%	27	0.85%	220	6.92%	3,179
Randolph	6,794	47.55%	7,127	49.88%	229	1.60%	137	0.96%	-333	-2.33%	14,287
Richland	2,491	33.54%	4,718	63.52%	134	1.80%	85	1.14%	-2,227	-29.98%	7,428
Rock Island	37,957	58.31%	25,194	38.70%	1,364	2.10%	580	0.89%	12,763	19.61%	65,095
Saline	5,427	46.58%	5,933	50.93%	181	1.55%	109	0.94%	-506	-4.35%	11,650
Sangamon	38,414	41.99%	50,374	55.06%	2,001	2.19%	696	0.76%	-11,960	-13.07%	91,485
Schuyler	1,587	42.07%	2,077	55.06%	72	1.91%	36	0.95%	-490	-12.99%	3,772
Scott	954	38.64%	1,458	59.05%	31	1.26%	26	1.05%	-504	-20.41%	2,469
Shelby	4,018	39.54%	5,851	57.57%	162	1.59%	132	1.30%	-1,833	-18.03%	10,163
St. Clair	55,961	55.74%	42,299	42.13%	1,569	1.56%	564	0.56%	13,662	13.61%	100,393
Stark	1,211	40.52%	1,694	56.67%	55	1.84%	29	0.97%	-483	-16.15%	2,989
Stephenson	8,062	41.60%	10,715	55.29%	476	2.46%	125	0.65%	-2,653	-13.69%	19,378
Tazewell	25,379	43.50%	31,537	54.05%	1,022	1.75%	410	0.70%	-6,158	-10.55%	58,348
Union	3,982	45.98%	4,397	50.77%	189	2.18%	92	1.06%	-415	-4.79%	8,660
Vermilion	15,406	47.99%	15,783	49.17%	605	1.88%	306	0.95%	-377	-1.18%	32,100
Wabash	1,987	36.07%	3,406	61.84%	75	1.36%	40	0.73%	-1,419	-25.77%	5,508
Warren	3,524	46.18%	3,899	51.09%	130	1.70%	78	1.02%	-375	-4.91%	7,631
Washington	2,638	36.96%	4,353	60.98%	96	1.34%	51	0.71%	-1,715	-24.02%	7,138
Wayne	2,209	28.71%	5,347	69.50%	77	1.00%	60	0.78%	-3,138	-40.79%	7,693
White	2,958	38.73%	4,521	59.20%	113	1.48%	45	0.59%	-1,563	-20.47%	7,637
Whiteside	12,886	51.88%	11,252	45.30%	515	2.07%	184	0.74%	1,634	6.58%	24,837
Will	90,902	47.43%	95,828	50.00%	3,769	1.97%	1,171	0.61%	-4,926	-2.57%	191,670
Williamson	12,192	45.26%	14,012	52.01%	476	1.77%	259	0.96%	-1,820	-6.75%	26,939
Winnebago	51,981	47.56%	53,816	49.24%	2,637	2.41%	863	0.79%	-1,835	-1.68%	109,297
Woodford	5,529	32.92%	10,905	64.94%	263	1.57%	96	0.57%	-5,376	-32.02%	16,793
Totals	2,589,026	54.60%	2,019,421	42.58%	103,759	2.19%	29,917	0.63%	569,605	12.02%	4,742,123

===== Counties that flipped from Democratic to Republican =====
- Bond (largest city: Greenville)
- Bureau (largest city: Princeton)
- Cass (largest city: Beardstown)
- Christian (largest city: Taylorville)
- Clay (largest city: Flora)
- Clinton (largest city: Breese)
- Coles (largest city: Charleston)
- DeKalb (largest city: DeKalb)
- Fayette (largest city: Vandalia)
- Greene (largest city: Carrollton)
- Grundy (largest city: Morris)
- Hamilton (largest city: McLeansboro)
- Hancock (largest city: Hamilton)
- Hardin (largest city: Rosiclare)
- Jefferson (largest city: Mount Vernon)
- Jersey (largest city: Jerseyville)
- Jo Daviess (largest city: Galena)
- Kankakee (largest city: Kankakee)
- Lake (largest city: Waukegan)
- Lawrence (largest city: Lawrenceville)
- Marion (largest city: Centralia)
- Marshall (largest city: Henry)
- Mason (largest city: Havana)
- Massac (largest city: Metropolis)
- McDonough (largest city: Macomb)
- Moultrie (largest city: Sullivan)
- Piatt (largest city: Monticello)
- Pike (largest city: Pittsfield)
- Pope (largest city: Golconda)
- Randolph (largest city: Chester)
- Saline (largest city: Harrisburg)
- Schuyler (largest city: Rushville)
- Shelby (largest city: Shelbyville)
- Union (largest city: Anna)
- Vermilion (largest city: Danville)
- Warren (largest city: Monmouth)
- White (largest city: Carmi)
- Will (largest city: Joliet)
- Williamson (largest city: Marion)
- Winnebago (largest city: Rockford)

==== By congressional district ====
Gore won 11 of 20 congressional districts, including two that elected Republicans.

District	Gore	Bush	Representative
1st	87%	11%	Bobby Rush
2nd	88%	11%	Jesse Jackson Jr.
3rd	55%	41%	Bill Lipinski
4th	78%	18%	Luis Gutierrez
5th	63%	33%	Rod Blagojevich
6th	45%	52%	Henry Hyde
7th	83%	15%	Danny K. Davis
8th	42%	55%	Phil Crane
9th	70%	26%	Jan Schakowsky
10th	53%	45%	John Porter
10th	53%	45%	Mark Kirk
11th	53%	45%	Jerry Weller
12th	55%	42%	Jerry Costello
13th	42%	55%	Judy Biggert
14th	42%	55%	Dennis Hastert
15th	44%	52%	Thomas W. Ewing
15th	44%	52%	Timothy V. Johnson
16th	43%	54%	Donald Manzullo
17th	51%	46%	Lane Evans
18th	43%	55%	Ray LaHood
19th	43%	54%	David D. Phelps
20th	45%	52%	John Shimkus

== Analysis ==
Vice President Al Gore easily defeated Texas Governor George W. Bush in the “Land of Lincoln”. Illinois was once reckoned as a swing state or slightly Republican-leaning, but, since Bill Clinton's election in 1992, it swung heavily for the Democrats at the presidential level, remaining heavily Democratic in 1996. The blue trend can chiefly be traced to the explosive increase in the Democratic margins in Cook County, which encompasses Chicago and its inner suburbs and is the second-largest county in the country. In 1996, Bill Clinton reached 66.8% of the vote in Cook County, a level exceeding any nominee's in the county since Warren G. Harding in 1920, and Gore improved on Clinton's vote share in the county still further.

Secondarily, although Bush still retained the famously Republican Chicago collar counties, he underperformed recent competitive Republicans in them. He won DuPage County, the largest collar county, by only 13.3%, as compared to Gerald Ford's 40.5% margin in the county in 1976, and his father's 39.4% margin in 1988 (in both of which DuPage County provided the Republican's entire statewide margin).

Bush did do well in much of rural Illinois, although Gore retained a number of counties in the Forgottonia region that had begun going Democratic in 1988. Gore also did well in Metro East, whereas Bush held moderately-populated Sangamon County (Springfield) and McLean County (Bloomington). Ultimately, Gore's overwhelming strength in Cook County was decisive in handing Gore a more than five hundred thousand vote (or 12%) advantage in the state, which was among the first Midwestern states to be called on election night.

As of the 2024 presidential election, this is the last election in which Franklin County and Perry County voted for a Democratic presidential candidate.

== Electors ==
Technically the voters of Illinois cast their ballots for electors: representatives to the Electoral College. For this election, Illinois is allocated 22 electors because it has 20 congressional districts and two senators. All candidates who appear on the ballot or qualify to receive write-in votes must submit a list of 22 electors, who pledge to vote for their candidate and his or her running mate. Whoever wins the majority of votes in the state is awarded all 22 electoral votes. Their chosen electors then vote for president and vice president. Although electors are pledged to their candidate and running mate, they are not obligated to vote for them. An elector who votes for someone other than his or her candidate is known as a faithless elector.

The electors of each state and the District of Columbia met on December 18, 2000 to cast their votes for president and vice president. The Electoral College itself never meets as one body. Instead, the electors from each state and the District of Columbia met in their respective capitols.

The following were the members of the Electoral College from the state. All were pledged to and voted for Gore and Lieberman:

1. Joan Brennan
2. Dave Bybee
3. Vilma Colom
4. Barbara Flynn Currie
5. John P. Daley
6. Vera Davis
7. James DeLeo
8. Marge Friedman
9. Charles A. Hartke
10. Tinker Harvey
11. Carolyn Brown Hodge
12. Constance A. Howard
13. Mary Lou Kearns
14. Michael J. Madigan
15. William Marovitz
16. Shirley McCombs
17. Molly McKenzie
18. Victory McNamara
19. John Nelson
20. Donald Pedro
21. Dan Pierce
22. Jerry Sinclair

== See also ==
- United States presidential elections in Illinois
