= Sparks Hill, Illinois =

- Unincorporated community
- Location within Illinois Location within the United States
- Coordinates: 37°35′05″N 88°17′13″W
- Country: United States
- State: Illinois
- County: Hardin
- Elevation: 607 ft (185 m)
- Time zone: UTC-6 (Central (CST))
  - Summer (DST): UTC-5 (CDT)
- Area code: 618
- GNIS feature ID: 425509

Sparks Hill is an unincorporated community in Hardin County, Illinois, United States. Sparks Hill is north of Elizabethtown.
