= Eichorn =

Eichorn may refer to:

- Eichorn, Illinois, United States, an unincorporated community
- Dennis P. Eichhorn (1945–2015), American writer
- Jules Marquard Eichorn (1912–2000), American mountaineer, environmentalist, and music teacher
- Justin David Eichorn (born 1984), American politician
- Walter & Ida Eichorn, Owners of Eden Hotel in La Falda, Argentina
