= Etown =

Etown or E-town may refer to:

- Evanston, Illinois, home to Northwestern University
- Beijing E-Town (Chinese: 北京亦庄), a government agency of Beijing that operates a special economic zone for high tech manufacturing and makes investments in technology companies
- A nickname for various communities named Elizabethtown (disambiguation)
- Elizabethtown College, in Pennsylvania
- eTown, a variety radio program
- Edmonton, capital city of the Canadian province of Alberta
