= Illinois Iron Furnace =

- U.S. National Register of Historic Places
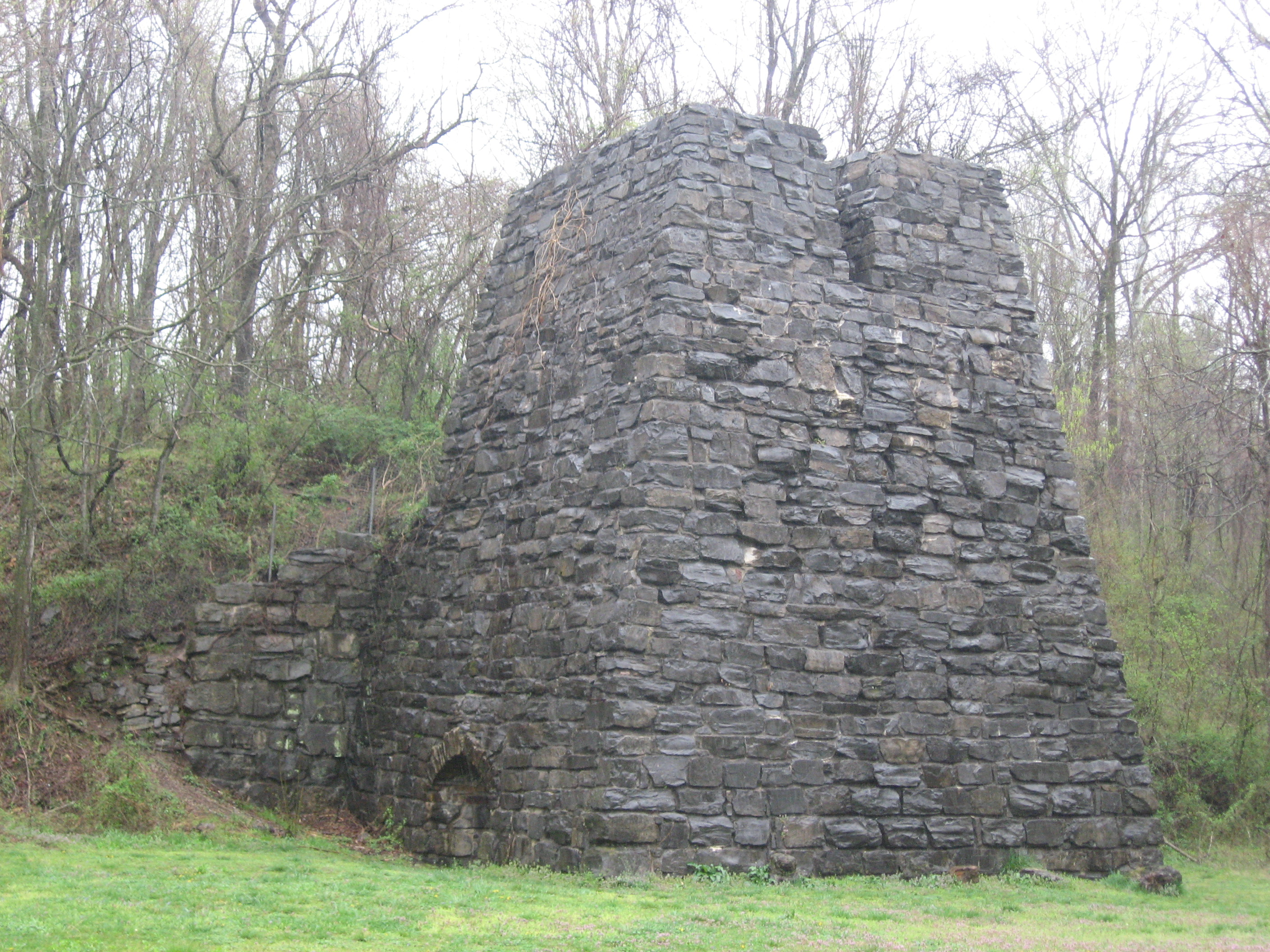

- Location within Illinois Location within the United States
- Nearest city: Rosiclare, Illinois
- Coordinates: 37°29′58″N 88°19′41″W
- Area: 9.9 acres (4.0 ha)
- NRHP reference No.: 73000704
- Added to NRHP: March 7, 1973

The Illinois Iron Furnace is a historic iron furnace located in Shawnee National Forest near Rosiclare, Illinois. The stone and brick furnace was built sometime between 1837 and 1839 and was originally owned by businessmen Chalon Guard and Leonard White. The furnace was used to smelt locally mined iron ore; the resulting iron pigs were transported to Elizabethtown, Illinois, where they were shipped elsewhere along the Ohio River. The furnace ceased operations from 1861 to 1868 due to transport and labor shortages created by the Civil War; while local legend holds that the furnace provided iron to the Union navy yard at Mound City, this could have only been possible through stockpiled iron. The furnace closed permanently in 1883, marking the end of Illinois' iron industry.

The furnace was heavily damaged by highway construction in the 1930s. The U.S. Forest Service's Golconda Job Corps Center rebuilt the furnace in 1967 in order to preserve the structure. The reconstruction effort also converted the surrounding area into a picnic site and established a visitor information center narrating the history of the furnace and Illinois' iron industry. The furnace was added to the National Register of Historic Places in 1973. It is the only surviving iron furnace from the area's iron industry, which was the only completely native iron industry in the state.
