= Peters Creek, Illinois =

- Unincorporated community
- Location within Illinois Location within the United States
- Coordinates: 37°29′16″N 88°14′29″W
- Country: United States
- State: Illinois
- County: Hardin
- Elevation: 456 ft (139 m)
- Time zone: UTC-6 (Central (CST))
  - Summer (DST): UTC-5 (CDT)
- Area code: 618
- GNIS feature ID: 425324

Peters Creek is an unincorporated community in Hardin County, Illinois, United States. Peters Creek is located on Illinois Route 146, northeast of Elizabethtown.

== Notable people ==
- Logan Belt (October 10, 1840 - Jun. 6, 1887) was the outlaw leader of the Logan Belt Gang in Hardin County, Illinois.
