= Hardin County Courthouse =

Hardin County Courthouse may refer to:

- Hardin County Courthouse (Illinois)
- Hardin County Courthouse (Iowa), listed on the National Register of Historic Places (NRHP)
- Hardin County Courthouse (Kentucky)
- Hardin County Courthouse (Ohio), NRHP-listed
- Hardin County Courthouse (Texas)
