= Hardin County, Illinois =

County in Illinois, United States

- County
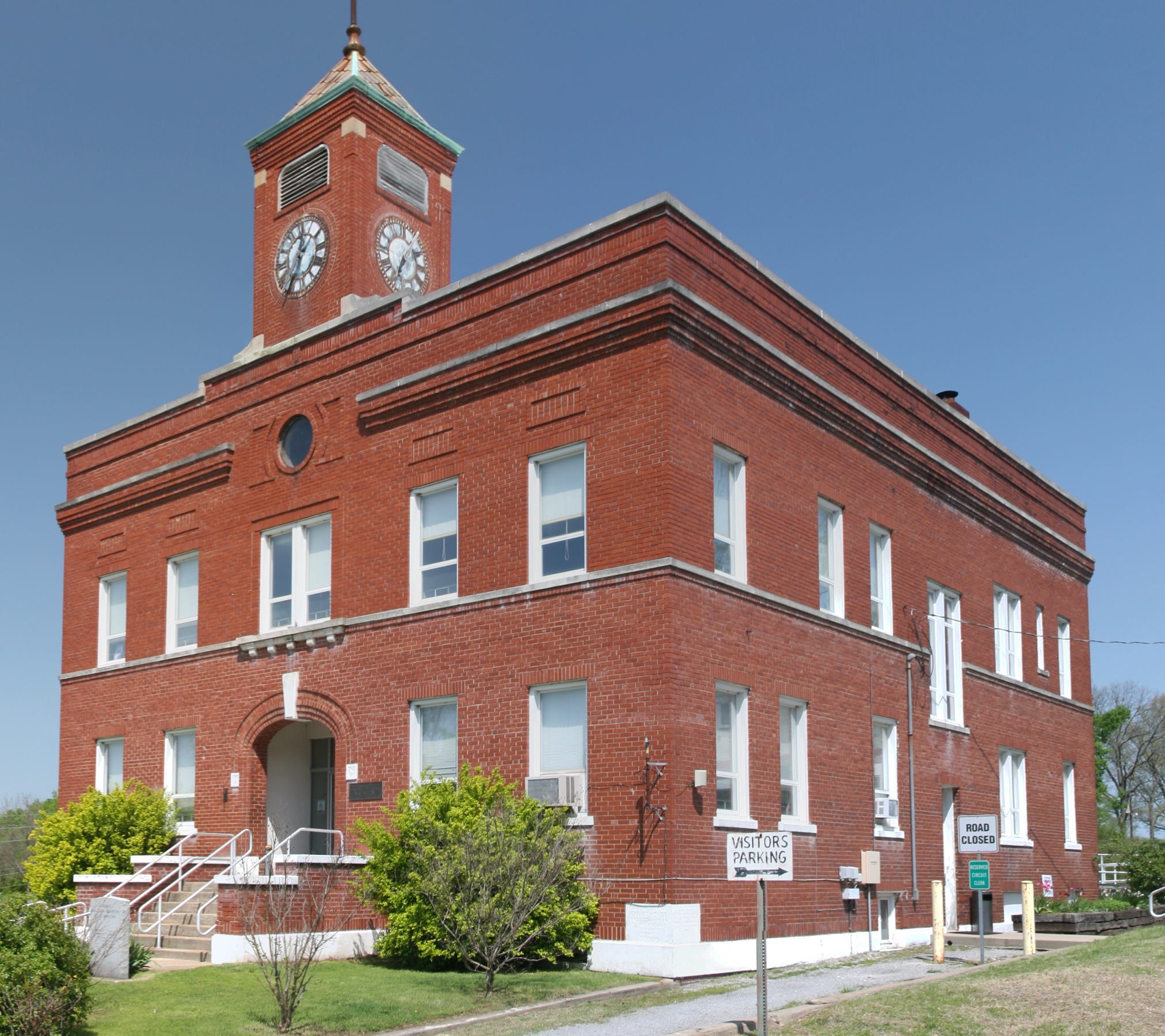
- Hardin County Courthouse in Elizabethtown

- Location within the U.S. state of Illinois
- Coordinates: 37°31′53″N 88°22′06″W
- Country: United States
- State: Illinois
- Founded: 1839
- Named for: Hardin County, Kentucky
- Seat: Elizabethtown
- Largest city: Rosiclare

Area
  - Total: 182 sq mi (470 km^{2})
  - Land: 178 sq mi (460 km^{2})
  - Water: 4.1 sq mi (11 km^{2}) 2.2%

Population (2020)
  - Total: 3,649
  - Estimate (2025): 3,588 ▼
  - Density: 20.5/sq mi (7.92/km^{2})
- Time zone: UTC−6 (Central)
  - Summer (DST): UTC−5 (CDT)
- Congressional district: 12th

Topology of Hicks Dome in Hardin and Pope counties

Hardin County is a county located in the U.S. state of Illinois. According to the 2020 census, it has a population of 3,649, making it the least populous county in Illinois. Its county seat is Elizabethtown. Hardin County is located in the part of the state known as Little Egypt. Hardin County was named for Hardin County, Kentucky, which was named in honor of Colonel John Hardin, an officer in the American Revolutionary War and the Northwest Indian War.

== History ==
Hardin County was formed in 1839 from Pope County. Additional area was later added from Gallatin County. Hardin County was named for Hardin County, Kentucky, which was named in honor of Colonel John Hardin, an officer in the American Revolutionary War and the Northwest Indian War. Hardin was murdered by Shawnee Indians while he was on a peace mission in 1792 for President George Washington, in what is now Shelby County, Ohio. In the 1790s and early 1800s, the Hardin County area, especially Cave-In-Rock, was notorious as a stronghold used by outlaws, bandits, river pirates, and counterfeiters.

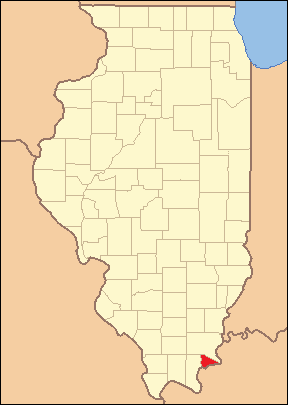
Hardin County between 1839 and 1847

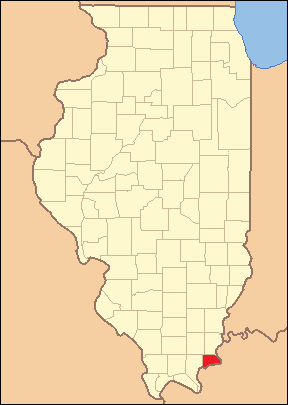
Hardin in 1847, when it was enlarged to its current size

== Geography ==
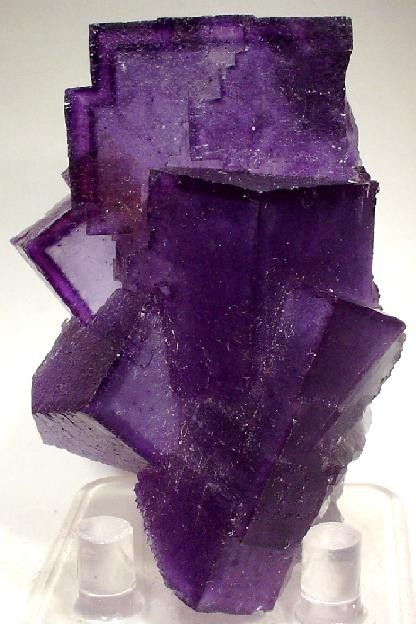
Fluorite mineral specimen from Hardin County

According to the U.S. Census Bureau, the county has a total area of 182 square miles (470 km^{2}), of which 178 square miles (460 km^{2}) is land and 4.1 square miles (11 km^{2}) (2.2%) is water. It is the second-smallest county in Illinois by area.

Hicks Dome (37.53139°N 88.36833°W) is a geological feature in Hardin County. The Hicks Dome is underlain by ultramafic igneous rocks and igneous diatremes or breccia pipes. Most geologists accept the theory that the older rocks at the center of the uplift are a result of this deep-seated igneous activity. This activity may also have provided the fluorine in the fluorspar deposits in the region. Fluorspar, or calcium fluoride, was mined in Hardin County until the early 1990s.

=== Climate and weather ===
Elizabethtown, Illinois

Climate chart (precipitation, max. and min. temperature)
J	F	M	A	M	J	J	A	S	O	N	D
3.5 41 21	3.7 47 24	4.7 57 33	4.8 68 42	5 76 52	4.2 84 60	4.2 87 65	3.5 87 63	3.2 80 55	3.2 70 43	4.4 57 34	4.3 46 25
- █ Average max. and min. temperatures in °F
- █ Precipitation totals in inches
- Source: The Weather Channel
Metric conversion
J	F	M	A	M	J	J	A	S	O	N	D
88 5 −6	93 8 −4	120 14 1	121 20 6	128 24 11	106 29 16	107 31 18	89 31 17	82 27 13	82 21 6	112 14 1	109 8 −4
- █ Average max. and min. temperatures in °C
- █ Precipitation totals in mm

In recent years, average temperatures in the county seat of Elizabethtown have ranged from a low of 21 °F (−6 °C) in January to a high of 87 °F (31 °C) in July, although a record low of −22 °F (−30 °C) was recorded in January 1994 and a record high of 104 °F (40 °C) was recorded in August 2007. Average monthly precipitation ranged from 3.22 inches (82 mm) in October to 5.02 inches (128 mm) in May.

=== Adjacent counties ===
- Gallatin County - north
- Union County, Kentucky - east
- Crittenden County, Kentucky - south
- Livingston County, Kentucky - southwest
- Pope County - west
- Saline County - northwest

=== Transit ===
- Rides Mass Transit District

=== Major highways ===
- Illinois Route 1
- Illinois Route 34
- Illinois Route 146

=== National protected area ===
- Shawnee National Forest (part)

== Demographics ==
Historical population
Census	Pop.	Note	%±
1840	1,378		—
1850	2,887		109.5%
1860	3,759		30.2%
1870	5,113		36.0%
1880	6,024		17.8%
1890	7,234		20.1%
1900	7,448		3.0%
1910	7,015		−5.8%
1920	7,533		7.4%
1930	6,955		−7.7%
1940	7,759		11.6%
1950	7,530		−3.0%
1960	5,879		−21.9%
1970	4,914		−16.4%
1980	5,383		9.5%
1990	5,189		−3.6%
2000	4,800		−7.5%
2010	4,320		−10.0%
2020	3,649		−15.5%
2025 (est.)	3,588	▼	−1.7%
U.S. Decennial Census; 1790-1960 1900-1990; 1990-2000 2010-2017

2000 census age pyramid for Hardin County

=== Racial and ethnic composition ===
Hardin County, Illinois – Racial and ethnic composition Note: the US Census treats Hispanic/Latino as an ethnic category. This table excludes Latinos from the racial categories and assigns them to a separate category. Hispanics/Latinos may be of any race.
Race / Ethnicity (NH = Non-Hispanic)	Pop 1980	Pop 1990	Pop 2000	Pop 2010	Pop 2020	% 1980	% 1990	% 2000	% 2010	% 2020
White alone (NH)	5,356	5,044	4,554	4,171	3,374	99.50%	97.21%	94.88%	96.55%	92.46%
Black or African American alone (NH)	2	84	132	13	11	0.04%	1.62%	2.75%	0.30%	0.30%
Native American or Alaska Native alone (NH)	4	16	2	26	0	0.07%	0.31%	0.04%	0.60%	0.00%
Asian alone (NH)	6	13	24	22	17	0.11%	0.25%	0.50%	0.51%	0.47%
Native Hawaiian or Pacific Islander alone (NH)	x	x	6	5	2	x	x	0.13%	0.12%	0.05%
Other race alone (NH)	2	2	0	0	4	0.04%	0.04%	0.00%	0.00%	0.11%
Mixed race or Multiracial (NH)	x	x	31	27	176	x	x	0.65%	0.63%	4.82%
Hispanic or Latino (any race)	13	30	51	56	65	0.24%	0.58%	1.06%	1.30%	1.78%
Total	5,383	5,189	4,800	4,320	3,649	100.00%	100.00%	100.00%	100.00%	100.00%

=== 2020 census ===
As of the 2020 census, the county had a population of 3,649, the median age was 52.2 years, 18.2% of residents were under the age of 18, and 29.2% were 65 years of age or older. For every 100 females there were 97.6 males, and for every 100 females age 18 and over there were 98.5 males age 18 and over.

As of the 2020 census, the racial makeup of the county was 93.6% White, 0.4% Black or African American, <0.1% American Indian and Alaska Native, 0.5% Asian, 0.1% Native Hawaiian and Pacific Islander, 0.5% from some other race, and 5.0% from two or more races; Hispanic or Latino residents of any race comprised 1.8% of the population.

As of the 2020 census, <0.1% of residents lived in urban areas, while 100.0% lived in rural areas.

As of the 2020 census, there were 1,701 households in the county, of which 22.9% had children under the age of 18 living in them. Of all households, 41.0% were married-couple households, 23.8% were households with a male householder and no spouse or partner present, and 28.0% were households with a female householder and no spouse or partner present, while about 37.5% of all households were made up of individuals and 20.4% had someone living alone who was 65 years of age or older. There were 2,196 housing units, of which 22.5% were vacant; among occupied housing units, 77.5% were owner-occupied and 22.5% were renter-occupied, with a homeowner vacancy rate of 2.3% and a rental vacancy rate of 9.3%.

=== 2010 census ===
As of the 2010 census, there were 4,320 people, 1,915 households, and 1,234 families residing in the county. The population density was 24.3 inhabitants per square mile (9.4/km^{2}). There were 2,488 housing units at an average density of 14.0 per square mile (5.4/km^{2}). The racial makeup of the county was 97.3% white, 0.6% American Indian, 0.5% Asian, 0.3% black or African American, 0.1% Pacific islander, 0.3% from other races, and 0.8% from two or more races. Those of Hispanic or Latino origin made up 1.3% of the population. In terms of ancestry, 26.5% were Irish, 23.8% were German, 10.4% were English, and 4.3% were American.

Of the 1,915 households, 26.0% had children under the age of 18 living with them, 50.9% were married couples living together, 9.2% had a female householder with no husband present, 35.6% were non-families, and 31.7% of all households were made up of individuals. The average household size was 2.25 and the average family size was 2.78. The median age was 46.3 years.

The median income for a household in the county was $27,578 and the median income for a family was $38,576. Males had a median income of $42,955 versus $26,683 for females. The per capita income for the county was $18,515. About 17.4% of families and 22.3% of the population were below the poverty line, including 37.4% of those under age 18 and 14.6% of those age 65 or over.

== Communities ==
=== City ===
- Rosiclare

=== Villages ===
- Cave-In-Rock
- Elizabethtown

=== Unincorporated communities ===
- Cadiz
- Eichorn
- Finneyville
- Gross
- Hicks
- Karbers Ridge
- Lamb
- Loves Corner
- Peters Creek
- Rock Creek
- Saline Landing
- Shetlerville
- Sparks Hill

=== Precincts ===
- Cave-In-Rock Precinct
- East Rosiclare Precinct
- McFarlan Precinct
- Monroe Precinct
- Rock Precinct
- Rosiclare Precinct
- Stone Church Precinct
- West Rosiclare Precinct

=== Ghost towns ===
- Chambers Creek
- Fairview Landing
- Grosville
- Hall Ridge
- Hester
- Illinois Furnace
- Lambtown
- Martha Furnace
- McFarlan
- Parkinson's Landing
- Robin's Ferry
- Sellers
- Sellers Landing
- Twitchell's Mills
- Wolrab Mills

== Notable people ==
- James Ford (1775-1833), civic leader and secret criminal leader of a gang of Ohio River pirates and highwaymen
- James Karber (1914–1976), Illinois lawyer, businessman, and politician
- Isaiah L. Potts (1784?-after 1843), tavern keeper of the notorious Potts Tavern who, allegedly, ran a gang of pirates and highwaymen
- Jennifer Rhodes (1947-), television and film actress from Rosiclare
- Sturdivant Gang, 19th century counterfeiters in Rosiclare

== Politics ==
United States presidential election results for Hardin County, Illinois
Year	Republican		Democratic		Third party(ies)	
Year	No.	%	No.	%	No.	%
1892	660	43.11%	700	45.72%	171	11.17%
1896	780	46.15%	900	53.25%	10	0.59%
1900	753	46.31%	839	51.60%	34	2.09%
1904	756	49.09%	642	41.69%	142	9.22%
1908	813	52.52%	680	43.93%	55	3.55%
1912	691	43.60%	644	40.63%	250	15.77%
1916	1,419	51.68%	1,264	46.03%	63	2.29%
1920	1,555	61.54%	943	37.32%	29	1.15%
1924	1,378	49.06%	1,358	48.34%	73	2.60%
1928	1,758	64.35%	933	34.15%	41	1.50%
1932	1,559	48.37%	1,610	49.95%	54	1.68%
1936	2,008	50.06%	1,984	49.46%	19	0.47%
1940	2,333	53.84%	1,974	45.56%	26	0.60%
1944	2,037	59.25%	1,370	39.85%	31	0.90%
1948	1,713	55.49%	1,358	43.99%	16	0.52%
1952	1,984	55.84%	1,563	43.99%	6	0.17%
1956	1,919	56.93%	1,444	42.84%	8	0.24%
1960	1,944	56.96%	1,465	42.92%	4	0.12%
1964	1,324	44.68%	1,639	55.32%	0	0.00%
1968	1,492	51.75%	1,199	41.59%	192	6.66%
1972	1,915	62.54%	1,140	37.23%	7	0.23%
1976	1,393	46.17%	1,602	53.10%	22	0.73%
1980	1,721	55.27%	1,314	42.20%	79	2.54%
1984	1,689	58.26%	1,205	41.57%	5	0.17%
1988	1,504	53.26%	1,308	46.32%	12	0.42%
1992	985	31.04%	1,665	52.47%	523	16.48%
1996	790	30.19%	1,323	50.55%	504	19.26%
2000	1,366	51.80%	1,184	44.90%	87	3.30%
2004	1,501	61.59%	923	37.87%	13	0.53%
2008	1,330	58.80%	892	39.43%	40	1.77%
2012	1,535	65.88%	742	31.85%	53	2.27%
2016	1,653	76.96%	420	19.55%	75	3.49%
2020	1,691	78.21%	449	20.77%	22	1.02%
2024	1,546	79.98%	357	18.47%	30	1.55%

In its early history, Hardin County was opposed to the “Yankee” Republican Party and its Civil War against the South – with whom it was closely allied both culturally and economically. It did not vote for a Republican presidential candidate until Theodore Roosevelt’s 1904 landslide.

Since 1904, however, Hardin County has turned powerfully Republican. Like the nearby counties of Johnson, Massac and Pope, it managed to remain loyal to William Howard Taft during the 1912 election when the Republican Party was mortally divided. Hardin County would next be carried by a Democratic presidential candidate in Franklin D. Roosevelt’s 1932 landslide victory, and not after that until Lyndon Johnson in 1964. The county did trend Democratic in the following three decades, actually voting more Democratic than the nation at-large between 1972 and 1996. Nonetheless, since 2000 Hardin County has followed the same political trajectory as Tennessee, Missouri, Kentucky, West Virginia and Appalachian regions of adjacent states, whereby the Democratic Party's liberal views on social issues have produced dramatic swings to the Republican Party amongst its almost entirely Southern white population. The past six Presidential elections have observed a swing totalling 79 percentage points to the GOP, with Hillary Clinton in 2016 receiving barely half the proportion of the worst-performing Democrat from before 2010.

== See also ==
- National Register of Historic Places listings in Hardin County, Illinois.
- 38th parallel structures, of which Hicks Dome is the easternmost member.
