= Gross, Illinois =

- Unincorporated community
- Location within Illinois Location within the United States
- Coordinates: 37°31′59″N 88°17′26″W
- Country: United States
- State: Illinois
- County: Hardin
- Elevation: 646 ft (197 m)
- Time zone: UTC-6 (Central (CST))
  - Summer (DST): UTC-5 (CDT)
- Area code: 618
- GNIS feature ID: 424954

Gross is an unincorporated community in Hardin County, Illinois, United States. Gross is north of Elizabethtown.
