= Karbers Ridge, Illinois =

- Unincorporated community
- Location within Illinois Location within the United States
- Coordinates: 37°34′47″N 88°20′00″W
- Country: United States
- State: Illinois
- County: Hardin
- Elevation: 600 ft (180 m)
- Time zone: UTC-6 (Central (CST))
  - Summer (DST): UTC-5 (CDT)
- Area code: 618
- GNIS feature ID: 425071

Karbers Ridge is an unincorporated community in Hardin County, Illinois, United States. Karbers Ridge is north of Elizabethtown.
