= Shetlerville, Illinois =

- Unincorporated community
- Location within Illinois Location within the United States
- Coordinates: 37°25′50″N 88°24′27″W
- Country: United States
- State: Illinois
- County: Hardin
- Elevation: 440 ft (130 m)
- Time zone: UTC-6 (Central (CST))
  - Summer (DST): UTC-5 (CDT)
- Area code: 618
- GNIS feature ID: 425480

Shetlerville is an unincorporated community in Hardin County, Illinois, United States. Shetlerville is west of Rosiclare.
