= Karber =

Karber is a surname. Notable people with the surname include:

- G. T. Karber, American author
- James Karber (1914–1976), American lawyer, businessman, and politician
