= 2000 Illinois elections =

- November 7, 2000
- Turnout: 69.18%

Elections were held in Illinois on November 7, 2000.

Primaries were held on March 21, 2000.

== Election information ==
=== Turnout ===
==== Primary election ====
For the primary election, turnout was 25.91%, with 1,748,279 votes cast.

Turnout by county

County	Registration	Votes cast	Turnout
Adams	40,170	6,558	16.33%
Alexander	8,246	2,876	34.88%
Bond	9,779	2,945	30.12%
Boone	22,554	5,730	25.41%
Brown	3,607	1,178	32.66%
Bureau	24,511	6,835	27.89%
Calhoun	3,717	1,254	33.74%
Carroll	11,043	3,285	29.75%
Cass	9,719	2,385	24.54%
Champaign	107,085	33,851	31.61%
Christian	23,376	6,179	26.43%
Clark	12,010	1,588	13.22%
Clay	9,684	2,227	23%
Clinton	22,793	3,779	16.58%
Coles	28,328	5,065	17.88%
Cook (Note: For more on Cook County primary election turnout, see 2000 Cook County, Illinois elections#Primary election)	2,605,692	736,470	28.26%
Crawford	14,337	2,406	16.78%
Cumberland	8,555	2,057	24.04%
DeKalb	47,874	10,359	21.64%
DeWitt	11,056	3,392	30.68%
Douglas	11,710	4,839	41.32%
DuPage	475,706	129,570	27.24%
Edgar	12,568	3,002	23.89%
Edwards	5,098	1,690	33.15%
Effingham	19,956	6,492	32.53%
Fayette	13,723	4,172	30.4%
Ford	8,437	3,822	45.3%
Franklin	31,385	12,124	38.63%
Fulton	25,591	8,002	31.27%
Gallatin	4,913	3,040	61.88%
Greene	8,707	1,569	18.02%
Grundy	22,727	4,615	20.31%
Hamilton	6,003	2,301	38.33%
Hancock	13,918	2,948	21.18%
Hardin	3,906	2,332	59.7%
Henderson	5,325	1,170	21.97%
Henry	36,788	7,299	19.84%
Iroquois	19,135	6,382	33.35%
Jackson	52,872	4,703	8.9%
Jasper	6,609	1,155	17.48%
Jefferson	23,856	4,327	18.14%
Jersey	13,680	3,057	22.35%
Jo Daviess	13,993	4,320	30.87%
Johnson	7,956	3,096	38.91%
Kane	192,121	51,803	26.96%
Kankakee	56,274	12,818	22.78%
Kendall	31,340	8,787	28.04%
Knox	37,589	5,828	15.5%
Lake	324,839	84,163	25.91%
LaSalle	67,318	15,718	23.35%
Lawrence	10,369	3,409	32.88%
Lee	20,886	6,015	28.8%
Livingston	22,444	6,211	27.67%
Logan	18,486	7,737	41.85%
Macon	69,524	12,642	18.18%
Macoupin	34,180	8,512	24.9%
Madison	167,772	29,650	17.67%
Marion	29,676	4,668	15.73%
Marshall	8,486	1,838	21.66%
Mason	10,789	1,916	17.76%
Massac	11,899	4,422	37.16%
McDonough	21,101	5,799	27.48%
McHenry	152,943	46,344	30.3%
McLean	90,217	29,613	32.82%
Menard	8,964	2,532	28.25%
Mercer	12,297	3,766	30.63%
Monroe	19,262	1,737	9.02%
Montgomery	18,354	7,288	39.71%
Morgan	20,815	2,985	14.34%
Moultrie	8,598	2,322	27.01%
Ogle	31,836	11,387	35.77%
Peoria	112,234	23,493	20.93%
Perry	15,261	3,628	23.77%
Piatt	10,805	2,955	27.35%
Pike	12,303	3,680	29.91%
Pope	3,421	1,212	35.43%
Pulaski	6,135	1,162	18.94%
Putnam	4,381	2,252	51.4%
Randolph	23,702	5,079	21.43%
Richland	13,499	1,422	10.53%
Rock Island	97,348	21,302	21.88%
Saline	19,068	6,208	32.56%
Sangamon	126,050	25,131	19.94%
Schuyler	6,200	1,904	30.71%
Scott	3,915	626	15.99%
Shelby	15,678	5,165	32.94%
Stark	4,729	1,609	34.02%
St. Clair	155,393	27,555	17.73%
Stephenson	28,518	8,468	29.69%
Tazewell	87,497	16,245	18.57%
Union	12,994	6,208	47.78%
Vermilion	51,460	13,157	25.57%
Wabash	9,522	1,950	20.48%
Warren	12,056	2,229	18.49%
Washington	10,553	1,467	13.9%
Wayne	12,547	2,091	16.67%
White	11,512	3,125	27.15%
Whiteside	35,991	6,113	16.98%
Will	253,273	57,483	22.7%
Williamson	37,968	10,225	26.93%
Winnebago	160,499	33,164	20.66%
Woodford	24,965	5,615	22.49%
Total	6,746,554	1,748,279	25.91%

==== General election ====
For the general election, turnout was 69.18%, with 4,932,192 votes cast.

Turnout by county

County	Registration	Votes cast	Turnout%
Adams	39,989	30,892	77.25%
Alexander	7,740	4,286	55.37%
Bond	10,408	7,380	70.91%
Boone	24,260	15,972	65.84%
Brown	3,731	2,734	73.28%
Bureau	25,248	17,319	68.6%
Calhoun	3,778	2,692	71.25%
Carroll	11,375	7,383	64.91%
Cass	9,924	6,083	61.3%
Champaign	120,757	75,610	62.61%
Christian	24,242	15,121	62.38%
Clark	12,310	7,700	62.55%
Clay	9,877	6,324	64.03%
Clinton	23,917	15,956	66.71%
Coles	30,142	20,580	68.28%
Cook (Note: For more on Cook County general election turnout, see 2000 Cook County, Illinois elections#General election)	2,781,474	1,988,821	71.5%
Crawford	14,774	8,767	59.34%
Cumberland	8,716	5,159	59.19%
DeKalb	49,267	33,345	67.68%
DeWitt	11,492	7,285	63.39%
Douglas	12,340	8,233	66.72%
DuPage	482,789	369,300	76.49%
Edgar	12,870	8,499	66.04%
Edwards	5,181	3,420	66.01%
Effingham	20,986	14,918	71.09%
Fayette	14,114	9,651	68.38%
Ford	8,827	6,326	71.67%
Franklin	30,764	19,420	63.13%
Fulton	26,319	16,845	64%
Gallatin	4,950	3,691	74.57%
Greene	8,952	5,987	66.88%
Grundy	24,020	16,926	70.47%
Hamilton	6,210	4,757	76.6%
Hancock	14,205	9,996	70.37%
Hardin	3,894	2,893	74.29%
Henderson	5,483	3,991	72.79%
Henry	37,374	24,082	64.44%
Iroquois	18,701	13,775	73.66%
Jackson	53,629	23,629	44.06%
Jasper	6,844	5,066	74.02%
Jefferson	24,892	15,785	63.41%
Jersey	14,661	9,696	66.13%
Jo Daviess	14,801	10,661	72.03%
Johnson	8,215	5,579	67.91%
Kane	210,118	144,187	68.62%
Kankakee	55,444	41,092	74.11%
Kendall	33,885	23,253	68.62%
Knox	38,924	24,404	62.7%
Lake	350,673	246,706	70.35%
LaSalle	70,322	47,413	67.42%
Lawrence	10,556	6,822	64.63%
Lee	21,902	15,074	68.82%
Livingston	21,744	15,873	73%
Logan	19,607	13,598	69.35%
Macon	74,101	50,960	68.77%
Macoupin	35,229	21,835	61.98%
Madison	173,544	111,717	64.37%
Marion	31,228	17,270	55.3%
Marshall	8,804	6,102	69.31%
Mason	11,107	6,956	62.63%
Massac	12,274	7,030	57.28%
McDonough	22,569	13,097	58.03%
McHenry	161,637	106,528	65.91%
McLean	99,044	62,372	62.97%
Menard	7,902	6,309	79.84%
Mercer	12,783	8,536	66.78%
Monroe	20,244	14,244	70.36%
Montgomery	21,539	13,510	62.72%
Morgan	21,370	14,832	69.41%
Moultrie	9,379	5,894	62.84%
Ogle	33,530	21,144	63.06%
Peoria	123,969	79,230	63.91%
Perry	15,560	10,306	66.23%
Piatt	11,411	8,606	75.42%
Pike	12,441	8,392	67.45%
Pope	3,578	2,434	68.03%
Pulaski	6,942	3,260	46.96%
Putnam	4,498	3,275	72.81%
Randolph	24,413	15,173	62.15%
Richland	11,398	7,652	67.13%
Rock Island	103,667	66,677	64.32%
Saline	19,577	12,046	61.53%
Sangamon	122,502	93,492	76.32%
Schuyler	6,298	3,804	60.4%
Scott	3,749	2,561	68.31%
Shelby	16,065	10,495	65.33%
Stark	4,476	3,076	68.72%
St. Clair	164,993	104,663	63.43%
Stephenson	30,059	20,146	67.02%
Tazewell	90,264	59,796	66.25%
Union	15,250	8,953	58.71%
Vermilion	52,636	33,223	63.12%
Wabash	9,731	5,671	58.28%
Warren	12,417	7,885	63.5%
Washington	10,986	7,375	67.13%
Wayne	12,909	7,977	61.79%
White	11,762	7,932	67.44%
Whiteside	37,748	25,650	67.95%
Will	277,862	196,542	70.73%
Williamson	40,266	27,949	69.41%
Winnebago	171,589	111,571	65.02%
Woodford	26,109	17,087	65.44%
Total	7,129,026	4,932,192	69.18%

== Federal elections ==
=== United States president ===
Illinois voted for the Democratic ticket of Al Gore and Joe Lieberman.

=== United States House ===
All 20 of Illinois' seats in the United States House of Representatives were up for election in 2000.

No seats switched parties, with the composition of Illinois' House delegation remaining 10 Democrats and 10 Republicans.

== State elections ==
=== State Senate ===
2000 Illinois Senate election
- November 7, 2000

21 of 59 seats in the Illinois Senate 30 seats needed for a majority
	Majority party	Minority party
Party	Republican	Democratic
Last election	32	27
Seats won	32	27
Seat change	Steady	Steady
- Results: Republican hold Democratic hold No election
President before election
James Philip
Republican
Elected President
James Philip
Republican

21 out of 59 seats in the Illinois Senate were up for election in 2000. Republicans retained control of the chamber.

=== State House of Representatives ===
2000 Illinois House of Representatives election
- November 7, 2000

All 118 seats in the Illinois House of Representatives 60 seats needed for a majority
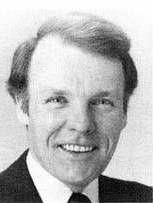

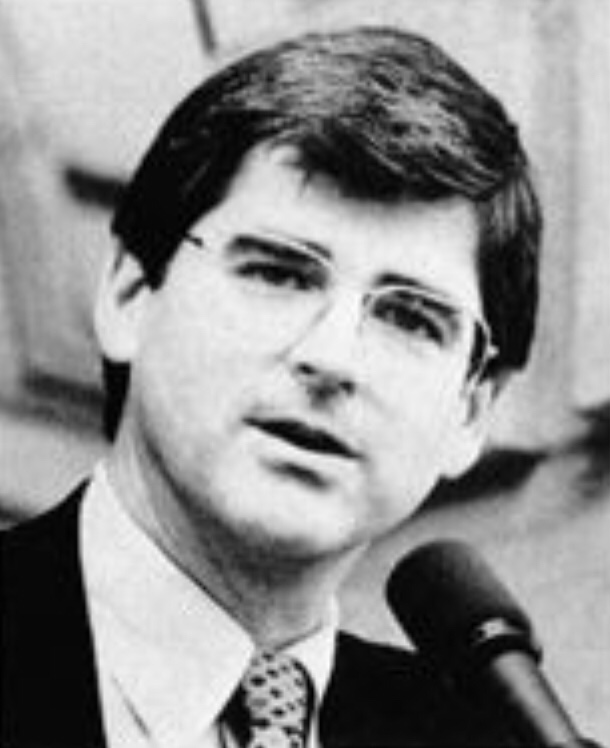
	Majority party	Minority party
Leader	Michael Madigan	Lee Daniels
Party	Democratic	Republican
Leader's seat	22nd	46th
Last election	62	56
Seats won	62	56
Seat change	Steady	Steady
- Results: Democratic hold Republican hold
Speaker before election
Michael Madigan
Democratic
Speaker-Elect
Michael Madigan
Democratic

All of the seats in the Illinois House of Representatives were up for election in 2000. Democrats retained control of the chamber.

- Illinois House of Representatives elections, 2000 at Ballotpedia

=== Judicial elections ===
Judicial elections were held.

== Local elections ==
Local elections were held. These included county elections, such as the Cook County elections.
