= Hardin County Courthouse (Illinois) =

Local government building in the United States

Coordinates: 37°26′50″N 88°18′18″W

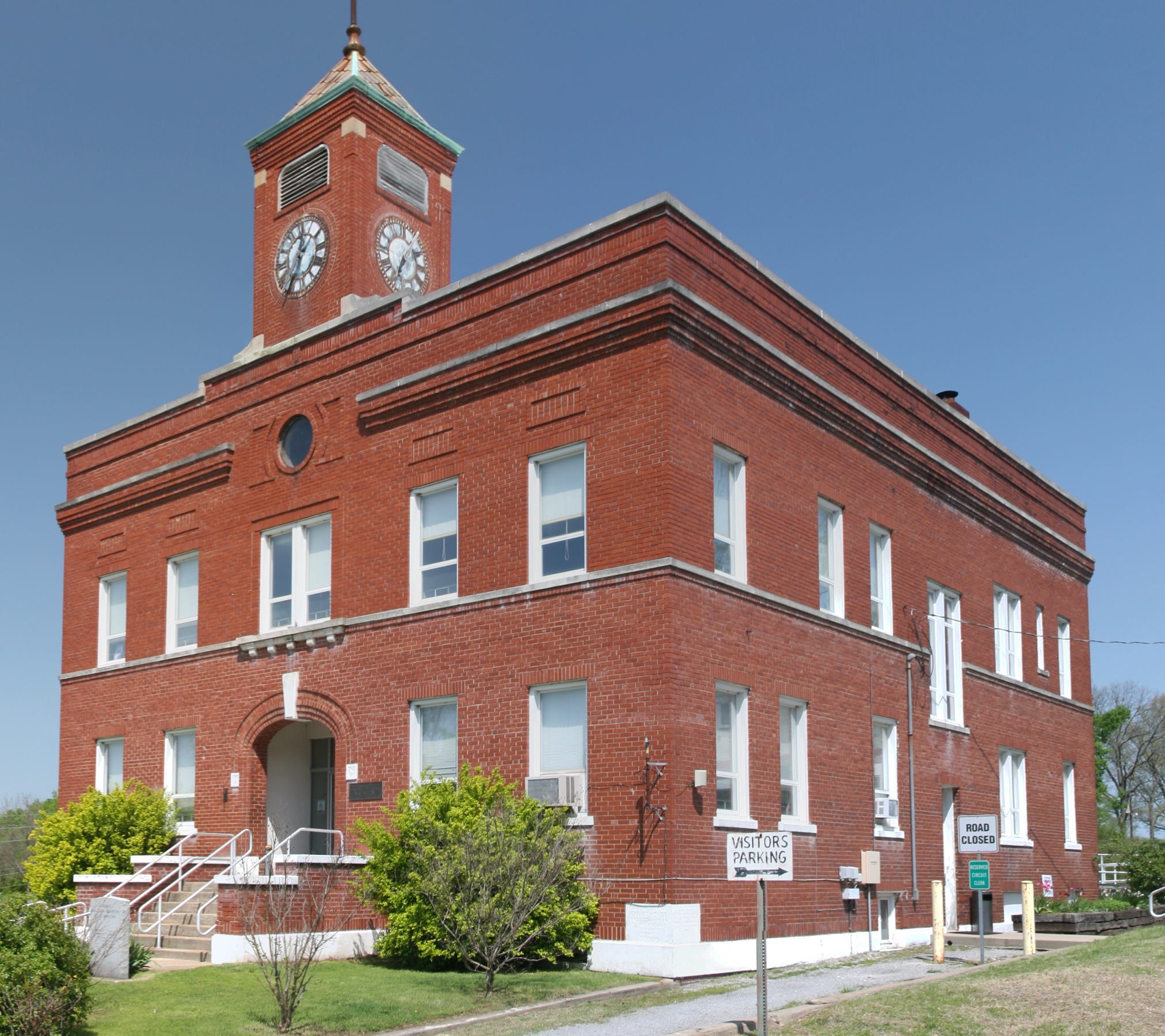
Front and eastern side of the courthouse

The Hardin County Courthouse is a government building in Elizabethtown, the county seat of Hardin County, Illinois, United States. Built in 1927, it is the fourth building to serve this purpose in Hardin County, following three that were replaced due to fires or fire-related concerns.

== History ==
As late as the beginning of the 19th century, today's Hardin County was a debatable and deserted land; the advance of civilization was held back by perennial conflict among the Indians of the region; the earliest residents of the county were squatters, as no land offices existed in the area until one was opened at Shawneetown in 1814. Even after the opening of the land office, surveying was limited, and the area's first firm county boundaries were enacted upon the formation of Hardin County in 1839.

The county's obscure first courthouse was a wooden building, and the danger of fire prompted its replacement with a fire-resistant brick structure. However, this building burned in 1884, and most of the county's early records (including documentation from the first courthouse) were destroyed in the fire. The architectural plans for this second courthouse survived, however, and the third courthouse merely reused the second building's design. It also shared the second building's fate, being destroyed by a 1921 fire. Hardin County being a poor region, the fourth courthouse took nearly six years to complete, and the project would have been delayed further without the underwriting of large bonds or the intervention of a contractor willing to work for little more than his expenses in order to finish the courthouse.

== Architecture ==
Built with largely rectangular windows, the building features a small clock tower atop the two-story facade. A belt course of overhanging bricks sits just below the roof's edge. The main entrance is set at the top of a slight flight of steps and placed within a large archway. Near the base of the steps stands a large war memorial.
