= Finneyville, Illinois =

- Unincorporated community
- Location within Illinois Location within the United States
- Coordinates: 37°32′40″N 88°06′19″W
- Country: United States
- State: Illinois
- County: Hardin
- Elevation: 499 ft (152 m)
- Time zone: UTC-6 (Central (CST))
  - Summer (DST): UTC-5 (CDT)
- Area code: 618
- GNIS feature ID: 422698

Finneyville is an unincorporated community in Hardin County, Illinois, United States. Finneyville is near the Ohio River in eastern Hardin County.
