= Elizabethtown =

Elizabethtown, Elizabeth Town, or similar may refer to:

== Places ==
- Elizabeth Town, Tasmania, Australia
- Brockville, Ontario, Canada; formerly named Elizabethtown
- Erzsébetváros or Elizabethtown, the 7th district of Budapest, Hungary

=== United States ===
- Elizabethtown, California
- Elizabethtown, Illinois
- Elizabethtown, Bartholomew County, Indiana
- Elizabethtown, Delaware County, Indiana
- Elizabethtown, Kentucky, inspired a film (see below)
- Elizabethtown, New York
- Elizabethtown (CDP), New York, in Essex County, NY
- Elizabethtown, Herkimer County, New York
- Elizabeth, New Jersey, formerly named Elizabethtown
- Elizabethtown, New Mexico
- Elizabethtown, North Carolina
- Elizabethtown, Ohio
- Elizabethtown, Guernsey County, Ohio
- Elizabethtown, Pennsylvania
  - Elizabethtown College
  - Elizabethtown (Amtrak station)
- Elizabethton, Tennessee, which is pronounced and spelled -ton rather than -town
- Elizabethtown, Texas
- Moundsville, West Virginia, formerly named Elizabethtown

== Other uses ==
- Elizabeth Towne (1865–1960), New Thought writer and The Nautilus magazine editor
- Elizabethtown (film), a 2005 film starring Orlando Bloom and Kirsten Dunst
  - Elizabethtown (soundtrack), the soundtrack for the film

== See also ==
- Elizabeth (disambiguation)
