= Cadiz, Illinois =

- Unincorporated community
- Location within Illinois Location within the United States
- Coordinates: 37°34′45″N 88°13′35″W
- Country: United States
- State: Illinois
- County: Hardin
- Elevation: 561 ft (171 m)
- Time zone: UTC-6 (Central (CST))
  - Summer (DST): UTC-5 (CDT)
- Area code: 618
- GNIS feature ID: 424698

Cadiz is an unincorporated community in Hardin County, Illinois, United States. Cadiz is north of Cave-in-Rock.
