= Patrick Levar =

American politician (born 1951)

Patrick Levar (born c. 1951) is the former alderman of the 45th ward of the City of Chicago.

== Early life ==
Levar is a graduate of St. Patrick's High School (1969) and Northeastern Illinois University (1973). Before becoming Alderman Levar worked as an assistant to the Clerk of the Circuit Court of Cook County from 1974 until 1987.

== Alderman ==
Levar was one of the so-called "Vrdolyak 29" opponents to Mayor Harold Washington.

Levar controlled three political action committees: Citizens to Re-elect Patrick J Levar, the 45th Ward Regular Democratic Organization, and the Patrick J Levar 45th Ward Committeeman Fund.

Alderman Levar was Chairman of the Committee on Aviation of the Chicago City Council. Levar was chairman of the Aviation Committee since the early 1990s, while his brother Michael was a top city official in charge of O'Hare International Airport construction contracts until Michael retired from his city job in 2004. Michael Levar was a focus of a massive investigation of city aviation deals looking into possible women- and minority-owned business fraud and into campaign contributions from airport contractors to Alderman Levar.

Levar unsuccessfully sought the Democratic nomination for Clerk of the Circuit Court of Cook County in 2000.
