= Rose Hotel (Elizabethtown, Illinois) =

- U.S. National Register of Historic Places
- Illinois State Historic Site
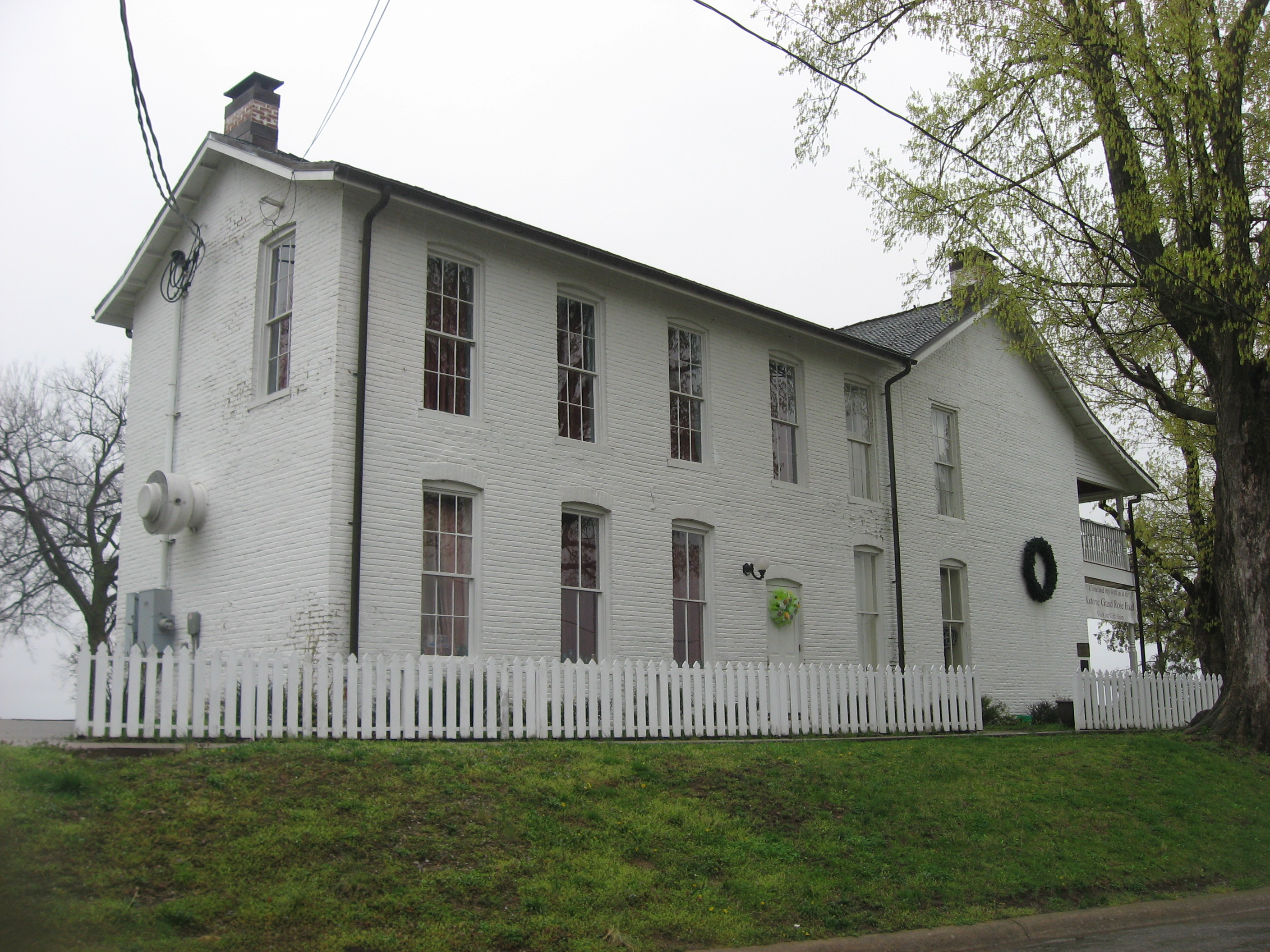
- Western side

- Location within Illinois Location within the United States
- Location: Main St., Elizabethtown, Illinois
- Coordinates: 37°26′43″N 88°18′16″W
- Area: Less than 1 acre (0.40 ha)
- Built: 1812
- Architect: James McFarland
- Architectural style: Georgian
- NRHP reference No.: 72000461
- Added to NRHP: December 26, 1972

The Rose Hotel is a historic site owned by the U.S. state of Illinois. It is located in Elizabethtown, Illinois, on the banks of the Ohio River. The oldest wing of the hotel was built in 1812 by James McFarland. It is one of the oldest structures in Illinois.

The earliest portion of the Rose Hotel was built in 1812, and an east addition was constructed in 1848. In the years following the Civil War, a rear dining room and a covered, two-story porch and stairway were added. In 1882, a pavilion called the "summer house" was built on the edge of the bluff in front of the hotel.

In 1891, Sarah Rose Baker, a widow who had worked at the hotel for seven years, purchased the hotel from the McFarlan family. The hotel passed to daughter Charlotte Rose Gullet upon Sarah Rose's death in 1939 and remained in the Gullet family until the state of Illinois purchased the property in 1988. A large restoration project was complete in 2000, and the hotel opened again for business.

The hotel is currently leased by the Illinois Historic Preservation Agency to a private-sector operator, Sandy Vineyard, who maintains the structure as a bed and breakfast. The exterior is restored to its 1889 appearance.
