= Saline Landing, Illinois =

- Unincorporated community
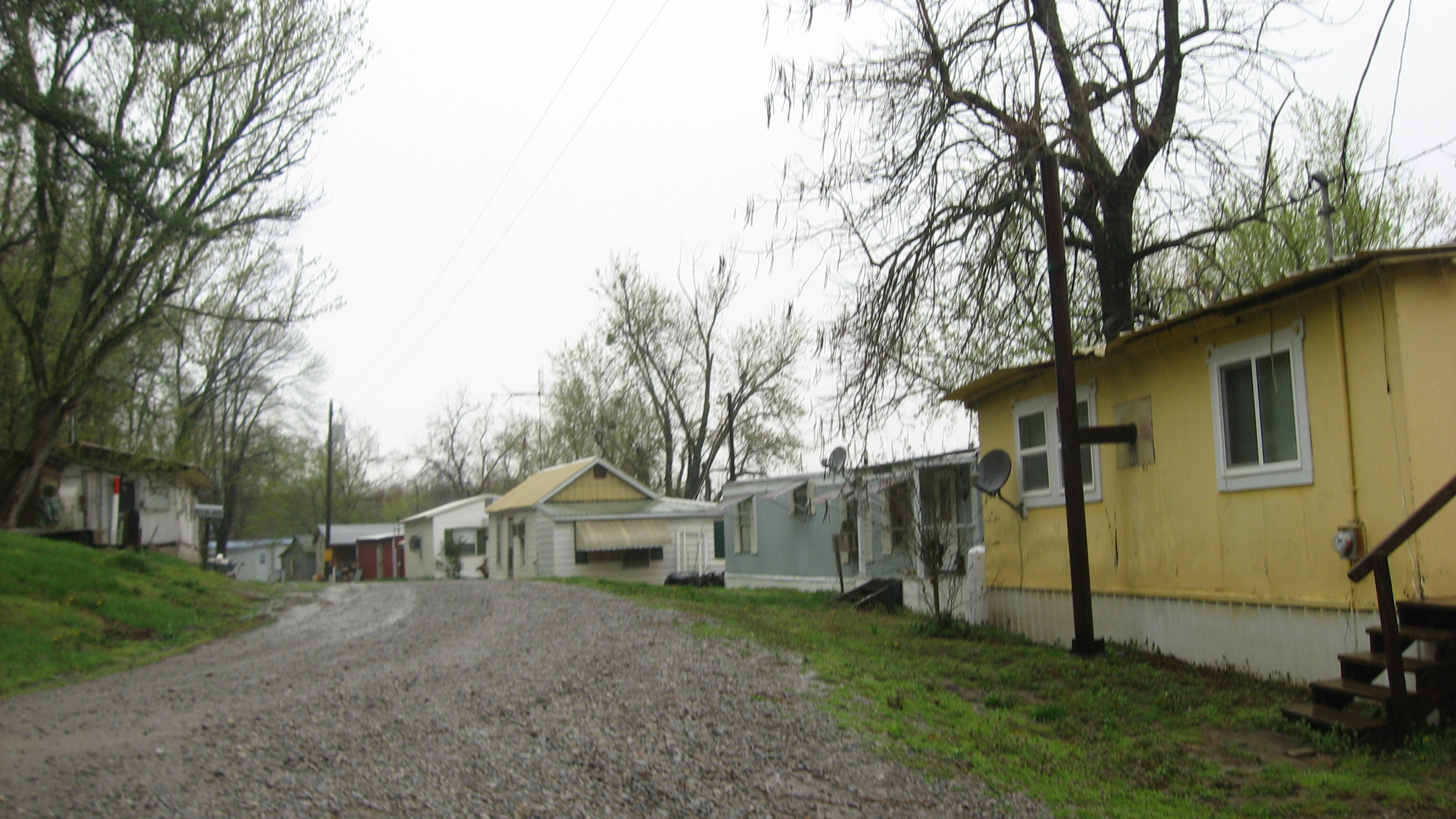
- The community's main street

- Location within Illinois Location within the United States
- Coordinates: 37°34′12″N 88°07′49″W
- Country: United States
- State: Illinois
- County: Hardin
- Elevation: 381 ft (116 m)
- Time zone: UTC-6 (Central (CST))
  - Summer (DST): UTC-5 (CDT)
- Area code: 618
- GNIS feature ID: 425440

Saline Landing is an unincorporated community in northeast Hardin County, Illinois, United States. Saline Landing is located on the Ohio River at the mouth of the Saline River.

It is adjacent to Saline Island which is listed on the National Register of Historic Places.
