= Eichorn, Illinois =

- Unincorporated community
- Location within Illinois Location within the United States
- Coordinates: 37°29′28″N 88°24′19″W
- Country: United States
- State: Illinois
- County: Hardin
- Elevation: 423 ft (129 m)
- Time zone: UTC-6 (Central (CST))
  - Summer (DST): UTC-5 (CDT)
- Area code: 618
- GNIS feature ID: 424867

Eichorn is an unincorporated community in Hardin County, Illinois, United States. Eichorn is located on Illinois Route 34, northwest of Rosiclare.

The community bears the name of Martin Eichorn, a German settler who owned a general store with a post office. The postal service requested a name for the town so Eichorn was picked for the name.
