= Saline Island (Kentucky) =

- U.S. National Register of Historic Places
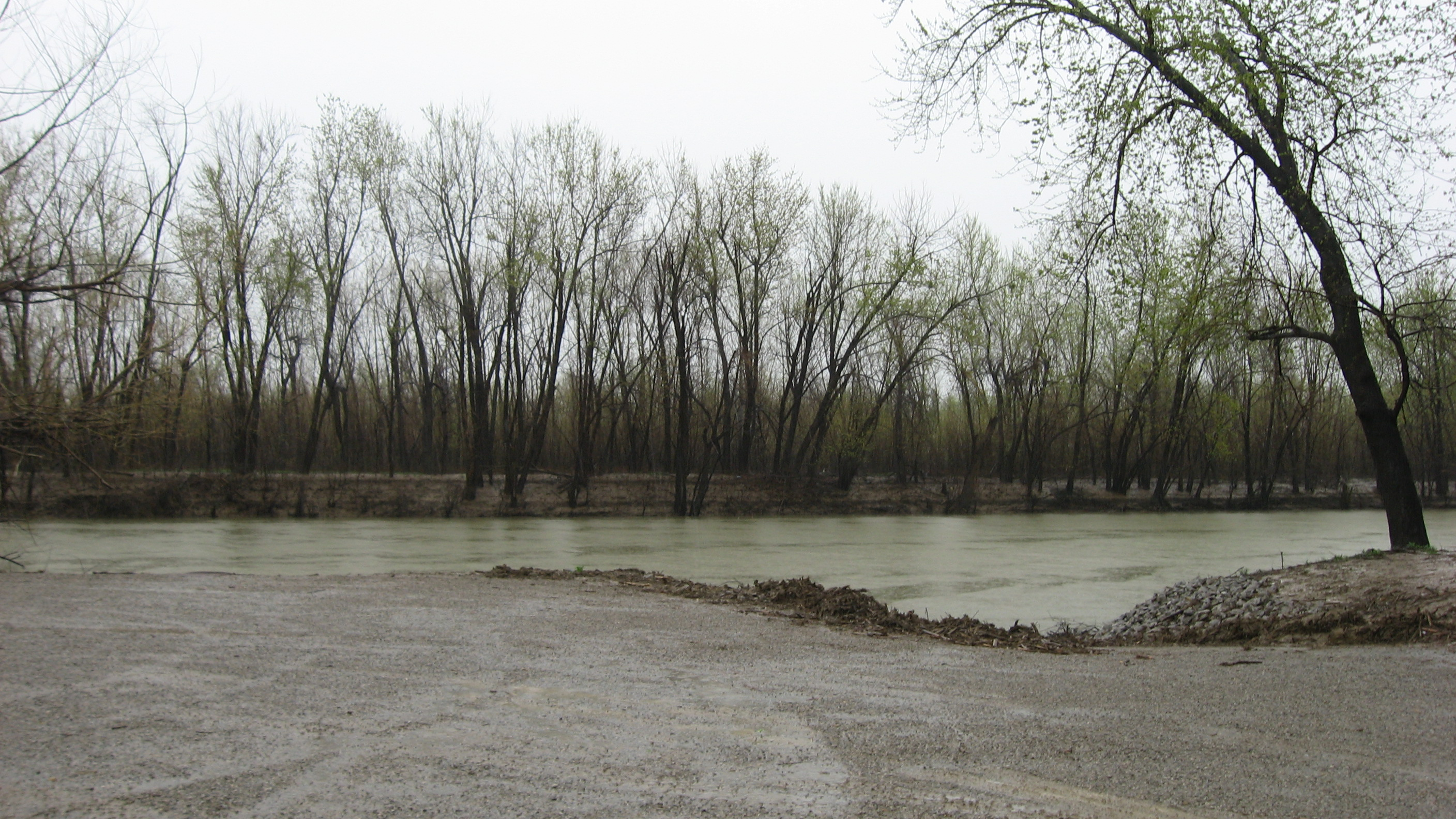

- Location within Kentucky Location within the United States
- Nearest city: Saline Mines, Kentucky
- Coordinates: 37°34′49″N 88°08′02″W
- Area: 200 acres (81 ha)
- Built: 1864
- MPS: Caught in the Middle: The Civil War on the Lower Ohio River MPS
- NRHP reference No.: 98001291
- Added to NRHP: October 30, 1998

Saline Island, also known as Johnson Island, in the Ohio River near Saline Landing, Illinois, has historical significance in 1862 and 1864 during the American Civil War when it was used for incursion into Illinois. It was listed on the National Register of Historic Places in 1998.

It is located at the confluence of the Saline River with the Ohio River, at miles 865-67 of the latter, on the Illinois side of the river, but the island is part of Kentucky.
