= James Karber =

American lawyer, businessman, and politician

Member of the Illinois House of Representatives
- In office 1947–1951

Personal details
- Born: James Winfield Karber; July 8, 1914 Elizabethtown, Illinois, U.S.
- Died: September 2, 1976 (aged 62) Evansville, Indiana, U.S.
- Party: Democratic
- Occupation: Politician, lawyer, businessman

James Winfield Karber (July 8, 1914 – September 2, 1976) was an American lawyer, businessman, and politician.

Karber was born in Elizabethtown, Illinois. He went to the Ridgway Community High School in Ridgway, Illinois. Karber received his bachelor's and law degrees from University of Illinois. He was admitted to the Illinois bar in 1936. Karber also served as an ordained Baptist minister. He served as state's attorney for Gallatin County, Illinois and was involved with the Democratic Party. Karber was involve with the Gallatin County Bank in Ridgway, Illinois, and the oil industry. He was a farmer. Karber served in the Illinois House of Representatives from 1947 to 1951. From 1961 to 1969, Karber served on the Illinois Commerce Commission and served as chair of the commission. Karber died at Welborn Baptist Hospital in Evansville, Indiana after suffering a heart attack at his home in Ridgway, Illinois.
