= Elizabethtown, Delaware County, Indiana =

Elizabethtown, Delaware County
- Location of Washington Township in Delaware County
- Coordinates: 40°22′29″N 85°27′40″W
- Country: United States
- State: Indiana
- County: Delaware

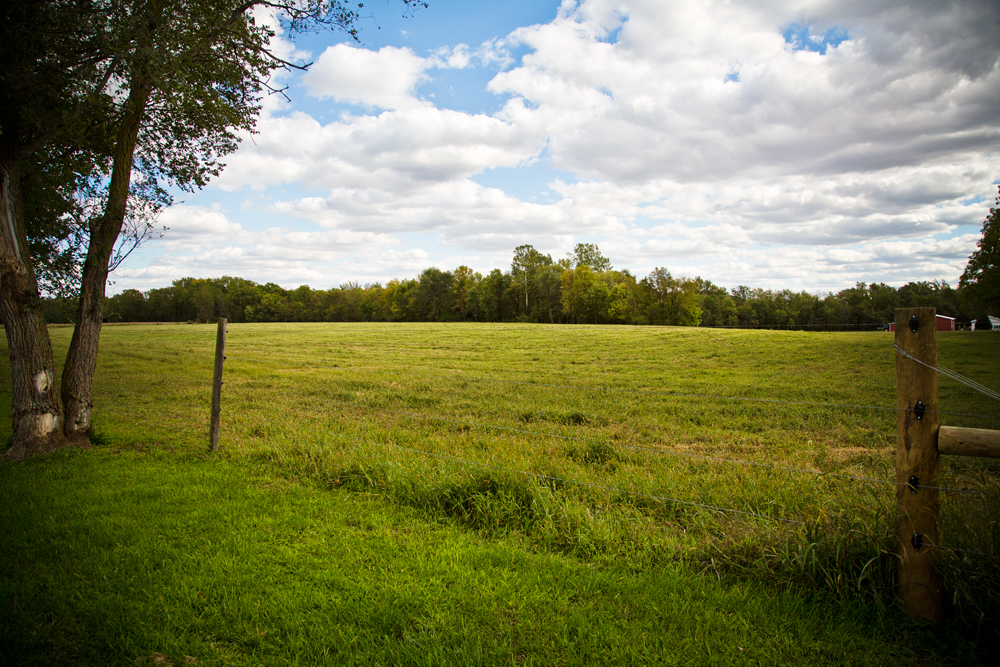
Current view of Elizabethtown.

Elizabethtown was a small, now extinct town in Washington Township, Delaware County, Indiana, United States. The town was platted in the early 19th century and was located along the north bank of the Mississinewa river in section 12, of Washington Township, in Delaware County, Indiana.

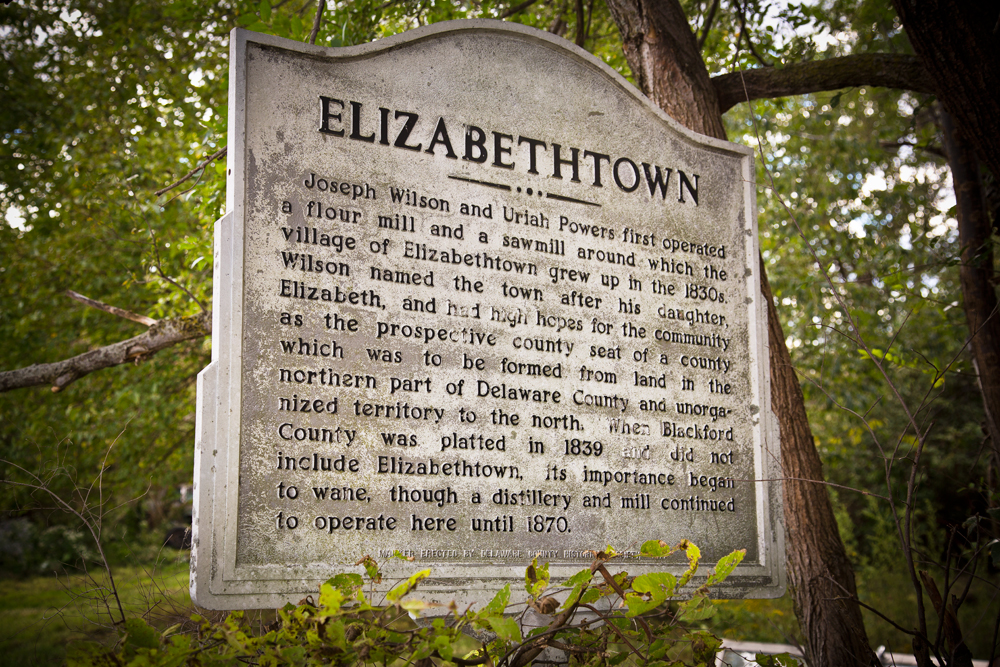
DCHS Marker

== History ==
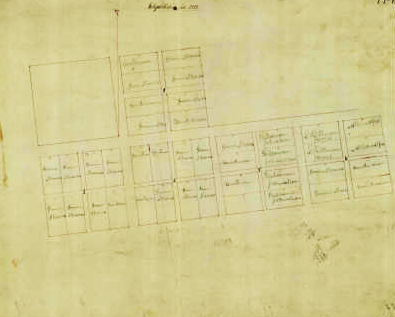
Early plat map.

The town was platted in the early 1800s by Joseph Wilson and named in honor of his daughter, Elizabeth Wilson. The town's central economic activity was centered on a flour mill and a saw mill. The town's inhabitants had hoped for the village to become the county seat of either Blackford or Delaware County. Blackford County chose Hartford City and Delaware county chose Muncie. The town slowly declined in the middle of the 19th century and ceased to exist at the beginning of the 20th. The only existing remnant of the town is the adjacent Elizabethtown Cemetery.

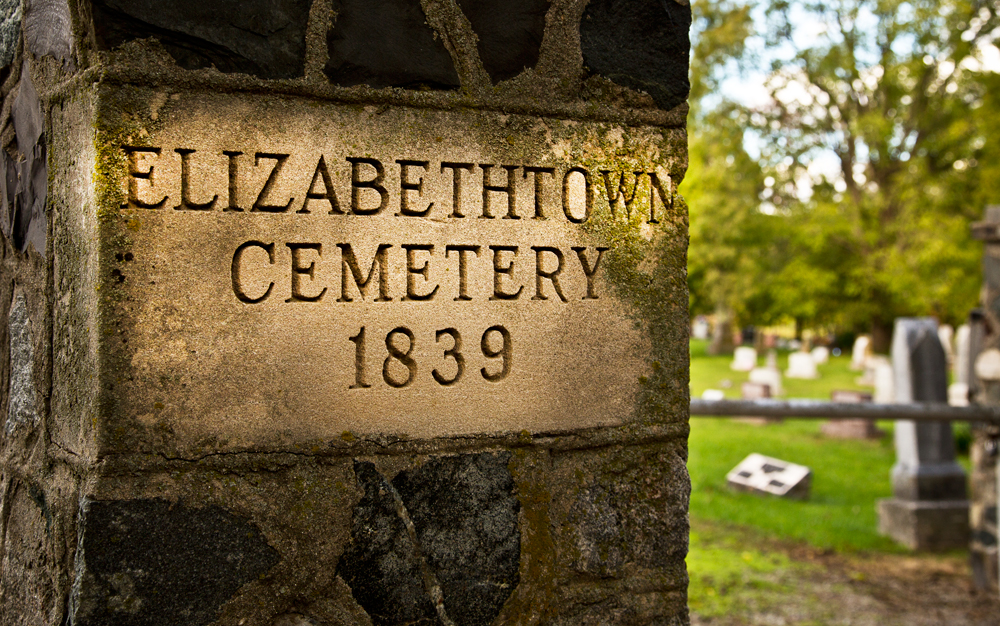
Cemetery gate.

== Geography ==
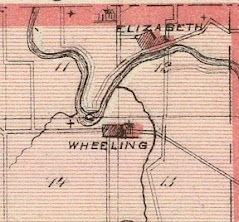
Hand drawn map.

Elizabethtown was located at 40°22'29.12" North, -85°27'40.34" West (40.374091,-85.461258). Currently a farm field, the town was located just north of the bend in the Mississinewa River.
