= Rosiclare, Illinois =

- City
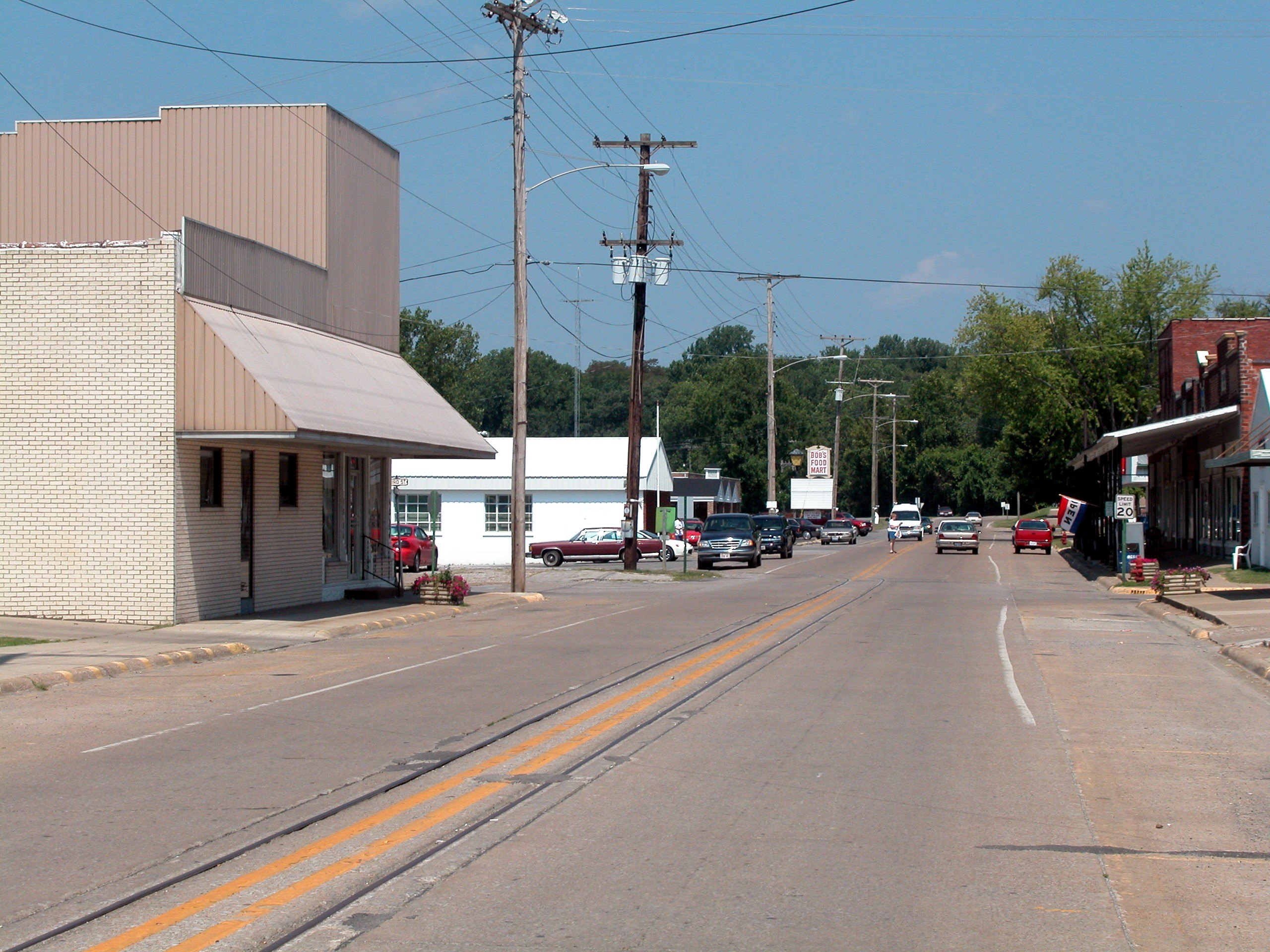
- Rosiclare in 2003

- Logo
- Motto: "Where the Hills and the River meet"
- Location of Rosiclare in Hardin County, Illinois.
- Coordinates: 37°25′27″N 88°21′00″W
- Country: United States
- State: Illinois
- County: Hardin

Area
  - Total: 2.12 sq mi (5.48 km^{2})
  - Land: 1.94 sq mi (5.02 km^{2})
  - Water: 0.18 sq mi (0.46 km^{2})
- Elevation: 367 ft (112 m)

Population (2020)
  - Total: 980
  - Density: 505.5/sq mi (195.18/km^{2})
- Time zone: UTC-6 (CST)
  - Summer (DST): UTC-5 (CDT)
- ZIP code: 62982
- Area code: 618
- FIPS code: 17-65897
- GNIS feature ID: 2396436
- Website: www.cityofrosiclare.com

Rosiclare is a city in Hardin County, Illinois. It is located along the Ohio River. The population was 980 at the 2020 census.

== History ==
Some of the earliest settlers of the Rosiclare area were outlaws mainly counterfeiters from the Sturdivant Gang in the late 1810s-early 1820s. Rosiclare used to be the "Fluorspar Capital of the World". Andrew Jackson, in 1835, once owned a fluorspar mine in Rosiclare. Wholesale mining of fluorspar first began in Rosiclare in 1842. Mining ceased when it became cheaper to import fluorite from China. The Lead and Fluorspar Mining Company continued to process ore from mines in Hardin County but closed due to foreign competition in 1996.

== Geography ==
Rosiclare is located in southwestern Hardin County and is bordered to the southeast by the Ohio River, which forms the state boundary with Kentucky. Illinois Route 34 terminates in Rosiclare at the river and leads north 30 miles (48 km) to Harrisburg. The next Illinois community upriver (northeast) is Elizabethtown, 4.5 miles (7.2 km) via IL-34 and IL-146 or 2.5 miles (4.0 km) by river, while the next one downstream (southwest) is Golconda, 15 miles (24 km) via IL-146 or 11 miles (18 km) by river.

According to the 2021 census gazetteer files, Rosiclare has a total area of 2.12 square miles (5.49 km^{2}), of which 1.94 square miles (5.02 km^{2}) (or 91.59%) is land and 0.18 square miles (0.47 km^{2}) (or 8.41%) is water.

=== Climate ===
Climate data for Rosiclare 5NW, Illinois (1991–2020 normals, extremes 1968–present)
Month	Jan	Feb	Mar	Apr	May	Jun	Jul	Aug	Sep	Oct	Nov	Dec	Year
Record high °F (°C)	72 (22)	77 (25)	85 (29)	90 (32)	92 (33)	107 (42)	106 (41)	104 (40)	100 (38)	94 (34)	84 (29)	76 (24)	107 (42)
Mean daily maximum °F (°C)	41.2 (5.1)	46.2 (7.9)	56.3 (13.5)	67.6 (19.8)	75.2 (24.0)	83.0 (28.3)	86.4 (30.2)	86.1 (30.1)	80.4 (26.9)	69.2 (20.7)	55.9 (13.3)	45.2 (7.3)	66.1 (18.9)
Daily mean °F (°C)	31.8 (−0.1)	35.7 (2.1)	44.8 (7.1)	55.1 (12.8)	63.9 (17.7)	72.3 (22.4)	75.8 (24.3)	74.5 (23.6)	67.8 (19.9)	56.0 (13.3)	44.6 (7.0)	35.8 (2.1)	54.8 (12.7)
Mean daily minimum °F (°C)	22.4 (−5.3)	25.1 (−3.8)	33.3 (0.7)	42.6 (5.9)	52.6 (11.4)	61.5 (16.4)	65.2 (18.4)	63.0 (17.2)	55.1 (12.8)	42.9 (6.1)	33.4 (0.8)	26.3 (−3.2)	43.6 (6.4)
Record low °F (°C)	−22 (−30)	−12 (−24)	−5 (−21)	16 (−9)	24 (−4)	39 (4)	42 (6)	36 (2)	32 (0)	18 (−8)	3 (−16)	−17 (−27)	−22 (−30)
Average precipitation inches (mm)	3.90 (99)	3.71 (94)	5.08 (129)	5.12 (130)	5.35 (136)	4.61 (117)	4.40 (112)	3.24 (82)	3.24 (82)	3.57 (91)	4.23 (107)	4.44 (113)	50.89 (1,293)
Average snowfall inches (cm)	0.9 (2.3)	1.4 (3.6)	0.2 (0.51)	0.0 (0.0)	0.0 (0.0)	0.0 (0.0)	0.0 (0.0)	0.0 (0.0)	0.0 (0.0)	0.2 (0.51)	0.0 (0.0)	0.6 (1.5)	3.3 (8.4)
Average precipitation days (≥ 0.01 in)	9.5	9.0	11.5	10.5	11.0	8.9	9.0	7.4	6.7	7.6	8.6	10.0	109.7
Average snowy days (≥ 0.1 in)	0.6	0.5	0.2	0.0	0.0	0.0	0.0	0.0	0.0	0.1	0.0	0.5	1.9
Source: NOAA

== Demographics ==
Historical population
Census	Pop.	Note	%±
1880	368		—
1890	274		−25.5%
1900	278		1.5%
1910	609		119.1%
1920	1,522		149.9%
1930	1,794		17.9%
1940	1,774		−1.1%
1950	2,086		17.6%
1960	1,700		−18.5%
1970	1,421		−16.4%
1980	1,441		1.4%
1990	1,378		−4.4%
2000	1,213		−12.0%
2010	1,160		−4.4%
2020	980		−15.5%
U.S. Decennial Census

As of the 2020 census there were 980 people, 354 households, and 241 families residing in the city. The population density was 462.92 inhabitants per square mile (178.73/km^{2}). There were 544 housing units at an average density of 256.97 per square mile (99.22/km^{2}). The racial makeup of the city was 93.47% White, 1.02% African American, 0.00% Native American, 0.61% Asian, 0.20% Pacific Islander, 0.20% from other races, and 4.49% from two or more races. Hispanic or Latino of any race were 2.45% of the population.

There were 354 households, out of which 28.8% had children under the age of 18 living with them, 54.80% were married couples living together, 11.02% had a female householder with no husband present, and 31.92% were non-families. 28.53% of all households were made up of individuals, and 11.58% had someone living alone who was 65 years of age or older. The average household size was 3.51 and the average family size was 2.82.

The city's age distribution consisted of 17.5% under the age of 18, 5.7% from 18 to 24, 20% from 25 to 44, 47.5% from 45 to 64, and 9.2% who were 65 years of age or older. The median age was 49.1 years. For every 100 females, there were 120.8 males. For every 100 females age 18 and over, there were 145.2 males.

The median income for a household in the city was $38,750, and the median income for a family was $55,208. Males had a median income of $41,402 versus $16,548 for females. The per capita income for the city was $18,838. About 12.4% of families and 17.1% of the population were below the poverty line, including 28.7% of those under age 18 and 13.8% of those age 65 or over.

== Notable people ==
- Jennifer Rhodes, television and film actress
- The Sturdivant Gang, 19th century counterfeiters

== See also ==
- List of cities and towns along the Ohio River
