= Elizabethtown, Illinois =

- Village
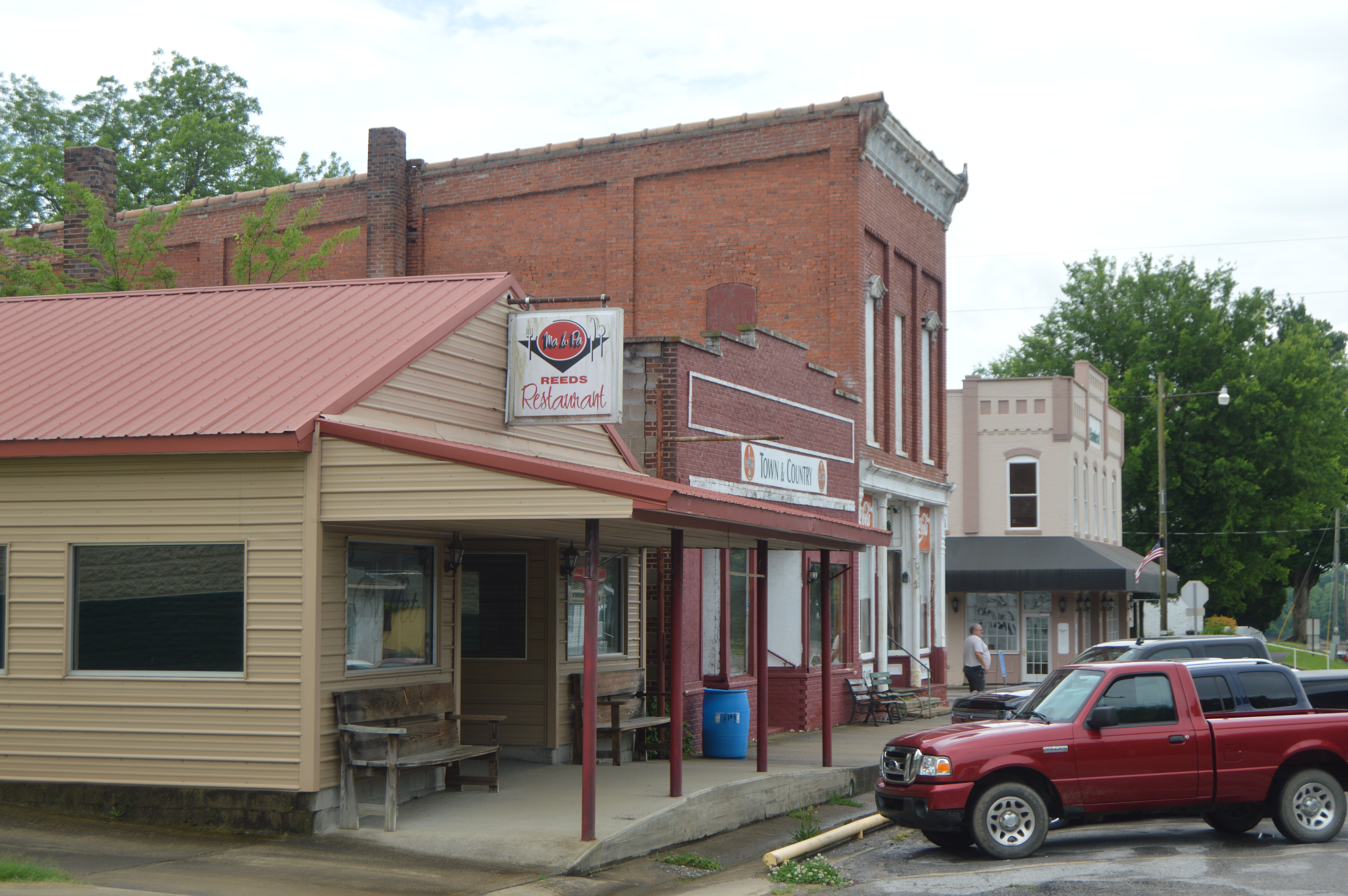
- Main Street

- Logo
- Motto: "Home of The Cougars"
- Interactive map of Elizabethtown, Illinois
- Location within Illinois Location within the United States
- Coordinates: 37°27′00″N 88°18′19″W
- Country: United States
- State: Illinois
- County: Hardin

Area
  - Total: 0.71 sq mi (1.84 km^{2})
  - Land: 0.71 sq mi (1.83 km^{2})
  - Water: 0.0039 sq mi (0.01 km^{2})
- Elevation: 367 ft (112 m)

Population (2020)
  - Total: 220
  - Density: 311.9/sq mi (120.41/km^{2})
- Time zone: UTC-6 (CST)
  - Summer (DST): UTC-5 (CDT)
- ZIP code: 62931
- Area code: 618
- FIPS code: 17-23191
- GNIS ID: 2398801

Elizabethtown is a village in and the county seat of Hardin County, Illinois, United States, along the Ohio River. The population was 220 at the 2020 census. It is the smallest county seat in the state.

== History ==
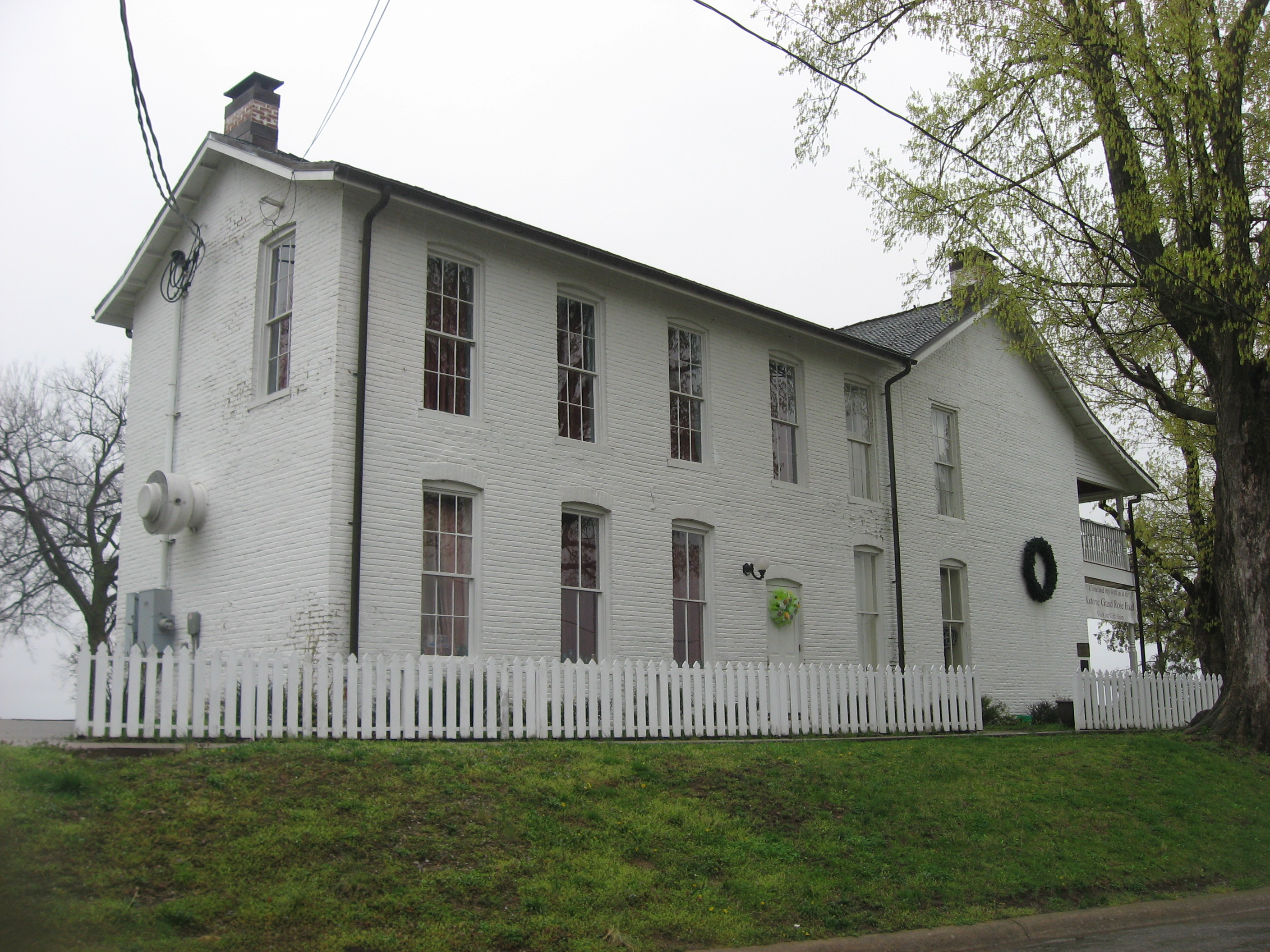
Elizabethtown was founded around the McFarland Tavern in 1812, which was soon rebuilt as the Rose Hotel. Until the 1960s when it closed as a hotel the Rose Hotel was the oldest continuously run hotel in the state of Illinois and now a state historic site.

One of the earliest settlers in the area of the future village of Elizabethtown was James McFarland who arrived around 1809. The village was later founded around the McFarland Tavern built in 1812. The tavern later became the site of the Rose Hotel named after the owner Sarah Rose. Up until the 1960s when it closed as a hotel the Rose Hotel was the oldest continuously run hotel in the state of Illinois and is now a state historic site. Elizabethtown was named after James McFarland's wife. The First Baptist Church located in Elizabethtown, is the oldest Baptist church congregation in Illinois and the oldest known Protestant church in Illinois, founded in 1806. Elizabethtown is referred to as "Etown" by the local population as the nickname is preserved in the name of the downtown E'town River Restaurant.

== Geography ==
Elizabethtown is located in southern Hardin County. It is bordered to the south by the Ohio River, which forms the state boundary with Kentucky.

Illinois Route 146 passes through the village, leading southwest (downriver) 15 miles (24 km) to Golconda and east 9 miles (14 km) to Illinois Route 1 north of Cave-In-Rock. Rosiclare, the only city in Hardin County, is reached by traveling 2.5 miles (4.0 km) west on IL-146 then 2 miles (3 km) south on IL-34.

According to the 2021 census gazetteer files, Elizabethtown has a total area of 0.71 square miles (1.84 km^{2}), of which 0.71 square miles (1.84 km^{2}) (or 99.30%) is land and 0.01 square miles (0.03 km^{2}) (or 0.70%) is water.

== Demographics ==
Historical population
Census	Pop.	Note	%±
1880	484		—
1890	652		34.7%
1900	668		2.5%
1910	633		−5.2%
1920	1,055		66.7%
1930	488		−53.7%
1940	622		27.5%
1950	583		−6.3%
1960	524		−10.1%
1970	436		−16.8%
1980	478		9.6%
1990	427		−10.7%
2000	348		−18.5%
2010	299		−14.1%
2020	220		−26.4%
U.S. Decennial Census

As of the 2020 census there were 220 people, 188 households, and 43 families residing in the village. The population density was 309.86 inhabitants per square mile (119.64/km^{2}). There were 173 housing units at an average density of 243.66 per square mile (94.08/km^{2}). The racial makeup of the village was 94.09% White, 0.45% African American, 0.00% Native American, 0.45% Asian, 0.00% Pacific Islander, 0.45% from other races, and 4.55% from two or more races. Hispanic or Latino of any race were 0.91% of the population.

There were 188 households, out of which 13.8% had children under the age of 18 living with them, 16.49% were married couples living together, 5.32% had a female householder with no husband present, and 77.13% were non-families. 75.00% of all households were made up of individuals, and 42.55% had someone living alone who was 65 years of age or older. The average household size was 3.28 and the average family size was 1.55.

The village's age distribution consisted of 16.7% under the age of 18, 8.3% from 18 to 24, 16% from 25 to 44, 24.6% from 45 to 64, and 34.3% who were 65 years of age or older. The median age was 59.1 years. For every 100 females, there were 81.8 males. For every 100 females age 18 and over, there were 76.1 males.

The median income for a household in the village was $17,143, and the median income for a family was $60,625. Males had a median income of $13,750 versus $22,500 for females. The per capita income for the village was $16,353. About 37.2% of families and 52.4% of the population were below the poverty line, including 65.9% of those under age 18 and 21.4% of those age 65 or over.

== See also ==
- Elizabethtown (disambiguation)
- List of cities and towns along the Ohio River
