= Hans Rudi Erdt =

German graphic designer

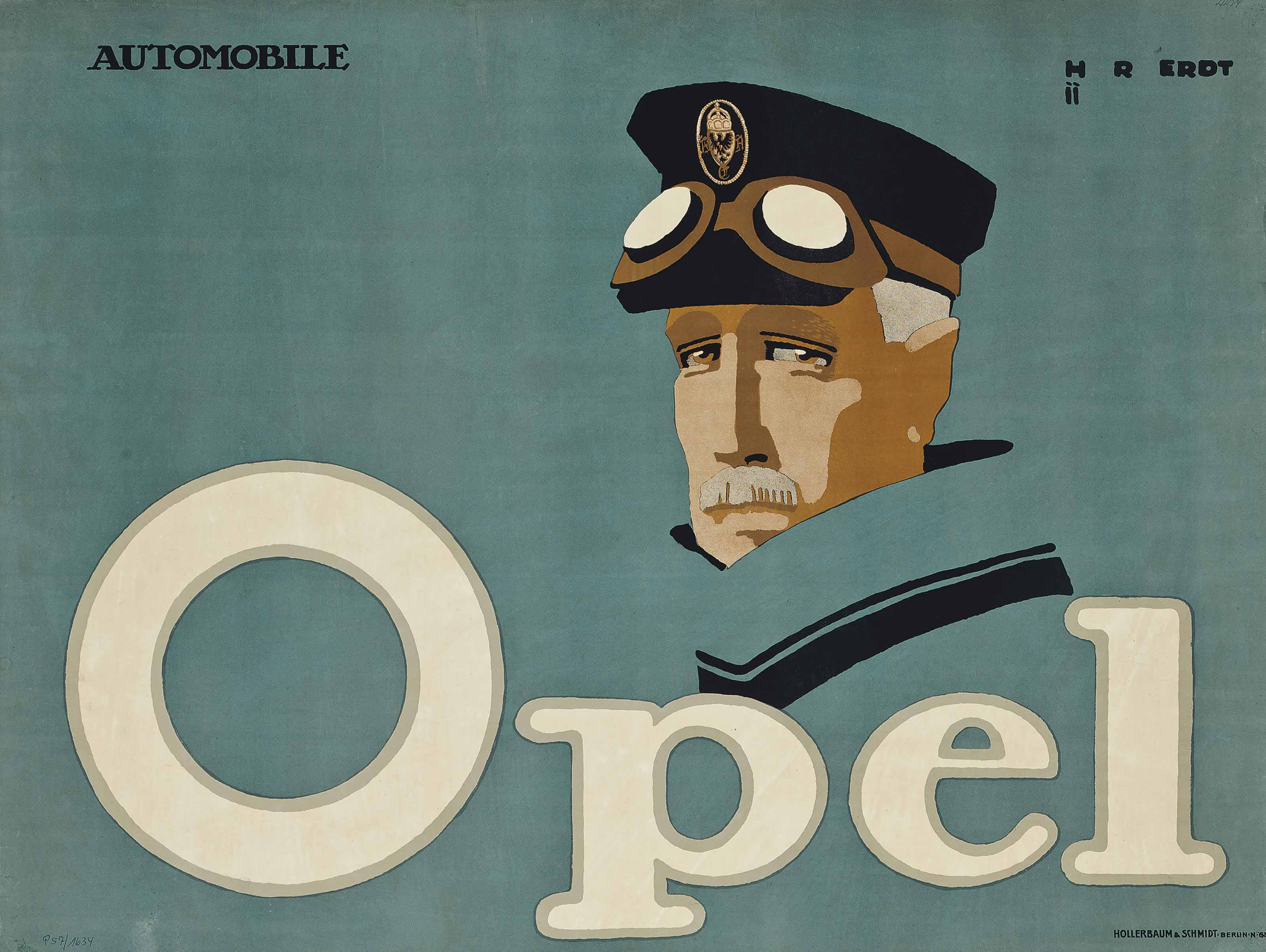
- Erdt advertisement poster for Opel Racing, 1911
- Born: 31 March 1883; Benediktbeuern, Bavaria
- Died: 24 May 1918 (aged 35); Berlin
- Occupations: Graphic designer, lithographer
- Known for: Sachplakat movement, poster propaganda, advertising

Hans Rudi Erdt (31 March 1883 – 24 May 1918) was a German graphic designer, lithographer and commercial artist known for his contributions to the Sachplakat movement created by Lucian Bernhard. His work at the prestigious Hollerbaum und Schmidt art printing company along with Edmund Edel, Hans Lindenstadt, Julius Klinger, Julius Gipkens, Paul Scheurich and Karl Schulpig make him one of the most important representatives of German poster art between 1906 and 1918. Erdt has also been recognized for his innovative use of typography in posters.

== Life and work ==
Born in Benediktbeuern, Bavaria, he trained as a lithographer and became a student of Maximilian Dasio at the Munich School of Applied Arts. He joined Hollerbaum und Schmidt around 1908, becoming part of the "Berlin School", where he created what is considered one of the most enduring examples of Sachplakat, an advertisement for the nascent racing division of the Opel car manufacturer. During World War I he created propaganda posters for the German State Film Committee, as well as promotional posters for propaganda films, some of which, like U Boote Heraus! became quite famous at the time.

His advertising work varied, from Nivea to illustrated weekly newspapers such as Die Woche, tourism and travel events and tobacco companies such as Batschari, Manoli and Mahala Problem.

Erdt died in Berlin of tuberculosis at the age of 35.

== Gallery ==
=== Advertisements ===
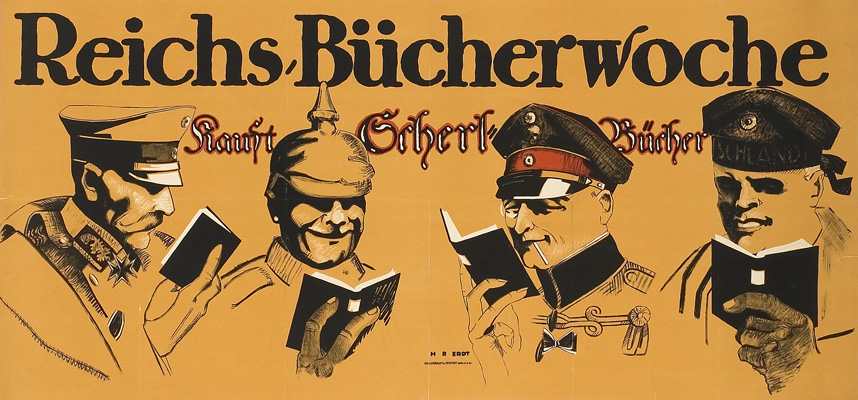
Reichs-Bücherwoche, ca. 1915.

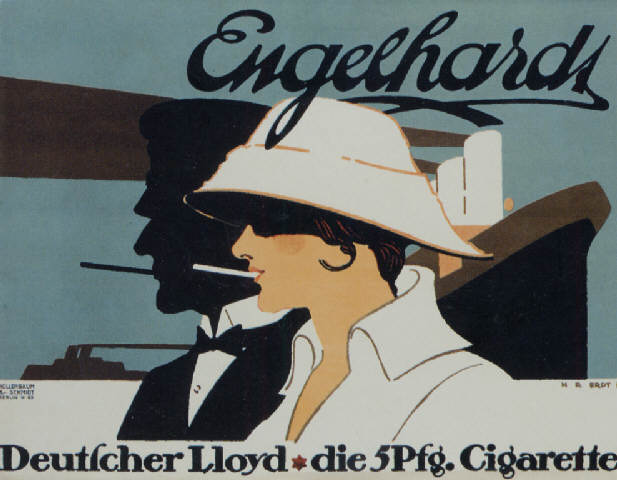
Engelhardt Cigarettes, 1915

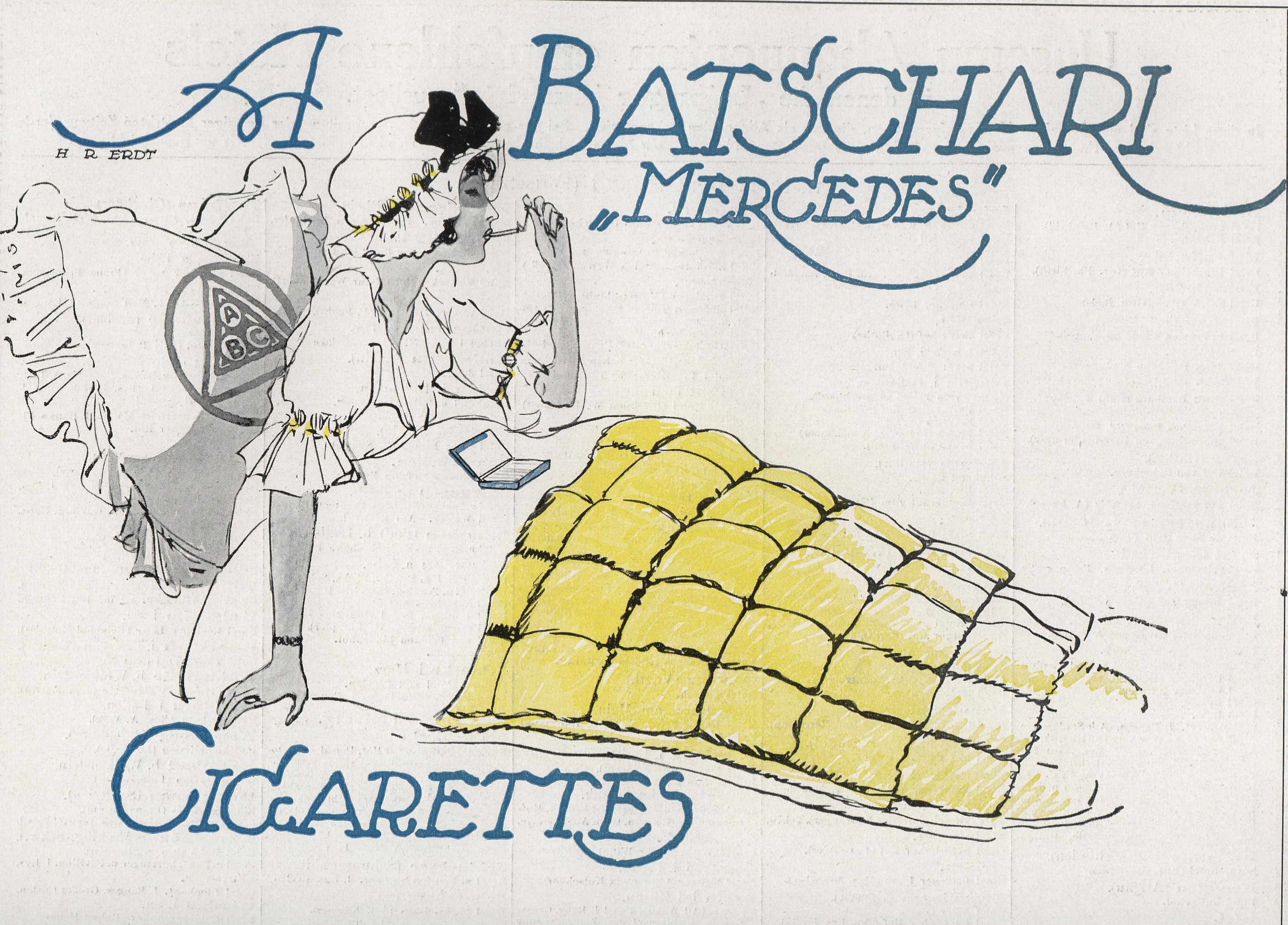
Batschari Mercedes Cigarettes, 1914

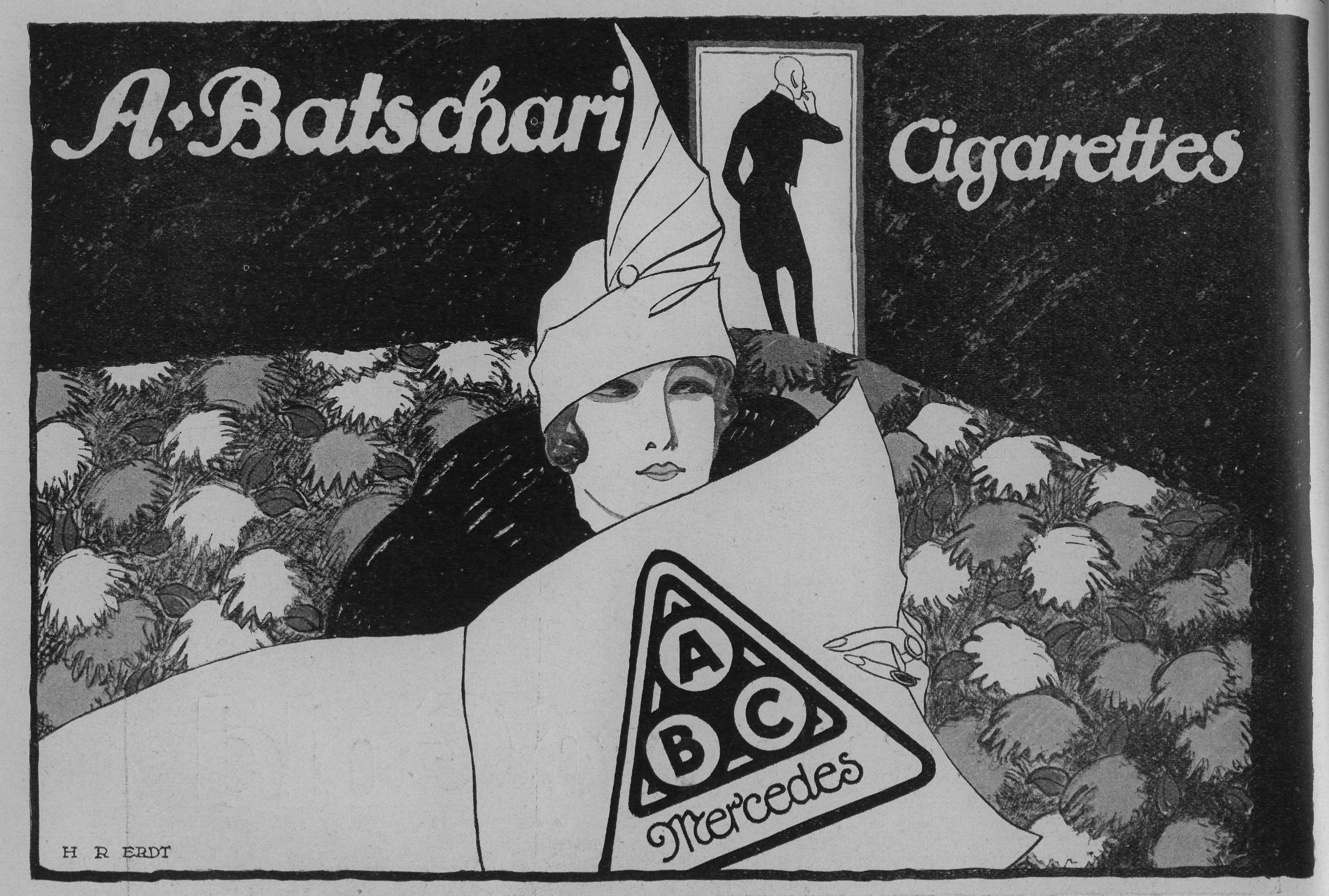
Batschari Jugend, 1914

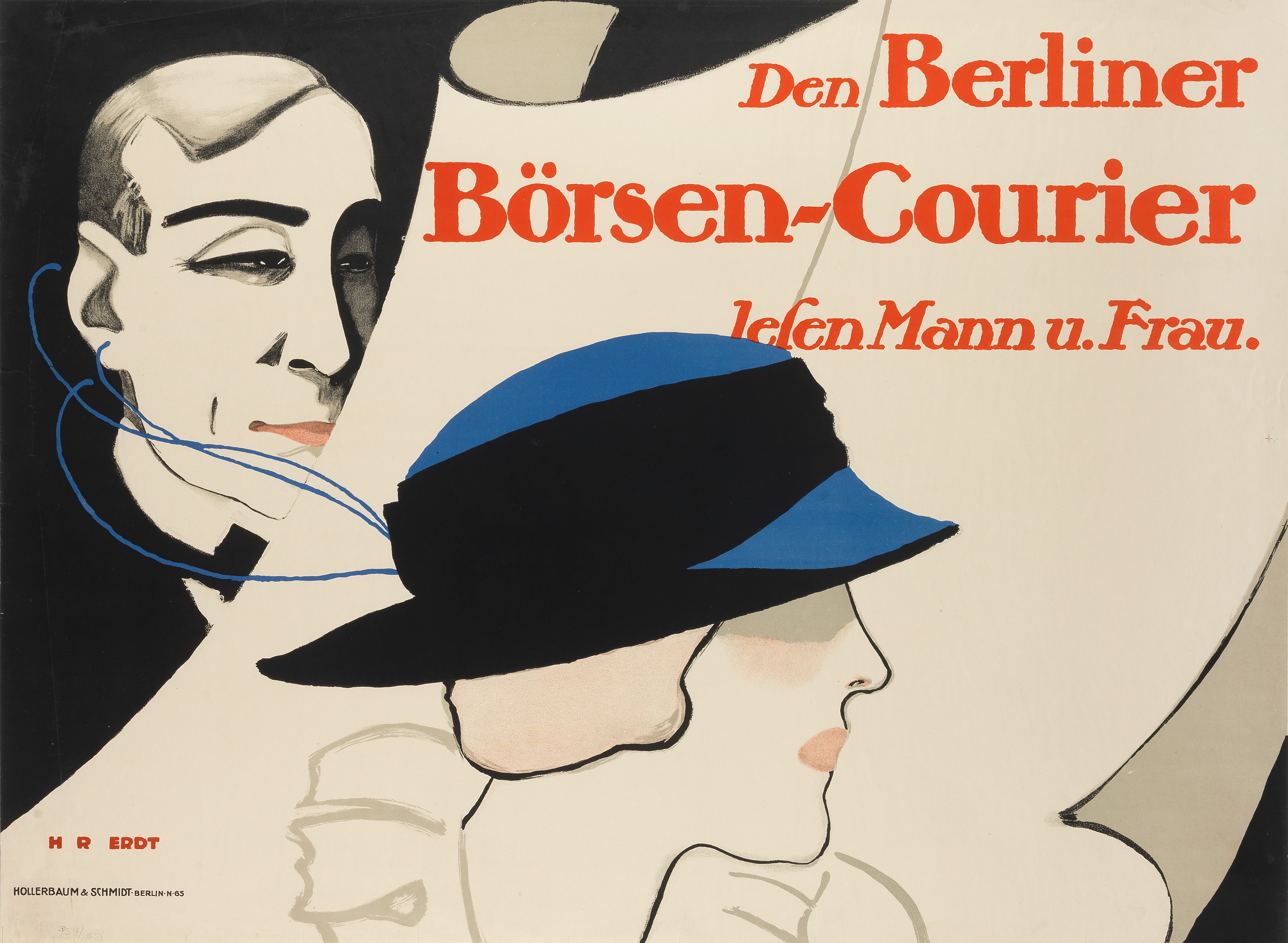
Den Berliner Börsen-Courier, 1913

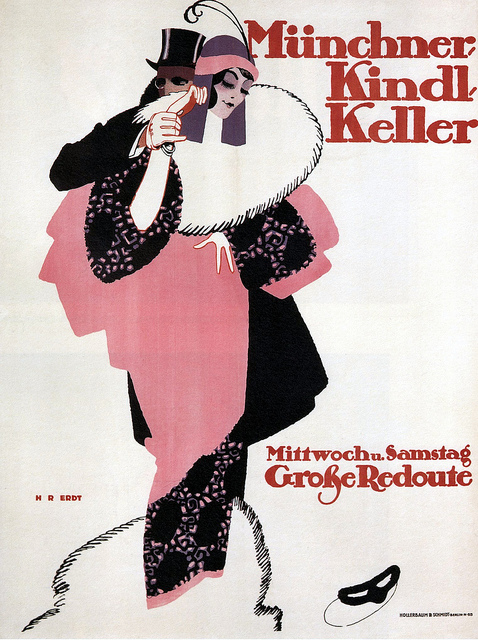
Münchner Kindl Keller, 1913

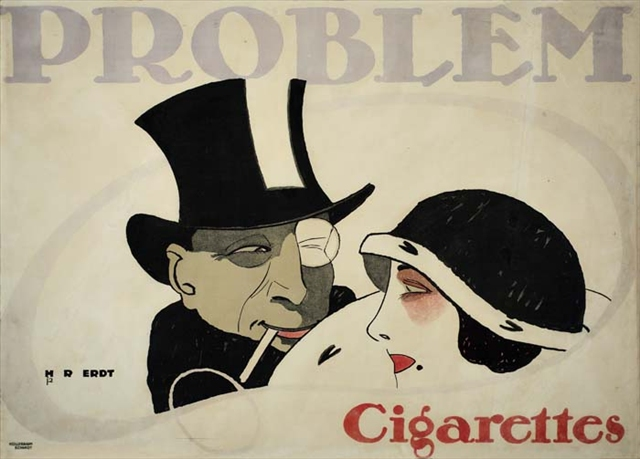
Mahala Problem Cigarettes, 1912

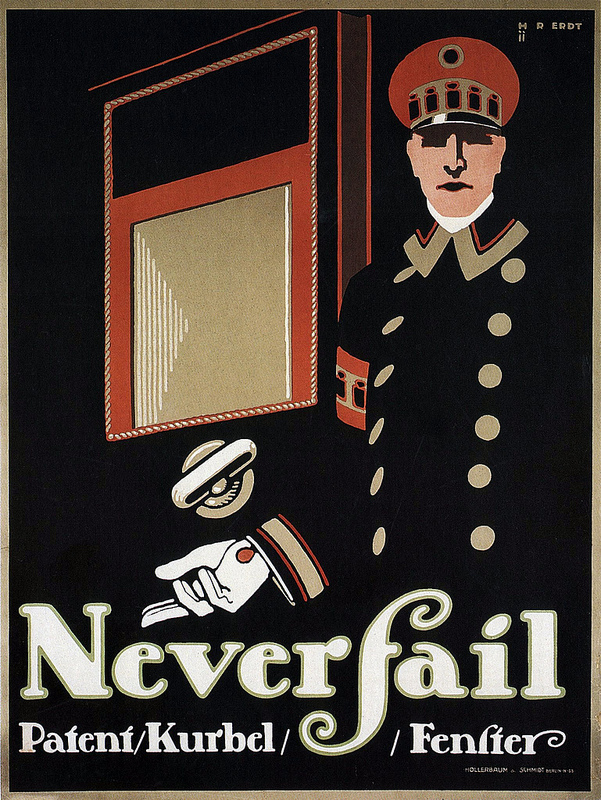
Never fail, 1911

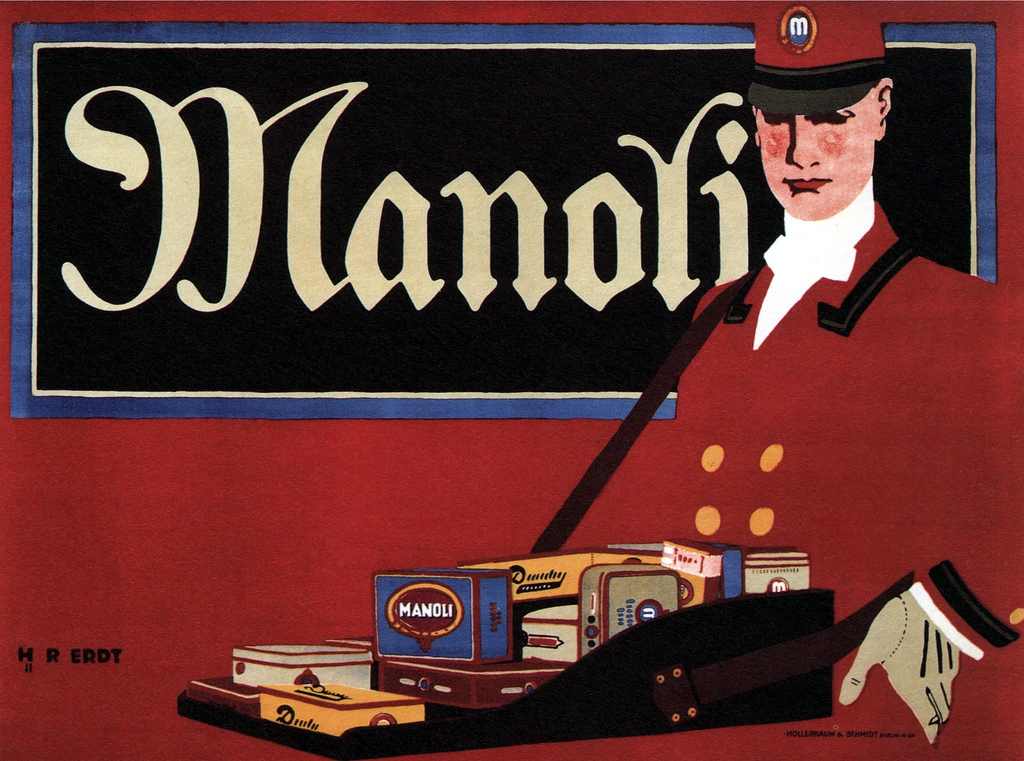
Manoli, 1911

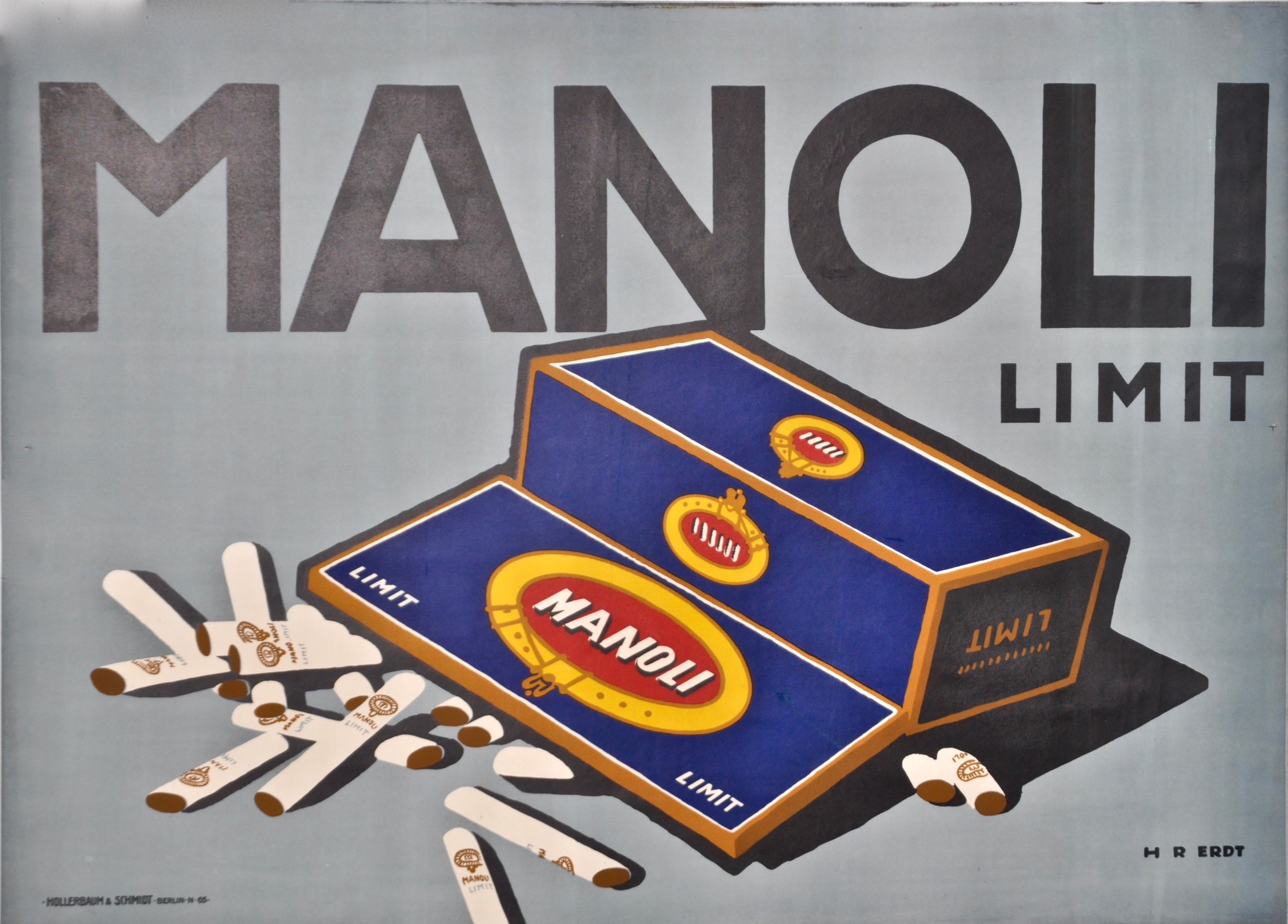
Manoli, 1910

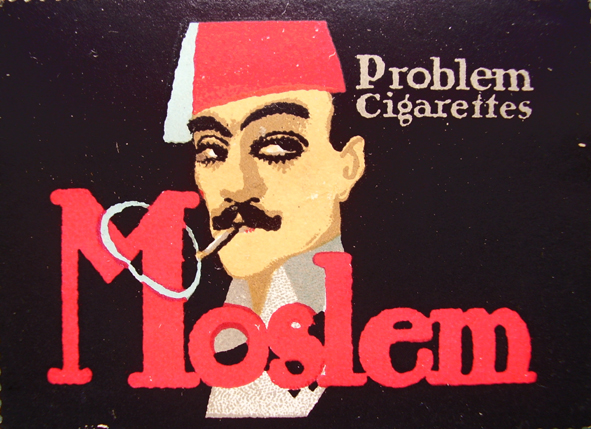
Moslem Cigarettes, 1908

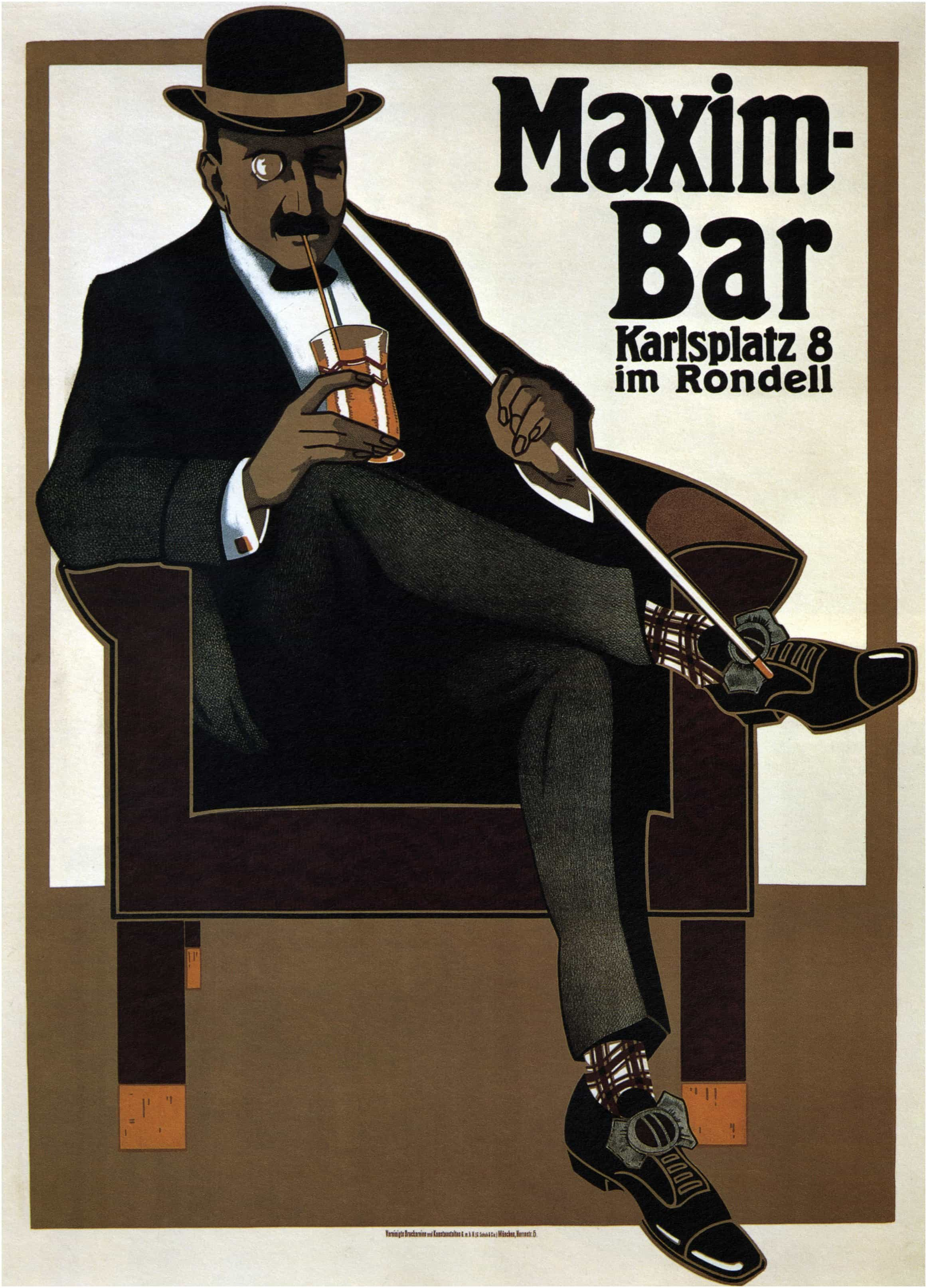
Maxim Bar, 1907

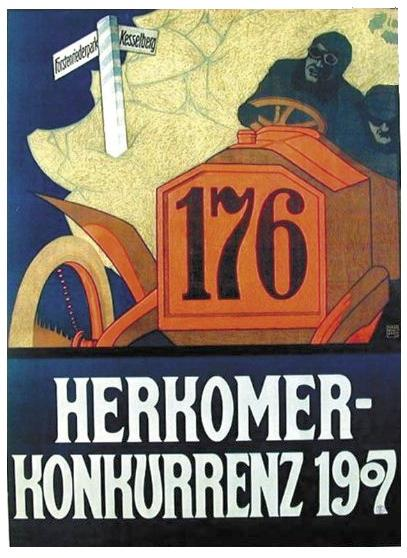
Herkomer Race, 1907

=== World War I film propaganda posters ===
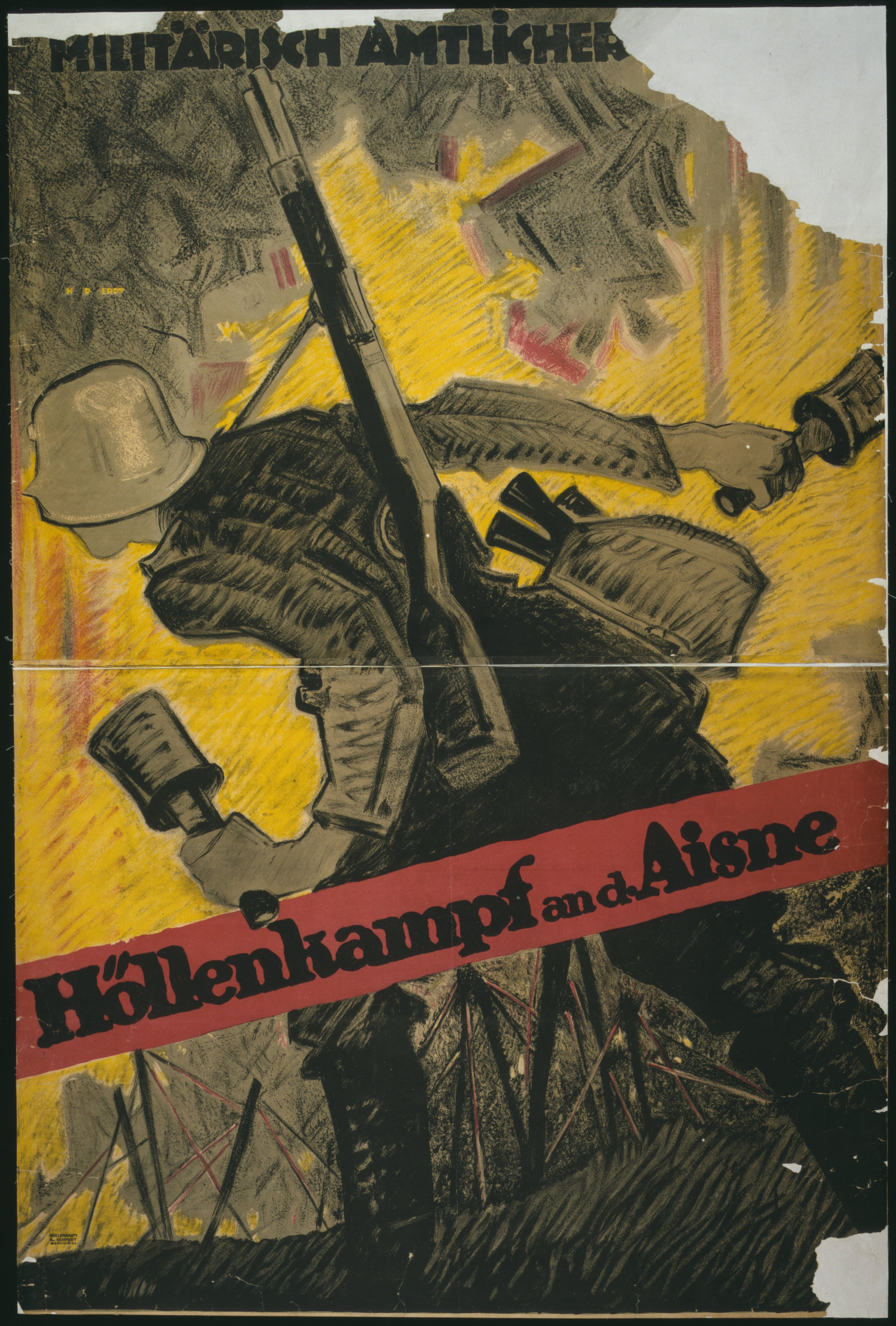
Hell fight on the Aisne River

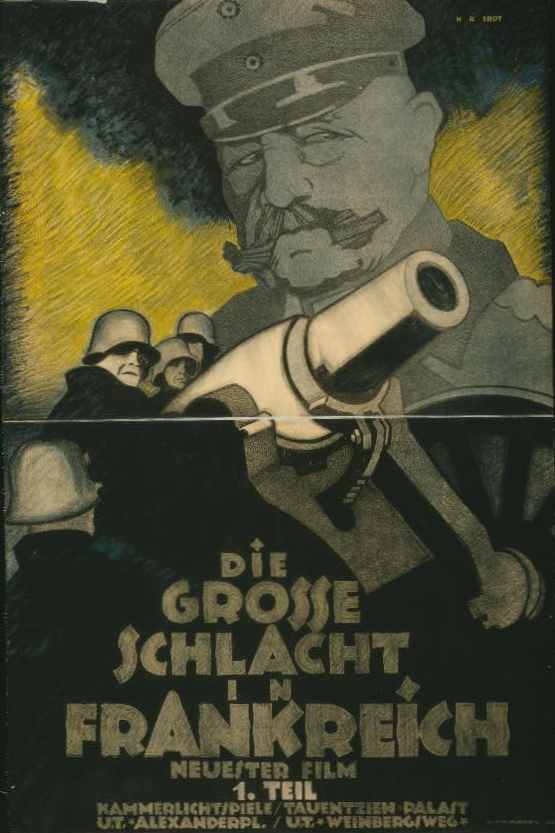
The Great Battle in France

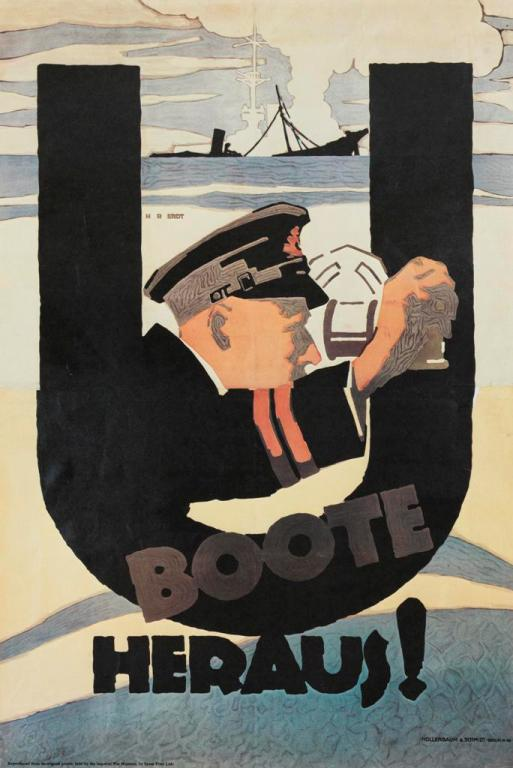
U Boote Heraus!

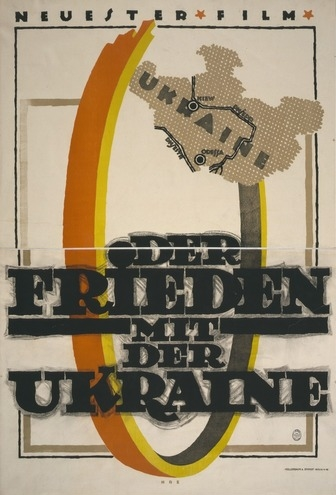
Der Frieden mit der Ukraine, 1918

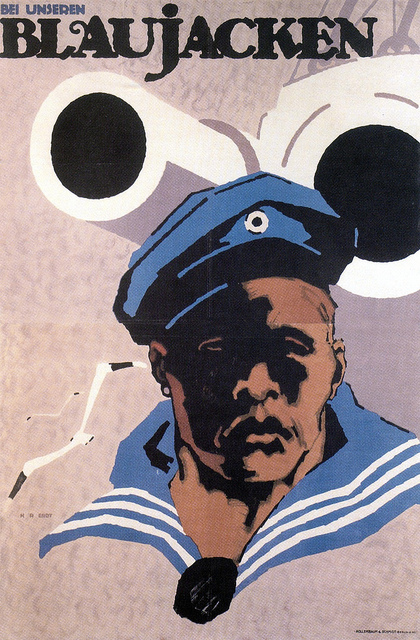
Bei Unseren Blaujacken, 1917

== Bibliography ==
- Meggs, Philip B.; Purvis, Alston W. (2011). Meggs' History of Graphic Design (5th Edition eBook ed.). John Wiley & Sons. ISBN 9781118017760.
- Eskilson, Stephen (2007). Graphic Design: A New History (Illustrated ed.). Yale University Press. ISBN 9780300120110.
- Aynsley, Jeremy (2000). Graphic Design in Germany: 1890-1945. Vol. 28 of Weimar and Now: German Cultural Criticism Series. Wolfsonian-Florida International University. University of California Press. ISBN 9780520227965.
- Meissner, Jörg (2004). Strategien der Werbekunst 1850-1933 (in German). Deutsches Historisches Museum. Kettler. ISBN 9783937390222.
- Vit, Armin; Gomez Palacio, Bryony (2011). Graphic Design Referenced: A Visual Guide to Language, Applications, and History of Graphic Design (Illustrated ed.). Rockport Publishers. ISBN 9781592537426.
- Seidman, Steven A. (2008). Posters, Propaganda, & Persuasion in Election Campaigns Around the World and Through History. Peter Lang. ISBN 9780820486161.
- Consuegra, David (2004). American Type Design and Designers. Skyhorse Publishing Inc. ISBN 9781581153200.
- de Jong, C.W.; Purvis, A.W.; Friedl, Friedrich (2005). Creative Type / druk 1: a sourcebook of classic and contemporary letterforms. R. Vatter-Buck (translator). Inmerc. ISBN 9789066112506.
- Jones, Geoffrey (2010). Beauty Imagined:A History of the Global Beauty Industry. Oxford University Press. ISBN 9780191609619.
- Tungate, Mark (2011). Branded Beauty: How Marketing Changed the Way We Look. Kogan Page Publishers. ISBN 9780749461829.
- Diagram Group (2006). Lettering & Calligraphy Workbook. Sterling Publishing Company, Inc. ISBN 9781402741012.
- Heyman, Neil M. (1997). World War I (eBook ed.). Greenwood Publishing Group. ISBN 9780313298806.
- Moore, Colin (2010). Propaganda Prints: A history of art in the service of social and political change. A&C Black. ISBN 9781408105917.
- Welch, David (2000). Germany, Propaganda and Total War, 1914-1918: The Sins of Omission. Rutgers Depth of Field. Rutgers University Press. ISBN 9780813527987.
- Weill, Alain (1985). The poster: a worldwide survey and history. G.K. Hall. ISBN 9780816187461.
- Joachim-Felix, Leonhardt; Hans-Werner, Ludwig; Schwarze, Dietrich; Stra Ner, Erich (1999). Medienwissenschaft: Ein Handbuch Zur Entwicklung Der Medien und Kommunikationsformen (in German). Vol. 1. Walter de Gruyter. ISBN 9783110139617.
- Raimes, Jonathan; Bhaskaran, Lakshmi (2007). Retro Graphics: A Visual Sourcebook to 100 Years of Graphic Design. Chronicle Books. ISBN 9780811855082.
- Ronge, Tobias (2010). Das Bild des Herrschers in Malerei und Grafik des Nationalsozialismus: Eine Untersuchung zur Ikonografie von Führer- und Funktionärsbildern im Dritten Reich (in German). Vol. 89 of Kunstgeschichte. Westfalen: LIT Verlag Münster. ISBN 9783643108562.
