= Plakatstil =

German 20th-century poster art style

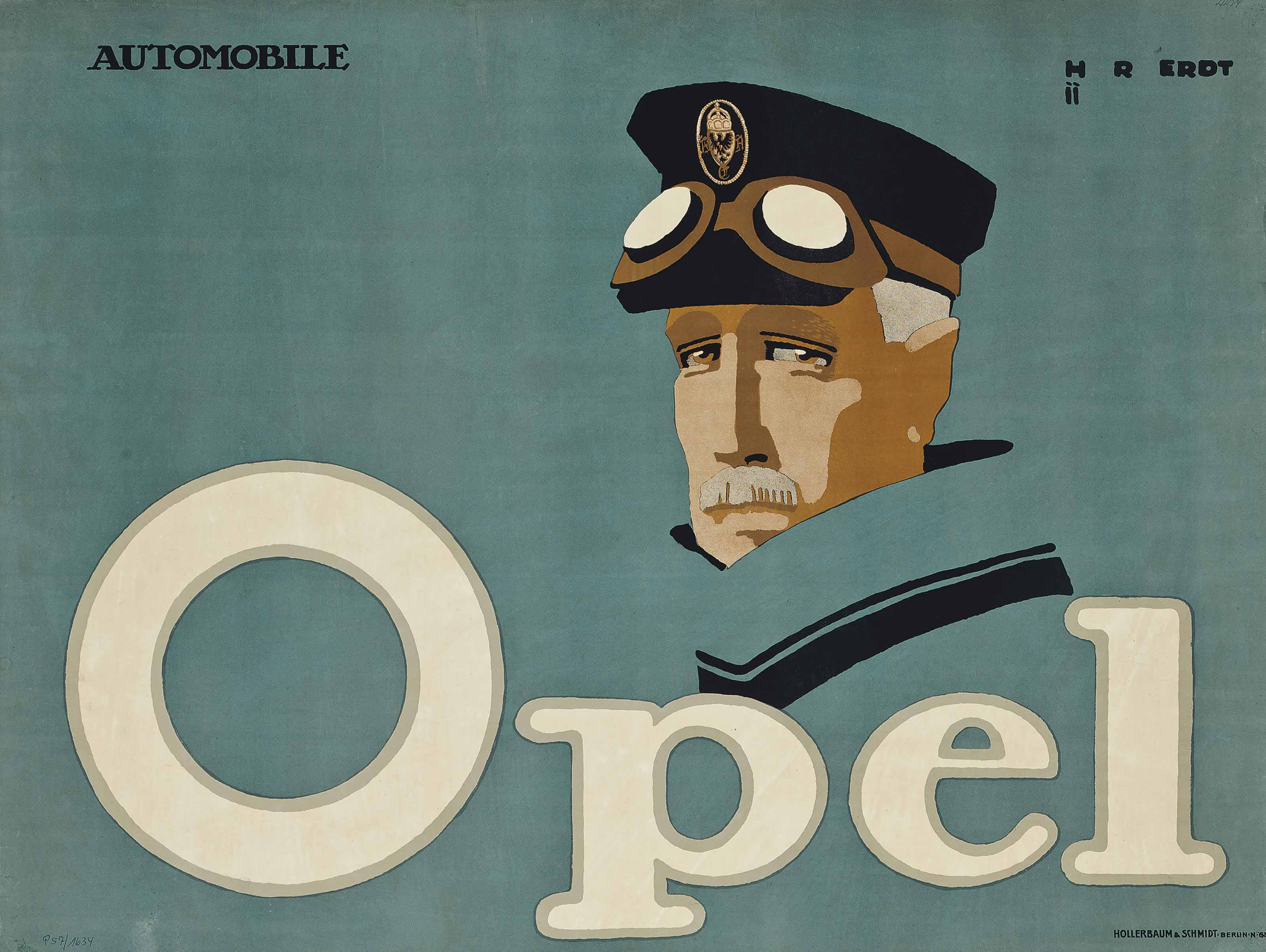
Poster for Opel automobiles, by Hans Rudi Erdt, (1911).

Plakatstil (lit. 'poster style'), alongside Sachplakat (lit. 'object poster'), were early styles of poster art that originated in Germany in the 1900s.

Plakatstil was started by Lucian Bernhard of Berlin in 1906. The common characteristics of this style are bold eye-catching lettering with flat colors. Shapes and objects are simplified, and the composition focuses on a central object; usually a product that is being sold. Plakatstil turned away from the complexity of Art Nouveau and propagated a more modern outlook on poster art. Famous Plakatstil artists include Ludwig Hohlwein, Edmund Edel, Ernst Deutsch-Dryden, Hans Lindenstadt, Julius Klinger, Julius Gipkens, Paul Scheurich, Karl Schulpig and Hans Rudi Erdt. A later master of the Sachplakat was Otto Baumberger.

Sachplakat, on the other hand, is the object posters emphasizing shapes over textual descriptions. Plakatstil and Sachplakat are both early 20th-century German poster styles, but they have distinct approaches to visual communication. Plakatstil, or "poster style," emerged around 1905, pioneered by artists like Lucian Bernhard. This style focuses on extreme simplicity, using flat, high-contrast colors, bold typography, and minimal detail. The subject is often a central product or brand name, making the message immediately clear and memorable with very little text or background. By contrast, Sachplakat, or "object poster," also emphasizes simplicity but in a more realistic and literal way. Artists of the Sachplakat movement, like Ludwig Hohlwein, focused on depicting the advertised product in a realistic, straightforward manner, often as a standalone object with little to no added embellishment. Both styles aim to communicate quickly and effectively, but while Plakatstil emphasizes bold, abstract reduction, Sachplakat leans toward realistic, almost photographic representation of products.

Das Plakat was a German art magazine that was published from 1910 to 1921 by the Verein der Plakatfreunde ("association of friends of the poster"), founded in 1905 and later edited by the Berlin dentist Hans Sachs. Lucian Bernhard was a director of the association.

== Gallery ==
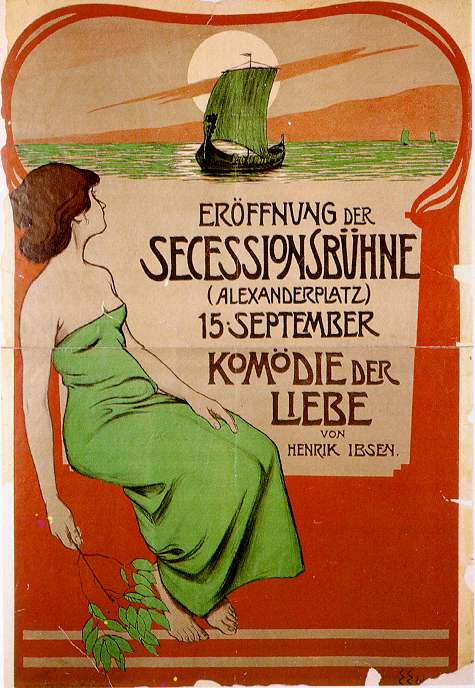
Edmund Edel, theatre poster for Komödie der Liebe by Henrik Ibsen

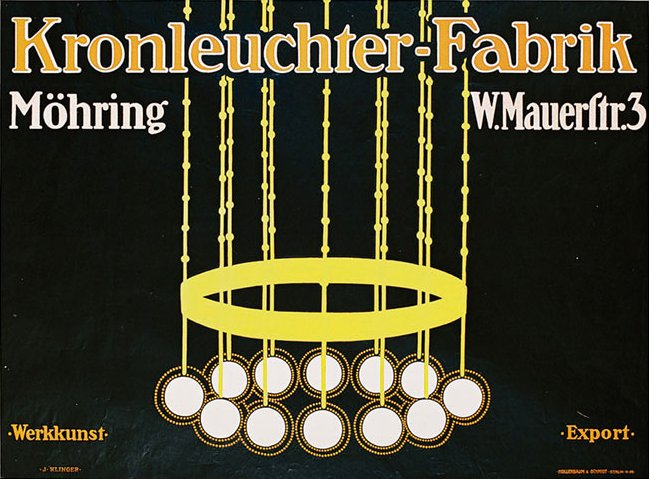
Julius Klinger: Möhring candelabra factory, 1908

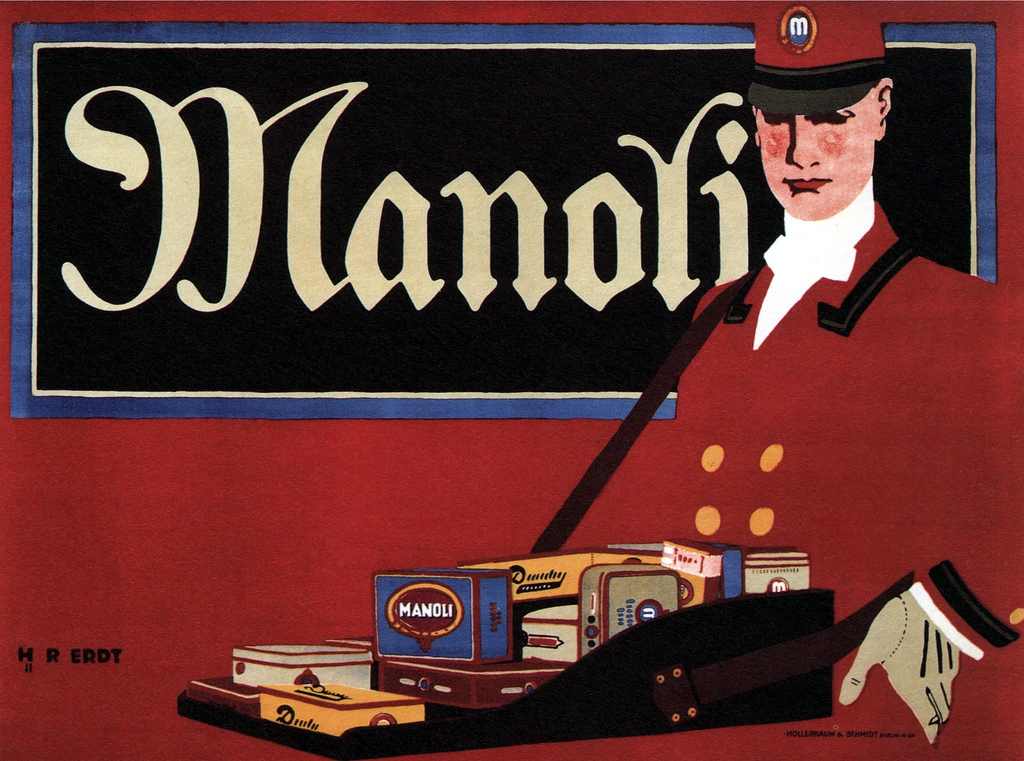
Hans Rudi Erdt, Manoli, 1911

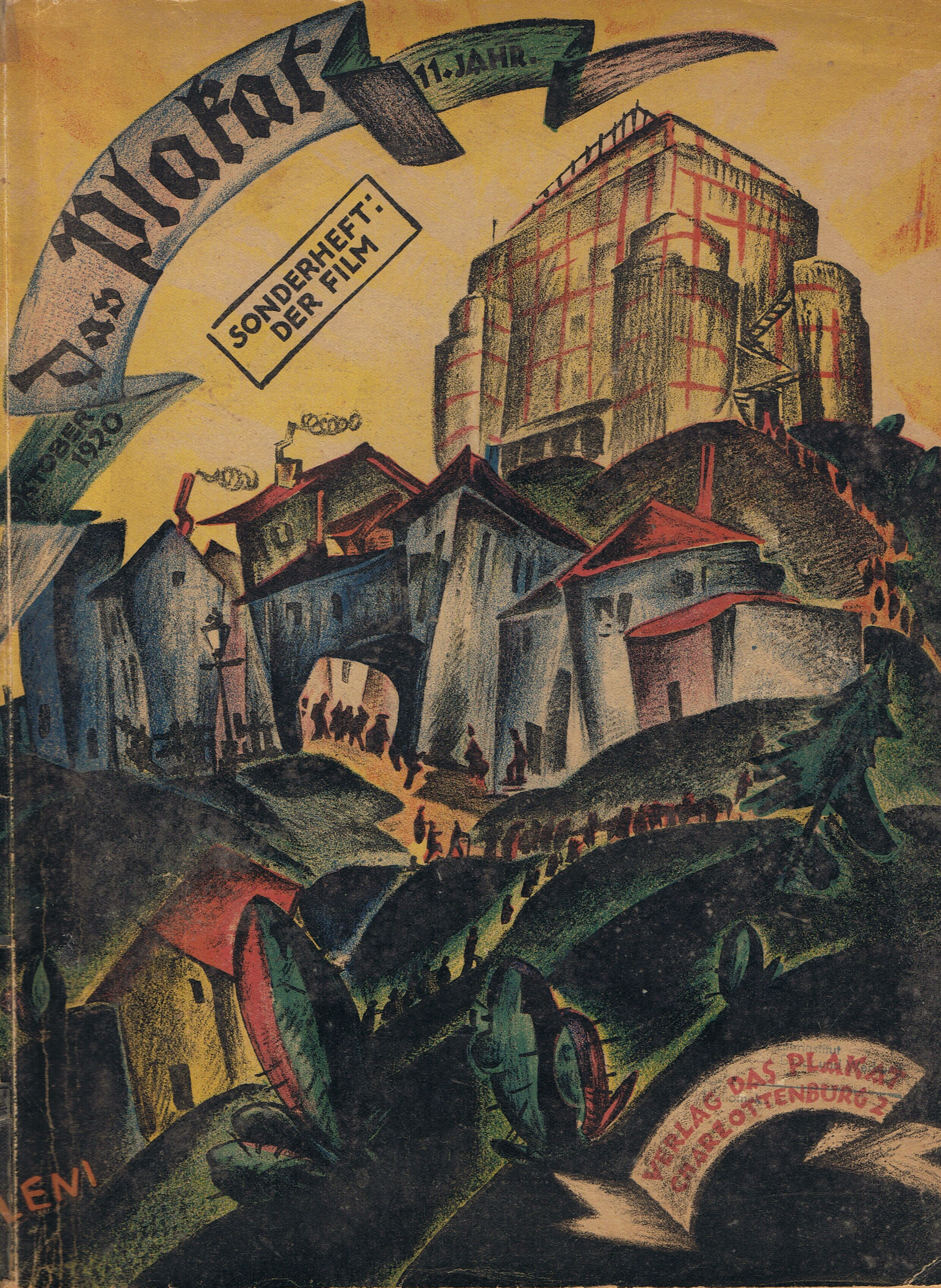
Das Plakat special issue on The Movie, October 1920; cover by Paul Leni
