= Mahala Problem Cigarettes =

Cigarette company in Berlin, Germany

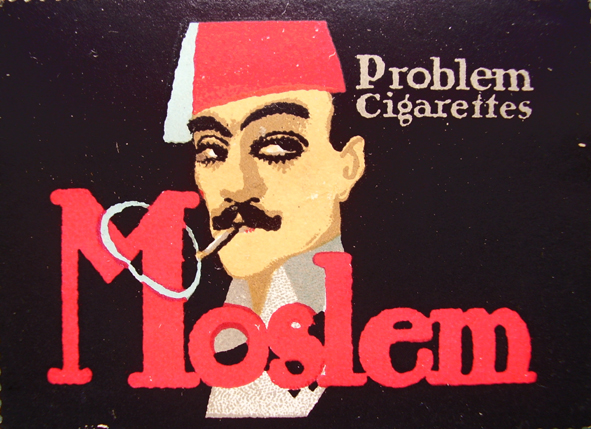
Advertisement for Moslem cigarettes in 1908. Advertisement by Hans Rudi Erdt.

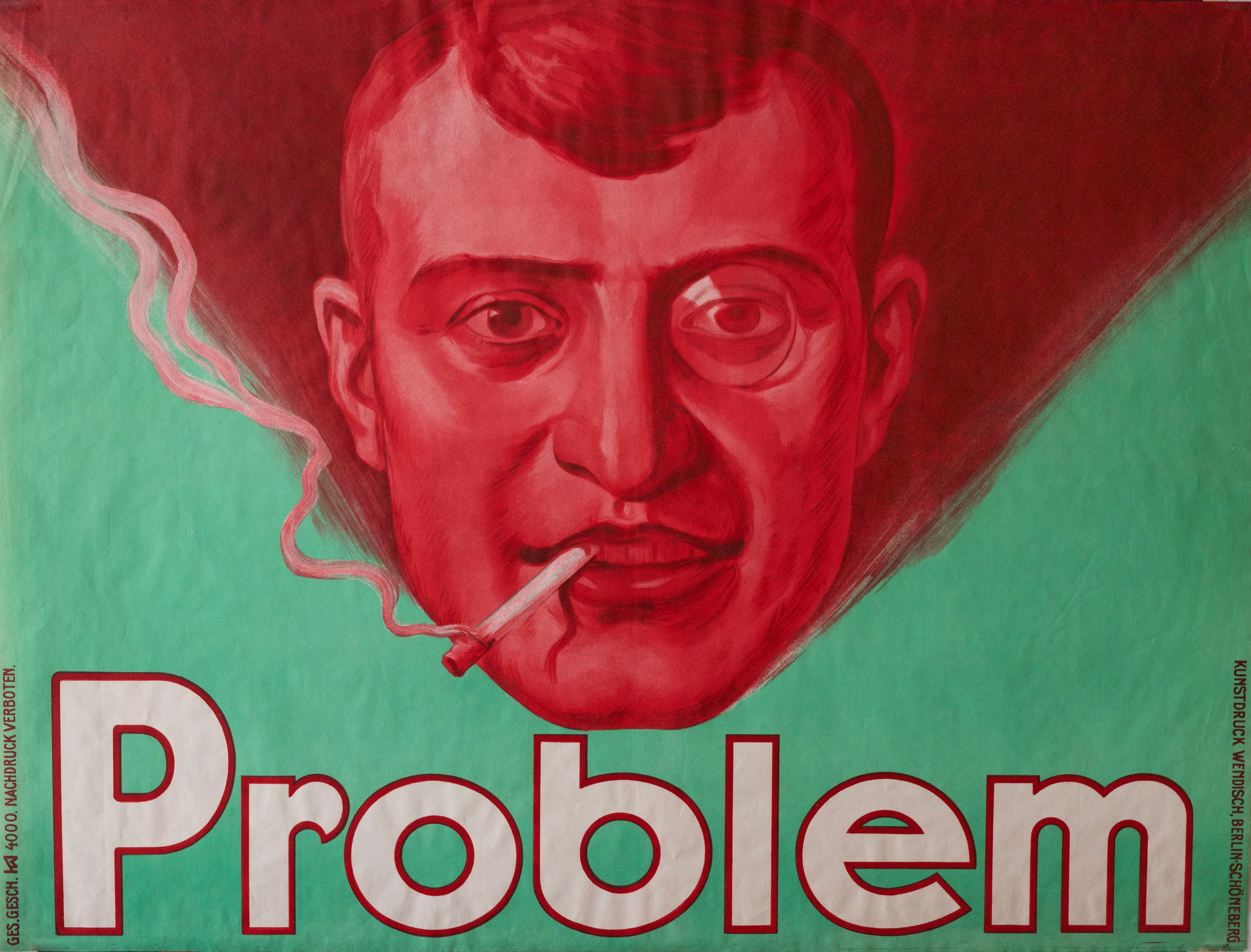
Advertisement (1920)

Mahala Problem, officially Problem oHG, was a cigarette company from Berlin, popular and successful before and after the First World War. The company was founded on March 25, 1889, by Szlama Rochmann in Berlin, and later bought in 1932 by Reemtsma.

== History ==
=== Company Creation ===
The Jewish cigarette manufacturer Szlama Rochmann (17 June 1857–17 December 1925) founded in 1889 Cigarettenmanufaktur Mahala-Problem (Cigarette manufacturer Mahala-Problem) at Alexanderstraße 13/22 (Alexanderhof) in Berlin. This was after his brother, Baruch Rochmann (1863–1926), had taken over the family cigarette manufacturing company "Namkori-Phänomen" from his father Israel Jacob Rochman (22 June 1837–31 July 1881) in 1881.

At the turn of the 20th century, Szlama hired commercial artists such as Louis Oppenheim, Ernst Deutsch-Dryden, Lindenstaedt, Lucian Bernhard to create advertisements. The German commercial artist Hans Rudi Erdt created the famous Fez-wearing Moslem as the brand image for the Problem-Cigarettes.

In 1914, after the 25th anniversary of the company, Szlama acquired the grounds of 212-213 Greifswalder Straße in Berlin from Gustav Magnus (not to be confused with Heinrich Gustav Magnus), to turn it in the headquarters for manufacturing of their cigarette brands. Between 1914 and 1929, the Jewish architect Moritz Ernst Lesser and Ernst Ludwig Freud (Son of Sigmund Freud) were commissioned to build the factory for production and storage. The Rochmann family with four children were also living at the building.

After the death of Szlama in 1925, his two sons Heinrich Rochmann and Carl Rochmann took over the father's business, still headquartered on the Greifswalder Straße. The tombstones of Szlama, his parents and his brother are located at the Jewish graveyard of Berlin-Weißensee.

=== Downfall ===
After a bad harvest of Turkish tobacco, increased taxes for the storage of tobacco, as well as the onset of the Great Depression, the family sold first the brand Problem-Cigarettes (1930), and then the entire company (1932) to the Hamburg based company Reemtsma. Szlama's wife (Hanna) and their sons moved to the west Berlin, while their daughter Erna lived with her husband in Central Berlin (Prager Platz). The production halls were then rented out by Reemtsma from 1935 to the Reichsarbeitsdienst and were converted into sewing halls.

With the rise of Adolf Hitler in Germany, Heinrich Rochmann was successful in emigrating to England in 1934. Carl Rochmann and his wife Else were murdered in 1942 after being deported to Auschwitz during World War II. The family house was auctioned in 1943.

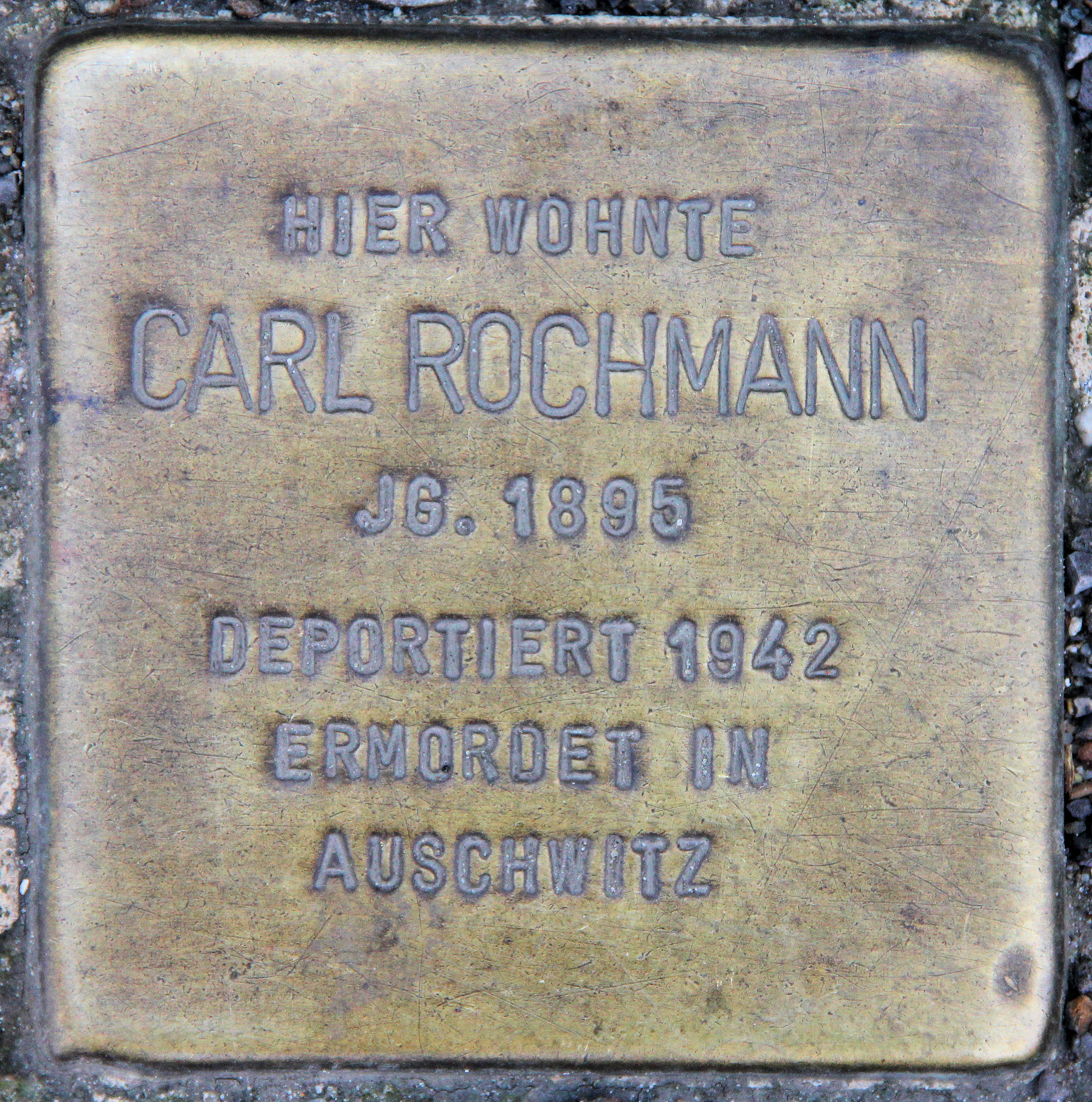
Stolperstein of Carl Rochmann

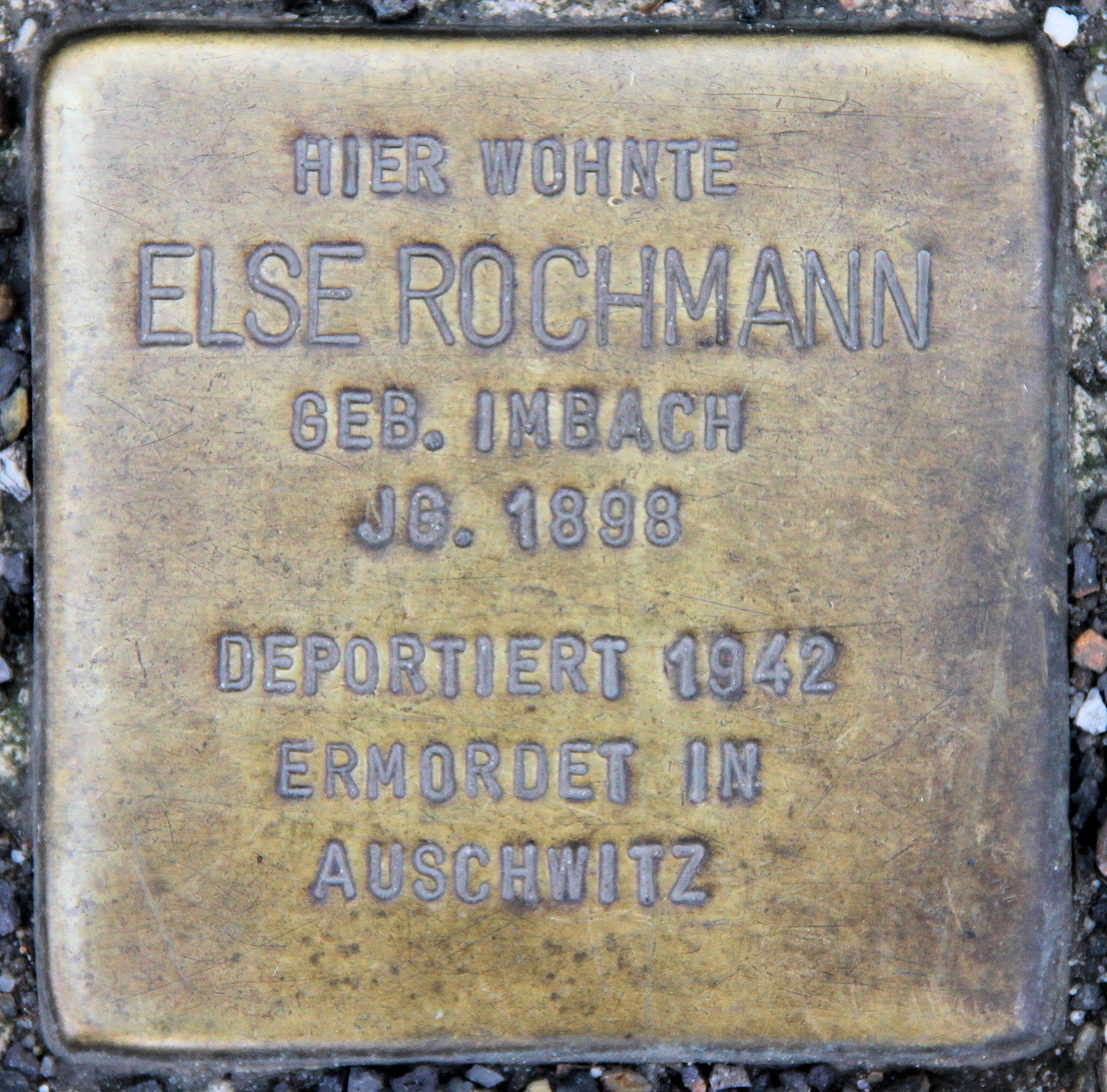
Stolperstein of Else Rochmann

== Cigarette Brands ==
- Element
- Esquire
- Ethik
- Kaiserloge
- Königsloge (originally Royal-Box)
- Mahala
- Moslem
- National
- Passant (En Passant)
- Sokrates
- Trans

== See also ==
- Jewish Museum, Berlin Collection of Rochmann; a gift from two nieces and a great-niece of Szlama Rochmann.

== Sources ==
- Die Entstehungsgeschichte des Gewerbehofes Greifswalder Straße 212/213 von 1826 bis 2006, D. Eberding, Architekt 2006
