= Ludwig Hohlwein =

German poster artist (1874-1949)

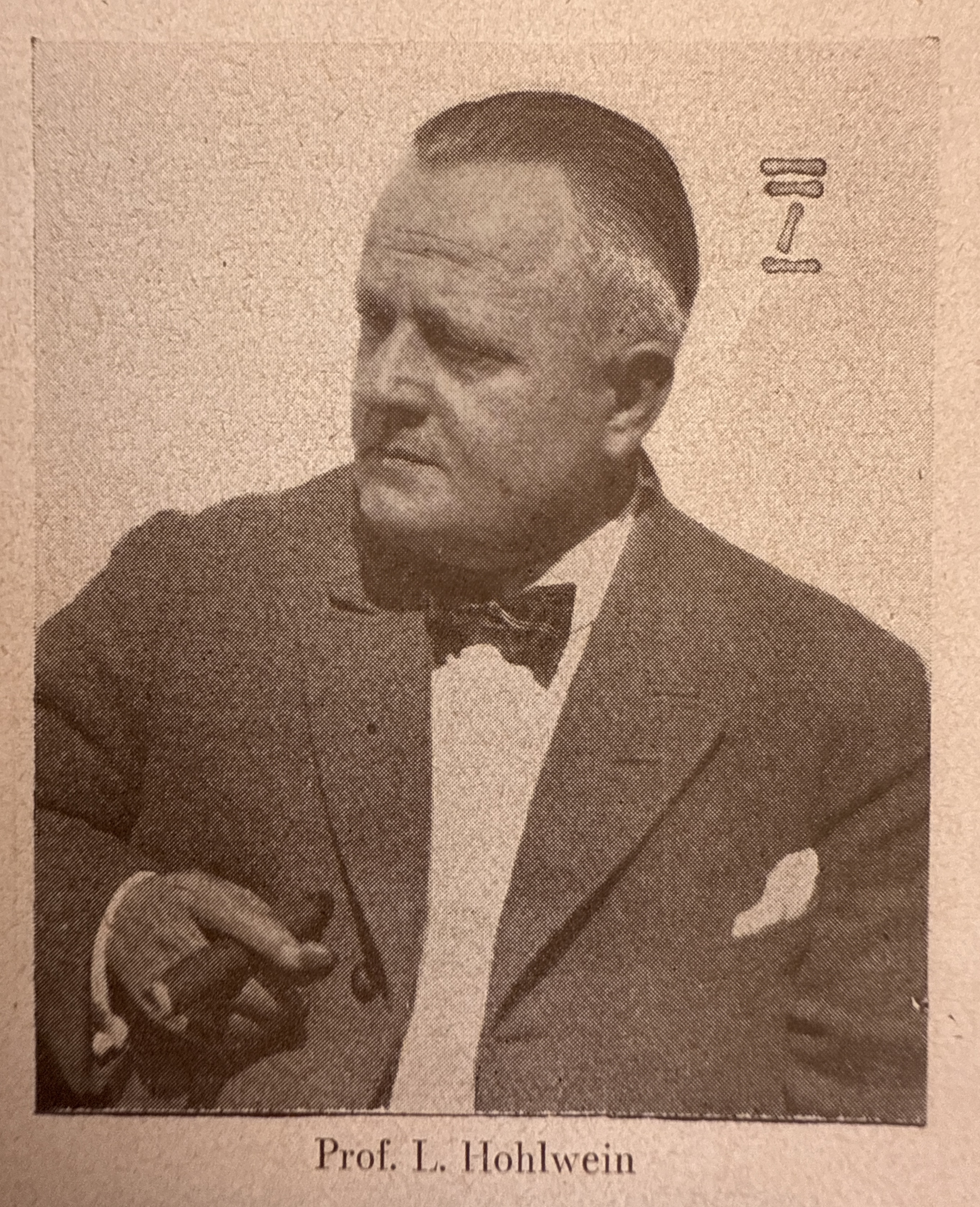
- Hohlwein in 1924
- Born: July 26, 1874; Wiesbaden, German Empire
- Died: September 15, 1949 (aged 75); Berchtesgaden, West Germany
- Style: Gebrauchsgrafik

Ludwig Hohlwein (26 July 1874 in Wiesbaden – 15 September 1949 in Berchtesgaden) was a German poster artist, a pioneer of the Sachplakat style. He trained and practiced as an architect in Munich before he switched to poster design.

== Early years ==
Hohlwein was born in the Rhine-Main region of Germany, though he and his work are associated with Munich and Bavaria in southern Germany. There were two schools of "Gebrauchsgrafik" in Germany at the time, North and South. Hohlwein's high tonal contrasts and a network of interlocking shapes made his work instantly recognizable.

== Career ==
A large portion of his work dates to 1908-1925. His style usually consists of sharply defined forms, bright colors, a good portion of humor and textured patterns. By 1925, he had already designed 3000 different advertisements.

During World War II, he was a member of the Nazi party and worked closely with Joseph Goebbels and The Ministry of Propaganda and Enlightenment. And as an ardent nationalist, indicated by his work for the government during both World Wars, he urged other artists to join the effort when Hitler came to power in 1933.

“May the best among us realize fully the significance of what is at stake and their own responsibility, and may we labor creatively and with conviction at the preservation of our cultural civilization and its restoration to perfectly healthy conditions.”

"Holhwein’s posters for Nazi Germany are the most dramatic examples of National Socialist realism."

His work was also part of the art competitions at the 1932 Summer Olympics and the 1936 Summer Olympics.

== Recognition ==
Poster historian Alain Weill comments that "Hohlwein was the most prolific and brilliant German posterist of the 20th century... Beginning with his first efforts, Hohlwein found his style with disconcerting facility. It would vary little for the next forty years. The drawing was perfect from the start, nothing seemed alien to him, and in any case, nothing posed a problem for him. His figures are full of touches of color and a play of light and shade that brings them out of their background and gives them substance"

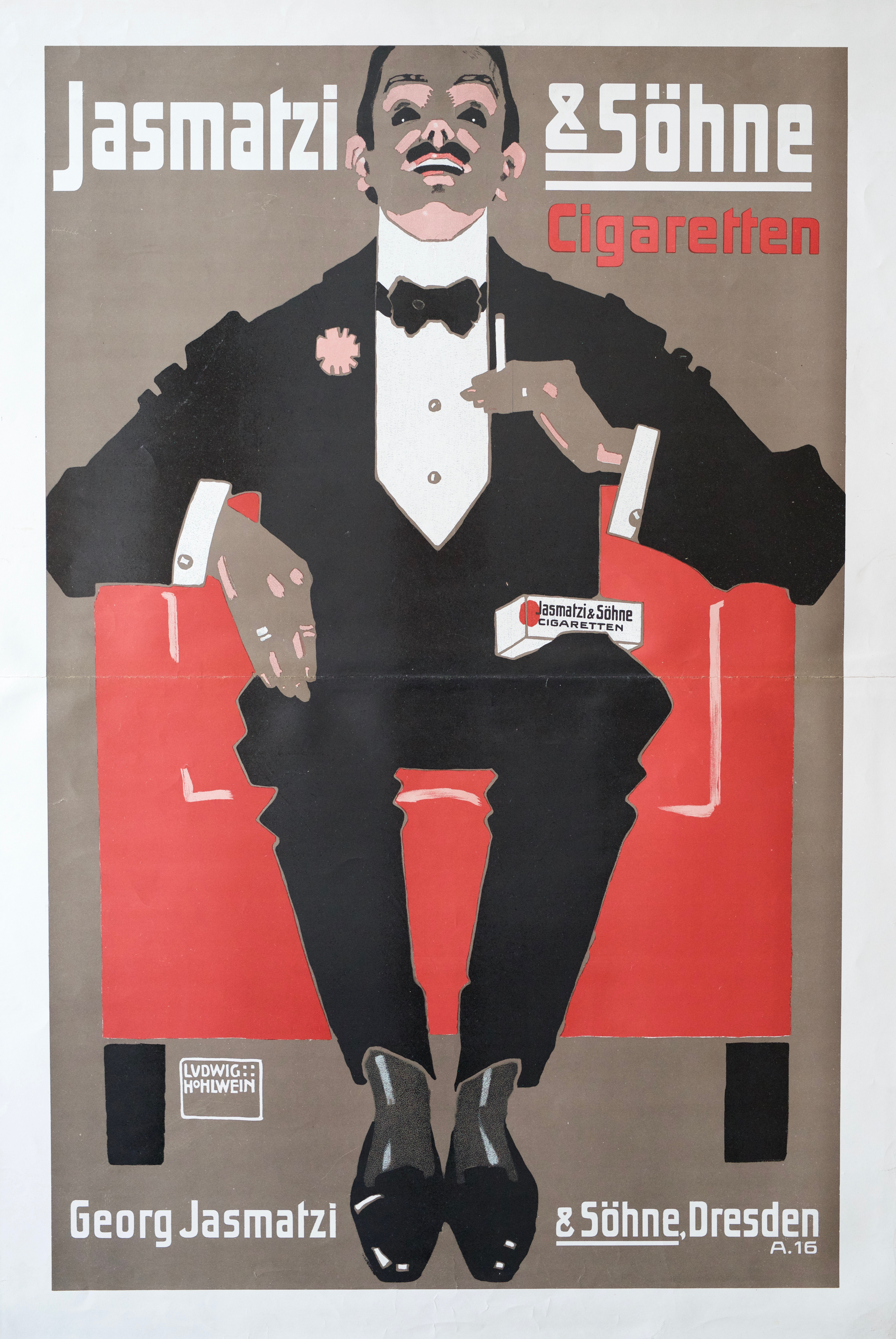
Poster for Jasmatzi (1908)

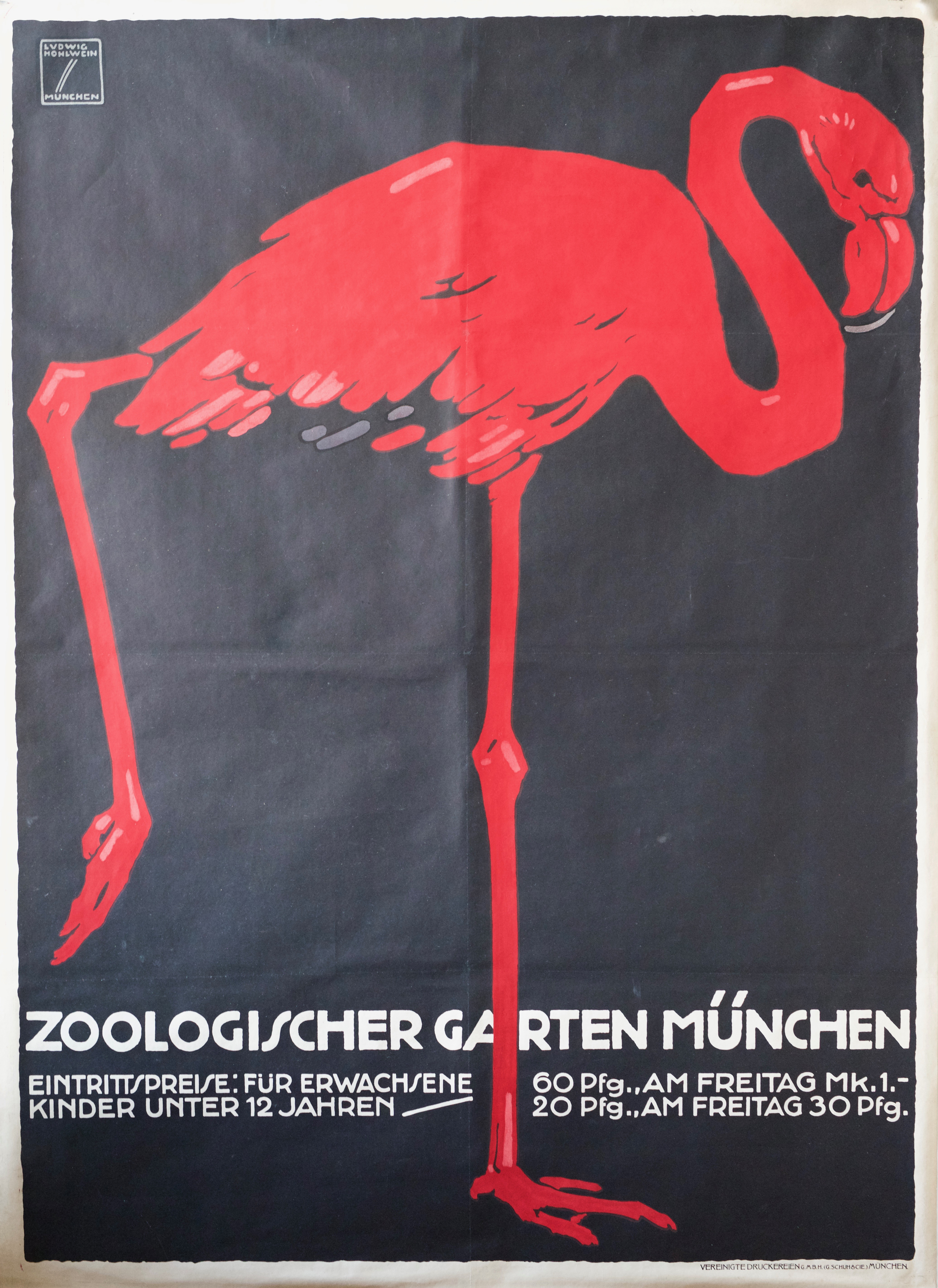
Advertising for Hellabrunn Zoo (1912)

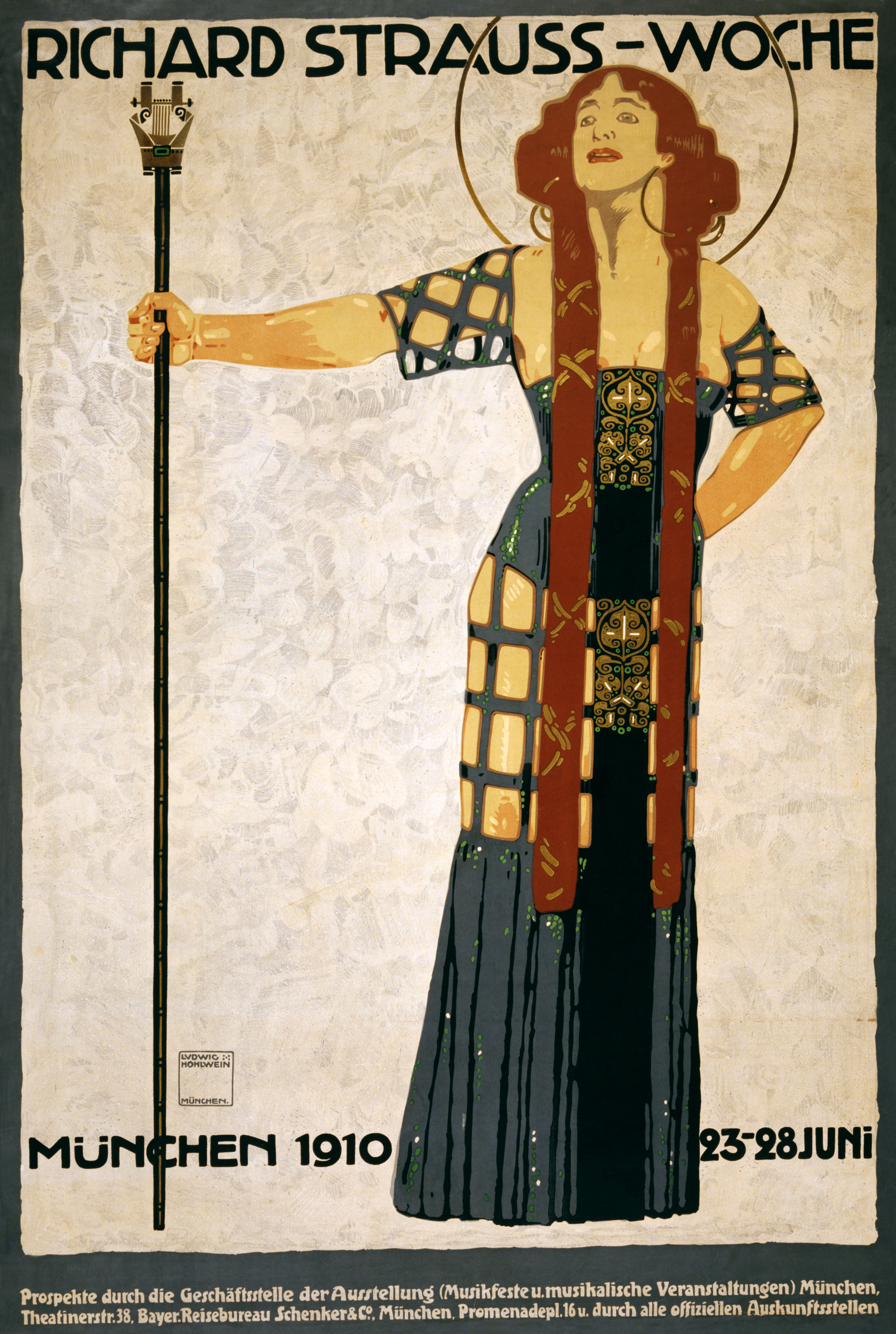
1910 poster for a Richard Strauss festival
