= Otto Baumberger =

Swiss painter, graphic artist and poster designer

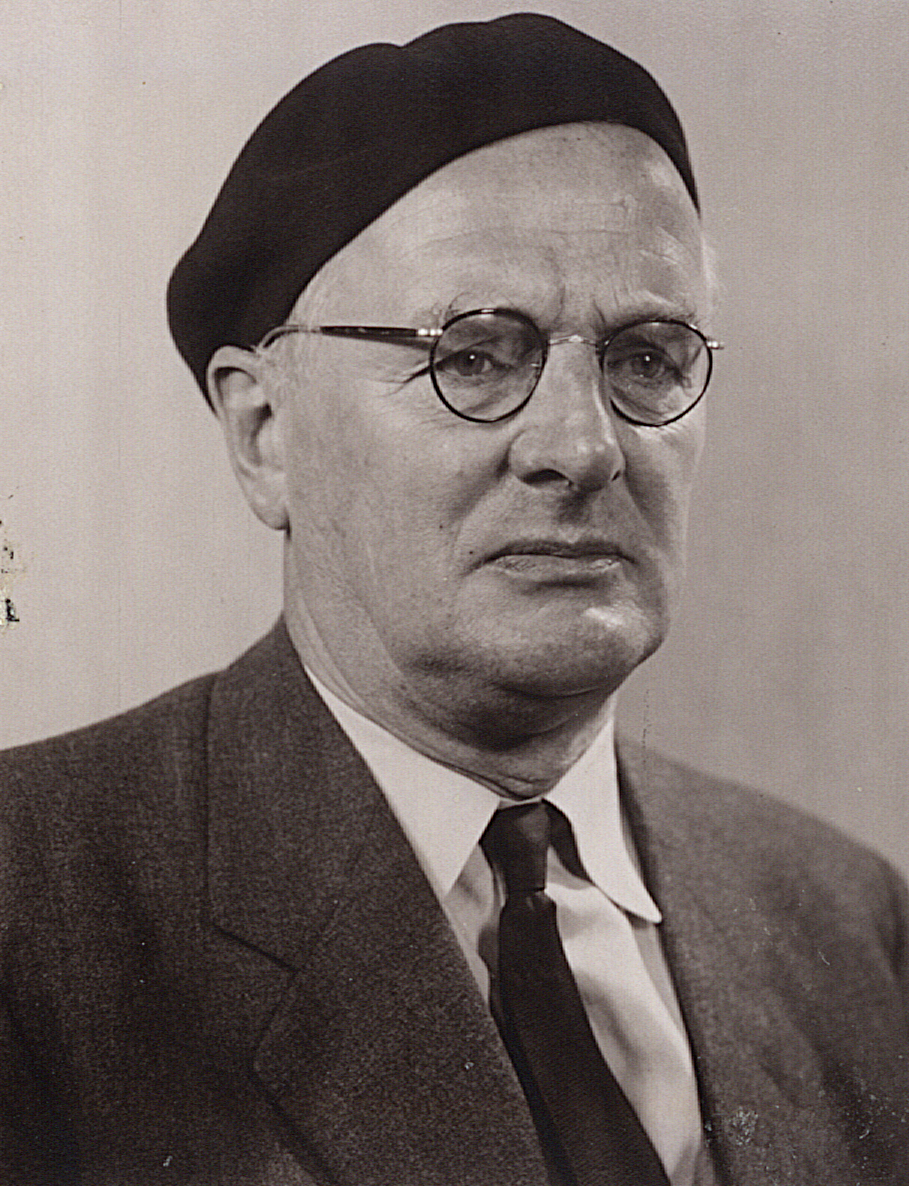
- Otto Baumberger, photographed in 1950.
- Born: 21 May 1889; Altstetten, Zurich, Switzerland
- Died: 26 December 1961 (aged 72); Weiningen, Zurich, Switzerland
- Education: Kunstgewerbeschule Zürich; Académie Colarossi; Académie de la Grande Chaumière
- Known for: Painting, graphic art, poster design
- Notable work: Marque PKZ (1923)
- Movement: Swiss Expressionism

Otto Baumberger (21 May 1889 – 26 December 1961) was a Swiss painter, graphic artist and poster designer. Associated with Swiss Expressionism, he became best known for his graphic work and posters, designing more than 200 posters across a wide range of styles. He taught design and drawing at ETH Zurich. His 1923 poster Marque PKZ is regarded as a classic of Swiss poster art.

== Biography ==
Otto Baumberger was born in Altstetten, now part of Zurich, on 21 May 1889. He left a textile-design apprenticeship early and trained as a lithographer at the Graphisches Atelier Emil Winter in Zurich. He later studied in Zurich, Munich and Paris, including at the Kunstgewerbeschule Zürich, the Académie Colarossi and the Académie de la Grande Chaumière. He first exhibited with the Zürcher Kunstgesellschaft in 1910.

From 1911, Baumberger worked with the Zurich graphic workshop J. E. Wolfensberger. He taught at the Kunstgewerbeschule Zürich from 1916 and worked in Berlin in 1920 on stage designs commissioned by Max Reinhardt.

From 1931, he held a teaching post in the architecture department at ETH Zurich, where he taught colour in relation to architecture and space. He was appointed associate professor of design and drawing in 1947. Exhibitions of his work were held at Kunsthaus Zürich in 1949 and at the Graphische Sammlung of ETH Zurich in 1959.

Baumberger died in Weiningen, Zurich, on 26 December 1961.

== Work ==
Baumberger worked in painting, drawing, graphic art, illustration, stage design and poster art. He became best known for his graphic work and posters, and is considered an important figure of Swiss Expressionism.

His posters and other graphic work were influenced by Art Nouveau, Art Deco and New Objectivity. He designed more than 200 posters in different styles. His 1923 poster Marque PKZ, made for the Zurich clothing store Burger-Kehl & Co., shows the collar and part of a man’s jacket, including the herringbone fabric and label. This poster is regarded as a classic of Swiss poster art. It is an example of a Sachplakat, or “object poster”, an advertisement centred on a single object.
