= Otto Geigenberger =

German painter

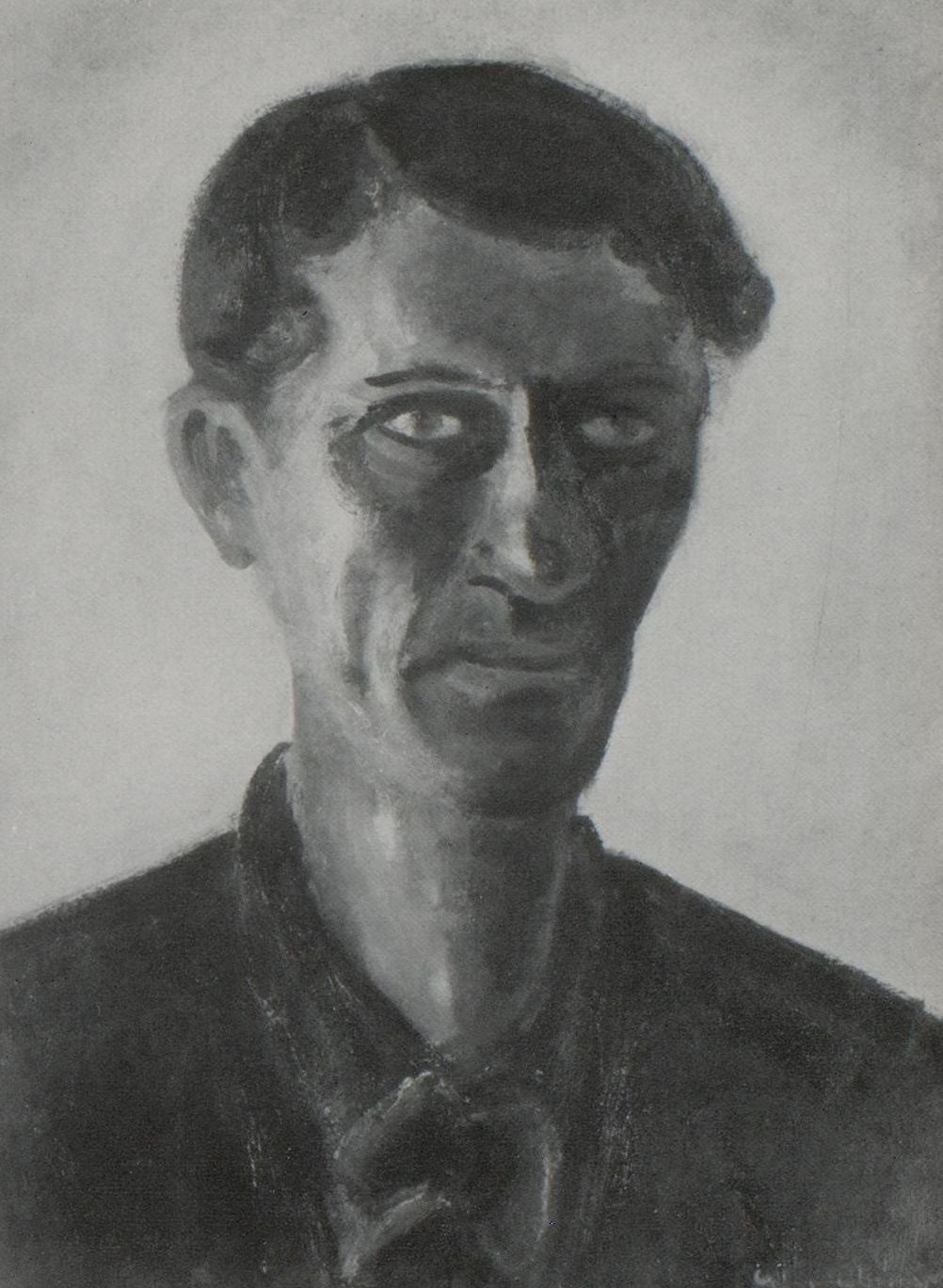

Otto Geigenberger (6 June 1881 – 6 July 1946) was a German painter.

== Life ==
He was one of the six children of the sculptor Heinrich Geigenberger. Of the family, Paul became a sculptor, and August a well-known caricaturist and illustrator. The twins Anneliese and Hanns-Otto (children of Otto Geigenberger) were born in 1914 and later studied painting and graphic art at the Munich Academy.

Otto Geigenberger studied in Munich with Professor Maximilian Dasio and at the Polytechnic (drawing teacher's diploma). After a short period of teaching in Oberammergau and Berchtesgaden he settled in Munich in 1905 as a freelance teacher of painting, and married.

He travelled quite a lot for study purposes: six months in Paris, a year in Rome, also visits to the south of France, Luxembourg, Belgium, the Netherlands, Austria and above all Italy, where every year he painted watercolours in the most varied places. He worked these up in his studio into oil paintings, through which he became known not only in Munich and Germany but also internationally.

His work has been extensively exhibited in both one-man and group exhibitions.

His works are owned by many national and municipal museums and by many private collectors inside and outside Germany.

Geigenberger was awarded the scarce Albrecht Dürer Medal, the Rome Prize and the Prize of the German Artists' Union.. He belonged to the Munich Secession, the Berlin Secession, the Prussian Academy of the Arts, the Association of Berlin Artists and from 1945 the Neue Gruppe München and the Ulm Artists' Guild.

Among his closer artist friends were Joseph Kutter, Anton Kerschbaumer, Julius Sailer, Florian Bosch, Max Liebermann, Bernhard Bleeker, L W Grossmann, Konstantin Garneff, Max Arthur Stremel and Leo Putz. His style was an example for many German painters. In 1943 he was condemned to a total ban on all painting and sales of his works. Nevertheless at the exhibition Deutsche Künstler und die SS ("German Artists and the SS") in 1944 in Breslau his picture Hünengrab in der Heide bei Fallingbostel was exhibited, as were several of his works at the subsequent exhibition of the same name in Salzburg.

He died unexpectedly after an operation in Ulm on 6 July 1946.

There are streets named after Otto Geigenberger in Munich and Wasserburg am Inn.

== See also ==
- List of German painters
- Worth to see: some of his paintings at Wikimedia Commons
