= Maximilian Dasio =

German painter (1865–1954)

Maximilian Dasio (28 February 1865 – 17 August 1954) was a German painter and medal engraver.

== Life ==
Dasio was born in Munich and studied at the Munich Academy of Fine Arts. From 1891 he worked independently as an artist and directed a private school for graphic and applied arts. From 1896 to 1901 he taught at the Münchner Künstlerinnenverein ("Munich Association of Women Artists"). In 1902 he was appointed a professor at the Königliche Kunstgewerbeschule, in 1910 a civil servant with the rank of Regierungs- und Studienrat in the Bavarian Royal Ministry of the Interior for Church and School Affairs (Kgl. Ministerium des Inneren für Kirchen- und Schulangelegenheiten in Bayern) and in 1920 a senior civil servant with the rank of Ministerialrat in the Bavarian State Ministry for Education and Culture (Bayerisches Staatsministerium für Unterricht und Kultus).

He died in 1954 in Oberammergau.

Dasio's pupils included Otto Geigenberger, Ludwig Gies, Hans Rudi Erdt, Friedrich Jossé, Anton Kerschbaumer, Berta Katharina Lassen, Else Oppler-Legband, Karl Friedrich Roth and Anna Feldhusen.

== Published works ==
- Der Teufel: Zwanzig Variationen in Holzschnitten: portfolio of hand=printed woodcuts. 50 numbered sets published 1919 by Die Heimkehr Verlag, München-Pasing

== Bibliography ==
- Weber, Ingrid S[z].- (1985): Maximilian Dasio 1865–1954. Münchner Maler, Medailleur und Ministerialrat. München: Staatliche Münzsammlung ISBN 3-9800744-1-2

== See also ==
- list of German painters
