= Das Plakat (magazine) =

Design magazine in Weimar Germany (1910–1922)

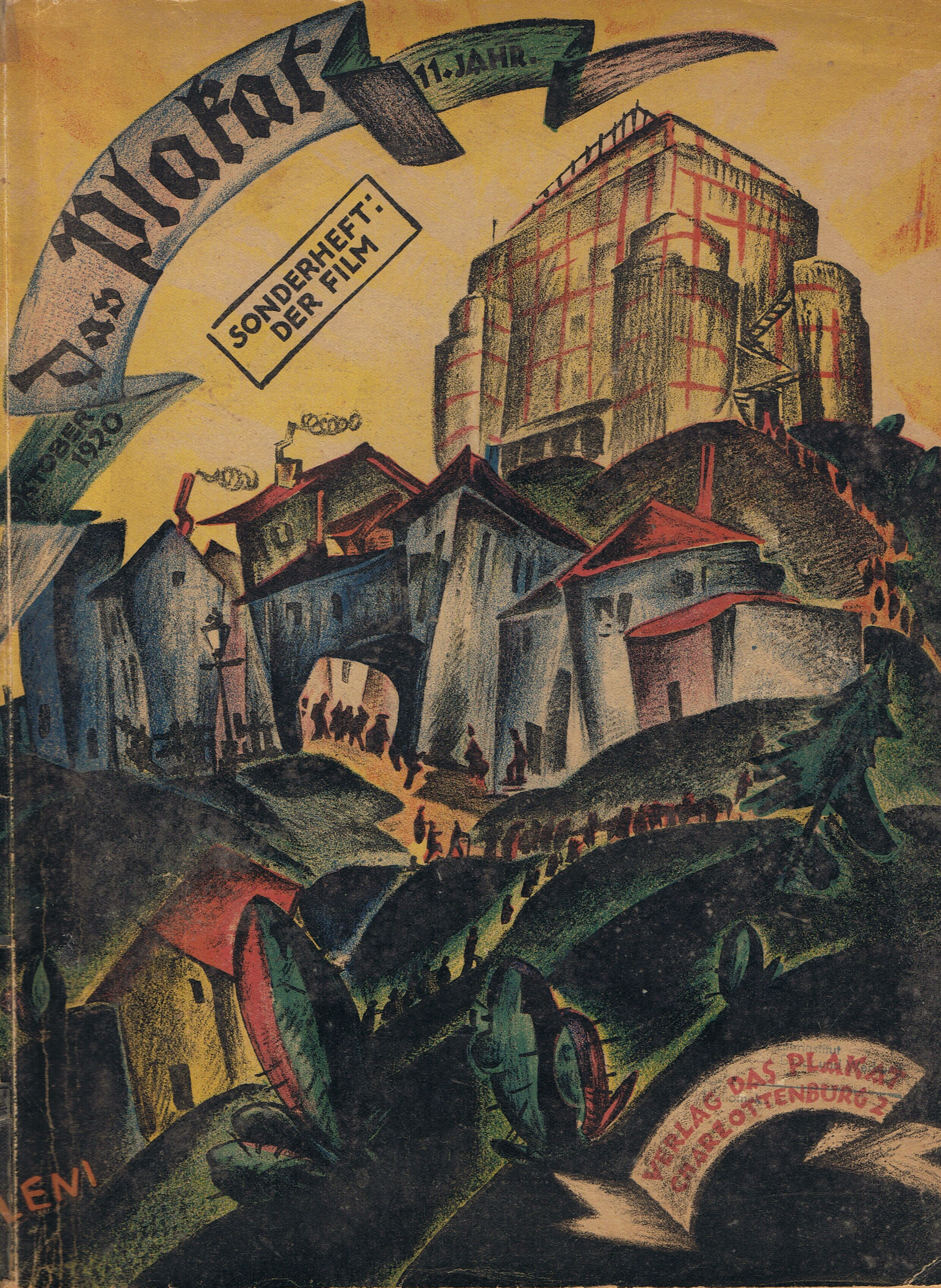
- Cover page of the magazine dated 1920
- Editor-in-chief: Hans Sachs
- Categories: Design magazine
- Publisher: Verlag Das Plakat; Verlag Max Chiliburger
- Founder: Hans Sachs
- Founded: 1910
- Final issue: 1922
- Country: Weimar Germany
- Based in: Berlin
- Language: German

Das Plakat (German: The Poster) was a design and art magazine published from 1910 to 1922 in Berlin, Weimar Germany. It was one of the early and influential publications on the art of posters and commercial art.

== History and profile ==
Das Plakat was started by Hans Sachs in 1910. Its founding publisher was the Verlag Das Plakat based in Berlin. Between 1912 and 1921 it was published by Verlag Max Chiliburger. The company was managed by Hans Sachs on instruction of the Verein der Plakatfreunde (German: Association of friends of the poster) as the official media outlet of the association. Sachs also edited the magazine which focused on the production of posters. It also published the early examples of the political pictorial maps in November 1915. These were the reproductions of two political cartoon maps of Europe which had been produced by Paul Hadol in 1870 and by Walter Trier. Heinrich Inheim and Ernst Carl Bauer were among its contributors.

Das Plakat sold only 200 copies at the beginning, but later it managed to sell 5,000 copies. It ceased publication in 1922.

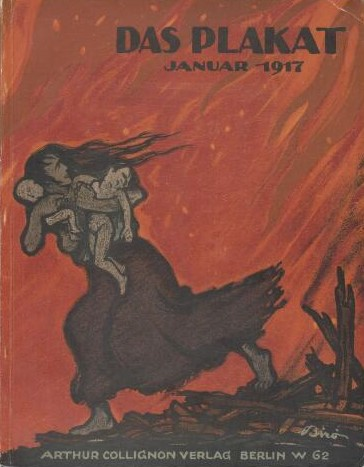
Das Plakat cover image dated January 1917 by Mihály Bíró, in times of World War I
