= Julius E. F. Gipkens =

German painter, illustrator and graphic designer

Julius E. F. Gipkens (16 February 1883 – 1968) was a German painter, illustrator and graphic designer.

== Early life and career ==
Julius Gipkens was born in Hannover, Germany. Gipkens was self-taught and found inspiration in Lucian Bernhard's work, eventually contributing greatly to the Sachplakat (Plakatstil) style himself. Gipkens moved to Berlin and started working. Alongside Lucian Bernhard, Hans Rudi Erdt and Julius Klinger he was employed on an exclusive contract with Hollerbaum & Schmidt. He created posters for Germany during World War I. After the war, he created illustrations for advertising and design firms, and newspapers. He immigrated to the United States in 1933.

== Notable works ==
=== Typefaces ===
- Admiral (1906)
- Admiral Halbfett (1906)
- Femina (1913)
- Majestic (1914)

== Death and legacy ==
He died in New York City. His work is held in the collections of the Library of Congress and Victoria & Albert Museum.

== See also ==
- List of German painters
