= Alain Weill (art critic) =

French art critic

- Born: September 7, 1946 (age 79); Paris, France
- Education: École pratique des hautes études
- Occupations: Art critic, essayist, collector

Alain Weill (born 7 September 1946) is a French expert in graphic design and advertising, a specialist on posters, art critic and collector.

== Biography ==
Alain Weill attended the École pratique des hautes études and then he studied legal science. He obtained two master's degrees: semiology and sociology of art.

As an essayist, Alain Weill has authored many books and exhibition catalogues dedicated to graphic arts and advertising posters. He is an expert in graphic arts and advertising creation, notably with the company of auctioneers. He is also a food critic, and a founding member of the Council of Culinary Arts.

He is a former director of the Musée de la Publicité in Paris (1971–1983) and was artistic director of the Festival international de l'affiche et du graphisme de Chaumont from 1990 to 2001. He is the jury president of the European Advertising Award.

== Selected publications ==
- Art Nouveau Postcards: The Posterists' Postcards, Images Graphiques, 1977
- 100 Years of Posters of the Folies Bergère and Music Halls of Paris, Images Graphiques, 1977
- Co-author with Jack Rennert, Alphonse Mucha: The Complete Posters and Panels, G. K. Hall & Co., 1984
- The Poster: A Worldwide Survey and History, G. K. Hall & Co., 1985
- Parisian Fashion : La Gazette du Bon Ton (1912–1925), Bibliothèque de l'Image, 2000
- Co-author with Israel Perry, Chocolate Posters, Queen Art Publishers, 2002
- Le Design graphique, collection « Découvertes Gallimard » (nº 439), série Arts. Éditions Gallimard, 2003
  - US edition – Graphic Design: A History, "Abrams Discoveries" series. Harry N. Abrams, 2004
  - UK edition – Graphics: A Century of Poster and Advertising Design, 'New Horizons' series. Thames & Hudson, 2004
- Masters of the Poster 1900, Posters Please, 2003
- Mirande Carnévalé-Mauzan, preface by Alain Weill – The posters of Mauzan, Square One Publishing, 2008
- The Art Nouveau Poster, Frances Lincoln Publishers, 2015

Collective work

- AA.VV., Les années 20 : L'âge des métropoles, « Livres d'Art ». Gallimard and Musée des beaux-arts de Montréal, 1991
- AA.VV., Gunter Rambow – Plakate / Posters (in German), Edition Axel Menges, 2008
