= Edmund Edel =

19th-century German painter

Edmund Edel was a 19th-century German painter, illustrator, draughtsman, and writer.

== Biography ==
Edel was born on 10 September 1863 in Stolp, Germany (today Słupsk, Poland). He received his artistic training at the Academy of Fine Arts, Munich and the Académie Julian in Paris.

After his studies, Edel settled in Berlin where he specialized in painting and illustration. His work was primarily featured in humorous reviews, and he gained a reputation for his distinctive poster art.

== Posters ==
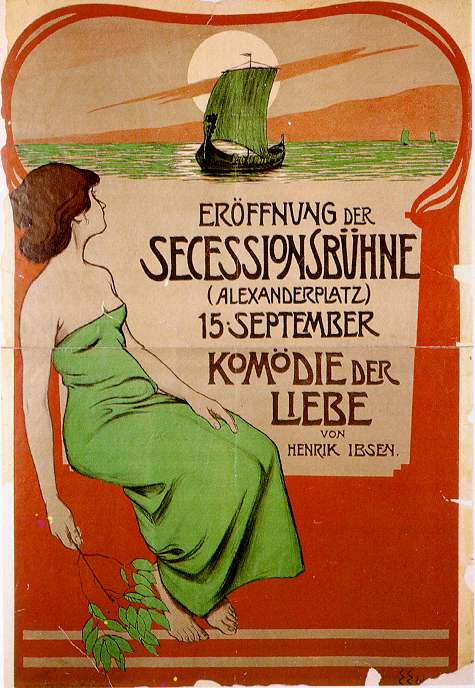

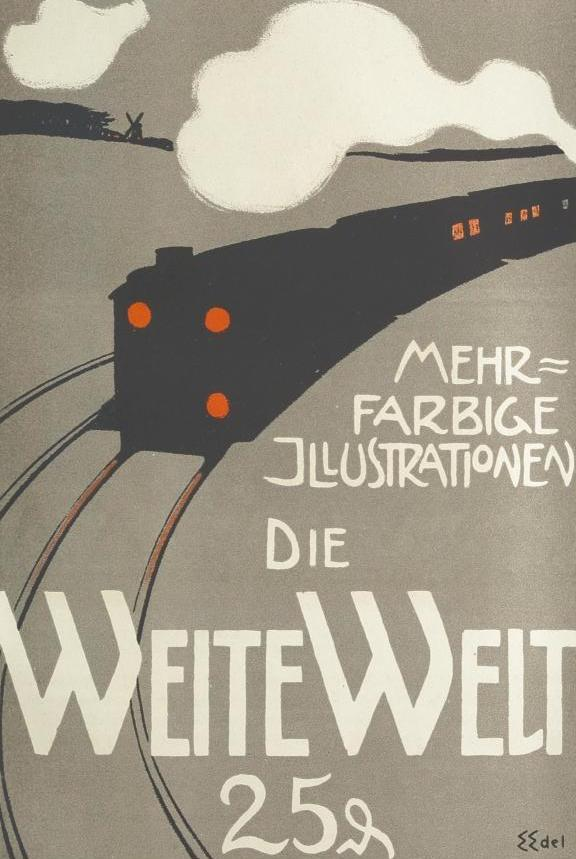

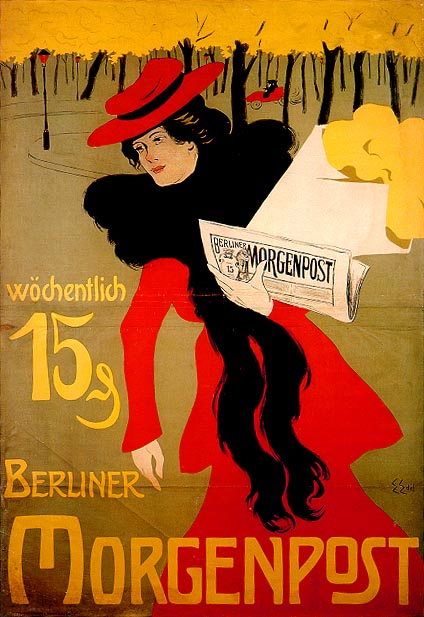
