= Paul Scheurich =

German graphic designer, incl. porcelain and banknote designer

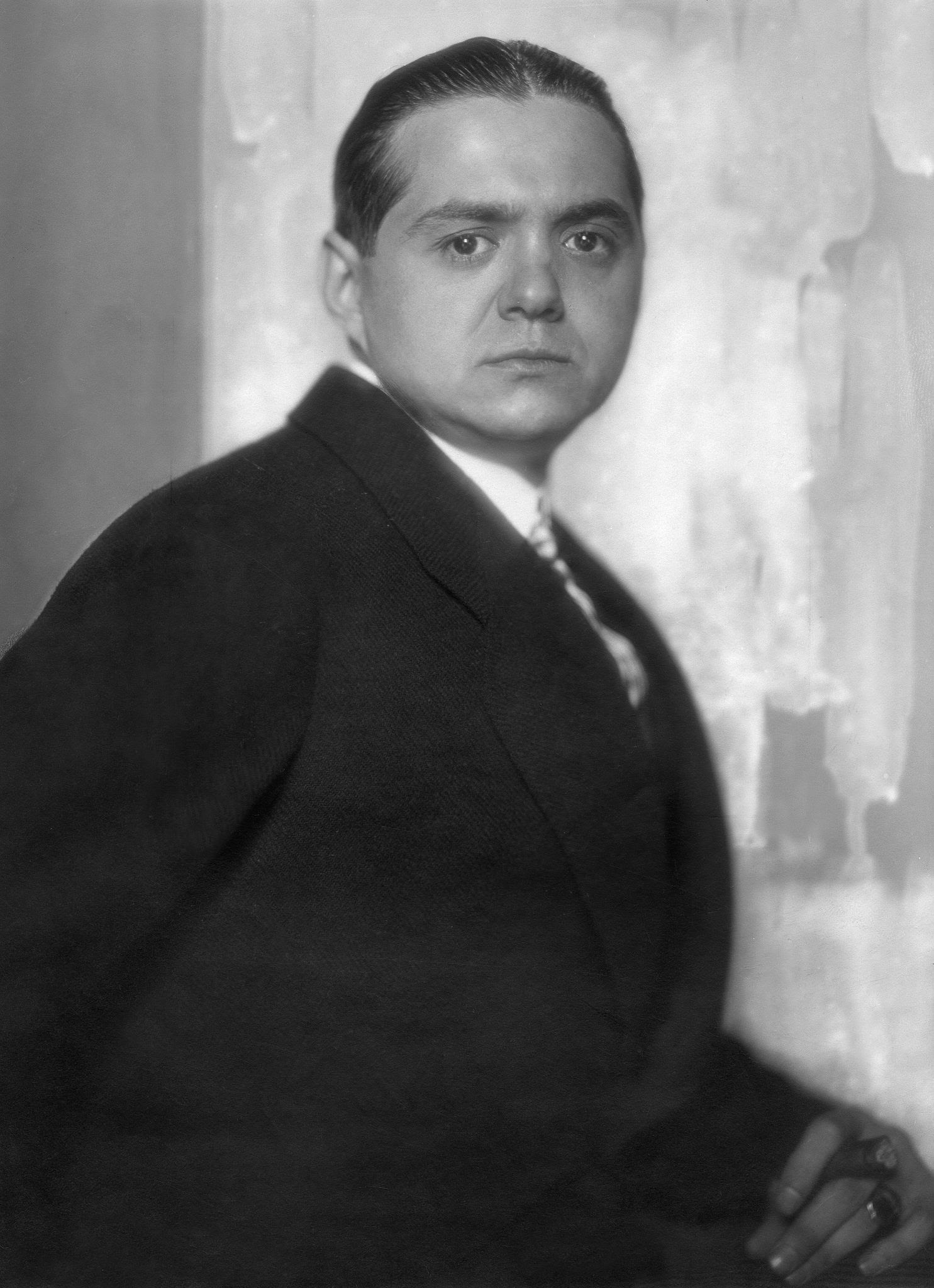
Paul Scheurich (c. 1920). Photograph by Nicola Perscheid

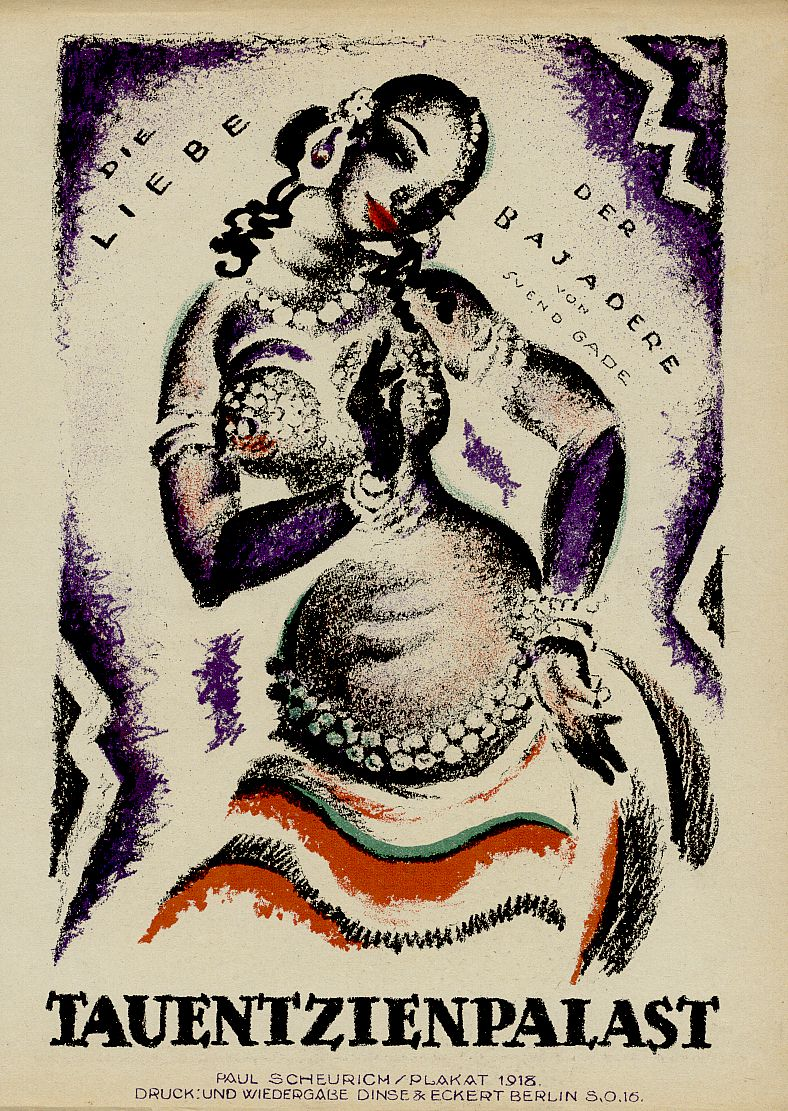
Poster for the silent film Die Liebe der Bajadere (1918)

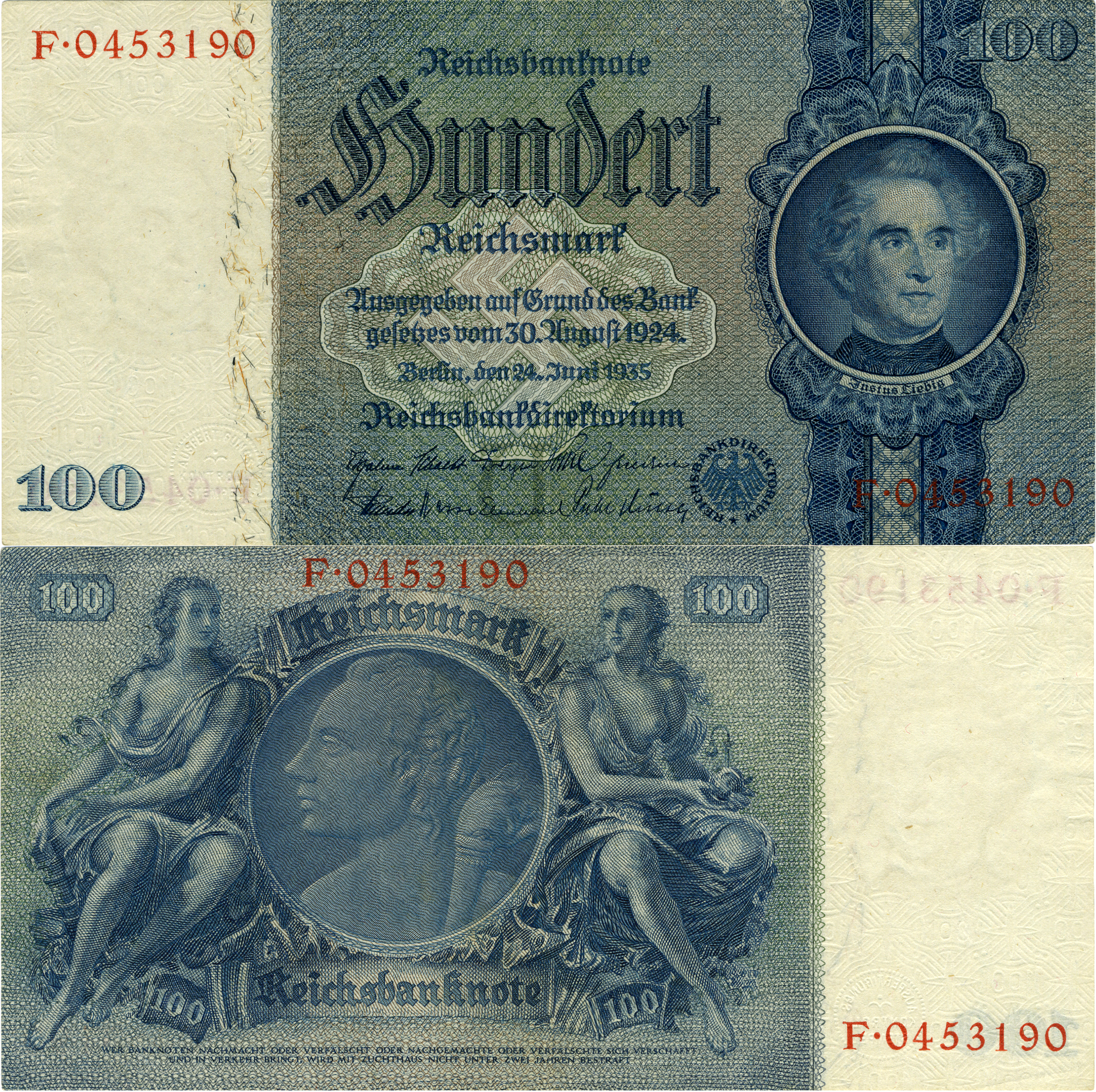
Scheurich designed this 1935 100 Reichsmark banknote portraying scientist Justus von Liebig as well as a Nazi swastika below the word Hundert

Paul Scheurich (24 October 1883 – 19 September 1945) was a German painter, graphic artist, sculptor, and ceramic designer. He is regarded as one of the most significant porcelain artists of the first half of the 20th century and has been described as the most important porcelain modeller of the twentieth century.

== Biography and career ==
Scheurich was born in New York City in 1883; his family returned to Germany the following year. He studied at the Berlin Academy of Arts between 1900 and 1902.

=== Early career and graphic work ===
Scheurich worked across multiple media, including painting, sculpture, illustration, and stage design.

In 1907, he illustrated an antisemitic pamphlet titled Moses-Theater. By the early 1910s, he was active in Berlin's dynamic art scene, contributing to its flourishing culture of theater, fashion, and design.

Around 1913, he designed stage sets for Max Reinhardt and later produced costume and production designs for theater and film.

Scheurich became a prolific illustrator, contributing over 100 works to the satirical magazine Simplicissimus between 1931 and 1938, as well as producing drawings for magazines such as Die Dame and Sport im Bild.^{[de]}

A contemporary profile in Gebrauchsgraphik^{[de]} (1936) emphasized his versatility and prominence as a commercial graphic artist in interwar Germany.

His prints are often identifiable by a monogram "P S" within a vertical rectangle.

=== Porcelain design ===
Scheurich began designing porcelain around 1910–1912 at the Schwarzburger Werkstätten.^{[de]} He later worked with the Nymphenburg Porcelain Manufactory, KPM (Royal Porcelain Factory) Berlin, Hutschenreuther, and Staatliche Majolika Manufaktur^{[de]} in Karlsruhe, before establishing his reputation at the Meissen Porcelain Manufactory.

Between 1918 and 1936, Scheurich held an exclusive contract and a professorship at Meissen, where he produced figurative models influenced by Rococo traditions.

His work reinterpreted 18th-century porcelain motifs while introducing modern thematic elements, often drawing from theater and ballet. Modern scholarship has highlighted the influence of stage performance and dance, including Ballets Russes-inspired figures, on his porcelain compositions.

His porcelain figures are characterized by expressive movement, refined modeling, and themes drawn from mythology, theater, and contemporary life.

Collections databases, including those of international museums, document a wide range of his figurative works, confirming their global distribution and continued institutional relevance.

He later returned to Königliche Porzellan-Manufaktur zu Meissen (KPM) in 1939 when Max Adolf Pfeiffer^{[de]} became its director.

=== Painting and decorative work ===
Scheurich worked in pastels, oil, and watercolor, producing portraits, interiors, and large-scale decorative commissions. His projects included murals, ceiling decorations, stained glass, and tapestry designs, though much of this work was destroyed during the Second World War.

In 1935, he created the stage curtain for the Deutsche Oper Berlin and a tapestry for the Reich Ministry of Public Enlightenment and Propaganda.

=== Banknote design ===
Beginning in 1929, the Reichsbank issued banknotes based on Scheurich's designs. His work in this field reflects the extension of his graphic style into official state visual culture.

=== Later career and Nazi era ===
Scheurich remained active during Nazi Germany, participating in official exhibitions including the Exposition Internationale des Arts et Techniques dans la Vie Moderne (Paris, 1937) and the 1939 Great German Art Exhibition in Munich.

A biographical entry in the Schlesien academic series situates his career within broader German cultural developments of the early 20th century.

== Style and influence ==
Scheurich's work combined classical influences with modern sensibilities, adapting traditional porcelain motifs into new contexts rather than directly imitating historical styles.

His artistic language bridged decorative arts, graphic design, and theatrical aesthetics, with particular emphasis on movement, elegance, and narrative composition.

== Legacy ==
Scheurich's works are held in major international museum collections.

Institutional collections, including those documented by the Museum of Applied Arts in Budapest, Hungary and the International Center of Photography in New York, preserve both his sculptural and graphic works, reflecting the breadth of his practice.

== Death ==
Scheurich died in 1945 in Brandenburg an der Havel, a small historic city in Brandenburg state, about 68 kilometres (42 mi) west of the center of Berlin.

== Literature ==
- Eberhard Hölscher: Prof. Paul Scheurich. In: Gebrauchsgraphik, Vol. 13 (1936), Issue 2, pp. 14–29.
- Max Adolf Pfeiffer: Schönheit in Porzellan. In: Die Kunst im Dritten Reich, Vol. 5 (1941), Issue 6.
- Meissen Porzellan Stiftung (ed.): Paul Scheurich. Dresden, 2022.
