= Lucian Bernhard =

German artist

- Bernhard in 1955

Lucian Bernhard (born Emil Kahn, March 15, 1883 – May 29, 1972) was a German graphic designer, type designer, professor, interior designer, and artist during the first half of the twentieth century.

== Career ==
Bernhard's attention-grabbing poster for Priester matches (c. 1906). (Note: Different sources give 1905 or 6.) Bernhard reduced advertising to a minimal picture and a wordmark in wobbly bold lettering. The style became very influential.

Bernhard was influential in helping create the design style known as Plakatstil (Poster Style), which used reductive imagery and flat-color as well as Sachplakat ('object poster') which restricted the image to simply the object being advertised and the brand name. He was also known for his designs for Stiller shoes, Manoli cigarettes, and Priester matches.

Though he studied briefly at the Akademie in Munich, he was largely self-taught. He moved to Berlin in 1901 where he worked as a poster designer and art director for magazines. Around the beginning of World War 1, Bernhard, among other artists, contributed greatly to instilling support for the war effort in German civilians through propaganda. His posters, following Plakatstil, allowed for a clear and direct message to the audience that bolstered nationalism through depictions of the current enemy in a "them versus us" mentality. In 1920, he became a professor at the Akademie der Künste until 1923, when he emigrated to New York City. In 1928, he opened the Contempora Studio with Rockwell Kent, Paul Poiret, Bruno Paul, and Erich Mendelsohn where he worked as a graphic artist and interior designer. In Germany, Bernhard's typefaces were initially favored by the Nazi Party, but were later banned under the mistaken assumption that he was Jewish (largely due to his Jewish-sounding birth name). Later in life, Bernhard worked primarily as a painter and sculptor until his death on May 29, 1972.

== Personal life ==
Emil Kahn was born in Cannstatt, now a district of Stuttgart, Germany, on March 15, 1883. He changed his name to Lucian Bernhard in 1905. His first name is often spelled Lucien.

Lucian Bernhard was the father of the photographer Ruth Bernhard.

== See also ==
- List of AIGA medalists
