= Kid Canfield =

American gambler and confidence trickster

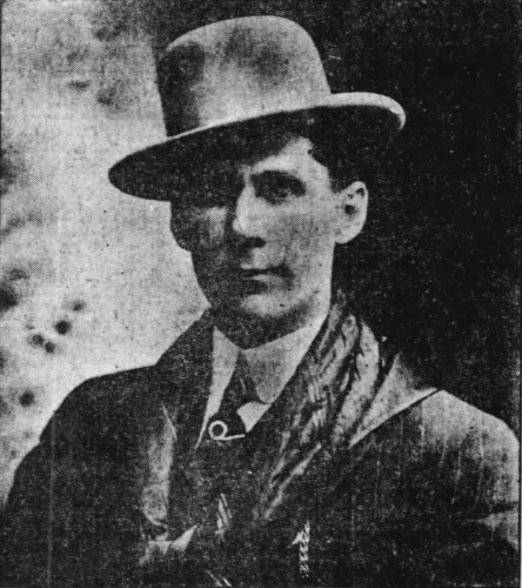
Kid Canfield from a 1925 advertisement

George Washington Bonner (1878 – March 12, 1935), popularly known as Kid Canfield, was an American gambler and confidence trickster who later reformed and made a series of lectures and two films on the prevalence of cheating in gambling. Born in a small village near Columbus, Ohio, Canfield learned to gamble in his family's hotel. After a period running fixed three-card Monte games at circuses, he traveled the United States to play high-stakes card games. Canfield claimed to have played with gangsters such as Arnold Rothstein, Legs Diamond, and Al Capone and to have won $350,000 from Rothstein in a single session.

By 1910 Canfield had ended his gambling career and was touring the vaudeville circuit with a show recounting his story and revealing his methods of cheating. He published chapbooks on the subject and, in 1912, appeared in a two-reel silent film depicting his life and cheating methods. He starred in a second film in 1922, five reels long and on a similar subject matter set around a Western theme. Canfield continued his vaudeville act until 1935 when he died while making a promotional radio broadcast on WHIS in Bluefield, West Virginia.

== Gambling career ==
Kid Canfield was born as George Washington Bonner in 1878 in a small village near Columbus, Ohio. His parents owned a hotel, and it was there that he learned to gamble. His nickname "Kid Canfield" possibly derives from Richard Albert Canfield (1855–1914), a prominent participant in illegal gambling in the northeastern United States and who became known as the "Prince of Gamblers". Kid Canfield later worked in circuses as a confidence trickster, playing fixed games of three-card Monte. Canfield moved to Chicago by the age of 17 when he left the city to tour the country playing high-stakes card games. Canfield used cheating techniques in his gambling career including loaded dice, card marking, and bottom dealing. He claimed to have played with gangsters such as Arnold Rothstein, Legs Diamond, and Al Capone and to have cheated Rothstein out of $350,000 in a single session by using marked cards. Canfield also claimed to have set up a gambling hall in San Francisco, one of the largest in the country.

== Reform ==
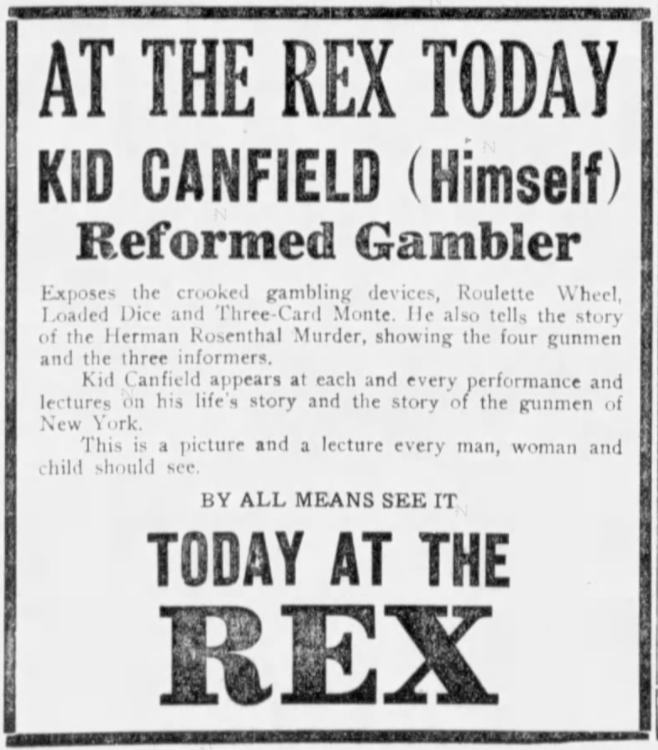
Advert for a Kid Canfield show in Fort Worth, Texas, 1915

Canfield claimed to have stopped his gambling career after one mark committed suicide with a gun at the end of a 28-hour poker game in which he had lost $20,000. Canfield further claimed this man was his estranged brother, whom he had recognized because he was holding a photograph of their mother when he died. By 1910 Canfield was touring the vaudeville circuit with a show that denounced gambling, described his career, and demonstrated the methods he used to cheat. In 1911, Canfield published at least two editions of a chapbook entitled Kid Canfield: The Reformed Confidence Man and Gambler. Canfield's vaudeville show led to a 1912 two-reel silent film, Kid Canfield, The Notorious Gambler, in which Canfield starred. The first reel of the film was biographical, ending with the suicide of his brother, while the second reel was an exposé of his cheating methods. The publicity material for the film promised that it would demonstrate "the dishonest methods by which the victims are fleeced in gambling dens" and that it was "a distinctly educational feature".

In 1915, he was billed as presenting a show in person that played a three-reel film that included his biography and featured Baldy Jack Rose, Sam Schepps, and Harry Vallon, mob figures turned police informants in the 1912 Rosenthal murder case. The film also included footage of four of the murderers who posed for the cameras before their executions. In 1922, Canfield starred in a full-length, five-reel silent film for the E. R. Champion Film Distributing Company, Kid Canfield, the Reform Gambler. The film was described as a "semi-documentary" but had a Western theme.

By 1935 he was still involved in vaudeville. One of his gimmicks was to walk into the local newspaper office and challenge the journalists to gambling games, with the stake being a good review of his show. The Bluefield Daily Telegraph of West Virginia described one such occasion on March 9, 1935, saying, "Kid Canfield with his long tapered fingers, resembling a piano player's, could manipulate a deck of cards so fast that the eye was unable to follow his movement".

== Death ==
On March 12, 1935, Canfield appeared on local radio station WHIS to promote his show, his first ever radio appearance. Canfield was visibly nervous but began an enthusiastic sales pitch for his show. However, after speaking the words "gambling does not pay! It is a game run by professional crooks. Boys, let me tell you a story..." he collapsed to the floor. He managed to rise to his feet but fell once more, this time bringing the radio microphone down with him. WHIS staff carried him to a couch and called for a doctor. Canfield, aged 57, died from a heart attack within a minute of falling to the floor, becoming the first person known to have died while broadcasting on radio. After a brief period of confusion, a station employee put on a record of dance music, which played on repeat until midnight that night.
