= Sam Paul =

American gambler and underworld figure

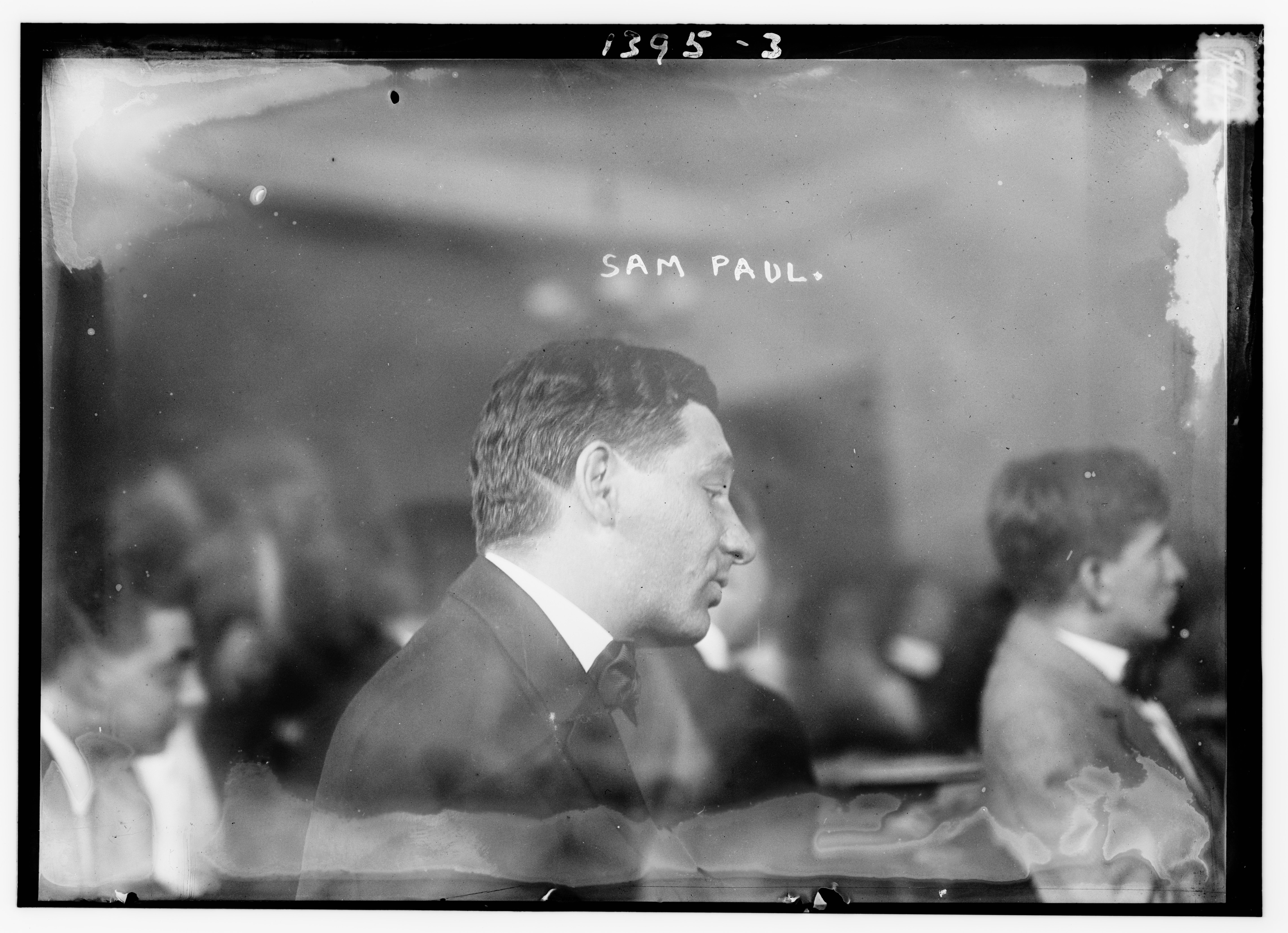
- Born: 1874
- Died: January 10, 1927 (aged 53); Manhattan, New York, United States
- Resting place: Mount Hebron Cemetery
- Occupation: Gambler
- Known for: Tammany Hall Entrepreneur
- Spouse: Lena Solomon
- Children: 1

Sam Paul (1874 – January 10, 1927) was an American gambler and underworld figure in New York City at the start of the 20th century. Founder of the Sam Paul Association, he was also a major political organizer for Tammany Hall.

== The Rosenthal case and before ==
By 1903, the "Sam Paul Association" was already being mentioned in the news as a center of criminal activity in New York. By 1910, Paul was running a pool hall at the corner of Third Avenue and 13th Street in partnership with Louis Kaufman.

Paul was initially sought by police as a witness in the killing of gambler Herman Rosenthal, as they had received information that the crime had been planned at the Sam Paul Association clubhouse at Sea Gate, Brooklyn on July 14, 1912, by Jack Rose, Bridgie Webber, and a man known only as "Dollar John." However, on July 21, Paul was arrested as a suspect. He maintained his innocence, claiming he had been home in bed at the night of the murder and that, rather than having been involved with Rosenthal's death, he had paid for Rosenthal's funeral. The charges were dropped after Paul provided the police with an alibi.

Paul's arrest prompted New York Times reporters to interview members of the Sam Paul Association at 37 E. 7th Street about the membership and purpose of the organization. A member, who did not give his name, stated that:

The papers have given the impression that the Sam Paul Association has been the headquarters for a lot of plotters and lawbreakers. As a matter of fact, there are a lot of respectable business men, lawyers, doctors, and others in our membership. I myself am a tailor. That man on your right is a government official. Of course, some of the members are in sporting lines, but the proportion is about half and half ... For some reason or other, Sam Paul and the Sam Paul association have to take the knocks for everything that goes wrong. Every time a gaming joint is raided, the papers say it is supposed to have been one of Sam Paul's, and lately every time a crime has been committed they say it was planned here at the clubrooms, and every man the police arrest is said to be a member of the Sam Paul Association. And all this, when as a matter of fact this is only a social club and dining room, and Sam Paul is one of the nicest fellows, and one of the most charitable men in New York. He wouldn't hurt a fly.

Paul and Webber, who together ran the popular Sans Souci Music Hall on Third Avenue at 13th Street, had previously been involved in a violent dispute with Rosenthal after Rosenthal arranged a New York City Police Department raid on that club and subsequently took over the nearby Hesper Club on Second Avenue. Their rivalry eventually resulted in Webber being attacked and severely beaten by two members of Jack Zelig's criminal organization. Zelig was called "the right hand man of Sam Paul" by The New York Times.

When Harry Horowitz and Lefty Louis Rosenberg were arrested in September 1912 and charged with killing Rosenthal, rumors circulated to the effect that Paul had paid for their attorney, former magistrate Charles Wahle. Horowitz, Rosenberg, Wahle, and Paul denied that this was the case. Paul was held as a material witness and was one of several gangland figures who testified at the trial of Charles Becker later that year. Partly as a result of his testimony, Becker was convicted of Rosenthal's murder and was executed in 1915. He is the only New York City police officer to have been executed.

As a result of the publicity created by the Rosenthal murder, NYC Police Commissioner Rhinelander Waldo opened an investigation into Sam Paul, the Sam Paul Association, and their connections with government officials at various levels. He supplied New York City mayor William Jay Gaynor with a list of 62 names of alleged members of the Association. The investigation linked Paul with politicians, including Samuel S. Koenig and his brother Morris. According to the New York Times report:

Paul is said to be a follower of the political fortunes of Samuel S. Koenig, Chairman of the Republican County Committee, whose home is on the east side. He is also said to be the head of a powerful gang of knife and gun fighters.

Both Koenigs denied these allegations. In separate statements the brothers mentioned Paul's membership in Tammany Hall as probative of their claims that Paul was a member of the Democratic Party, and, as such, unlikely to have associated with them.

== After the Rosenthal case ==
Paul married after the trial and had a daughter, Dorothy, who was born in 1918. After his first wife died, Paul married Lena Solomon. Although he had amassed a considerable fortune during his life (earning thousands from poolrooms, cafes, cabaret, restaurants and other establishments), Paul worked as a manager for a cabaret club in his later years and was nearly bankrupt according to a number of his associates in East Side Manhattan. He remarked to Sigmund Schwartz, a personal friend and owner of Schwartz's Undertaking Parlors, "You'll get me pretty soon, now. My health is gone and so is my money". Indeed, Paul was seriously ill for three weeks before his death from nephritis at his East Eighteenth Street home on January 10, 1927. His funeral was held the following morning at Schwartz's parlor on Fifth Street, near Second Avenue, and buried at Mount Hebron Cemetery. According to The New York Times, 2000 people attended Paul's funeral. Illiam Berkowitz, a friend of Paul's, was quoted as saying that Paul was a "square gambler and a philanthropist."
