= George S. Dougherty =

American detective and author

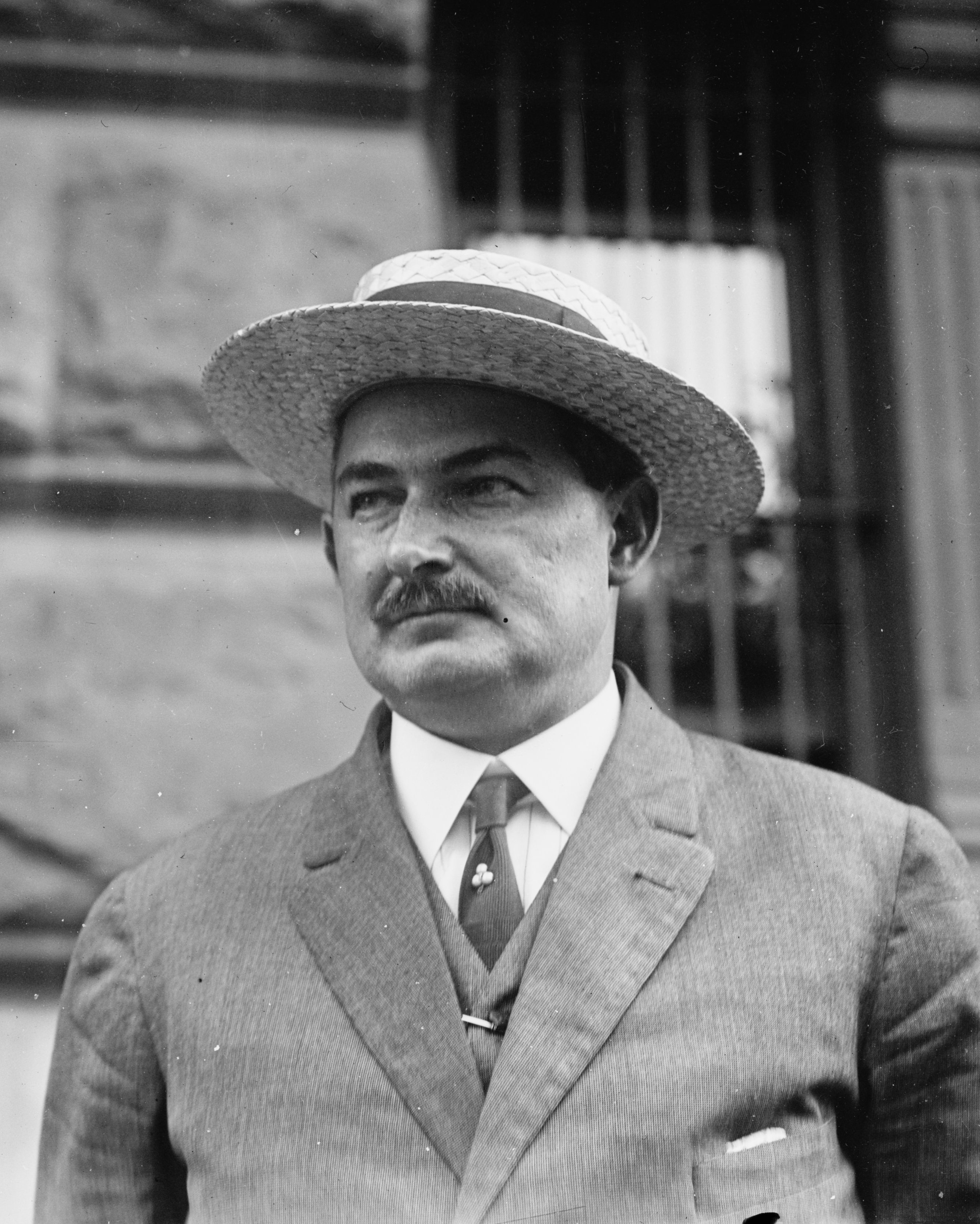
- Dougherty c. 1913
- Born: April 5, 1865; Cressona, Pennsylvania, United States
- Died: July 16, 1931 (aged 66); Flushing, Queens, New York, United States
- Resting place: Cypress Hills Cemetery
- Occupations: NYPD police official, Pinkerton detective and crime writer
- Known for: Private detective for the Pinkerton Detective Agency from 1888–1911; served as Second Deputy Police Commissioner and headed of the NYPD Detectives Bureau from 1911–1913.
- Parent(s): Charles A. Dougherty and Ellen June
- Relatives: Harry Dougherty, brother Arthur Dougherty, brother

George Samuel Dougherty (April 5, 1865 – July 16, 1931) was an American law enforcement officer, private detective and writer. He was considered one of the leading detectives in the United States, first for the Pinkerton Detective Agency and then as a private investigator. Dougherty was responsible for the capture of many notorious criminals during the late 19th and early 20th centuries. He also introduced the modern-day fingerprinting to the police force.

While serving as Second Deputy Police Commissioner and head of the NYPD Detectives Bureau, he is credited with his assistance in solving the 1912 murder of Herman Rosenthal which ultimately resulted in the conviction and execution of the Lenox Avenue Gang and NYPD police detective Lieutenant Charles Becker.

== Biography ==
=== Early life and career with the Pinkertons ===
Born to Charles A. Dougherty and Ellen June in Cressona, Pennsylvania on April 5, 1865, George Dougherty worked as a printer before joining the Pinkerton Detective Agency in 1888. Dougherty soon established himself as one of the agency's top men and apprehended countless criminals during his twenty-three years with the Pinkertons.

Dougherty eventually took charge of the Pinkerton's branch in New York City and held that position until accepting an offer from Mayor William Jay Gaynor to become Deputy Police Commissioner of the New York City Police Department on May 1, 1911.

=== NYPD & the Rosenthal murder ===
His appointment was seen as an attempt to reorganize the NY Police Department. Succeeding William J. Flynn, Dougherty reported directly to Police Commissioner James Church Cropsey who would later become a New York State Supreme Court Justice.

He would have a stormy relationship during his two and a half years with the NYPD however. A strict disciplinarian, he exerted considerable control over his men and was responsible for "shaking up" the bureau on several occasions: he also led raids on a number of illegal gambling establishments, arresting the crime boss Giosue Gallucci, and, in one incident, used axes to force their way in.

When Herman Rosenthal was gunned down in front of the Hotel Metropole on July 16, 1912, then District Attorney Charles S. Whitman accused the police department of making little effort to apprehend the gunmen. One of the few exceptions, according to Whitman, was the assistance given by Dougherty who had been personally cooperating with the District Attorney's office and was praised for his honesty. Prior to leaving the police force, Dougherty led a detective squad which apprehended over a hundred gangsters within a 24-hour period in the aftermath of a gunbattle in which city court clerk Frederick Strauss had been shot and killed.

=== Later years ===
In 1913, Dougherty left the NYPD to become a partner in Dougherty's Detective Bureau and Mercantile Police founded by his brother Harry V. Dougherty around the turn of the 20th century. He began writing books and articles on crime and, in 1914, appeared in two silent films, Our Mutual Girl and The Line-Up at Police Headquarters. In 1921, Dougherty became wealthy when oil was found on land he owned in Arizona. He spent the next several years traveling abroad. He spent some time with Arthur Conan Doyle, the creator of Sherlock Holmes. He also executed a commission to sell an art collection valued at $1 million.

In 1923, he returned to the police force in a somewhat limited capacity when he agreed to become an instructor at Police Commissioner Richard Edward Enright's school for detectives. Much of his time at the school was concentrated on the study of foreign police systems. In his later years, he advocated the deportation of immigrants convicted of a criminal offense, the elimination of the revolver through federal legislation, a bounty payment to killers of hold-up men and the restoration of the whipping post as punishment for first-time offenders.

=== Death ===
Dougherty died of cancer at his 165th Street residence in Flushing, Queens, on the evening of July 16, 1931. His funeral was held at his home two days later and then buried at Cypress Hills Cemetery. Throughout Europe he was recognized as one of the leading American detectives.

== Bibliography ==
=== Books ===
- A Word About Criminals (1916)
- In Europe (1922)
- The Criminal As A Human Being (1924)

=== Articles ===
- "The Public The Criminal's Partner" New Outlook. (August 1913)
- "The Capture of the Missouri Kid" The Detective Magazine. (July 1923)
- "The Criminal as a Human Being" Saturday Evening Post. (March 1924)
- "The Gentle arts of Shadowing and Roping" Saturday Evening Post. (March 1924)
- "The Third Degree" Saturday Evening Post. (May 1924)
- "The Stick-Up and House Prowler" Saturday Evening Post. (June 1924)
- "Combination Lock" Triple-X. (June 1924)
- "The Stage Management of Crime" Saturday Evening Post. (July 1924)
- "Meet the Real City Detective" Saturday Evening Post. (September 1924)
- "The Innocent Guilty" Fawcett's Magazine. (September 1925)
- "Secrets of the Night Club Racketeers" The Master Detective. (June 1931)
- "Recovering the $1,000,000 Art Masterpiece" True Detective Mysteries. (June 1931)
