= Baldy Jack Rose =

American mob informant (1876–1947)

Jacob Rosenzweig
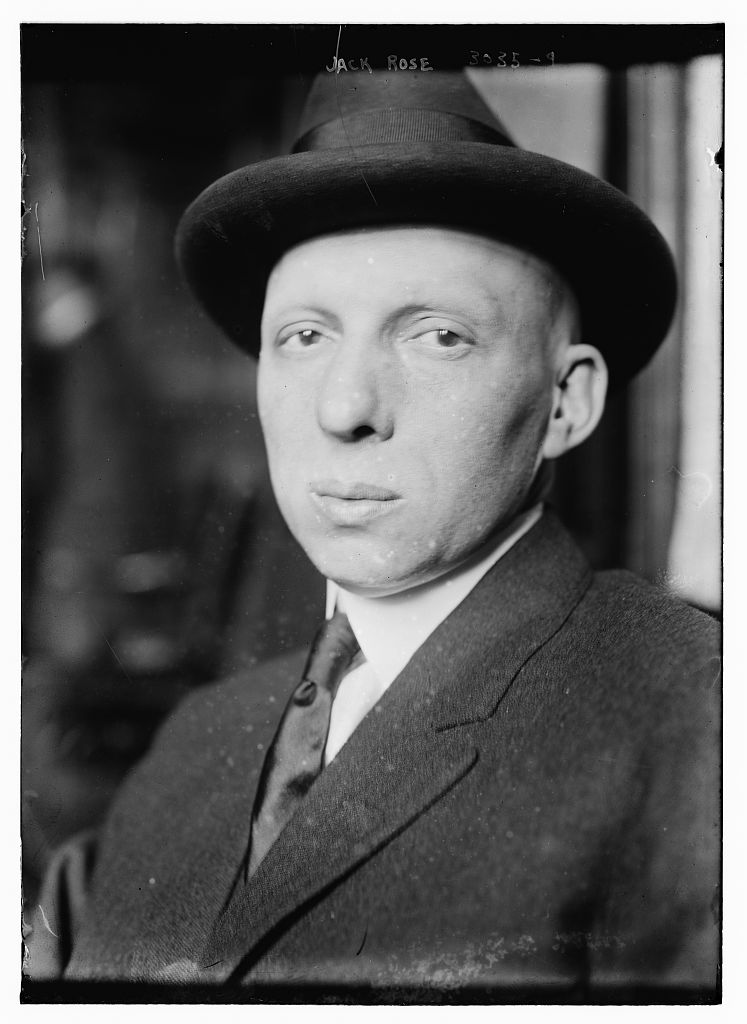
- Rosenzweig circa 1915
- Born: Jacob Rosenzweig; September 1876; Congress Poland
- Died: October 4, 1947 (aged 71); Roosevelt Hospital; Manhattan, New York, United States
- Other names: Bald Jack Rose; Baldy Jack Rose; Billiard Ball Jack
- Occupation: Organized crime
- Known for: Gambler and underworld figure in New York during the turn of the 20th century; star witness in the Rosenthal-Becker murder trial.
- Spouse: Hilda Rose

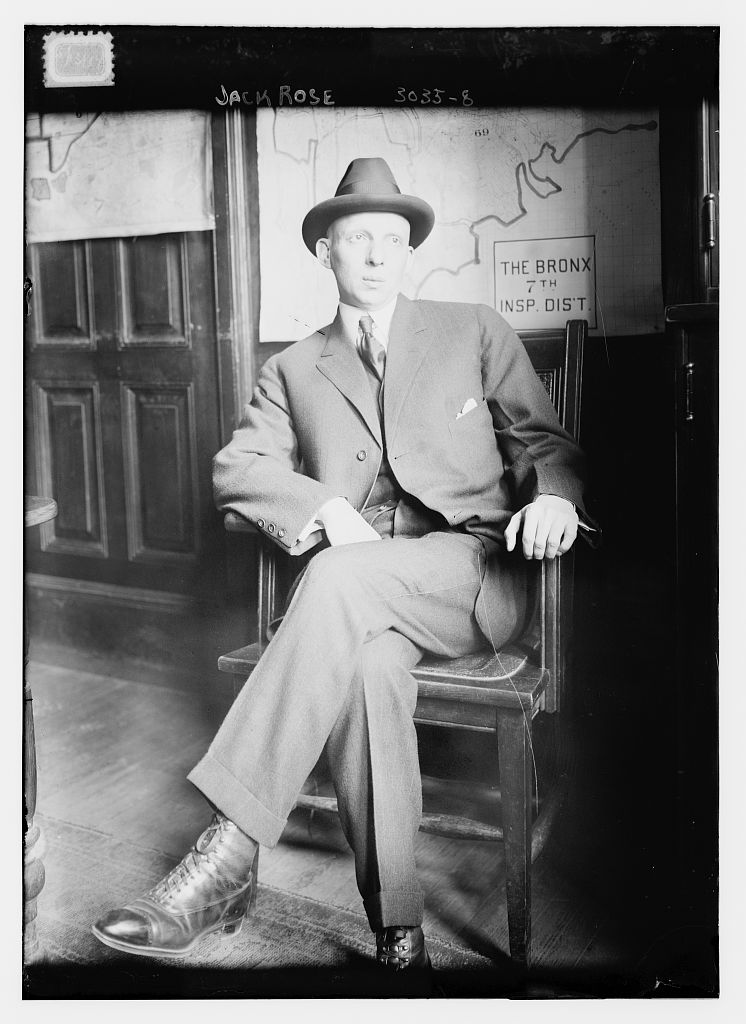
Rose c. 1915

Jacob Rosenzweig (September 1876 – October 4, 1947) was an American gambler and underworld figure in New York City. He was one of several star witnesses in the Becker-Rosenthal trial, among these being fellow gamblers Bridgie Webber, Harry Vallon, and Sam Schepps. Rose's testimony was the most damaging because he directly implicated Becker in arranging the murder of Herman Rosenthal. As Becker's debt collector, Rose confessed to hiring the Lenox Avenue Gang, providing the getaway car. He testified he did it all on the orders of Charles Becker.

== Biography ==
Born in Congress Poland as Jacob Rosenzweig, he grew up in Fairfield County, Connecticut, and spent much of his early life living in Bridgeport, Waterbury, and South Norwalk, Connecticut. He contracted typhoid when he was four years old, causing alopecia universalis, leaving him permanently bald and devoid of eyebrows. His appearance caused him to be "the butt of schoolmates' joke" and where he got his underworld alias.

Rose eventually opened a small-time gambling house in Norwich and was involved in sporting and athletic events including promoting "stumble-bum" pugilists and founded The Rosebuds, an early minor league baseball team in the Connecticut League.

Before World War I he moved to New York City, where he operated a successful Second Avenue gambling resort in East Side Manhattan known as The Rosebud. His place was soon a popular underworld hangout, particularly by the Eastman Gang, and Rose became closely associated with Monk Eastman, "Big" Jack Zelig, and the Lenox Avenue Gang. He was such a popular Broadway character that a cocktail, containing "one jigger of applejack, juice of half a lemon, half an ounce of grenadine, shaken with cracked ice, and strained," was named in his honor.

In the summer of 1912, NYPD detective Lieutenant Charles Becker and the "Gambling Squad" raided The Rosebud. In exchange for not closing down the resort, Rose agreed to pay Becker 25% of his weekly income, which ran as high as $10,000 a month. Rose would also become Becker's official collector for the rest of the gambling establishments from which Becker would extort money. His role in Becker's organization was outlined in an affidavit by Herman Rosenthal, a gambler who had fallen out with Becker, and published in the New York World. On July 16, 1912, after meeting with District Attorney Charles S. Whitman, the four members of the Lenox Avenue Gang gunned down Rosenthal in the doorway of the Hotel Metropole. The murder car was traced by police to a Lower East Side automobile rental service, where one of the owners identified Rose as having rented out the car on the night of the murder. With this information, a number of gamblers and underworld figures including Bridgie Webber, Harry Vallon, Sam Schepps, and Jack Sullivan were rounded up as suspects.

Three days after Rosenthal's murder, Rose turned himself in at the NYPD Headquarters. He later confessed to hiring the gunmen whom he identified as Gyp the Blood, Lefty Louis Rosenberg, Jacob "Whitey Lewis" Seidenschner and Francesco "Dago Frank" Cirofisi, as well as hiring the getaway car and paying the men $1,500 on the orders of Becker. Rose agreed to testify against Becker at his murder trial. One of the star witnesses, his testimony at each of the three trials against Becker resulted in his conviction and eventual execution for murder in 1915. He was also quoted, albeit after the fact, as having predicted the murder of Jack Zelig stating "Zelig will never live to see the trial start. Watch. They'll be the next one they get."

At the end of the trial, Broadway gamblers began laying odds that "the squealer" would be murdered within a matter of days or weeks for becoming an informant. Instead, Rose was offered $1,000 a week to appear in vaudeville and received countless requests to lecture on crime. He eventually sneaked out of the city disguised in a wig and returned to southern Connecticut to become a farmer. A year later, Rose started speaking at churches preaching against gambling and other vices. He also agreed to appear in several motion picture shorts for that purpose and, in 1917, he lectured at US Army training camps to warn troops about gambling.

In 1936, he was threatened with rearrest in the Rosenthal case.

He fell ill in his later years and returned to New York to live in a residential hotel with his wife, Hilda. In late September 1947, Rose was sent to Roosevelt Hospital, where he remained for several weeks until he died from an "internal disorder" on October 4, 1947. In relative obscurity at the time of his death, his funeral at Riverside Chapel, on Amsterdam Avenue and Seventy-Sixth Street, attracted no public attention except for Chief of Detectives George Mitchell, who declared his police file to be officially closed.
