= Harry Horowitz =

American gangster

Harry "Gyp the Blood" Horowitz
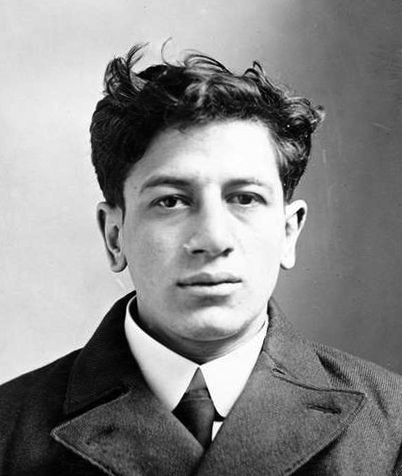
- Police mugshot of Horowitz in 1912
- Born: c. 1889; New York City, U.S.
- Died: April 13, 1914 (aged 24/25); Sing Sing Prison, New York, U.S.
- Resting place: Mount Zion Cemetery, Queens
- Other names: Gyp the Blood; Levy; Jones
- Spouse: Lillian Horowitz
- Status: Executed by electrocution
- Convictions: First degree murder Robbery; Burglary
- Penalty: Death

Harry Horowitz (c. 1889 – April 13, 1914), also known as "Gyp the Blood", was an American underworld figure and a leader of the Lenox Avenue Gang in New York City.

== Early life and career ==
Harry Horowitz was born on the Lower East Side of Manhattan c. 1889 to Orthodox Jewish parents. He was a slight figure, standing just under 5 feet 5 inches (1.65 m) and weighing 140 pounds (64 kg). but extraordinarily strong. He bragged that to win a $2 bet, he had broken a man's back in three places. He served prison terms for burglary and robbery.

New York City Judge Franklin C. Hoyt later recalled:

Three or four years ago, when I was sitting in special sessions, my associates and I had occasion to sentence a young man who had been found guilty of petty larceny. In pronouncing sentence I said: 'I am convinced from the evidence that has been brought out here that you are lacking in moral sense, that at the end of your prison term you will go out and commit more. It is a wrong to the community that you should be so set at liberty, and it is a wrong to you that you should be allowed to follow your course without restraint.' One of the parents of my young man—he was barely twenty-one—told me tearfully that he was a good boy, the best of boys, but that he had been in bad company and tempted too far. Before he had served out his term his parent came to me again to tell me that now he had promised to reform and how well he was doing. I still had my doubts.

— The Outlook, February 8, 1913.

== Rosenthal murder ==
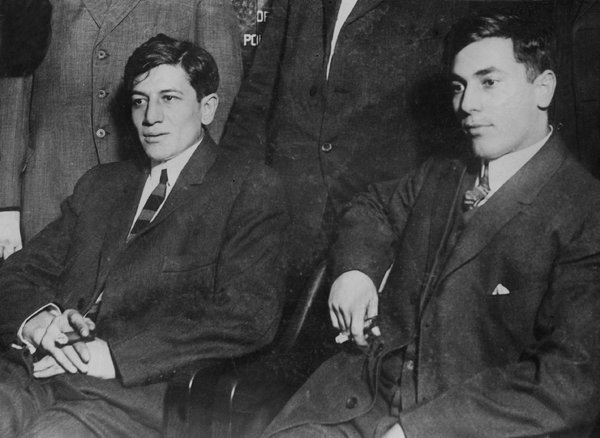
Horowitz (left) and "Lefty Louis" Rosenberg after their capture in 1912

On July 16, 1912, he and three accomplices murdered bookmaker Herman Rosenthal outside the Hotel Metropole. The four shot Rosenthal to death. Two of the killers, Jacob Seidenshner (aka "Whitey Lewis"), and Francisco "Frank" Cirofici (aka "Dago Frank") were arrested immediately after the killing, along with Charles Becker, a detective from the New York Police Department who was suspected of being a business partner of Rosenthal, but Horowitz and the fourth gunman, "Lefty" Louis Rosenberg, were not. There was a massive hunt for the missing two, who were found and arrested on September 14, 1912, in an apartment in Glendale, Queens, where they had been hiding for months.

During the trial, the three defendants claimed Rosenthal was murdered by someone known only as Itsky. Defense attorney Charles G.F. Wahle said Horowitz was no saint but was not guilty, telling the jury: "He has never been known as Gyp the Blood, but only as Gyp. He is the victim of evil companions. He is a cheat and a sharper and has been convicted as such. It would be futile for us to deny this, but he is not a murderer."

Horowitz, Rosenberg, Seidenshner and Cirofici were convicted in November 1912 and sentenced to death. There were rumors that an attempt to rescue the criminals would be made during their transfer to Sing Sing Prison after the trial. Sheriff Julius Harburger, responsible for transporting the prisoners, received a number of anonymous notes, and one stated:

Sheriff Harburger—watch out when you take Gyp and his gang up the long steps at Ossining. Kitty the Second and his bunch will be there hiding in the rocks to shoot you up and rescue them. A WELL-WISHER.

Their case before the New York Court of Appeals was denied in February 1914, but Becker was granted a new trial. They produced additional witnesses on April 11, 1914, who swore to their innocence, but New York Supreme Court Justice Goff did not find them credible.

Horowitz gave a last statement to the press on April 13, 1914, stating:

We all knew that the result was decided against us just as soon as we heard Justice Goff was in the case. We had given up expecting mercy either from Justice Goff or District Attorney Whitman.

Two hours before the execution, Cirofici gave a statement admitting he lied on the stand during the trial. Cirofici made the statement in the presence of the warden, the superintendent of the State Prison Department, and his mother and sister, regarding Rosenthal's murder. He stated that he was not present during the murder, but that it was committed by Rosenberg, Horowitz and informant Harry Vallon, who testified for the state during the trial.

On April 13, 1914, Horowitz was put to death in the electric chair, along with Rosenberg, Seidenshner and Cirofici. The next year, Becker also was executed for his part in the murder.

== In popular culture ==
Set No. 2 for chamber orchestra (K. 1C32, 1912) by American composer Charles Ives included a piece titled "'Gyp the Blood' or Hearst!? Which Is worst?!," inviting a comparison between the gangster and publishing magnate William Randolph Hearst. Blues singer Rabbit Brown wrote a song called "Gyp The Blood", which appears to be based on him. A character nicknamed Gyp the Blood appears in a book by Kevin Baker, where a fictionalized version of events from Harry Horowitz's life play out. He was mentioned in a 1926 W.C. Fields movie It's the Old Army Game. In the same year, he appears in the preface of the novel Psmith, Journalist by P.G. Wodehouse. He also is mentioned in the Tom Waits song "Down There by the Train".

In Booth Tarkington's 1914 novel "Penrod," he is mentioned in Chapter 22, in a mocking reference to young Penrod's attempt to project a swaggering tough-guy image.
