= Frank Cirofici =

American gangster and murderer

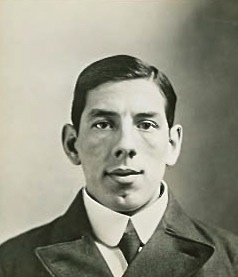
- Frank Cirofici, in a 1914 mugshot
- Born: Francesco Cirofici; 1885 or 1886; Italy
- Died: April 13, 1914 (aged 27-29); Sing Sing Prison, New York, United States
- Status: Executed by electrocution
- Conviction: First degree murder
- Penalty: Death

Details
- Victims: Herman Rosenthal
- Date: July 16, 1912

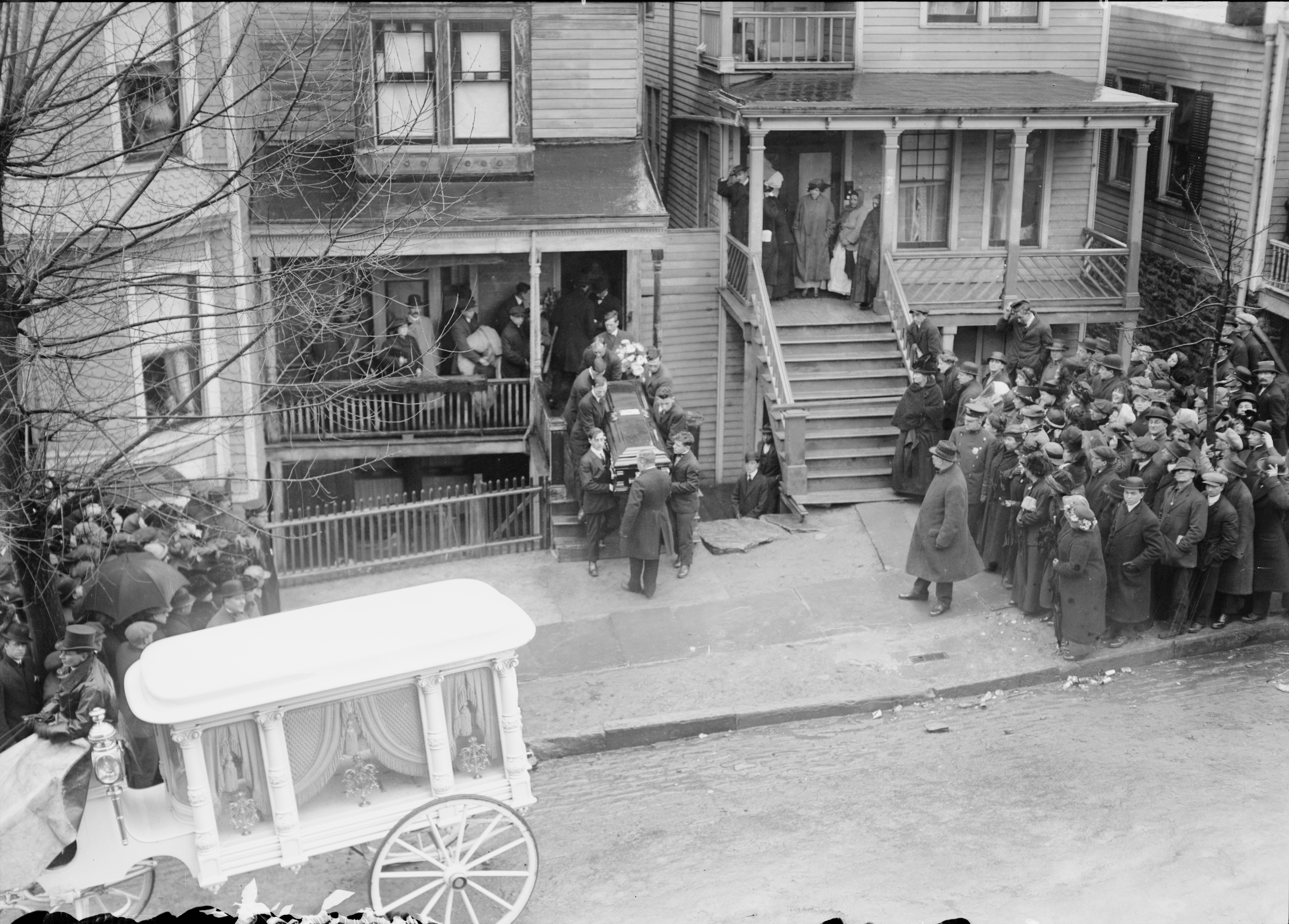
Frank Cirofici's funeral

Francesco Cirofici (also known as Frank Murato or Dago Frank, 1887 – April 13, 1914) was an Italian-American criminal and gangster, who, along with Harry Horowitz, was responsible for the July 16, 1912, murder of gambler Herman Rosenthal outside the Hotel Metropole.

== Early life ==
Francesco Cirofici was born in 1887 in Italy. He worked as a steam fitter as well as being a member of the Lenox Avenue Gang. Before his arrest in connection with the Rosenthal killing, he had been arrested only once. In 1905, he was imprisoned on a burglary charge in the Elmira Correctional Facility. In 1907, Cirofici's name appeared on a list released by the NYPD of gamblers known to make a practice of cheating steamship passengers.

== Arrest and trial ==
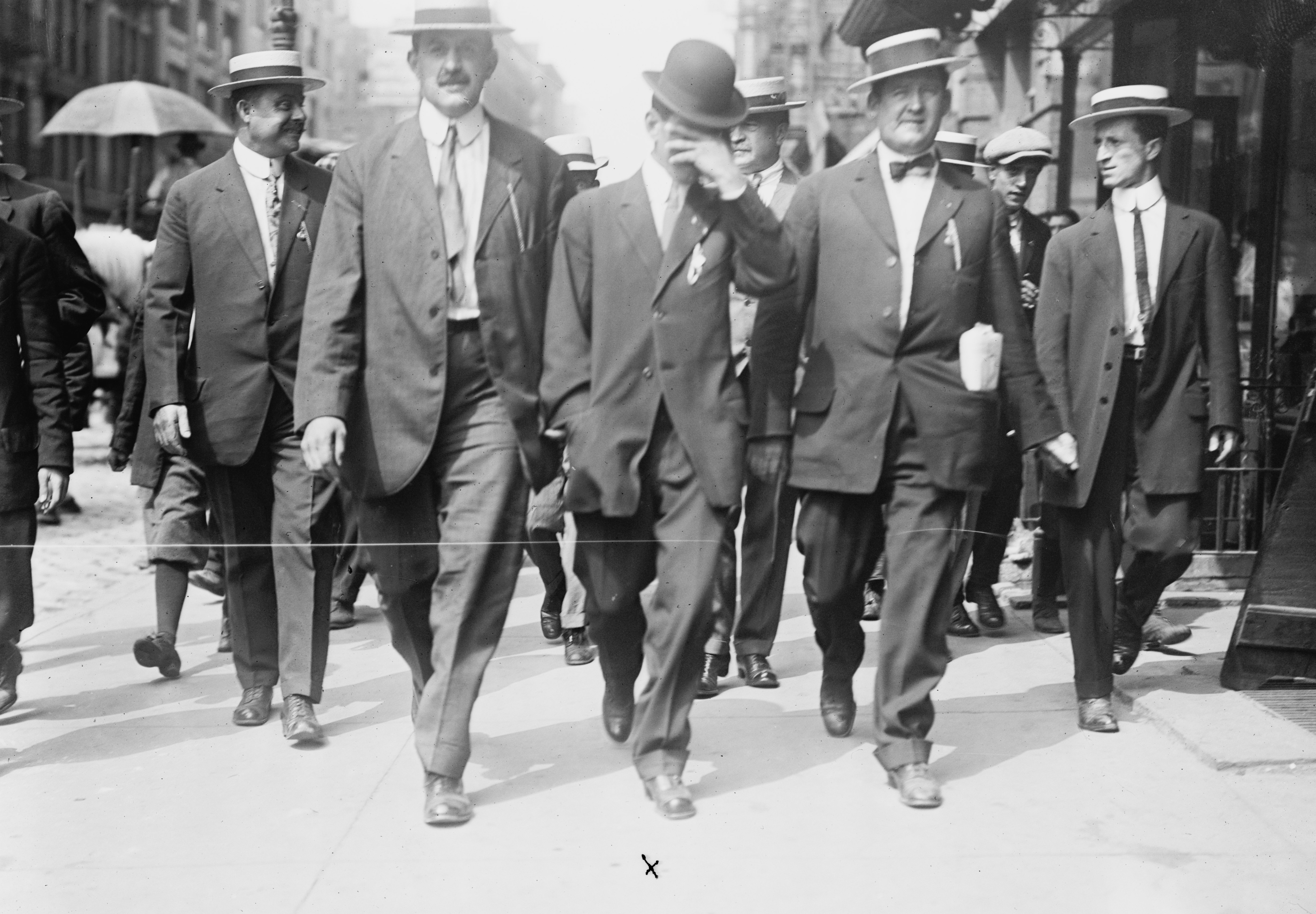
Cirofici dodging a camera

Cirofici was arrested in connection with the Rosenthal murder on July 25, 1912. It was rumored that Cirofici had been betrayed to the police by the owner of the Dante Café, James Verrella. Verrella was murdered on July 30, 1912, in retaliation for his supposed betrayal. Cirofici was convicted of the Rosenthal killing after 25 minutes of jury deliberation on November 19, 1912. He was sentenced to death on November 26, 1912, for the Rosenthal killing along with Charles Becker, Harry Horowitz, and "Lefty Louis Rosenberg" by Judge John W. Goff.

The four gunmen appealed their conviction, but Cirofici's guilty verdict, along with the verdicts of Horowitz and Rosenberg, were affirmed on February 25, 1914, with Becker winning a new trial. In March 1914, Cirofici's sister, Mary Cirofici, collected signatures for an appeal for clemency to New York State Governor Martin H. Glynn. Glynn denied the appeal on April 7, 1914. On April 10, 1914, Cirofici's lawyers submitted five affidavits from five alibi witnesses.

Two days later, on April 12, 1914, Cirofici's mother and sister attempted to see Glynn to beg for clemency. Glynn refused to allow them into his office and stated it would not be fair as he had not seen the mothers of any of the other men convicted. Cirofici reportedly confessed his guilt in the killing 2 hours before he was executed in the electric chair in Sing Sing Prison on April 13, 1914, despite warden James M. Clancy's attempt to grant him a temporary reprieve to allow Glynn to evaluate Cirofici's confession.
