= Sam Schepps =

American mobster (1873–1936)

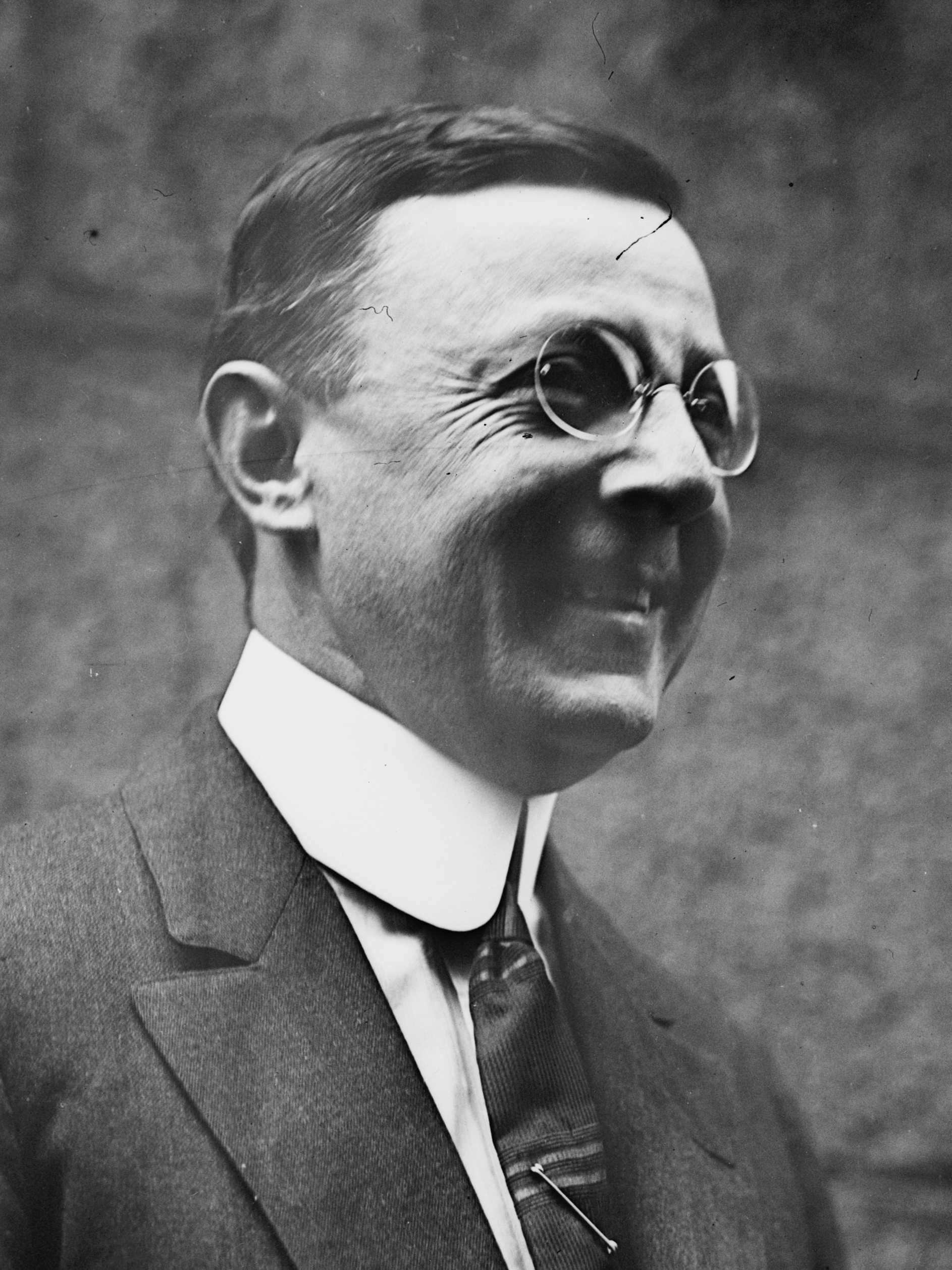
Sam Schepps in 1912

Samuel Schepps (19 April 1873 – 12 January 1936), also known as Schapps, was a New York City mobster with the Monk Eastman Gang. Schepps ran gambling houses for Jack Zelig as part of his work with the gang.

== Biography ==
On July 16, 1912, Herman Rosenthal was murdered in front of the Hotel Metropole in New York City. Schepps was identified by coconspirators as the "paymaster" of the plot to kill Rosenthal. Within the week, Schepps had disappeared and was believed to have left New York. He was tracked down and, on August 10, 1912, was arrested in Hot Springs, Arkansas. Sick and broke when he was caught, Schepps was reportedly happy to return to New York to testify against his accomplices. The fact that Schepps was hiding in Hot Springs was revealed to police by Harry Vallon, an accomplice in Rosenthal's murder. Vallon, along with Schepps and other mob informants Bridgey Webber and Jack Rose, testified at the Becker-Rosenthal trial. His testimony resulted in the conviction of Charles Becker and the four gunmen involved in the murder.

Schepps and his brother Nathan later ran an antique and jewelry store, the Maison Cluny, at 437 Madison Avenue. In October, 1921, the famed soprano Lydia Lipkowska charged Schepps with usury over his refusal to return two diamonds worth $80,000 that she had pawned to him. Lipkowska said that she had borrowed $12,000 and had left the diamonds with Schepps as security and that he sought $5000 in interest before he would return the jewels.

On October 3, 1933, he and Nathan were arrested and charged with forgery in connection with falsified checks worth over $10,000, which they had deposited in their business's bank account.

Sam Schepps died on January 12, 1936, in the Fifth Avenue Hospital. His tombstone references his birth year as 1875, but his New York City death certificate and other historical records put his year of birth at 1873.
