= Jack Rose (cocktail) =

Cocktail of applejack, grenadine and citrus juice popular in the 1920s and 1930s

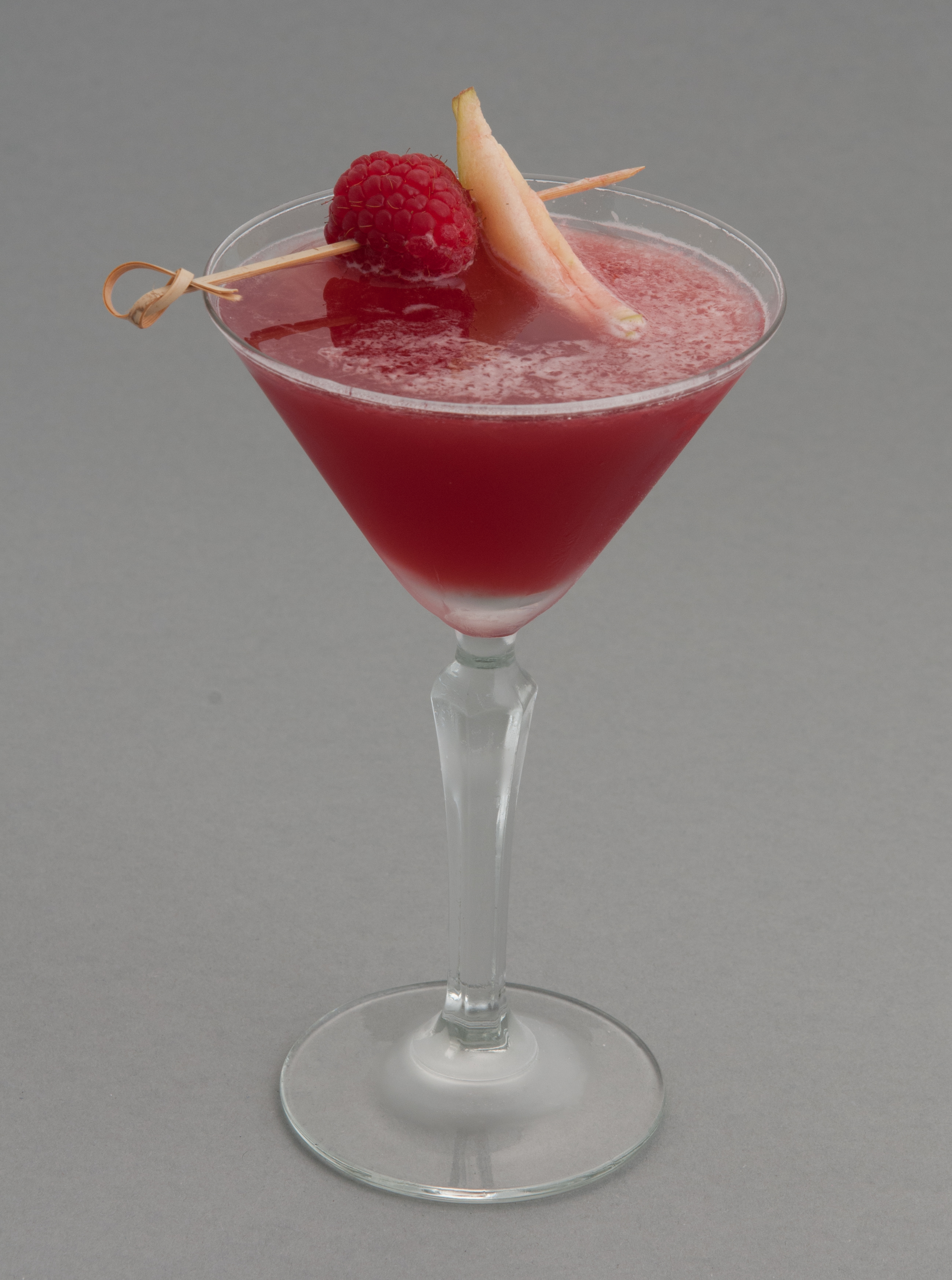
- Type: Cocktail
- Ingredients: 4 parts applejack; 1 part lemon or lime juice; 1/2 part grenadine
- Base spirit: Brandy
- Standard drinkware: Cocktail glass
- Standard garnish: lemon zest
- Served: Straight up: chilled, without ice
- Preparation: Traditionally shaken into a chilled glass, garnished, and served straight up.

A Jack Rose is a cocktail containing applejack, grenadine, and lemon or lime juice. It was popular in the 1920s and 1930s, notably appearing in Ernest Hemingway's 1926 classic, The Sun Also Rises, in which Jake Barnes, the narrator, drinks a Jack Rose in the bar of the Hôtel de Crillon while awaiting the arrival of Lady Brett Ashley. It was also a favorite drink of author John Steinbeck.

The Jack Rose is one of six basic drinks listed in David A. Embury's The Fine Art of Mixing Drinks.

== History ==
References to the Jack Rose date back to the early 20th century. A 1905 article in the National Police Gazette mentions the drink and credits a New Jersey bartender named Frank J. May as its creator. A 1913 news article mentions that sales of the drink had suffered due to the involvement of Baldy Jack Rose in the Rosenthal murder case.

There are various theories as to the origin of the drink's name. One has the drink being named after (or even invented by) the infamous gambler Bald Jack Rose. However, this is disproven by the fact that the drink predates Bald Jack Rose's career. Albert Stevens Crockett states that it is named after the pink "Jacquemot" (also known as Jacqueminot or Jacque) rose. It has been suggested that the Jack Rose was invented by Joseph P. Rose, a Newark, New Jersey restaurateur who once held the title of "World's Champion Mixologist." Harvey's Famous Restaurant in Washington, D.C. also claimed to be the originator of the cocktail. The most likely explanation of the name is that it is a simple portmanteau — it is made with applejack and is rose colored from the grenadine.

The cocktail has fallen out of fashion. In June 2003, the Washington Post published an article that chronicled two writers' quest to find a Jack Rose in a Washington, D.C. bar. After visiting numerous bars, they were unsuccessful in finding one where the bartender knew the drink and the bar stocked applejack. Ultimately they bought a bottle of applejack for one of the few bartenders they encountered who knew how to make one.

With the craft cocktail movement on the rise, the Jack Rose has regained some popularity. Laird & Company, producers of the most widely available brands of applejack in the United States, said in 2015 that sales were up in part due to renewed interest in the cocktail.

== See also ==
- List of cocktails
