= Dreamland (Baker novel) =

1999 novel by Kevin Baker

- First edition cover
- Author: Kevin Baker
- Publisher: HarperCollins
- Publication date: March 2, 1999
- ISBN: 0-06-019309-3

Dreamland is a 1999 novel by American author Kevin Baker, published by HarperCollins Publishers. It centers on the colorful underworld of turn-of-the-century New York City, with much of the action taking place at Dreamland amusement park in Coney Island.

Many of the characters and events in Dreamland are based on real, historical accounts and people. For example, Kid Twist, Gyp the Blood, General Tom Thumb, his wife Lavinia Warren, and Timothy Sullivan are all central characters in the book, and a major story arc follows a popular criminal trial of the period. Dreamland is the first volume in publication order of Baker's City of Fire trilogy of historical novels on New York City, the others being Paradise Alley (2002) and Striver's Row (2006).
