= Sometimes You See It Coming =

1993 novel by Kevin Baker

- Author: Kevin Baker
- Language: English
- Genre: Fiction
- Publisher: Crown Publishing
- Publication date: February 17, 1993
- Publication place: United States
- Media type: Print
- Pages: 326
- ISBN: 0-517-59088-3
- OCLC: 142536982
- Dewey Decimal: 813.54
- LC Class: PS3552.A43143

Sometimes You See It Coming is a 1993 novel by Kevin Baker. The novel follows several fictitious members of the modern-day New York Mets, particularly right fielder John Barr. The book portrays the Mets as a perennial pennant contender, and follows the team through one particular season, with flashbacks.

== Characters ==
Mets

- C Spock Feeley
- 1B No-Hit Hitt
- 2B Roberto Rodriguez (aka Bobby Roddy)
- SS Lonnie Lee
- 3B Terry White/Stillwater Norman
- LF Maximillian Duke (aka The Emp'ror)
- CF Rapid Ricky Falls (aka The Old Swizzlehead)
- RF John Barr

Pitchers

- Moses Yellowhorse

Coaches

- MGR Charlie Stanzi (aka The Little Maniac)
- Coach Plate

Press Corps

- Barry Busby
- Ellie Jay

Others

- Evan Barr (John's father)
- Wanda Falls (Ricky's wife)

== Reception ==
Publishers Weekly noted that while the book had a predictable ending and "uneven", awkward writing, Baker had "an undeniable feel" for the interactions between the baseball players, and was capable of "flashes of quick wit". Kirkus Reviews stated that while the book was "baseball as it's meant to be", Barr's backstory was "somber, overripe [...] Freudian glop" that did not fit the theme.
