= Lydia Lipkowska =

Russian opera singer (1882–1958)

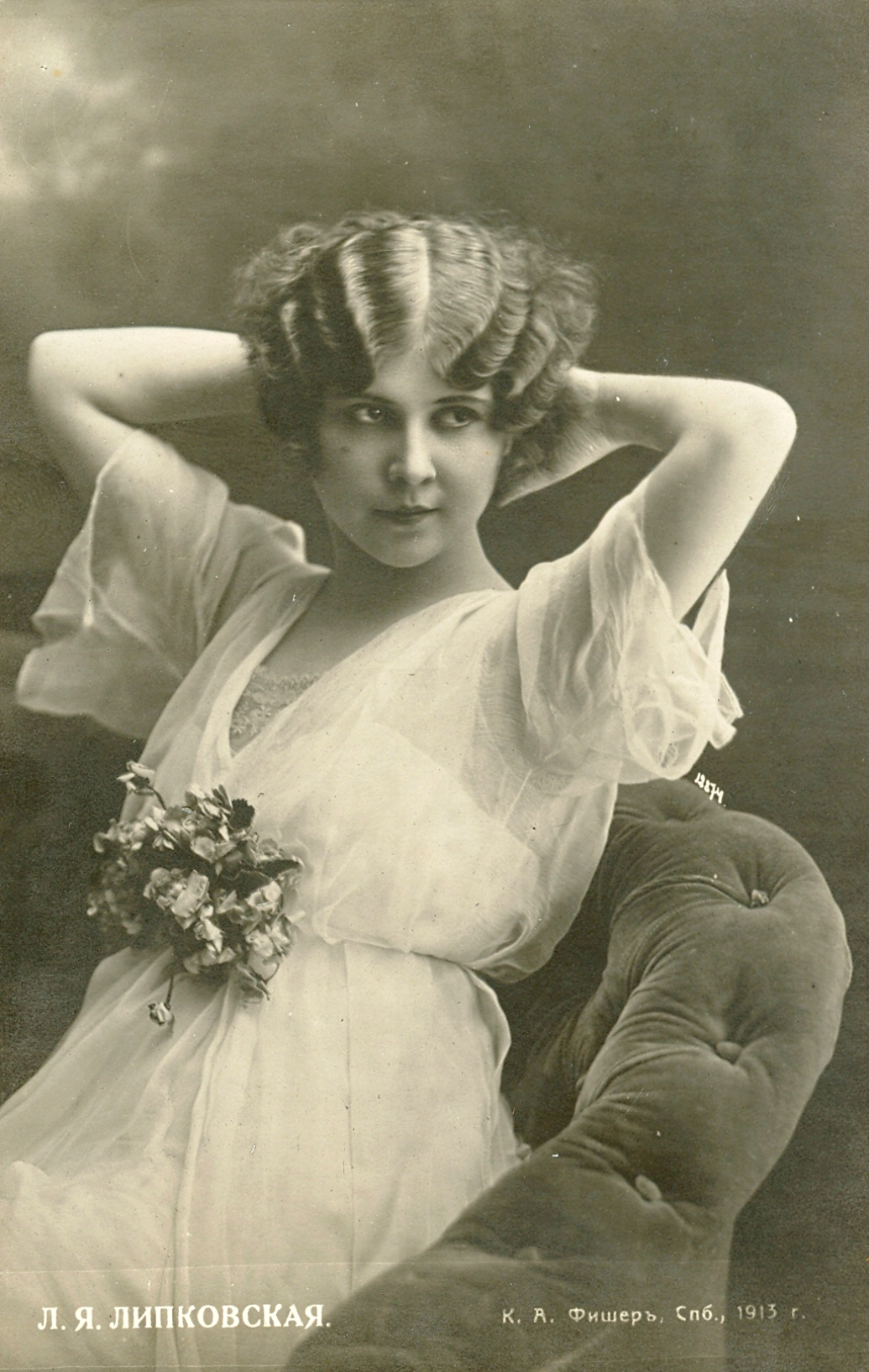
- Lipkowska in 1913
- Born: Lydia Marschner; 10 May 1882; Babino, Bessarabia Governorate, Russian Empire
- Died: 22 March 1958 (aged 75); Beirut, Lebanon
- Education: Saint Petersburg Conservatory
- Occupation: Opera lyric coloratura soprano

Lydia Yakovlevna Lipkowska or Lipkovskaya (Note: Russian: Лидия Яковлевна Липковская, romanized: Lidiya Yakovlevna Lipkovskaya; Ukrainian: Лідія Яківна Липковська.) (née Marschner; 10 May 1882 – 22 March 1958) was a Russian operatic soprano who had an active international career during the first half of the 20th century. A gifted lyric coloratura soprano, she performed leading roles at the Mariinsky Theatre, the Metropolitan Opera, the Royal Opera House, La Scala, and the Opéra-Comique among other theaters.

== Biography ==
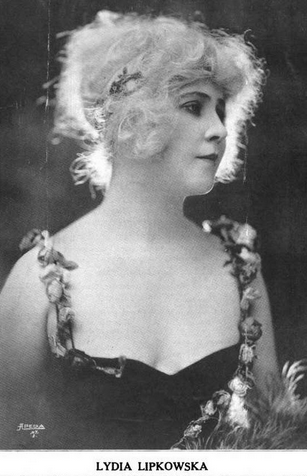
Lydia Lipkowska, from Music News, 1921

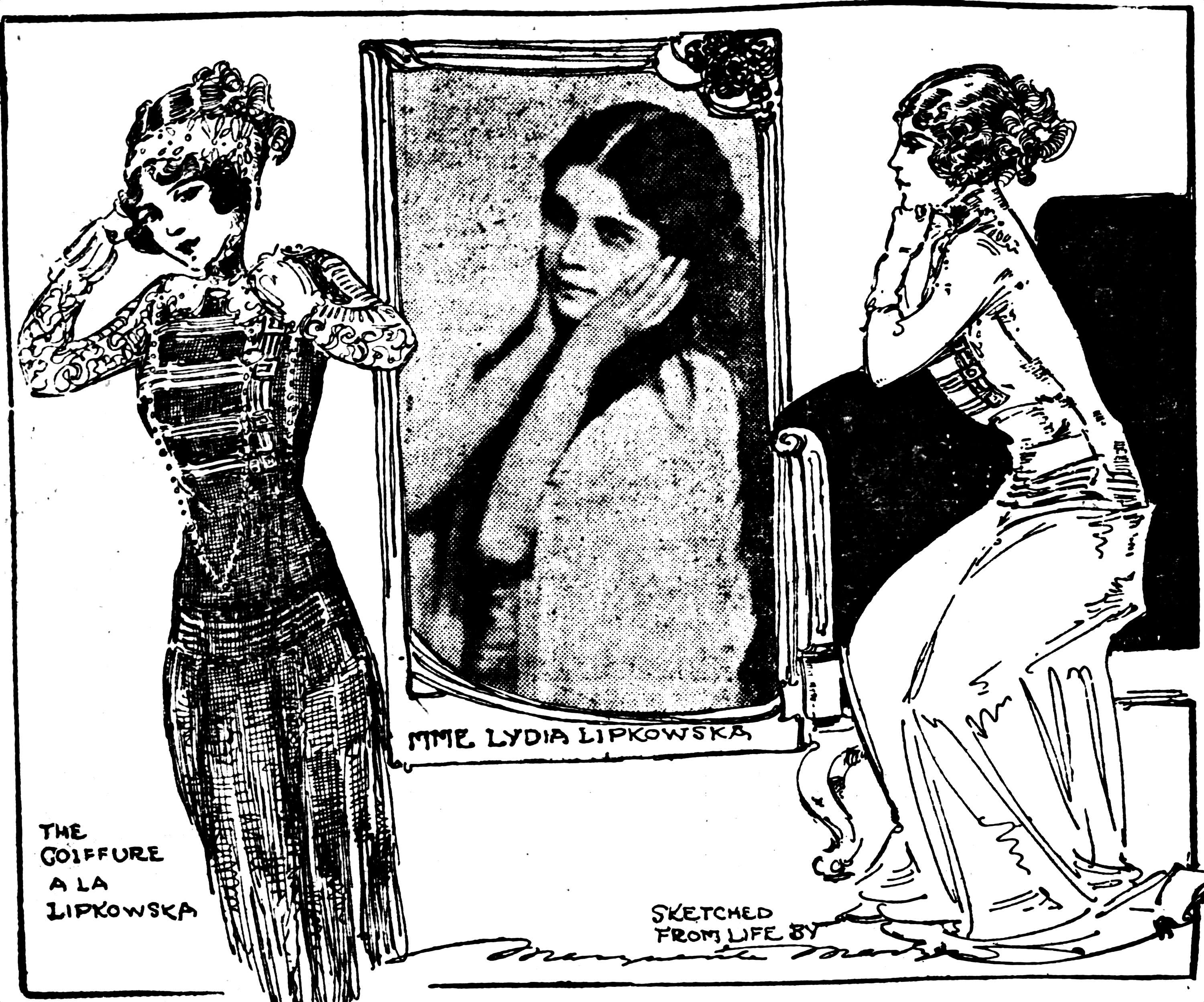
Lipkowska in drawings by Marguerite Martyn, with a photo, 1910

She was born on 10 May 1882 to the family of a rural teacher in Babino, in Bessarabia Governorate of the Russian Empire (now in Ukraine). Her birth name was Lydia Marschner.

After Kamianets-Podiskyi, Lipkowska was trained at the Saint Petersburg Conservatory. She studied with Natalia Iretskaya, a pupil of celebrated voice teacher Pauline Viardot. She was committed to the Mariinsky Theatre from 1906 to 1908 and again from 1911 to 1913. Her repertoire at that opera house included Gilda in Rigoletto, Juliette in Roméo et Juliette, Marfa in The Tsar's Bride, Micaëla in Carmen, Olga in Ivan IV, Tatyana in Eugene Onegin, and the title roles in Iolanta, Lakmé, Lucia di Lammermoor, and The Snow Maiden. In 1909, she performed in operas in Paris prior to traveling to the United States later that year. She made her Paris debut at Théâtre du Châtelet, which was followed by engagement at the Opéra-Comique as Lakmé and the Paris Opera as Gounod's Juliette.

Lipkowska was a member of the Metropolitan Opera (the "Met") in New York City from 1909 until 1911. She made her debut at the Met as Violetta in La Traviata on November 18, 1909, with Caruso as Alfredo. She concurrently was a member of the Boston Opera Company for the 1909/1910 and 1910/1911 seasons; making her debut in Boston in November 1909. Her Boston roles included Gilda, Lakmé, Rosina in The Barber of Seville, Violetta, and the title roles in Manon and Lucia di Lammermoor. She also performed with the Chicago Grand Opera Company in 1910. While in Boston, Lipkowska was honored by The Lenox Hotel, which put on its menu the "cup Lydia" and the "Soufflé à la Lipkowska". She petitioned a judge for an injunction against the hotel, claiming that the menu items were "injuring her reputation and holding her up to ridicule".

In 1910, Lipkowska returned to the Opéra-Comique as Verdi's Violetta. In 1911, she made her debut at the Royal Opera House in London as Mimì in Giacomo Puccini's La bohème, and her debut at the Vienna Volksoper in the title role of Bizet's Carmen. She later returned to the Royal Opera House as Violetta, Gilda, and in the title role of Ermanno Wolf-Ferrari's Il segreto di Susanna for the United Kingdom premiere of that work in July 1911.

In 1912, Lipkowska charged New York gangster Sam Schepps with usury over his refusal to return two diamonds worth $80,000 that she had pawned to him. Lipkowska said that she had borrowed $12,000 from Schepps, had left the diamonds with him as security, and that he sought $5000 in interest before he would return the jewels. That same year she returned to Henry Russell's Boston Opera Company for the 1912/1913 season.

Lipowska married Russian baritone Georges Baklanoff a few years prior to the outbreak of World War I; but the marriage ended in divorce. The couple appeared in numerous operas together in the years leading up to that war at the Opéra de Monte-Carlo; also collaborating frequently with tenor Giovanni Martinelli. In 1914, she sang in the world premiere of Amilcare Ponchielli's I Mori di Valenza at the Opéra de Monte-Carlo. In 1914/1915, Lipkowska was a resident artist at La Scala in Milan. In that city, she continued her vocal training with Vittorio Vanza.

Lipkowska was once again committed to the Mariinsky Theatre when the Russian Revolution began in 1917. Lipkowska fled the capital with her daughter, Aidenna, when the Bolsheviks seized power during the October Revolution of that year. The family lived in a remote area of the Caucasus region of southern Russia, until once again fleeing the Bolshevik armies for the city of Odessa. There she befriended a French military officer, Pierre Bodin, who helped Lipkowska and her daughter to once again escape the invading Bolshevik armies in April 1919, by securing the family passage on a ship to Constantinople. Lipkowska married Pierre Bodin, and upon her marriage she emigrated to France in 1919.

In 1920, Lipkowska traveled to New York on the RMS Adriatic of the White Star Line on February 8. In September 1920, she sang Gilda in Rigoletto with the San Carlo Opera Company in Manhattan. She spent the 1920s performing at a variety of theatres in the United States and Europe, and ended her performance career touring the Soviet Union in 1928–1929. In 1921, she appeared on Broadway at the Knickerbocker Theatre in the title role of Franz Lehár's The Merry Widow. That same year she performed a concert of Russian and French opera arias at Carnegie Hall.

After retiring from the stage, Lipkowska lived in Romania where she was active as a voice teacher. One of her students was the soprano Virginia Zeani. She came out of retirement for one last performance at the Odessa Opera in 1941, to perform the role of Violetta one last time. In 1945 she relocated to Paris, and later moved to Milan before finally settling in Lebanon where she lived her final years. She died in Beirut at the age of 75.

== Sources ==
- Barnes, Harold; Blyth, Alan (1 January 2009). "Lipkowska, Lydia". The Grove Book of Opera Singers. Oxford University Press. ISBN 978-0-19-533765-5.
