= Howard P. Becker =

American sociologist (1899–1960)

- Born: Howard Paul Becker; December 9, 1899; New York City, US
- Died: June 8, 1960 (aged 60); Madison, Wisconsin, US
- Parents: Charles Becker; Letitia Stenson

Academic background
- Education: Northwestern University; University of Chicago
- Thesis: Ionia and Athens Studies in Secularization (1930)
- Doctoral advisor: Robert E. Park

Academic work
- Discipline: Sociology
- Institutions: University of Wisconsin–Madison
- Doctoral students: C. Wright Mills
- Notable works: Man in Reciprocity (1956)

Howard Paul Becker (December 9, 1899 – June 8, 1960) was an American sociologist who was professor of sociology at the University of Wisconsin–Madison.

== Biography ==
Becker was born in New York in 1899, the son of Charles Becker, a New York police officer, and Letitia (née Stenson), of Ontario. His parents divorced six years after his birth. His mother married again, to Becker's brother Paul. His father Charles Becker later married twice more. He was prosecuted in New York for the 1912 murder of a gambler, found guilty, and executed in 1915.

Howard P. Becker was brought up by his mother and stepfather in Reno and Winnemucca, Nevada, where he attended local schools. He earned his undergraduate degree at Northwestern University, and completed a master's and doctorate in sociology at the University of Chicago.

Becker became a full professor of sociology at University of Wisconsin-Madison. Among his interests was exploring what he called "constructed types" of sacred and secular societies.

He is perhaps best remembered as the author of the book Man in Reciprocity: Introductory Lectures on Culture, Society and Personality (1956). This was an edited series of radio lectures on introductory sociology, a novel approach at the time. He was praised for a style described as "urbane, witty, and literate", and also for an interdisciplinary approach that drew on concepts in sociology, social psychology, and anthropology. His book was also described as presenting a "coherent view of sociology" in a "vigorous and idiosyncratic manner".

Among graduate students whom Becker advised was C. Wright Mills, when Mills was completing his doctoral thesis at Wisconsin-Madison. Mills later said that he was not happy with Becker's role in the thesis defense. He outright refused to rework his dissertation in lines with criticism from his committee.

At the time of his death, Becker had just been elected President of the American Sociological Association. His presidential address, entitled "Normative Reactions to Normlessness", was delivered by his son, the historian Christopher Bennett Becker.

Becker died on June 8, 1960, of a cerebral thrombosis.

== Bibliography ==
- Barnes, Harry Elmer; Becker, Howard Paul (1938), Social Thought From Lore to Science, New York: Heath, OCLC 502796286
- Becker, Howard Paul (1946). German Youth: Bond or Free. New York: Oxford University Press, 1946. Detailed history and sociology of the various aspects of the youth movement. Remarkable for the times, the discussion of homoeroticism and homosexuality within some of these groups is non-judgmental. OCLC 2083809 In 1998, Routledge reprinted this work as Volume 8 of its International Library of Sociology and The Sociology of Youth and Adolescence series. OCLC 761549797 ISBN 978-0-415-86351-3
- Becker, Howard Paul (1950), Through Values to Social Interpretation, Durham, N. C.: Duke University Press, OCLC 562723
- Becker, Howard Paul (1956), Man in Reciprocity: Introductory lectures on culture, society and personality, New York: F. A. Praeger, OCLC 973583
