= Charles Becker =

American police officer and convicted murderer (1870–1915)

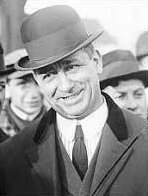
- Born: July 26, 1870; Callicoon Center, New York U.S.
- Died: July 30, 1915 (aged 45); Sing Sing Prison, New York, U.S.
- Criminal status: Executed by electrocution
- Relatives: Howard P. Becker
- Police career
- Department: New York City Police Department
- Service years: 1893–1912
- Rank: Lieutenant

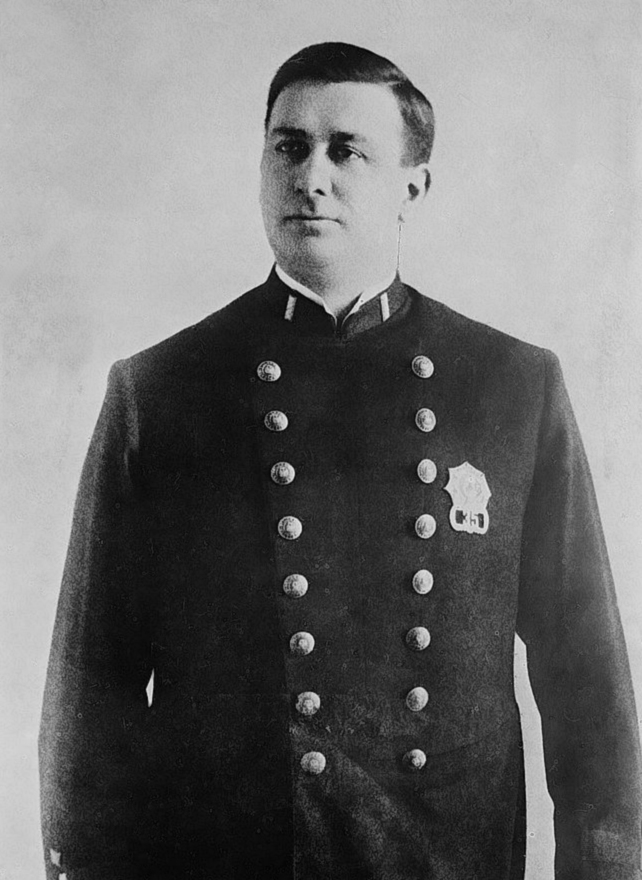
Becker in uniform circa 1912

Charles Becker (July 26, 1870 – July 30, 1915) was a lieutenant in the New York City Police Department between the 1890s and the 1910s. He was convicted of first degree murder and executed for the killing of Herman Rosenthal, a bookmaker and gambler, in 1912 near Times Square.

Becker appealed and was retried but was convicted again. The corruption scandal related to the case was one of the most important in New York City’s early 20th century Progressive Era.

== Early life ==
Charles Becker was born in 1870 in the village of Callicoon Center, in Sullivan County, New York. His parents were German-American immigrants from Bavaria. Becker moved to New York City as a young man in 1890 and went to work as a bouncer in a German beer hall just off the Bowery.

In November 1893, he joined the New York City Police Department. In the fall of 1896, Becker gained wide attention when he arrested Ruby Young (alias Dora Clark) on Broadway because the known prostitute was in the company of popular writer Stephen Crane, the author of The Red Badge of Courage.

The next day at Ruby Young's hearing, Crane stepped forward and defended Young. Crane's popularity carried weight in court at the sentencing of Young, and Magistrate Robert C. Cornell dismissed the case. Afterward Crane told reporters, "If the girl will have the officer prosecuted for perjury, I will gladly support her." Three weeks later, Young filed formal charges against Becker.

Feeling vulnerable, Becker gathered evidence, hired experienced defense counsel Louis Grant, and rallied the support of his colleagues. Becker made a powerful entrance to his trial on October 15, 1896, surrounded by a phalanx of policemen. Commissioner Frederick Dent Grant, son of Ulysses S. Grant, headed the proceeding. After almost five hours of examination, Becker was acquitted.

== Marriage and family ==
Becker married Letitia Stenson from Ontario, Canada. Their son, Howard P. Becker, was born in 1899. Six years later the couple divorced, and Howard grew up with his mother and stepfather in the West. His mother married Charles's brother Paul. Howard Becker completed a doctorate in sociology at the University of Chicago and later became a full professor at University of Wisconsin-Madison.

Charles Becker married and divorced again. In 1905 he married a woman, Helen, a schoolteacher and later assistant principal. Their daughter, Charlotte Becker, died less than a day after her birth in 1913. Helen Becker always believed that her husband was wrongfully convicted of murder.

== Reform movement ==
In 1902 and 1903, Becker was one of the leaders of a patrolman's reform movement agitating for the introduction of the three-platoon system. It would have significantly reduced the number of hours that the beat police officer was expected to work. In 1906, he was seconded to a special unit working out of police headquarters to probe the alleged corruption of Police Inspector Max F. Schmittberger. The inspector had earned enmity among patrolmen for giving detailed testimony to the 1894 Lexow Committee investigating police corruption in New York. Partly because of Becker's work, Schmittberger was subsequently prosecuted. Deputy Police Commissioner Rhinelander Waldo was so satisfied with Becker's work that when he was appointed as New York City Police Commissioner in 1911, Waldo appointed Becker, now a lieutenant, as head of one of the city's three anti-vice squads.

== Criminal activities ==
Becker allegedly used his position to extort substantial sums, later shown to total in excess of $100,000, from Manhattan brothels and illegal gambling casinos in exchange for immunity from police interference. Percentages of the take were regularly delivered to politicians and other policemen. The area was under the patronage of Tammany Hall's leader, Timothy "Big Tim" Sullivan.

Herman Rosenthal, a flamboyant Estonian immigrant who ran several illegal casinos in what was known as the Tenderloin District, was irritated by a police raid led by Becker on one of his casinos and the damage they left. He complained to the press that Becker "collected 20 percent of the take" there. In July 1912, Becker was reported by the New York World as one of three senior police officials involved in extorting money from Rosenthal's casinos. The day that Rosenthal was due to testify to a grand jury, he was murdered at 2 a.m. as he left the Hotel Metropole at 147 West 43rd Street, just off Times Square. Four gunmen, Louis "Lefty Louie" Rosenberg, Jacob "Whitey Lewis" Seidenschner, Frank "Dago Frank" Cirofici, and Harry "Gyp the Blood" Horowitz, were witnessed shooting him from their car, making no effort at disguise. They were separately tried, convicted, and sentenced to death and were ultimately executed.

The Manhattan District Attorney at the time, Charles S. Whitman, who had made an appointment to interview Rosenthal before he was murdered, alleged that the four gangsters had committed the murder at Becker's behest. Amid a major public outcry following the murder and extensive press coverage, Becker was transferred to the Bronx and assigned to desk duty.

== Arrest, trial, and execution ==
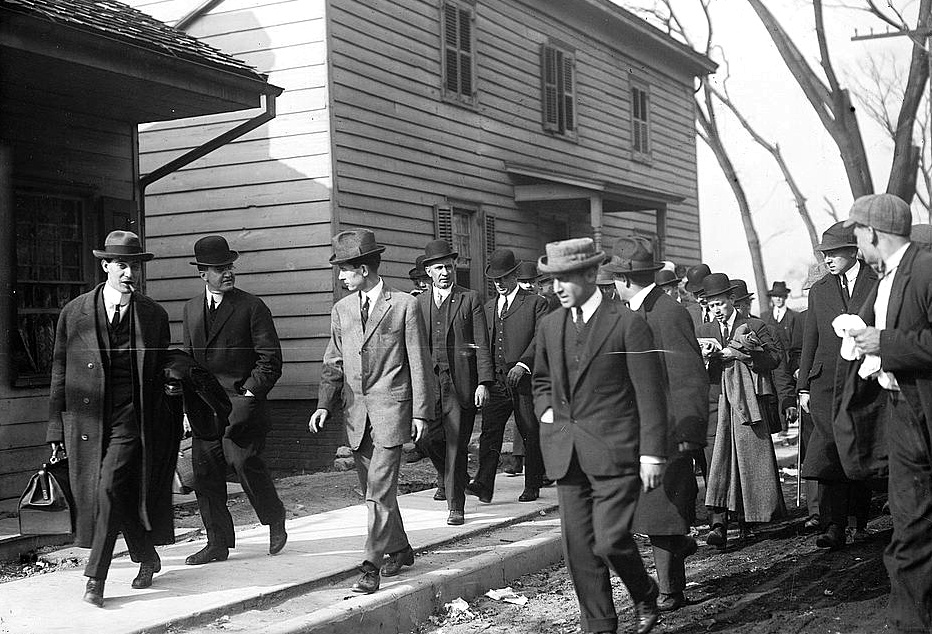
Becker (center) being escorted to Sing Sing

Whitman's office continued to investigate Becker. On July 29, 1912, Becker was arrested at the precinct's closing hour by special detectives from the District Attorney's Office. He was tried and convicted of first degree murder that fall in a trial presided by John Goff, who was "intensely biased against Becker" and whose charge to the jury was slanted toward conviction. The verdict was overturned on appeal on the grounds that Goff had been biased and that there was no independent corroborating witness to testify to the events since all of them had been involved in the crimes.

The case was retried in 1914 but Becker was convicted again and sentenced to death. He has been thought to be the "only policeman to be executed for murder in the history of the United States", but in fact two other members of the New York City Police Department have been executed for murder: William Ennis (executed on December 14, 1903) and John Brennan (executed on December 2, 1926).

Becker continued to profess his innocence. The day before his execution, Becker told the warden,

"Sure, I told them to put Rosenthal out of the way, but I didn't mean they should kill him. I wanted them to get him out of town so he wouldn't blab. Killing him was Rose's idea and the others. They wanted to save their own skins."

Jack Rose had served as a prosecution witness, as did Harry Vallon, Sam Schepps, and Bridgey Webber. They were underworld criminal figures who were believed to be involved in the crime but were promised immunity by the district attorney's office in exchange for testifying against Becker.

Charles Whitman, who was then Governor of New York, signed Becker's death warrant in 1915 and attended the execution. On July 30, 1915, Becker was executed in Sing Sing's electric chair by John Hulbert, New York's state electrician. The process took nine minutes, appearing to cause the man intense agony. For years afterward, it was described as "the clumsiest execution in the history of Sing Sing."

Becker was interred at Woodlawn Cemetery in the Bronx on August 2, 1915. He is buried next to his daughter.

== Controversy ==
Beginning with Henry Klein in 1927, a number of authors have suggested that Becker was wrongly convicted. Andy Logan wrote a thorough account of this position in her Against the Evidence (1970), as she became convinced of his innocence in the murder through her research. They suggest that Becker and his fellow officers had stood back and allowed "the street" to "take care of" Rosenthal since they knew that his co-operation with the district attorney's office would put a huge target on his back.

Three people have been identified as having a major stake of self-interest in Becker's prosecution for murder. Allegedly, District Attorney Whitman manipulated the evidence to implicate the corrupt Lieutenant. Becker was known to have assets that far exceeded his salary. However, for Whitman, gaining a guilty verdict for Becker in the sensational murder case would help his own political aspirations, and he is thought to have been elected as governor largely based on his success in that goal.

In addition, the reporter Herbert Bayard Swope publicized the case mercilessly in the press, representing the power of the New York World. He devoted much space to the conduct of the trial and individuals' testimony. Later, he said his reporting on the trial catapulted his career. Lastly, as noted above, Judge John Goff showed his bias and played a major role in gaining a guilty verdict from the jury.

New York police historian Thomas A. Reppetto believes that Becker was guilty because of the testimony of people involved but also he had a strong motive and had shown reckless behavior. The consensus continues to favor Becker's active involvement in the murder.

The Becker-Rosenthal murder case was explored by historian Mike Dash in his Satan's Circus: Murder, Vice, Police Corruption and New York's Trial of the Century (2007). He made no conclusion as to Becker's guilt in the murder.

== In popular culture ==
- The "Jack Rose" became a popular drink, named after the gambler who was a leading prosecution witness in the Becker trial after being given immunity by the district attorney.
- F. Scott Fitzgerald had his mob boss character Meyer Wolfsheim describe a fictionalized version of this murder in his novel The Great Gatsby.
- The Rosenthal murder case is featured in several novels, including:
  - Harry Stein’s 1983 novel Hoopla
  - Kevin Baker's 1999 novel Dreamland
  - Michael Bookman's self-published novel God's Rat: Jewish Mafia on the Lower East Side (2000)
