= Murder of Herman Rosenthal =

Murder of Herman Rosenthal and subsequent trial

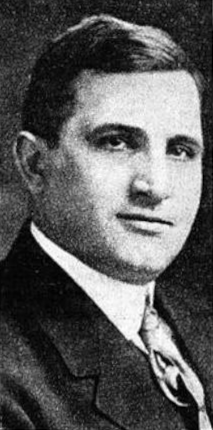
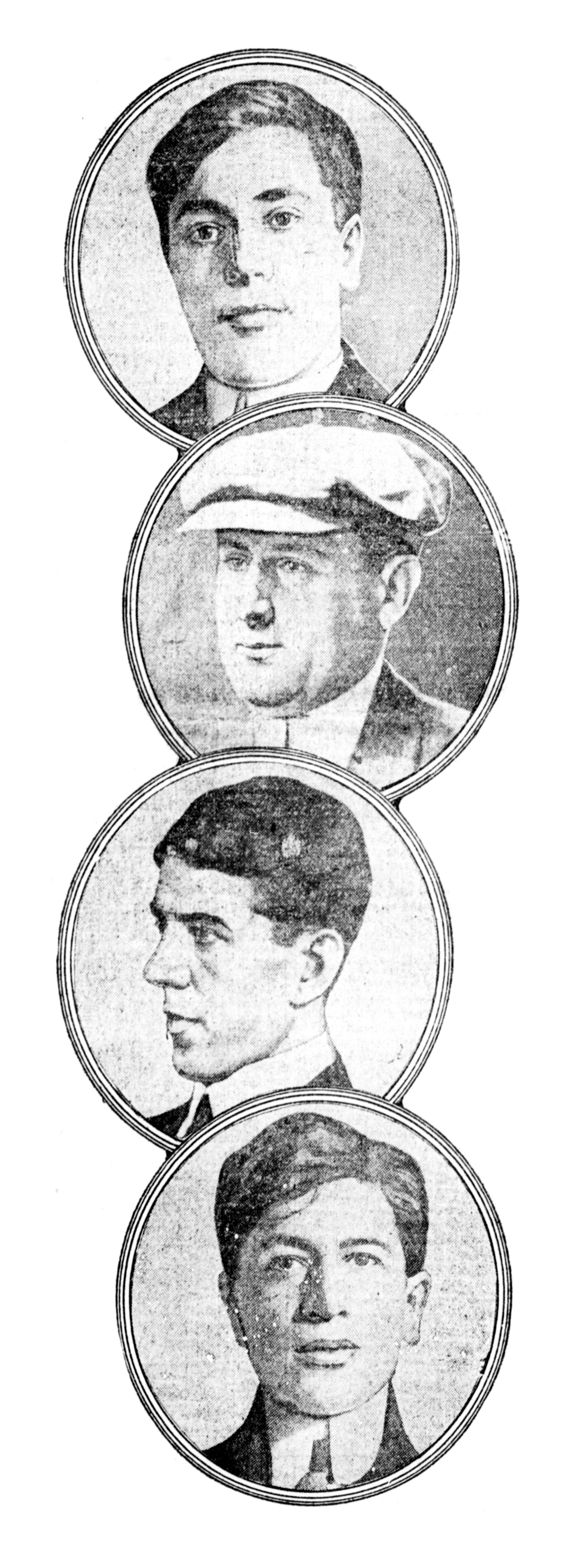
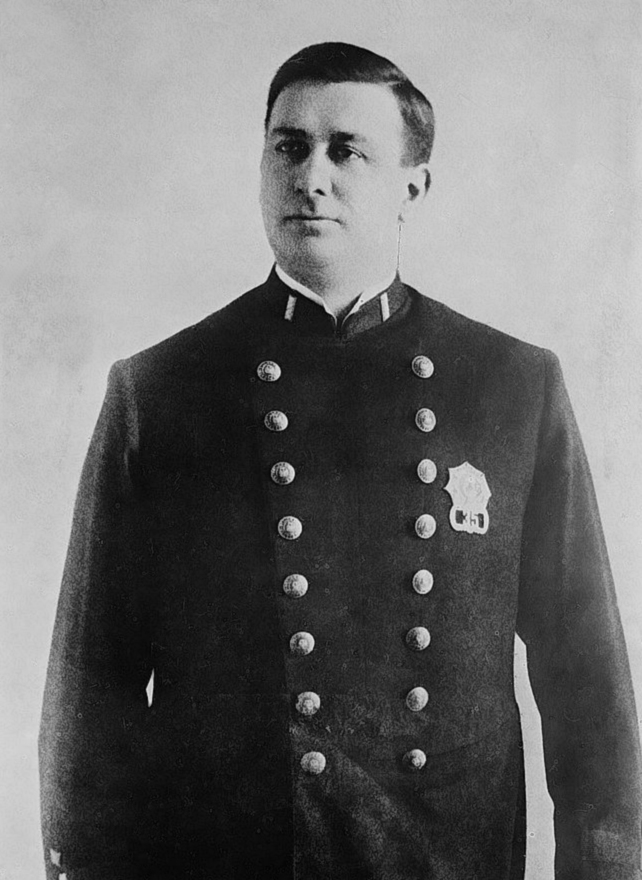
Herman Rosenthal, Officer Becker, and the four gangsters executed

The Becker–Rosenthal trial was a 1912 trial in New York City for the murder of Herman Rosenthal, a bookmaker, by NYPD Lieutenant Charles Becker and members of the Lenox Avenue Gang. The trial ran from October 7 to October 30, 1912, and restarted on May 2 to May 22, 1914. Other procedural events took place in 1915.

Thirty men, including former Lieutenant Becker, were convicted on murder charges and sentenced to death. Each was executed by the state at Sing Sing Prison.

== History ==
In July 1912, Lieutenant Charles Becker was named in the New York World as one of three senior police officials involved in the case of Herman Rosenthal, a small-time bookmaker and gambler who had complained to the press that his illegal casinos had been affected by the greed of Becker and his associates. Rosenthal accused the police of demanding a large percentage of his illegal profits as protection in exchange for allowing him to continue to operate.

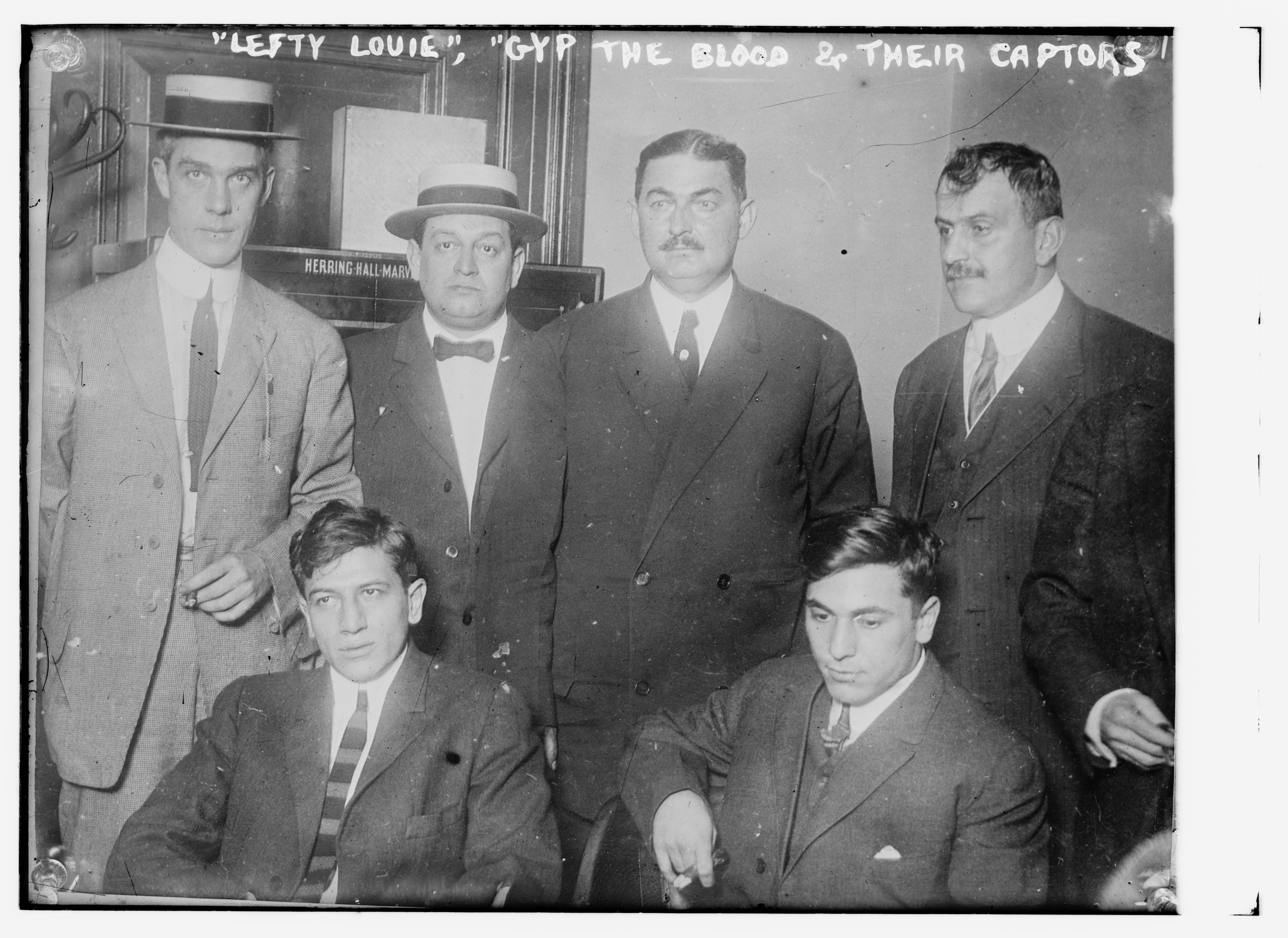
"Lefty Louis" Rosenberg and Gyp the Blood (seated in front row) after being arrested by police (standing)

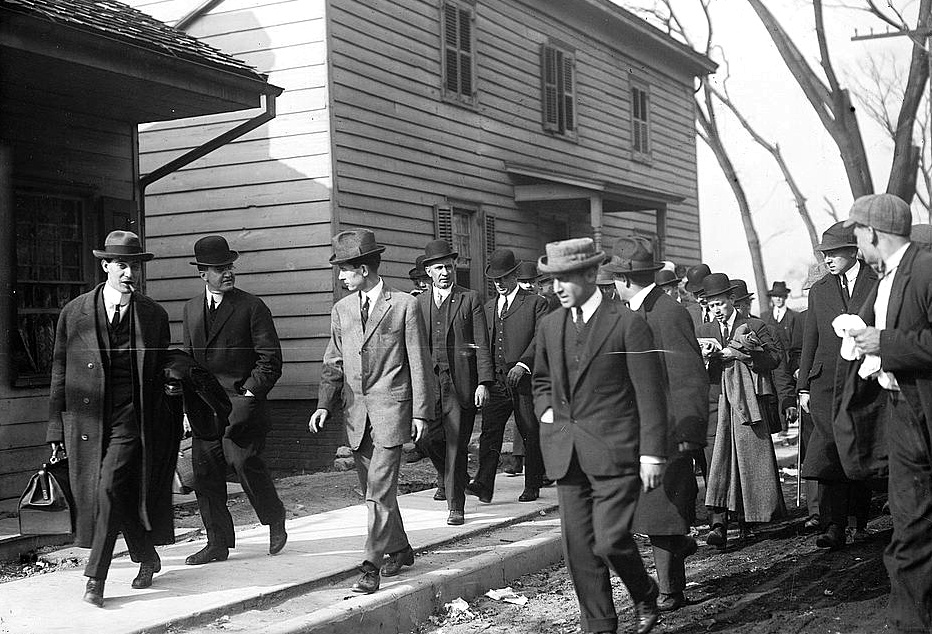
Charles Becker (center) being escorted to Sing Sing

At 2 a.m. on July 16, two days after the New York World article was published, Rosenthal was murdered on the street after leaving the Hotel Metropole at 147 West 43rd Street, just off Times Square. He was gunned down by men found to be a crew of Jewish gangsters from the Lower East Side. In the aftermath, Manhattan District Attorney Charles S. Whitman, who had made an appointment with Rosenthal before his death, said that he believed the gangsters had committed the murder at Becker's behest.

John J. Reisler, also known as "John the Barber", told the police that he had seen "Bridgey" Webber running away from the crime scene directly after the killing. After he recanted the next week, likely after being threatened by gangsters, he was charged with perjury.

The New York Times and other major newspapers covered the murder investigation for months, with the Times featuring it on the front page, as it led into complex criminal activities. The events were so complex that the New York Police Department recalled 30 detectives from retirement to help investigate and were said "to know most of the gangsters." One of the recalled detectives, Detective Frank Upton, formerly of the "Italian Squad," was instrumental in the July 25, 1912, arrest of "Dago" Frank Cirofici, one of the suspected killers. He and his companion, Regina Gorden (formerly known as "Rose Harris"), were "so stupefied by opium that they offered no objection to their arrests," according to The New York Times. The department then had one of its policewomen, Mary A. Sullivan, go undercover to gain the trust of Gorden. She befriended the woman as well as other girlfriends and wives of the suspects, which helped to break the case.

== Defendants ==
=== Convicted and sentenced to death ===
- Charles Becker (1870–1915), NYPD lieutenant charged with ordering the murder and having protected and extorted from illegal gamblers, executed
- Francisco Cirofici (1887–1914), aka Dago Frank, gunman, executed
- Harry Horowitz (1889–1914), aka Gyp the Blood, gunman, executed
- Louis Rosenberg (1891–1914), aka Lefty Louie and Louis Marks, gunman, executed
- Jacob Seidenshner (1888–1914), aka Frank Muller and Whitey Lewis, gunman, executed

=== Other participants in the case ===
- William Bourke Cockran (1854–1923), one of Becker's defense lawyers
- Martin Thomas Manton (1880–1946), one of Becker's defense lawyers at the trial.
- John B. Johnston (1882–1960), one of Becker's defense lawyers
- Sam Paul (1874–1927), gambler and owner of the club at which police first thought that the murder was planned.
- Jacob A. Rich (1877–1938), also known as Jack Sullivan and Jacob A. Reich, testified for Becker's defense.
- Jack Rose (1875–1947), aka Baldy Rose, gambler and informant who testified against Becker at the trial
- Herman Rosenthal, murdered bookmaker and gambler.
- Sam Schepps (1873-1936), also known as Schapps, mob informant who testified against defendants at the trial
- Frank Upton, Detective, father of Frances Upton, actress
- Harry Vallon, mob informant who testified against the defendants at the trial
- Louis William Webber (1877–1936), aka Bridgey Webber, mob informant who testified against the defendants at the trial
- Charles Seymour Whitman (1868–1947), district attorney, elected in 1914 as governor of New York
- Jack Zelig (1888–1912), murdered before he could testify for the prosecution.

== In popular culture ==
- The British writer P.G. Wodehouse wrote a foreword to his novel Psmith, Journalist (1914) that noted the Rosenthal case by way of showing how common gang murders in New York were at the time. He did not discuss the complicity of the police.
- In F. Scott Fitzgerald's novel The Great Gatsby (1925), the fictional gambler Meyer Wolfsheim mentions having been present in the Metropole with Rosenthal moments before the latter was murdered.
- The writer Viña Delmar wrote about the murder in Delmar, Viña (1968). The Becker Scandal: A Time Remembered. Harcourt, Brace & World.

== See also ==
- George Samuel Dougherty
