= Franklin Chase Hoyt =

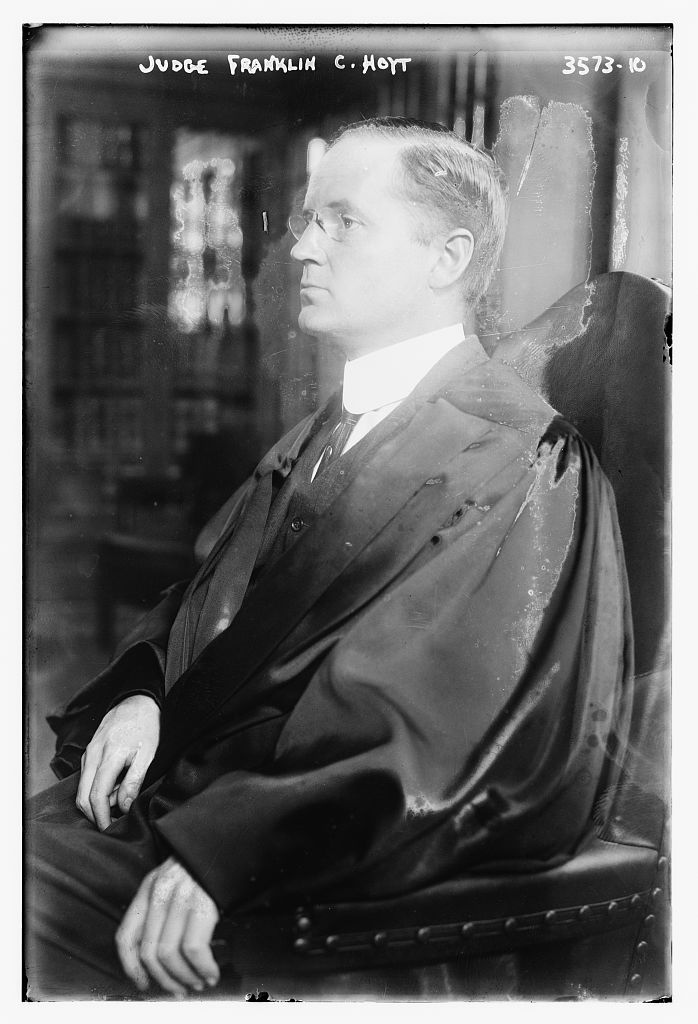
Franklin Chase Hoyt (1876–1937) in 1915

Franklin Chase Hoyt (September 7, 1876 – November 13, 1937) advocated for the establishment of a juvenile court in New York City. After the establishment, he was the presiding judge of the New York City Children's Court. He wrote the book Quicksands of Youth published by Charles Scribner's Sons in 1921.

== Biography ==
Franklin Chase Hoyt was born on September 7, 1876, in Pelham, New York to Janet Ralston Chase Hoyt. His grandfather was Salmon Portland Chase. He married Maud Rives Hoyt (1886–1982) and they had two daughters, Constance M. Hoyt. and Beatrix Hoyt. He retired in 1933. He died on November 13, 1937. He was buried at Wappingers Rural Cemetery.
