= James M. Clancy =

Warden of Sing Sing prison

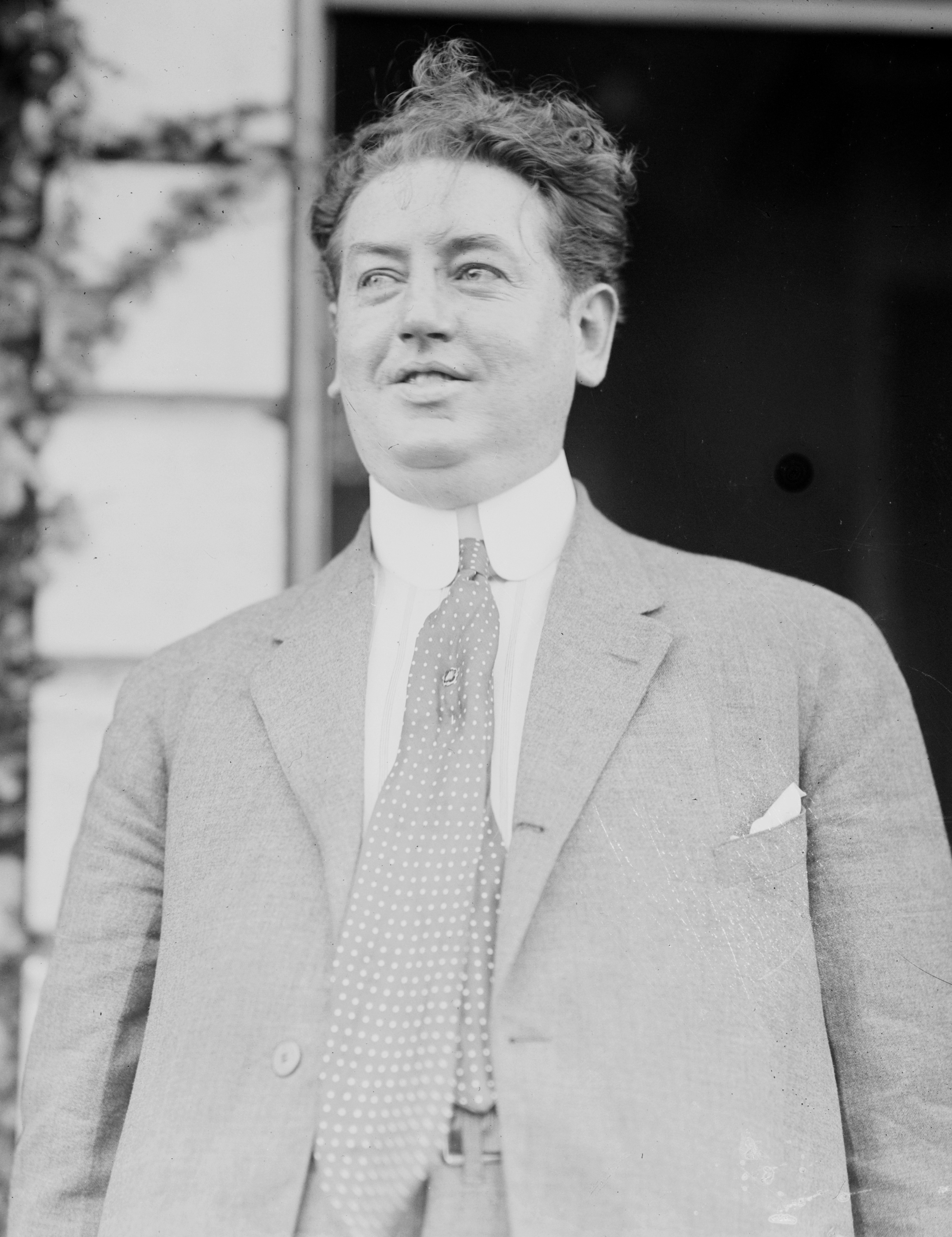
- Clancy at Sing Sing circa 1913

Warden of Sing Sing
- In office 1913–1914
- Governor: William Sulzer
- Preceded by: James Connaughton
- Succeeded by: Thomas McCormick

Personal details
- Born: c. 1875
- Died: February 27, 1919 Philadelphia, Pennsylvania, US

James M. Clancy (c. 1875 – February 27, 1919) was an American prison warden. He was the Warden of Sing Sing prison during the July 1913 fire.

== Biography ==
Clancy tried to resign in October 1913, then again in April 1914.

Clancy died in Philadelphia on February 27, 1919, at the age of 44.
