= Kevin Baker (author) =

American novelist (born 1958)

- Born: 1958 (age 67–68); Englewood, New Jersey, U.S.
- Education: Columbia University
- Occupations: Novelist; historian; journalist; political commentator
- Writing career
- Period: Abrams
- Genres: Realistic fiction, historical fiction, Nonfiction
- Subjects: New York City, history, urban affairs, politics, sports
- Notable awards: American Book Award
- Website: kevinbaker.info

Kevin Baker (born 1958) is an American novelist, historian, political commentator, and journalist.

== Early life ==
Baker was born in Englewood, New Jersey, and grew up in Rockport, Massachusetts. As a youth, he worked on the local newspaper Gloucester Daily Times, covering high school sports, as well as town meetings and other civic affairs. He graduated from Columbia University in 1980, with a major in political science.

== Career ==
In 1993, Baker's first book, Sometimes You See it Coming (1993), a contemporary baseball novel loosely based on the life of Ty Cobb, was published.

He was the chief historical researcher on Harold Evans’s illustrated history of the United States, The American Century (1998). He was a columnist ("In the News") for American Heritage magazine from 1998 to 2007. In 2009 appeared on C-SPAN's Washington Journal and The Colbert Report, to discuss the Obama presidency.

Baker is the author of the City of Fire trilogy, published by HarperCollins, which consists of the following historical novels: Dreamland (1999); the bestselling Paradise Alley (2002); and Strivers Row (2006). The middle volume of the trilogy won the 2003 James Fenimore Cooper Prize for Best Historical Fiction and the 2003 American Book Award. Paradise Alley was also chosen by bestselling Angela's Ashes author, Frank McCourt, as a Today show book club selection.

In 2009, he wrote Luna Park, a graphic novel illustrated by Croatian artist Danijel Žeželj.

A writer of over 200 newspaper and magazine articles, Baker was the recipient of a 2017 Guggenheim fellowship for non-fiction.

Baker lives in New York City, where he is a contributing editor to Harper's Magazine and a regular contributor to The New York Times and The New York Times Book Review.

== Bibliography ==
- The New York Game: Baseball and the Rise of a New City (2024)
- The Fall of a Great American City: New York and the Urban Crisis of Affluence (2019)
- Sometimes You See It Coming (1993)
- The American Century (1998; with Harold Evans and Gail Buckland)
- Dreamland (1999)
- Paradise Alley (2002)
- “Rudy Giuliani and the Myth of Modern New York” (2005; in America's Mayor: The Hidden History of Giuliani's New York)
- “Lost-Found Nation: The Last Meeting Between Elijah Muhammad and W.D. Fard" (2006; in I Wish I'd Been There)
- Strivers Row (2006)
- Luna Park (2011; with artist Danijel Žeželj)
- The Big Crowd (2013)
- Becoming Mr. October (2014)
- America The Ingenious: How a Nation of Dreamers, Immigrants, and tTnkerers changed the world (2016)
