= Harry Vallon =

American mob informant

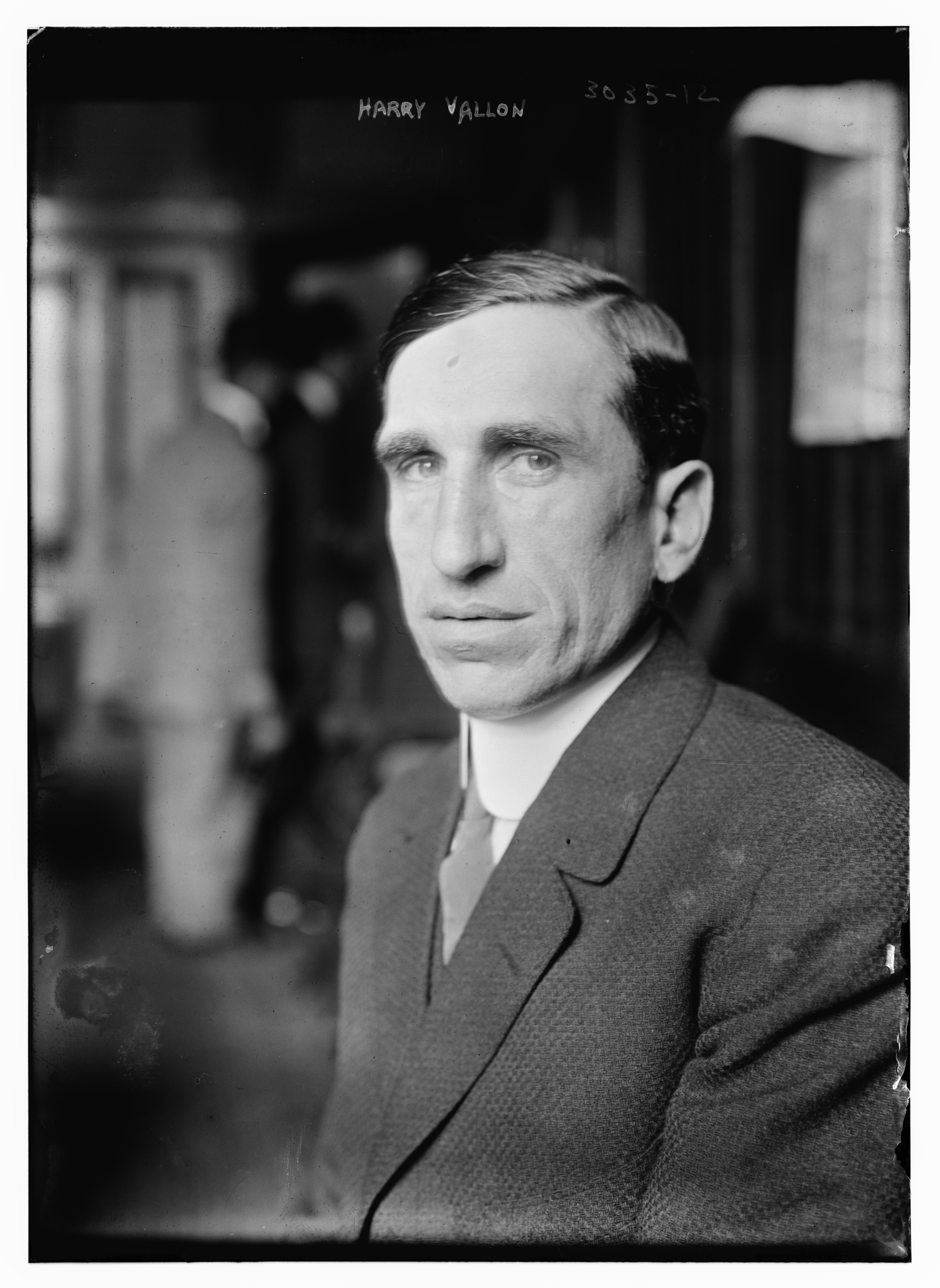
Vallon circa 1915

Harry Vallon was a New York City gambler and mob informant. He turned state's evidence and testified against the gunman in the murder of Herman Rosenthal and against Charles Becker after a promise of immunity from the district attorney. He testified as one of four mob informants, along with Bridgey Webber, Jack Rose, and Sam Schepps at the Becker-Rosenthal trial. Based upon his testimony, Charles Becker, along with the four gunmen involved in the murder, were convicted and sentenced to death. In 1936, he was threatened with rearrest in the case.
