= William Webber (criminal) =

American gangster

Louis William "Bridgie" Webber (1877 – July 30, 1936) was an underworld figure in New York City and a former associate of gang leader Monk Eastman who later testified against police lieutenant Charles Becker during his murder trial in 1912.

== Biography ==
He was born in 1877. Starting around 1900 he and Harry Vallon operated various stuss games as well as an opium den on Pell Street and a popular poker room at the corner of 42nd Street and Sixth Avenue which was often frequented by Becker and other police officials (and thus never subject to police raids).

In 1911, two thugs were hired by gambler Herman Rosenthal to assault Webber, who left him severely beaten. When Rosenthal further attempted to lure customers away from Webber's Sans Souci Music Hall, Webber used his political connections to have Rosenthal's Hesper Club raided by police, but other sources claim he had been hired by Rosenthal for protection from Charles Becker to whom Rosenthal had refused to pay off for running his gambling operations at the Hesper Club and that he was severely beaten by Jack Zelig and members of the Eastman Gang, who destroyed his clubhouse as well.

Brought into custody by a police detective two days following Rosenthal's murder, Webber claimed he had been at his clubhouse during the night. Although he was held in custody, his testimony against Becker and members of the Lenox Avenue Gang helped convict the five men who were sentenced to death.

Fearing reprisals from the city's underworld, he was under police guard after his testimony and traveled to Cuba. Shortly after his return to the city, Webber was stabbed by an unidentified youth on July 14, 1913 and fled New York. He became a successful manufacturer in Passaic, New Jersey for a number of years and later served as vice president and secretary of the Garfield Paper Box Company.

He later died of peritonitis while he was undergoing surgery for appendicitis at St. Mary's Hospital or Passaic General Hospital on the night of July 30, 1936 on the 21st anniversary of Becker's execution. His funeral was attended by over 300 people, including Mayor Benjamin F. Turner.
