= Hotel Metropole (New York City) =

Historic hotel in Manhattan, New York

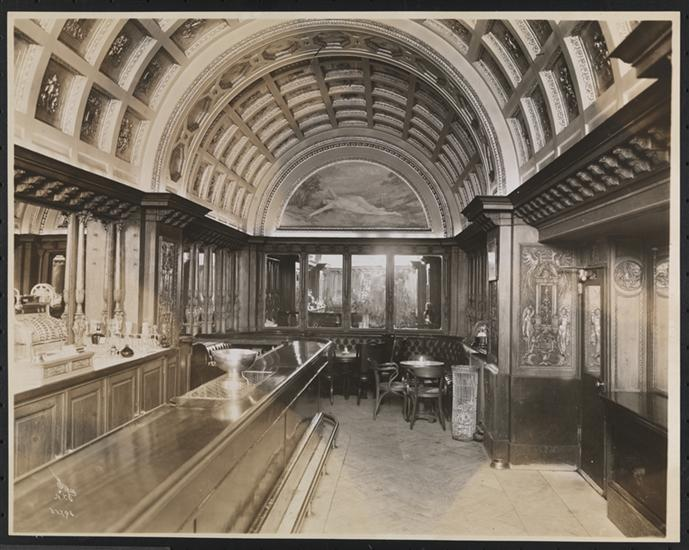
- Hotel café as it appeared in 1913

General information
- Address: 147 West 43rd Street
- Town or city: Manhattan, New York City
- Country: United States
- Coordinates: 40.7563°N 73.9855°W
- Opened: 1910

Technical details
- Floor count: 6

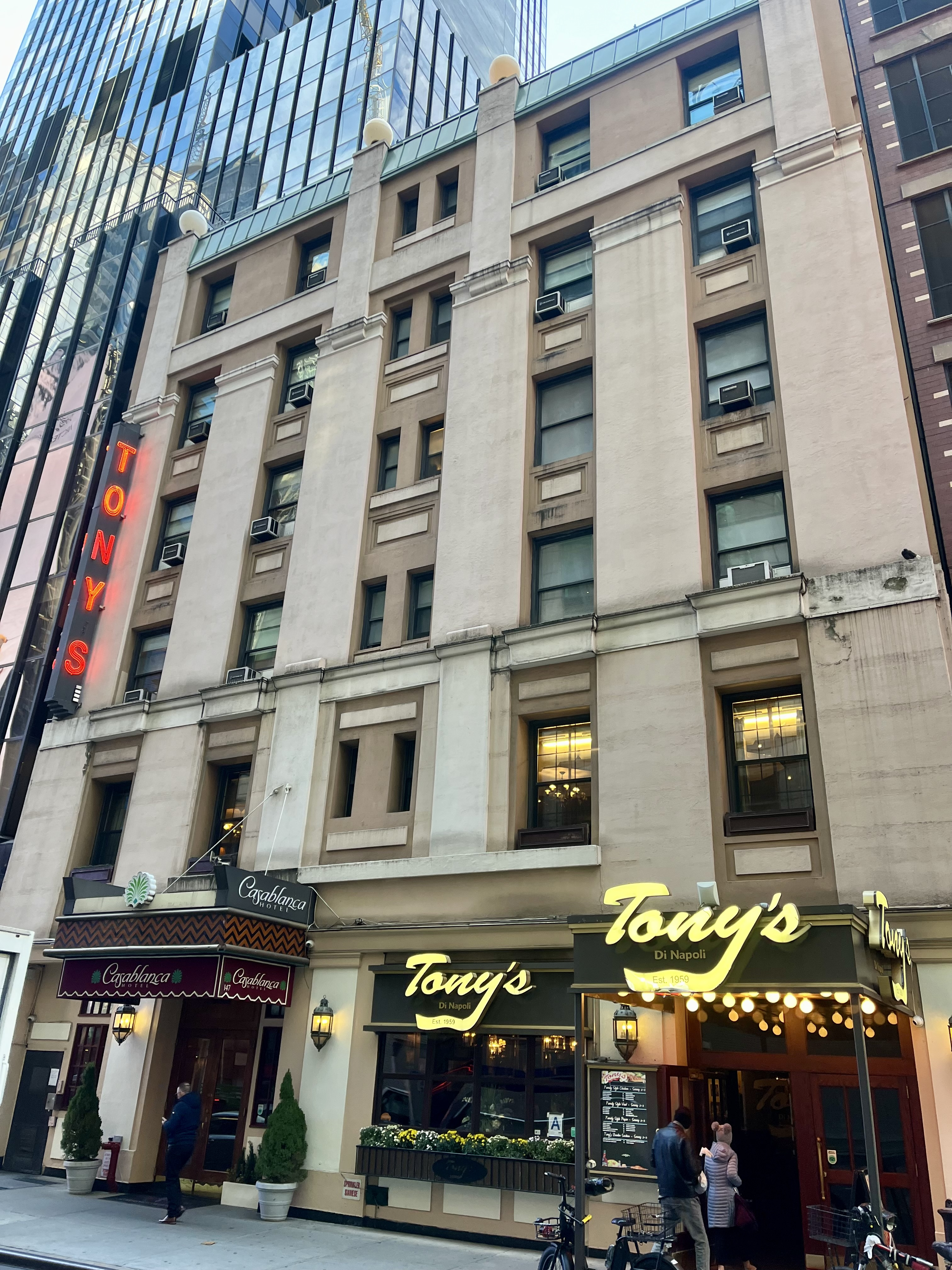
Casablanca Hotel in 2023

The Casablanca Hotel Times Square, formerly the Hotel Metropole, is a hotel in Manhattan, New York City, at 147 West 43rd Street just off Times Square. It was the city's first hotel to have running water in every room. The Metropole had a list of notable residents including Nick Arnstein and Western lawman-turned-sports writer Bat Masterson.

In the early morning hours of July 16, 1912, the hotel was the site of the murder of Herman Rosenthal. Rosenthal was the owner of several New York gambling dens. This murder was allegedly at the behest of Charles Becker, a New York police detective who was executed in 1915 for that murder. James Thurber wrote an article about this called "Two O'Clock at the Metropole".

The Metropole's reputation for attracting gamblers is referenced in F. Scott Fitzgerald's 1925 novel The Great Gatsby. It appears in the dialogue as the location of a restaurant favored by Meyer Wolfsheim. The hotel was where Joshua Shapira stayed in Little Odessa.

The Hotel Metropole later became the Hotel Rosoff and is now the Casablanca Hotel.

== See also ==
- List of former hotels in Manhattan
- Metropole Cafe
