= Batschari =

German tobacco products manufacturer

Zigarettenfabrik A. Batschari
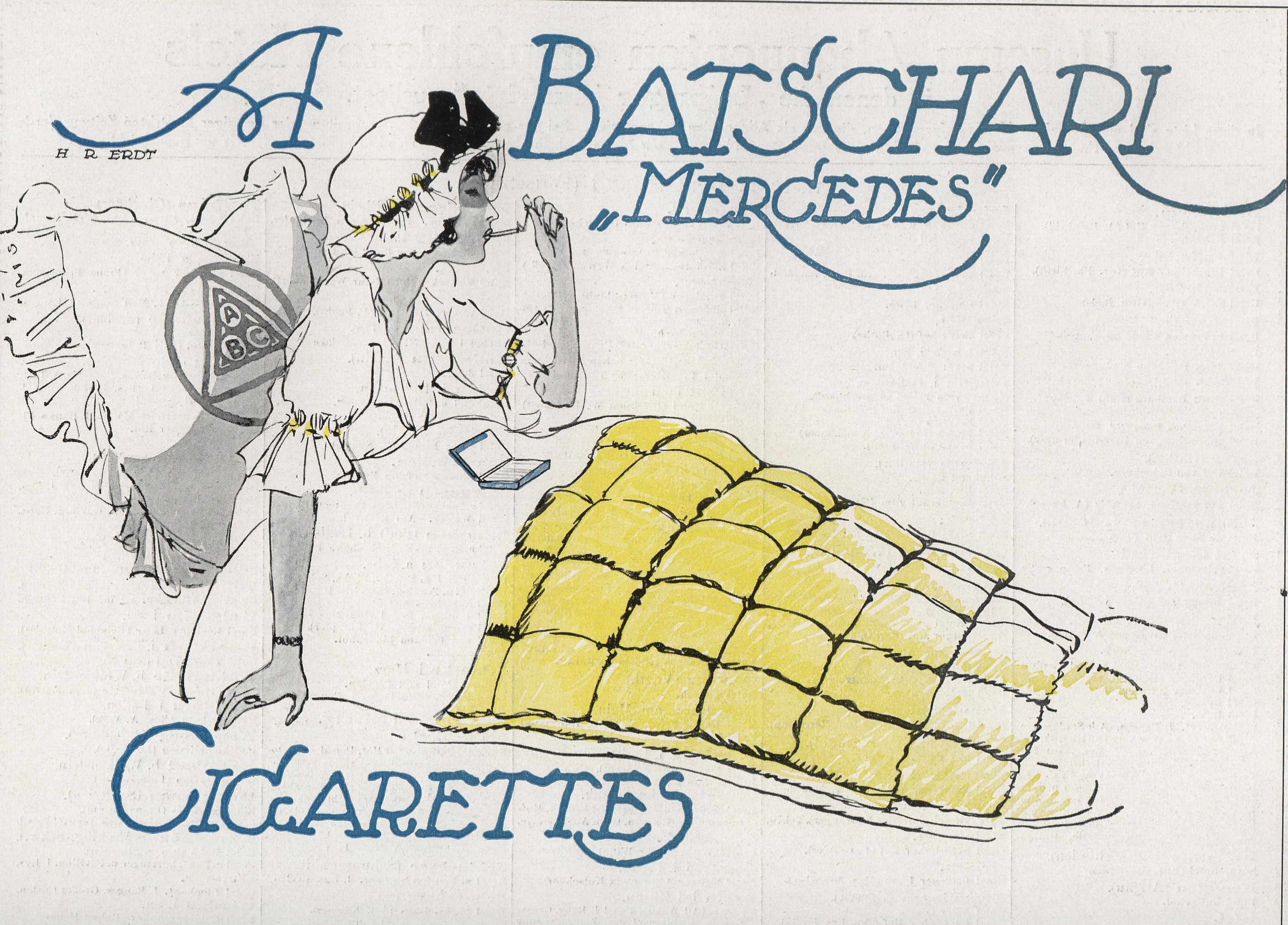
- Batschari advertising by Hans Rudi Erdt
- Industry: Tobacco
- Founded: 1834
- Founder: August Batscharis
- Defunct: 1957
- Headquarters: Baden-Baden, Germany
- Parent: Reemtsma

The Zigarettenfabrik A. Batschari was a German cigar and cigarette manufacturer established in 1834 in Baden-Baden by August Batscharis. Along with other cigarette manufacturers of the period like Josef Garbáty and Manoli, Batschari was at the time a patron of the arts, employing famous artists such as Hans Rudi Erdt, Ivo Puhonny, Lucian Bernhard and Ludwig Hohlwein to produce advertising material. Today, vintage Batschari enamel signs, glass plates, cigarette boxes and posters are popular collector's items.

== History ==
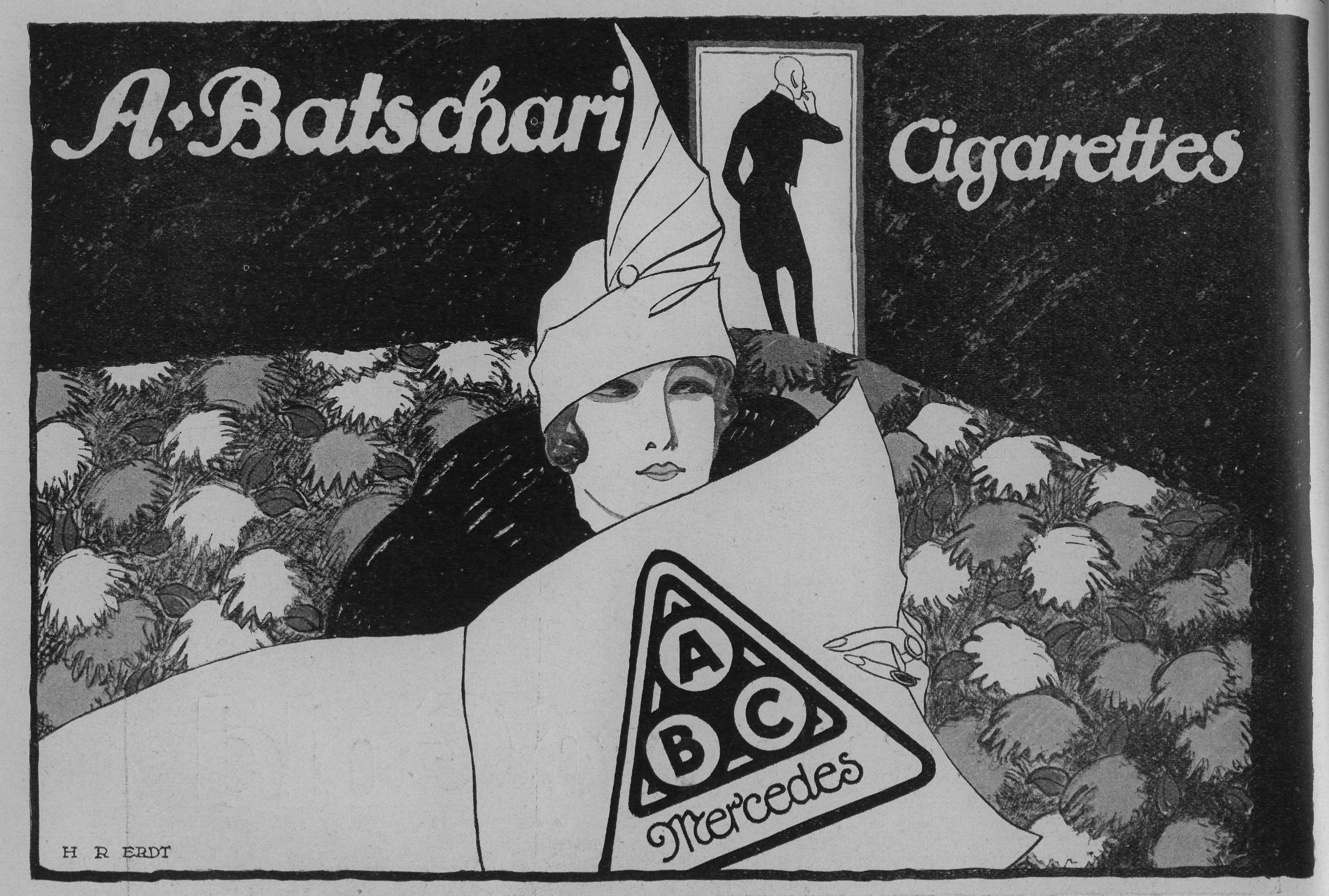
1914 newspaper advertising for the Mercedes cigarette brand

Heinrich Reinboldt, August Batscharis' father in law, produced high-quality handmade cigars in a rented house, with some financial success. A short time later he moved production to a small factory. Batscharis subsequently took over the business, increasing the daily production from 110,000 cigarettes per year in 1899 to up to more than three million. Between 1908 and 1909 Batscharis commissioned the construction of a large factory called Batscharifabrik in Baden-Baden, between the Balzenberg and Mozart streets. The ABC cigarette marque was by then known beyond Germany, and the company had outlets in most major European cities as well as in Madison Avenue in New York. During the period of radioactive quackery in the early 20th century, Batschari also produced a brand of "Radium" radioactive cigarettes.

In 1912 the Batscharis family lost control of the company due to what amounted to a hostile takeover by the BAT Company, who purchased a 40% voting stake in their bid to become the dominant tobacco product manufacturer in Germany.

Batschari began to encounter financial difficulties in the wake of the global economic crisis of the 1920s, exacerbated by large tax increases and debt, which threatened the existence of the company and forced the city government to subsidize it with public funding to avoid losing its almost 2,000 jobs. The Batschari holdings were subsequently acquired by the Reemtsma Group, which produced the "Mercedes" brand name cigarettes until 1965.

=== Fate of the Batscharifabrik ===
The 18,000 square meter Batschari manufacturing facility is considered a landmark in Baden-Baden, and came to be known as Batschari Palais. In the early 20th century it was used by the Bundeswehr for clothing storage, until it was abandoned in 2004, precipitating a conservation controversy in the city. In 2006 the building was acquired by the German development company Arcona and refurbished into a luxury hotel.

== See also ==
- List of cigar brands
