= Ione Biggs =

American human rights activist (1916–2005)

- Born: Ione Kenny; May 6, 1916; Central, Cleveland, Ohio
- Died: December 16, 2005 (aged 89); Cleaveland, Ohio
- Occupations: Police officer, court clerk, activist
- Awards: Ohio Women's Hall of Fame

Ione Biggs (May 6, 1916 – December 16, 2005) was an advocate for human rights and world peace. She worked with numerous community organizations and was involved with multiple women organizations for the United Nations. Biggs was inducted into the Ohio Women's Hall of Fame in 1983.

== Biography ==
Biggs was born in Central, Cleveland, Ohio, on May 6, 1916. She graduated from Central High School and started working for the city's recreation department in 1934. She joined Cleveland's police force in 1943, one of the first African-American women officers on the force. Having grown frustrated with both the racism and sexism she encountered, she left the police force in 1955 and started working as a clerk for Cleveland's municipal court. Through 1975, she only received 2 pay raises, and eventually discovered that "men were paid more than women and whites were paid more than blacks". She filed a complaint, eventually winning a settlement against the court.

Biggs marched in protest to the Vietnam War in the 1960s. In 1985, she attended the United Nations International Conference on Women in Nairobi, Kenya. In 1994, she organized Cleveland's delegation to the United Nations Fourth World Conference on Women.

Biggs was the president of the Cleveland branch of Women Speak Out for Peace and Justice, itself a chapter of the Women's International League for Peace and Freedom. She also pushed for the United States to ratify the Convention on the Elimination of All Forms of Discrimination Against Women. For the 1980 film 9 to 5, Biggs had the opportunity to advise Jane Fonda on aspects of the script.

== Death and legacy ==
Biggs died on December 16, 2005. She had been praised by congressman Louis Stokes on her fight for the "forlorn and oppressed".

She was inducted into the Ohio Women's Hall of Fame in 1983, who described her as an "advocate for world peace and social justice". In 2000, she was honored by the National Coalition of 100 Black Women for her advocacy on human rights. In 2002, she was awarded the Nelson Mandela World Leader Medal.

The Northeast Ohio Coalition for the Homeless awards the Ione Bigg Social Justice Award in honor of her advocacy.

== See also ==
- Women in policing in the United States
