= Helen Haiman Joseph =

American puppeteer and author (1888–1978)

- Born: August 28, 1888; Atlanta, Georgia, U.S.
- Died: August 15, 1978 (aged 89)

Helen Haiman Joseph (August 28, 1888 – August 15, 1978) was an American puppeteer and author. Known as the "grandmother of American puppetry", she published plays, books, along with puppeteering nationally.

== Early life ==
Helen Lowenthan Haiman was born in Atlanta, Georgia, on August 28, 1888. Her father and mother were Elias and Frances Lowenthan Haiman respectively. Her father owned a farm tool factory. When she was 7, her family moved to Cleveland where she eventually attended Central High School. She then attended and graduated from the College for Women of Western Reserve University (now Case Western Reserve University) with a B.A. in 1910.

== Career ==
=== Early career ===
After graduating from Case Western Reserve University in 1910, she was involved with the Cleveland Play House. Originally acting in minor roles in plays, the director recommended she join the upcoming marionette troupe in which she did and that was the start of her puppetry career. Her first puppet production was "The Death of Tintagiles". From 1914 to 1920, she directed and produced marionette plays at the Cleveland Play House.

=== First book, European tour, and establishment of Pinocchio Players ===
In 1920, Joseph published her first book A Book of Marionettes, which is considered the first "definitive and authoritative" English language book on the subject of puppetry history. The book was a major success and received praise internationally. The following year she graduated from Vassar College with her second B.A. in 1921.

Starting in 1921, she then embarked on a three-year tour in Europe to study and interact with various European puppetry traditions and learn from the European puppet community. It was also at this time she wrote the puppetry section in Encyclopædia Britannica.

Returning to United States in 1924, she started her own puppet theater "Pinocchio Players" where she wrote and produced her own plays. The theater performed in schools, hospitals, clubs, and other venues around the United States.

In 1927, she published her second book Ali Baba and Other Plays for Puppets and in 1929 published a revised version of her first book A Book of Marionettes.

=== Continued career in Pinocchio Players and WW2 hiatus ===
By the 1930s, Pinocchio Players performed to thousands of children every year. In 1932, she published her third and final book Little Mr. Clown, which is a children's book based on Joseph's original puppet plays. She also started her own series of Mr. Clown marionettes toys.

In 1938, she became the director of puppet productions of Cain Park Theater in Cleveland Heights, Ohio.

Due to the United States involvement in WW2, her career as a puppeteer went on hiatus as many members of her troupe were drafted. During this hiatus, she worked in a bullet factory and as a copywriter for Fuller, Smith, and Ross advertising firm. After the war's end in 1945, she continued on with her marionette troupe touring the USA.

== Personal life ==
=== Marriages and children ===
In 1918, she married Ernest A. Joseph. Ernest came from the prominent German-Jewish Joseph family, known for the operation of the Joseph and Feiss Company, which at the time was one of the largest manufacturers of men clothing in the United States. She met Ernest, who was a trustee of the play house. They had two daughters, Anne and Ernestine. Ernest died the following year in 1919.

=== Activism and philanthropy ===
She was a member and served on the Cleveland Women's City Club, the League of Women Voters, and the Consumer's League. She was also an early charter member of Puppeteers of America during its founding in the 1930s.

She donated marionettes to the Detroit Institute of the Arts from 1917 to 1935.

=== Correspondence and unfinished works ===
The New York Public Library holds documents including Joseph's correspondence, unfinished works, and notes ranging from 1917 to 1959. The unfinished works include a partially finished autobiography and plays. The correspondence includes her letters to her family and friends. Notable correspondents including Ernest Bloch, Genevieve Taggard, and Ivo Puhonny. It also includes letters praising her first book A Book of Marionettes.
