= Central High School (Cleveland) =

Public high school in Cleveland, Ohio

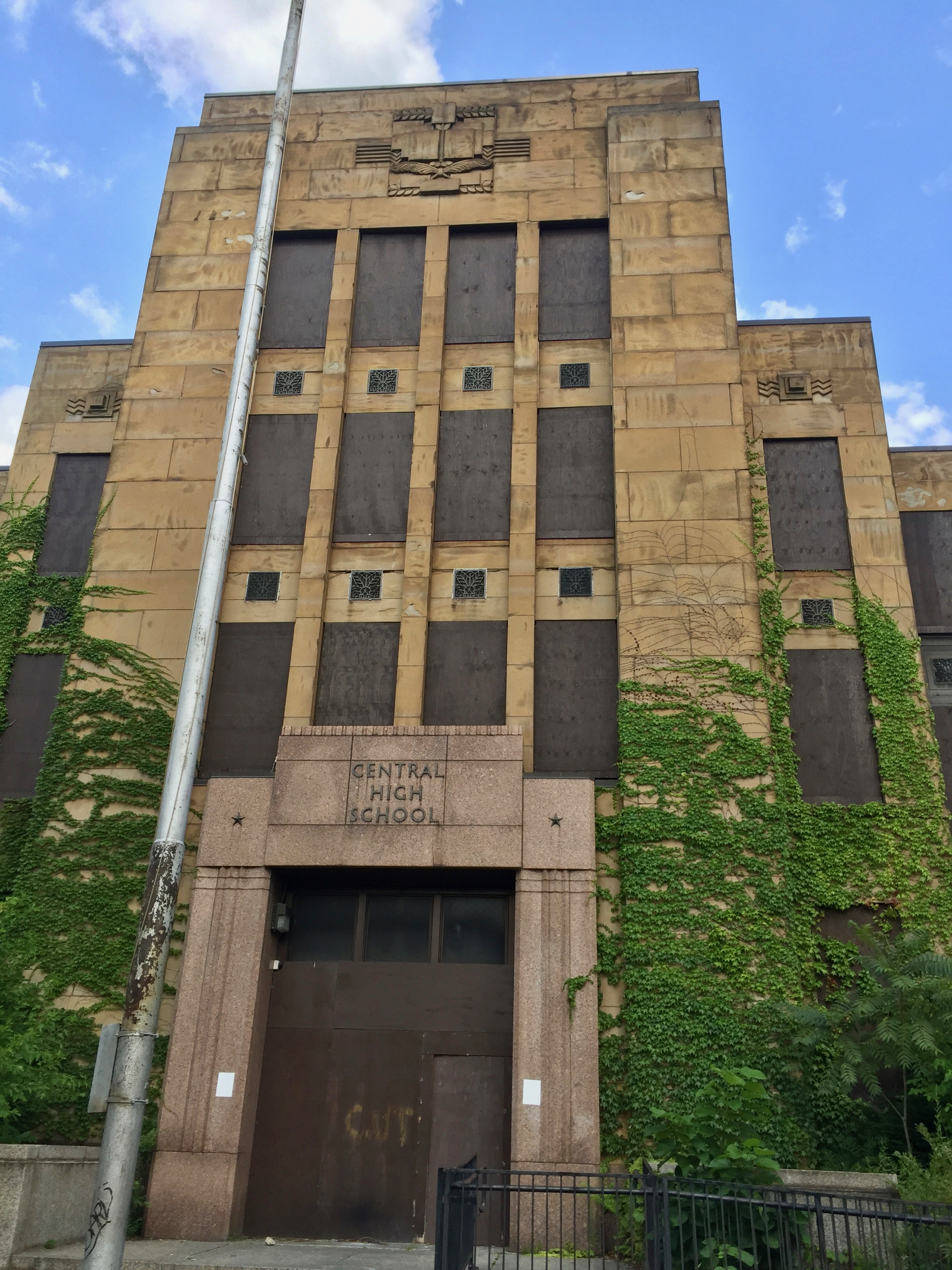
- Cleveland, Ohio; United States

Information
- Type: High school
- Established: 1846
- Closed: 1952

Central High School was a public high school in the Central neighborhood of Cleveland, Ohio. It was established in 1846 and merged with East Technical High School in 1952. It had multiple locations during its existence.

== History ==
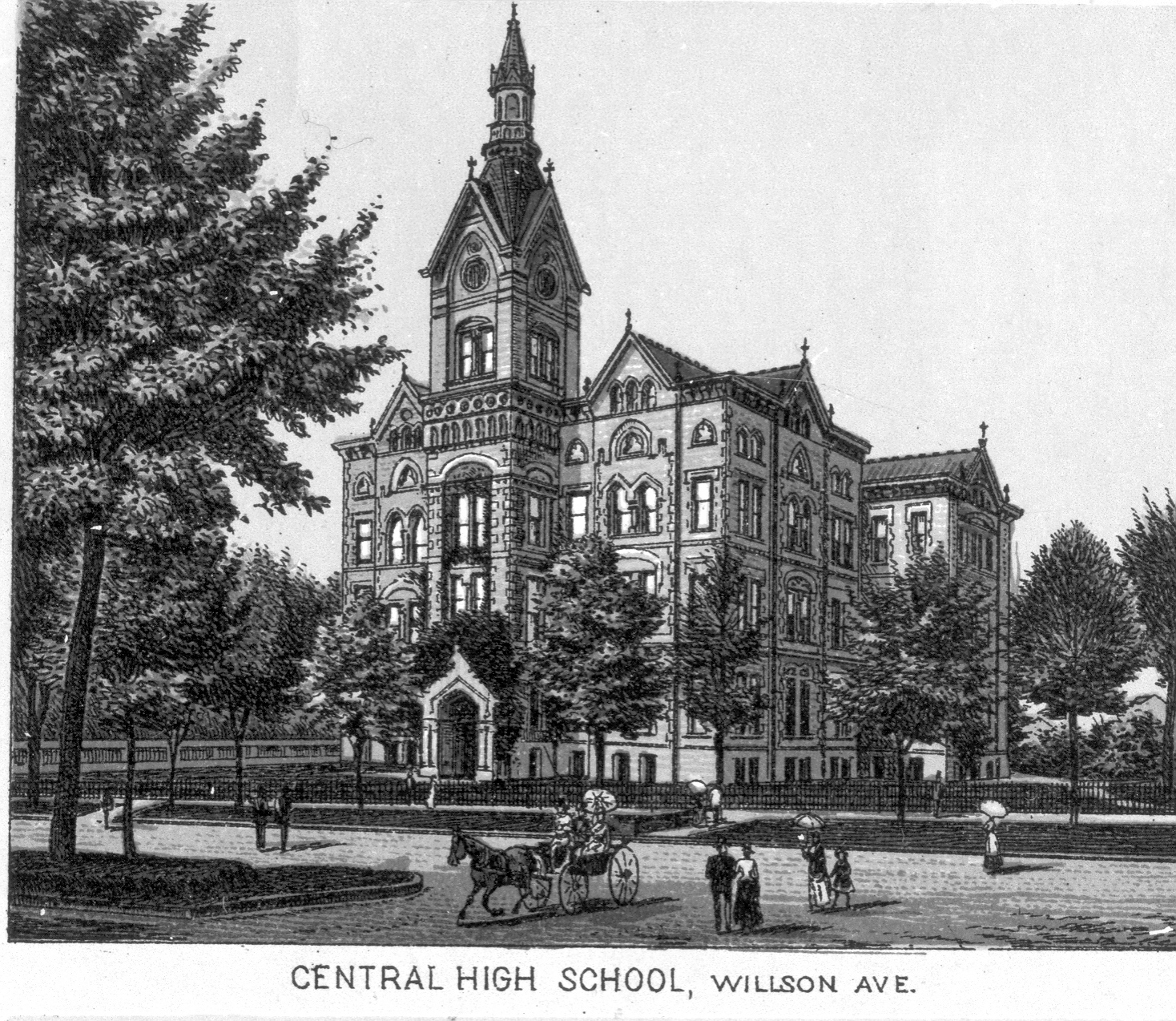
Home of Central High from 1878 to 1940

Central High School was established in 1846 as the first high school in Cleveland and the first free public high school west of the Alleghenies. Initially, classes were held in the basement of the Universalist church on Prospect Avenue. After Ohio City was annexed to Cleveland, West High School was established as a division of the school since state law allowed only one public high school in Cleveland.

Central High School moved to its own building in 1856, a brick and stone building that stood at the southwest corner of what is now East Ninth Street and Euclid Avenue. This was in use until 1878, when a larger, gothic style building, featuring a large clock tower donated by alumna Laura Spelman Rockefeller, opened at 2201 East 55th Street. This building served as the home of CHS until 1940, when a new building opened. The 1878 structure continued in use as a junior high until it was razed in 1952 and an elementary school, George Washington Carver Elementary School, was built on the site.

In December 1900, the Cleveland chapter of Gamma Sigma Fraternity was organized at Central High School. The chapter was first projected to start at the end of 1899. The contention of the faculty was that the fraternity should have faculty members be represented. The boys refused to permit this so the idea was dropped for a short time. Opposition was dropped by making the fraternity an interscholastic one, where students of all Cleveland high schools being eligible to join. 'Mu' chapter was the 11th chartered chapter since Gamma Sigma first formed in October 1869 at The Brockport Normal School in Brockport New York.

The final home of Central High School was built in 1940, at 2225 East 40th Street. This building served as the home of CHS until 1952, when the school was merged with East Technical High School. Following the merger the 1940 CHS building remained in use for many years as Stokes Elementary School, named for Louis and Carl Stokes. It closed in 2013 as part of a district reorganization plan. As of 2023, however, the 1940 CHS building still stands, though is vacant.

=== Ohio High School Athletic Association State Championships ===
- Boys Track - 1947, 1949

== Notable teachers ==
- Helen Maria Chesnutt, among the earliest women of color in American classical education

== Alumni ==
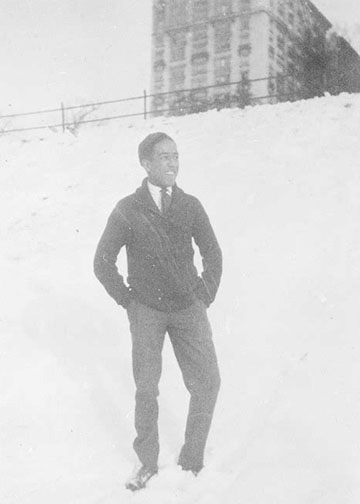
Langston Hughes at Central High

- Ione Biggs, human rights activist
- Charles Francis Brush, inventor and industrialist
- Benjamin O. Davis Jr., first African-American to graduate from West Point since 1889 and first African-American brigadier general in the USAF promoted to four-star general
- Harry Edward Davis, lawyer and Ohio state legislator
- Russell Howard Davis, educator, activist, and historian, later returned to the school as principal
- Ed Delahanty professional baseball player in Major League Baseball from 1888 to 1903
- Marcus A. Hanna, businessman and U.S. Senator. Served as Chairman of the Republican National Committee
- Langston Hughes, poet, social activist, novelist, playwright, and columnist
- Helen Haiman Joseph, the "grandmother of American puppetry" because of her practical and scholarly knowledge of marionettes
- John D. Rockefeller, businessman and philanthropist
- John L. Severance, industrialist and philanthropist
- Noble Sissle, African-American composer, bandleader and vocalist
- Laura Spelman, educator and philanthropist; namesake of Spelman College
- Thaddeus Spratlen, business school professor
- Louis Stokes, attorney, civil rights pioneer, and politician who served 15 terms in the US House of Representatives
