= St. Paul's Episcopal Church (Cleveland) =

Historic church in Ohio, United States

- U.S. National Register of Historic Places
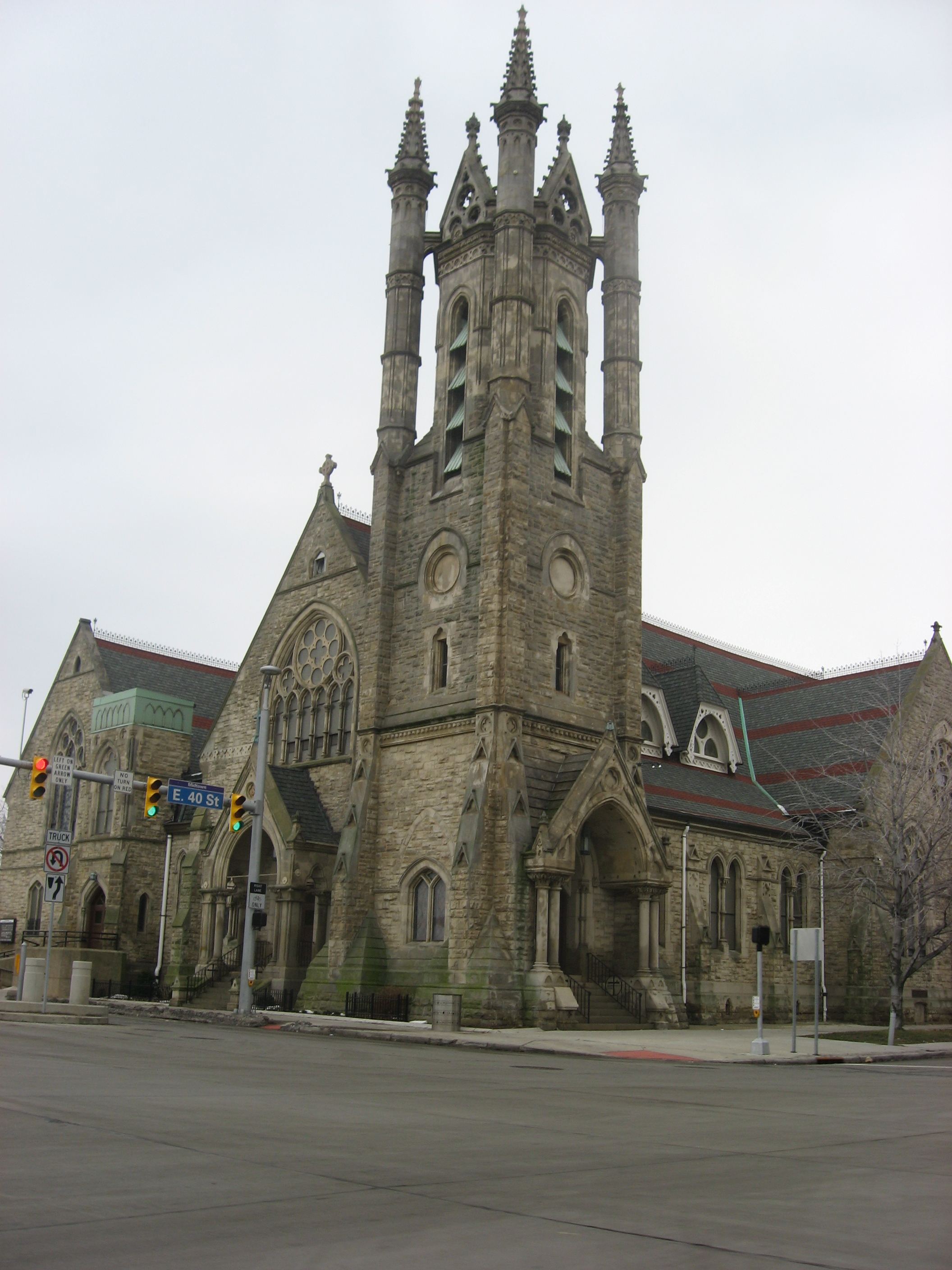
- Front and western side

- Location within Cleveland Location within Ohio Location within the United States
- Location: 4120 Euclid Ave. Cleveland, Ohio
- Coordinates: 41°30′12″N 81°39′28″W
- Area: Less than 1 acre (0.40 ha)
- Built: 1876
- Architect: Gordon W. Lloyd; Andrew Dall
- Architectural style: Gothic Revival
- NRHP reference No.: 80002979
- Added to NRHP: November 25, 1980

The former St. Paul's Episcopal Church is a historic church in Cleveland, Ohio, United States. Built for an Episcopal parish by a well-known architect, it became a prominent component of the city's wealthy Millionaire's Row, due to its grand architecture. Although vacated by its original owners in the 1920s, it was soon bought by a Catholic monastic group that occupies it into the present day. It was named a historic site in 1980.

== History ==
St. Paul's Episcopal Church was founded in late 1846, and for two years the parishioners worshipped in a hotel before constructing a building at Fourth and Euclid downtown. A fire destroyed the structure before it was completed, but people throughout the city contributed funds to build a brick replacement in 1851. By the 1870s, the streets surrounding the church had become primarily commercial, so the vestry sold the building and rented halls while building the present church eastward on Euclid Avenue. Its placement amid the wealthy Millionaire's Row district soon caused it to become a symbol of the neighborhood. However, the membership gradually moved farther eastward, and in 1928 a new building was constructed in Cleveland Heights. Meanwhile, the Roman Catholic Diocese of Cleveland was seven years into the process of establishing a monastery for perpetual Eucharistic adoration by the Poor Clares. Two years after the Episcopalians had moved eastward, they sought to sell the old building, and the Catholic diocese bought it for monastic use. A new Catholic parish, dedicated to St. Paul like the original occupants, was erected in 1949 to worship on the property; it remains to the present.

== Architecture and construction ==
St. Paul's church building is one of just six Gothic Revival churches built in Cleveland during the 1870s that survived into the 1980s. At one time considered Cleveland's grandest and largest church, it is distinguished by the unusual architecture of the peak of the bell tower, and the open interior features extensive detailing, along with seating for one thousand worshippers. Covered with sandstone from Berea, the building was a work of Gordon W. Lloyd, a Detroit architect who also produced grand churches in Ohio cities of various sizes, ranging from Trinity Episcopal Church in downtown Columbus to St. Paul's Episcopal Church in the smaller community of Medina.

== Status on National Register of Historic Places ==
In 1980, St. Paul's was listed on the National Register of Historic Places, qualifying because of its historically significant architecture. It is one of thirteen Lloyd-designed buildings, including ten churches, that are listed on the National Register.
