= Central, Cleveland =

Neighborhood of Cleveland, Ohio, United States

Coordinates: 41°30′N 81°40′W

Central
- Neighborhood of Cleveland
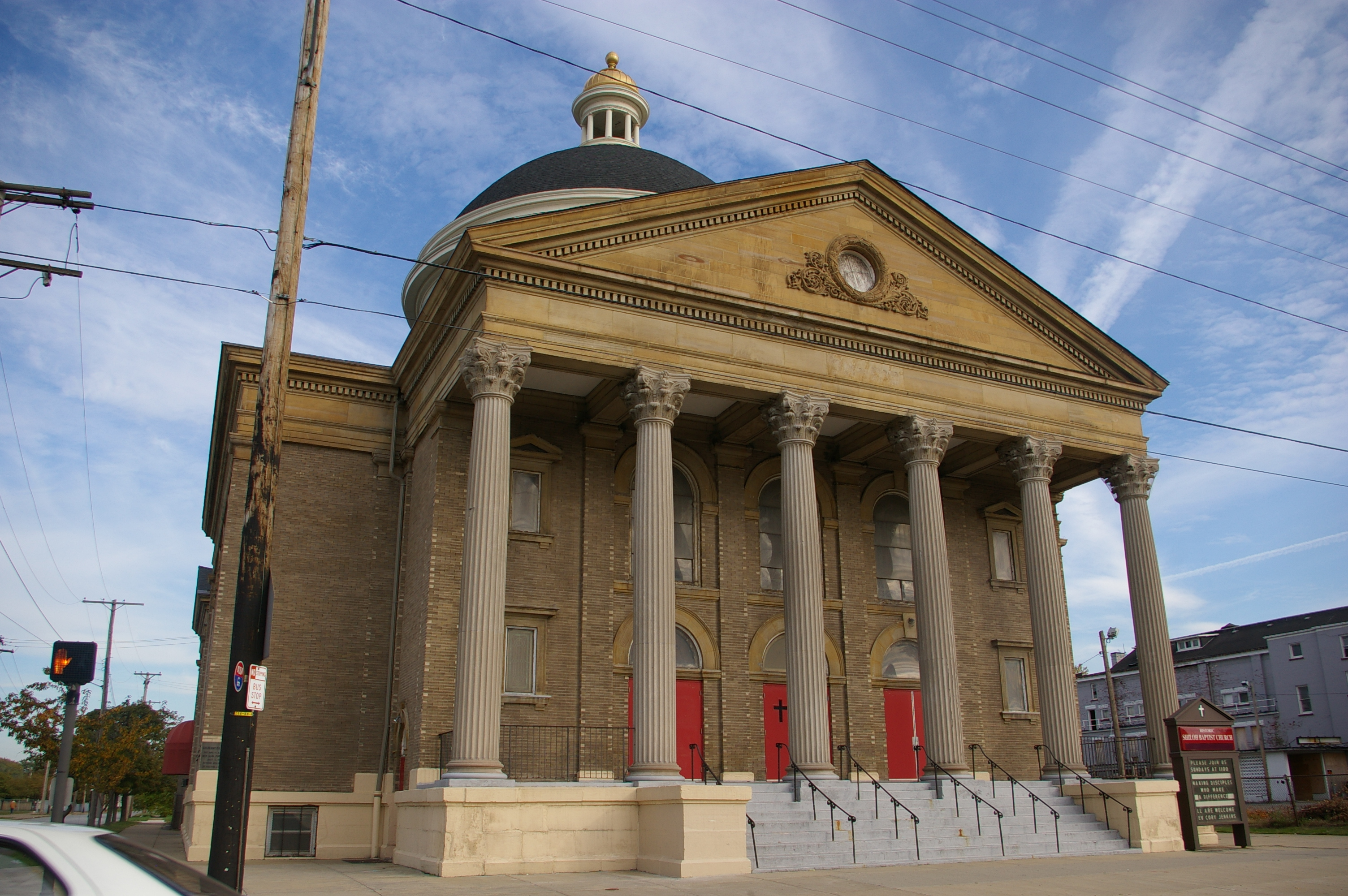
- Originally built as the Temple B'nai Jeshurun synagogue in 1905, Shiloh Baptist Church at E.55th and Scovill Avenue is one of several listings in the Central neighborhood on the National Register of Historic Places.

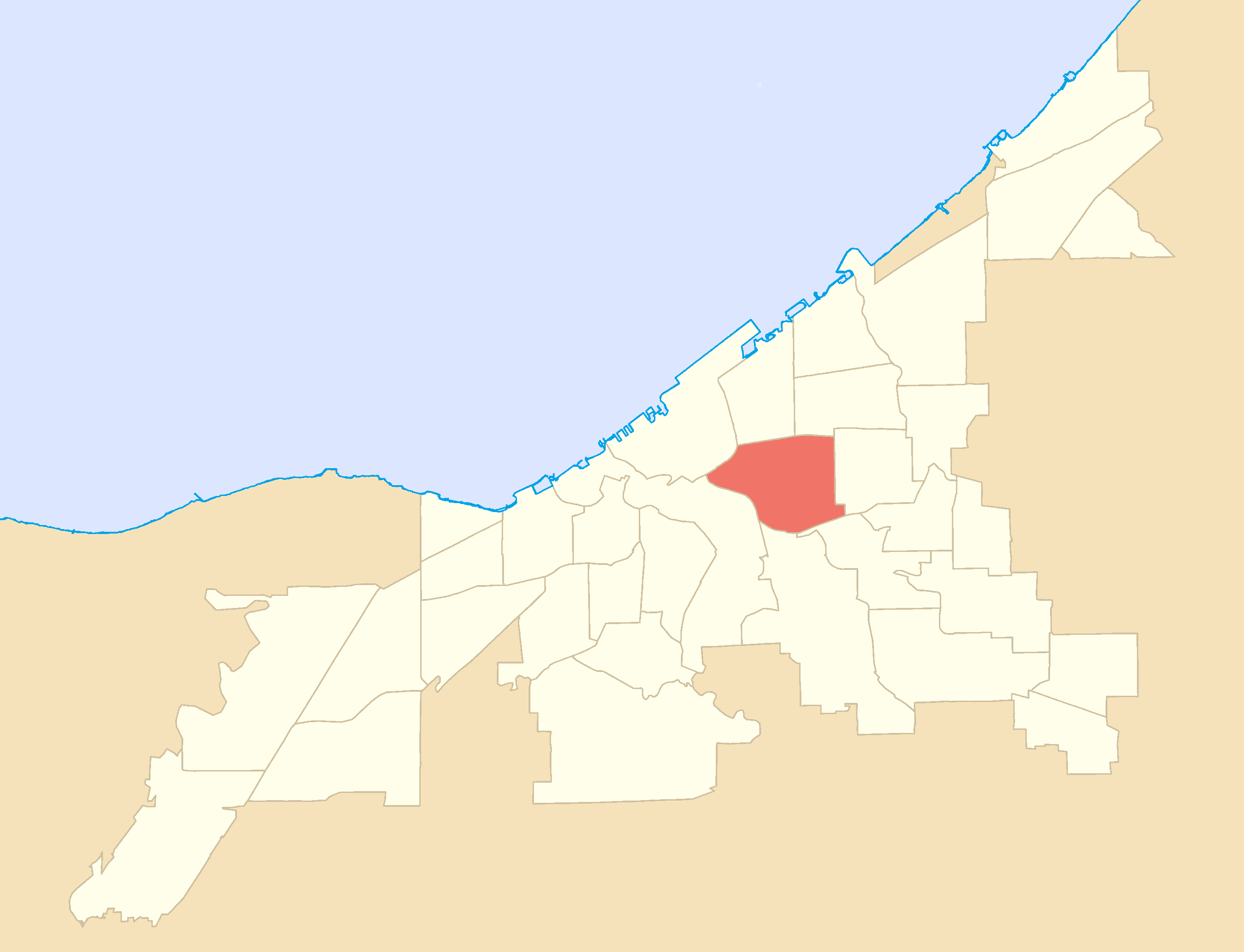
- Country: United States
- State: Ohio
- County: Cuyahoga County
- City: Cleveland

Population (2020)
  - Total: 11,689

Demographics
  - White: 8%
  - Black: 88.9%
  - Hispanic (of any race): 2.5%
  - Asian and Pacific Islander: 0.8%
  - Mixed and Other: 2.3%
- Time zone: UTC-5 (EST)
  - Summer (DST): UTC-4 (EDT)
- ZIP Codes: 44104, 44115
- Area code: 216
- Median income: $10,440
- Source: 2020 U.S. Census, City Planning Commission of Cleveland

Central, also known as Cedar–Central, is a neighborhood on the East Side of Cleveland, Ohio. Situated on the outskirts of downtown, Central is bounded roughly by East 71st Street on its east and Interstate 90 on its west, with Euclid Avenue on its north and Interstate 77 and the Penn Central Railroad to the south. The neighborhood is named after its onetime main thoroughfare, Central Avenue. It is home to several schools, including East Technical High School.

== History ==
Historical population
Year	Pop.	±%
1940	62,038	—
1950	69,665	+12.3%
1960	52,675	−24.4%
1970	27,280	−48.2%
1980	19,363	−29.0%
1990	13,788	−28.8%
2000	12,107	−12.2%
2010	12,378	+2.2%
2020	11,689	−5.6%

With its settlement beginning during the city's infancy in the early 19th century, Central is one of Cleveland's oldest neighborhoods. An influx of Germans in the 1830s marked the first in several waves of immigration to what would be gateway community for many ethnic groups in the Cleveland area. The neighborhood had large, working-class populations of Jews, Italians, and African Americans, as well as communities of Czechs, Hungarians, and Poles. The community was fairly integrated at the time, as observed by the poet Langston Hughes. By the beginning of World War I, the neighborhood's Jewish community gradually relocated further east mainly to the Glenville neighborhood. Due to the immigration restrictions of 1921 and 1924 enacted by Congress, very few new European immigrants arrived in Central and the population was replenished by a growing community of African Americans arriving from the rural South as part of the Great Migration. Between 1910 and 1920, the African American population of Cleveland increased from 8,448 to 34,451, the majority settling in Central.

With the onset of the Great Depression and the advent of the Public Works Administration (PWA), the State of Ohio preceded the federal body established in the National Housing Act of 1934 by creating the nation's first public housing administration in 1933: the Cleveland Metropolitan Housing Authority (CMHA). Central would become the location for Cleveland's largest concentration of public housing projects. In 1937, the PWA, working with the CMHA, built two segregated housing projects in a community that had previously not known segregation: the Outhwaite Homes (for African Americans), and the Cedar-Central projects (for whites). Reflecting a national trend in other major American cities at the time, the imposition of segregated housing in Central and the redlining of the neighborhood by the Home Owners' Loan Corporation became significant catalysts in its economic decline.

Until just after World War II, Central was a major retail center in Cleveland. Its population peaked at a post-war number exceeding 69,000. Although Central still retained a significant ethnic European population until 1960, its ethnic European communities, supported by benefits from the G.I. Bill, began to gradually move out to better neighborhoods and nearby suburbs. African Americans benefited less from the G.I. Bill, but many also left for better East Side neighborhoods. These developments, combined with the loss of manufacturing jobs in Cleveland, led to a further decline in population. Today, Central is a largely African American neighborhood with less than one-fifth of its 1950 population. Its poverty rate is 68.8%, the highest in the city. In recent decades, the neighborhood has emerged as a center for urban farming in Cleveland.

== Famous visitors ==
Soviet Russian futurist poet Vladimir Mayakovsky gave a poetry recitation and "proletarian culture lecture" in Central during his visit to Cleveland in 1925. The jazz orchestras of Don Redman and Fletcher Henderson also performed in the neighborhood, as did singer and civil rights activist Paul Robeson. Human rights activist Ione Biggs was born in Central in 1916.

== Famous residents ==
- Bill Cobbs - Movie and television actor
- Langston Hughes - Author and playwright, attended Central High School.
- Frank G. Jackson - 57th Mayor of Cleveland (2005–2021), currently lives in the Central neighborhood.
- Carl Stokes - 51st Mayor of Cleveland (1968–1971), first African American mayor of a major U.S. city, grew up at Outhwaite Homes.
- Louis Stokes - 15-Term US Congressman (1969–1999), brother of Carl, also grew up at Outhwaite Homes.

== See also ==
- List of African-American neighborhoods
- Andrew and James Dall Houses
