= Russell H. Davis =

American historian

Russell Howard Davis (October 29, 1897 – November 14, 1976) was an American historian, writer, teacher, and principal in Cleveland, Ohio. He helped create the Central Area Community Council.

== Family and education ==
He was born October 29, 1897, in Cleveland to Jacob Davis and Rosalie née Dite Davis were his parents, and his brother was Lawyer and Ohio state legislator Harry Edward Davis. His father was a post worker and his mother was French. Davis graduated from Central High School in 1916, Adelbert College in 1920 with a bachelor's degree, received a B.S. degree from the Case School of Applied Sciences in 1922, and received a master's degree in education from Western Reserve University in 1933. He married Claire Richardson in 1923 and they had a son Russell Lee in 1924 who died in 1933.

== Career ==
He started his career as a chemical engineer for Grasseli Chemical Co, before swapping to education teaching maths and science at Kennard Jr. High School. He then moved to Central High School in 1932, going on to obtain his master's degree in education in 1933. He was the principal of the first black junior high school in Cleveland.

In 1965 he retired from education after a career being the principal of three schools.

He wrote a book called Memorable Negroes in Cleveland's Past in 1969, and then in 1972 he wrote a history of the African community in Cleveland called Black Americans in Cleveland from George Peake to Carl B. Stokes, 1796-1969,

A few months before his death he testified in a case accusing the Cleveland school district of racial bias and promoting segregation. He said that although not official policy it had been the practice to place black educators in black schools.

== Death ==
He died November 14, 1976, and is buried at Lake View Cemetery.
