= Andrew and James Dall Houses =

- Andrew Dall Jr. and James Dall Houses
- U.S. National Register of Historic Places
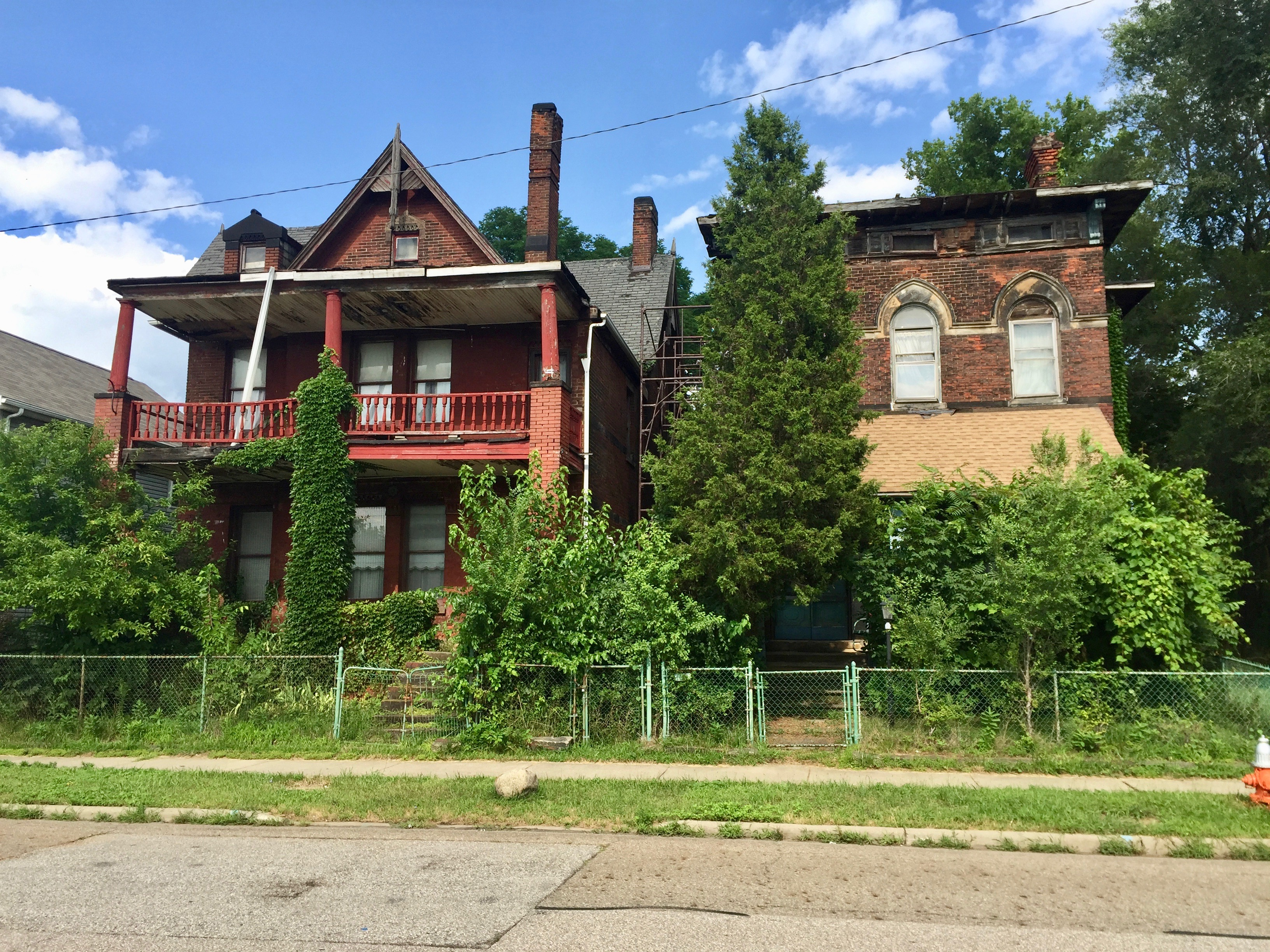
- Front of the houses (James' on the left and Andrew's on the right) in 2018, before their 2020 restoration

- Location within Cleveland Location within Ohio Location within the United States
- Location: 2225 and 2229 E. 46th St., Cleveland, Ohio
- Coordinates: 41°29′52.5″N 81°39′14″W
- Area: Less than 1 acre (0.40 ha)
- Built: 1875
- Architect: Andrew Dall Jr.
- Architectural style: Stick/Eastlake, Italianate
- NRHP reference No.: 84002913
- Added to NRHP: July 19, 1984

The Andrew and James Dall Houses are a pair of historic residences in the Central neighborhood of Cleveland, Ohio, United States. Erected in the late nineteenth century, they were home to two of the city's leading builders, and they have together been named a historic site.

A native of Scotland, Andrew Dall Sr. immigrated to the United States in 1852 with his family. Two of his sons, James (older) and Andrew Jr. (younger), established a prosperous construction business in Cleveland: they began as builders and contractors, and they later expanded into the role of craftsmen with their stonemasonry work. The brothers arranged for the construction of their homes in the 1870s: Andrew's house was started in 1875 and finished two years later, and the construction of James' house lasted from 1878 to 1881. During the time that the houses were under construction, the Dalls completed numerous prominent projects, including Adelbert Hall, St. Paul's Episcopal Church, and multiple mansions in the Millionaires' Row on Euclid Avenue.

Architecturally, the two houses are typical of high-style residences of the period. Located on adjacent lots, they are brick buildings with foundations of sandstone and miscellaneous stone elements. Andrew's house was built in the Italianate style, while James' house features elements of the Eastlake mode of the Queen Anne style. A cobblestone driveway for carriages is located beside the houses.

In 1984, the houses were listed together on the National Register of Historic Places. Unlike many other Register-listed Cleveland residences from the period, they did not qualify for inclusion because of their architecture: they gained this designation because of their place as the homes of some of the most prominent builders in the city's history.

In 2020, the houses were extensively rehabilitated through an effort undertaken by surviving members of the family, the Cleveland Restoration Society, and the Building and Housing Department of the City of Cleveland, with support from a Federal grant from the U.S. Department of the Interior.
