= Thaddeus Spratlen =

American economist (1930–2021)

Thaddeus H. Spratlen
- Born: 1930; Union City, Tennessee
- Died: May 18, 2021 (aged 90–91)

Academic background
- Education: Ohio State University, B.A./ B.S. (1956), MA (1957), PhD (1962)

Academic work
- Discipline: marketing management
- Institutions: Foster School of Business; University of California, Los Angeles; Western Washington University

Thaddeus H. Spratlen (1930 - May 18, 2021) was an American economist who was professor emeritus at the University of Washington's Foster School of Business. He was the first African American faculty member at Western Washington State College (now Western Washington University) and the Foster School of Business, and was among the founders of the National Economic Association.

== Education and early life ==
Born in 1930 in Union City, Tennessee, Spratlen was sent north to Cleveland, Ohio by his family for greater educational opportunities available to African-Americans there. He graduated from Central High School (Cleveland, Ohio) and began his college studies at Kent State University. However, economic constraints after the death of his father led him to enroll in the U.S. Army, where he served as an artillery officer in the Korean War. He used the educational benefits available to him as a veteran to continue his education, earning several degrees from the Ohio State University.

== Career ==
Spratlen was offered a position at Western Washington State College in 1962, when the head of the search committee removed the photos of the finalists from their application materials. After eight years at that university and three years teaching at the University of California, Los Angeles, he joined the University of Washington in 1972, and remained at that university for the remainder of his career. At the University of Washington, he was known for building relationships between the business school and local minority-owned businesses in Seattle, and for his mentorship of African American business students.

=== Selected works ===
- Spratlen, Thaddeus H. "Ghetto economic development: Content and character of the literature." The Review of Black Political Economy 1, no. 4 (1971): 43–71.
- Spratlen, Thaddeus H. "The Bakke decision: Implications for black educational and professional opportunities." The Journal of Negro Education 48, no. 4 (1979): 449–45
- Spratlen, Thaddeus H. "Targeting vulnerable segments in cigarette advertising: Ethical criteria and public policy implications." In Proceedings of the 1993 of Marketing Science (AMS) Annual Conference, pp. 446–450. Springer, Cham, 2015.
- Spratlen, Thaddeus H. "Affluent blacks as travelers and tourists: group characteristics and targeted advertising themes." In Tourism services marketing: advances in theory and practice. Special conference series, volume II, 1986, pp. 238–248. Academy of Marketing Science, University of Miami, 1986.
- Spratlen, Thaddeus H. "The record and rhetoric of black economic progress." The Review of Black Political Economy 4, no. 3 (1974): 1-30.
