= L. M. Gillespie =

American police officer

L.M. Gillespie
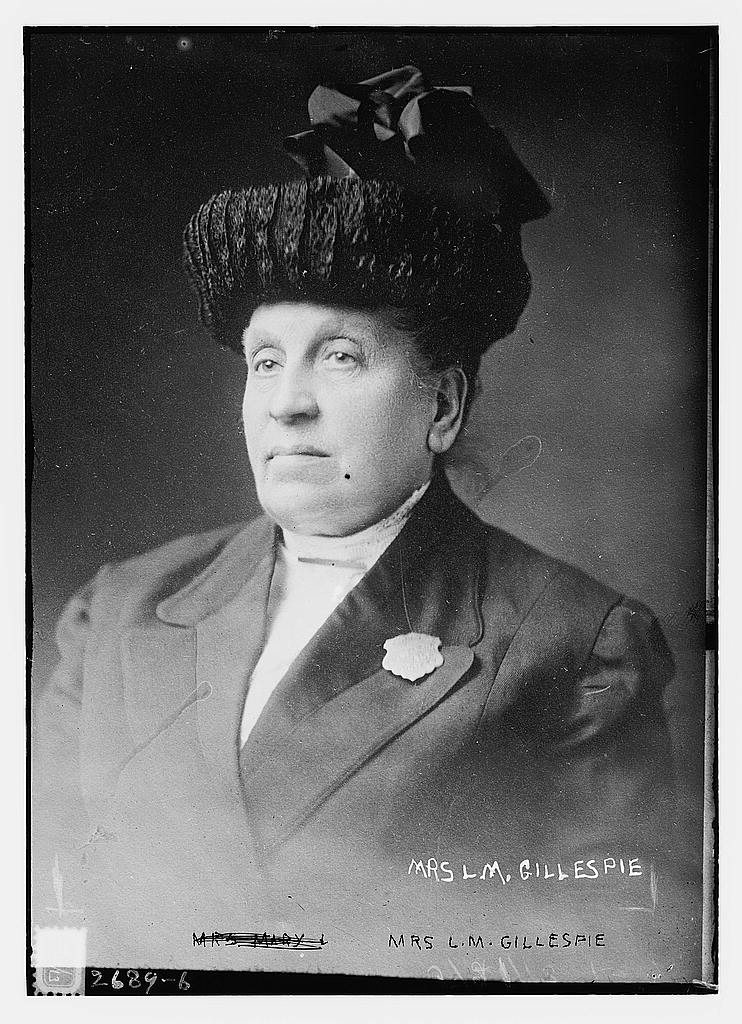
- L.M. Gillespie, c. 1913
- Known for: One of the first women police officers employed by the city of Philadelphia
- Police career
- Department: Philadelphia Police Department
- Service years: Early 1900s
- Status: Deceased
- Other work: Travelers' Aid Society agent; assisted police with human trafficking cases

L. M. Gillespie was one of the first women police officers to be employed by the city of Philadelphia, Pennsylvania.

She had previously partnered with Mary D. Diehl to rescue more than two thousand women and girls who had become victims of human trafficking.

== Biography ==
Prior to her recruitment by the city of Philadelphia, Gillespie and Mary Diehl had been working as agents of the Travelers' Aid Society, attempting to provide help to travelers in trouble. Multiple newspapers across the United States reported on their work, including the Oakland Tribune, which noted that the need to hire women police officers had "been felt for some time among the officials of Philadelphia, the work of the white slavers demanding some means of protection" for women and girls, and adding:

"For years they were members of one of the city's leading aid societies, and in the course of their experience have helped over two thousand girls and women find happiness in good homes."

Once employed by the Philadelphia Police Department, which had previously only hired women as police officers for department stores up until that time, Gillespie and Diehl were given even more authority, and were empowered to detain and arrest suspected criminals, marking the first time that women were assigned to what was considered to be more dangerous duty—patrolling inside of the two main railroad transit hubs, the Reading Terminal and Broad Street Station.

The two new policewomen were also given full authority to work throughout the city if needed, wore the same style of blue uniforms as male members of the Philadelphia police force, and were each provided with a revolver, black-jack, nippers (a form of single-wrist handcuff), and badge, all identical to the equipment provided to other members of the force.

Gillespie and Diehl reportedly worked "'split shifts' on their beats," and were "supposed to be 'on reserve' at their homes during the night."

Women police officers did not officially start patrolling the streets of Philadelphia until 1976.

== See also ==
- Women in policing in the United States
- History of contemporary slavery in the United States
- Travelers Aid International

== Gallery ==
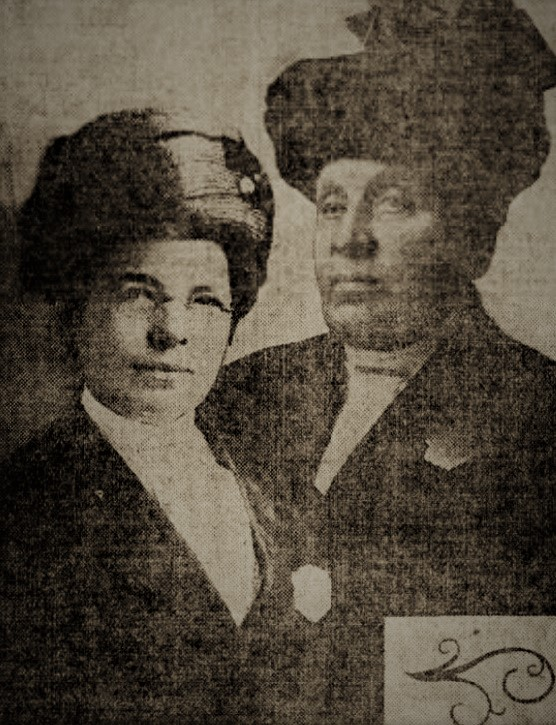
Diehl and Gillespie wearing their police badges, 1913
