= Mary D. Diehl =

American police officer

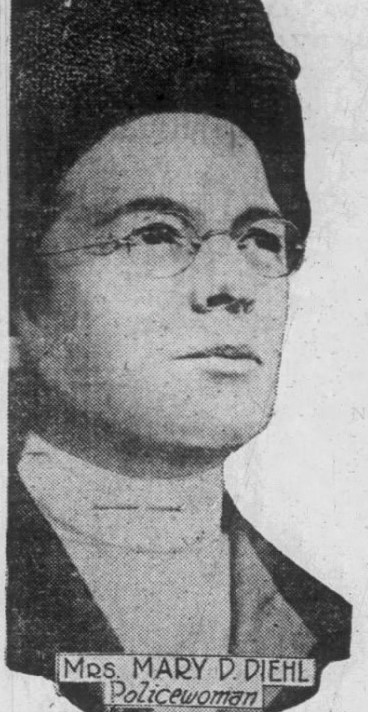
- Mary D. Diehl, 1913
- Known for: One of the first women police officers employed by the city of Philadelphia
- Police career
- Department: Philadelphia Police Department
- Service years: Early 1900s
- Status: Deceased
- Other work: Travelers' Aid Society agent; assisted police with human trafficking cases

Mary D. Diehl was one of the first female police officers to work in the city of Philadelphia, Pennsylvania.

She had previously collaborated with L. M. Gillespie to improve the quality of life for more than two thousand women and girls who had become human trafficking victims.

== Biography ==
Before their hiring as police officers by the city of Philadelphia, Diehl and L. M. Gillespie were employed as agents of the Travelers' Aid Society, on behalf of which they attempted to help distraught Philadelphia area visitors, including women and girls who had been kidnapped and held by "white slavers."

Subsequently employed by the city's police force, which had previously only ever recruited women police officers for department store work, Diehl and Gillespie were immediately given the authority to detain and arrest suspected criminals they encountered within Philadelphia's two major railroad hubs—the Reading Terminal and the Broad Street Station. It was the first time in the city's history that women were assigned to more patrols.

The two policewomen were equipped with the same tools given to all other city police officers, including badges, black-jacks, revolvers, and single-wrist handcuffs known as "nippers."

Diehl and Gillespie were assigned to "'split shifts' on their beats," and were then required to be “'on reserve' at their homes during the night."

== Legacy ==
It subsequently took more than a half a century after their hiring for Philadelphia to allow women to be awarded the most dangerous police work—walking the city's neighborhood street beats, a right that was granted in 1976.

== See also ==
- Women in policing in the United States
- History of contemporary slavery in the United States
- Travelers Aid International

== Gallery ==
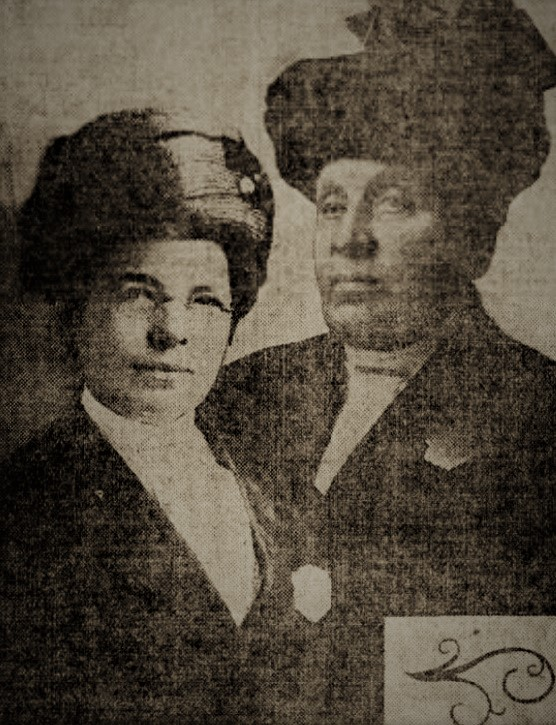
Diehl and Gillespie wearing their police badges, 1913
