= Ivo Puhonny =

German graphic artist and puppeteer

- Born: 19 July 1876; Baden-Baden
- Died: 6 February 1940 (aged 63); Stuttgart
- Occupations: Graphic artist, illustrator, puppeteer
- Known for: Sachplakat movement, puppet theaters

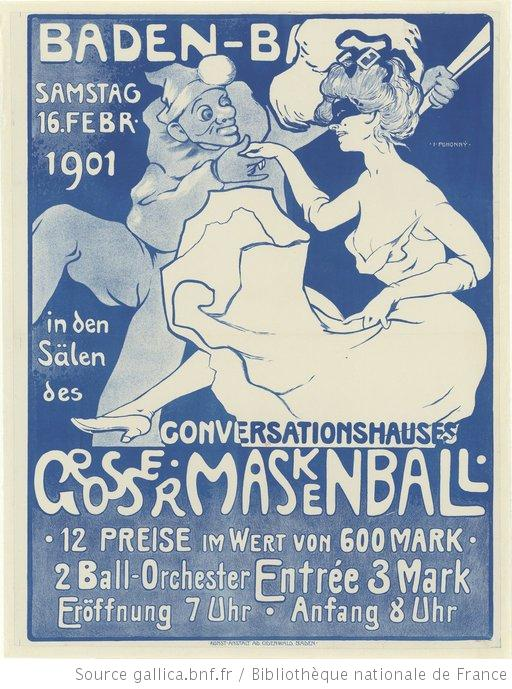
Advertisement poster for the Baden-Baden bal masqué, 1901

Ivo Puhonny (19 July 1876 – 6 February 1940) was a German graphic artist and puppeteer, son of the landscape painter Victor Puhonny. Puhonny is primarily known for his advertising art in the Sachplakat style, and for founding the Baden-Baden Puppet Theater in 1911.

== Life and work ==
=== Graphics ===
Puhonny studied at the Art Academy in Karlsruhe and was influenced by the work of Henri de Toulouse-Lautrec. Involved in the poster art movement of the early 20th century, Puhonny created advertisements for products such as margarine (for Schlinck & Co.) and cigarettes (Batschari). He also illustrated books and created etchings and lithographs. His graphics work is preserved in the Museum of Arts and Crafts in Hamburg and the Gallica Bibliothèque Numérique of the Bibliothèque nationale de France.

=== Puppetry ===
In 1911 he founded the Baden-Baden Künstler-Marionettentheater, dedicated to puppet performances. Puhonny and his wife carved and clothed the puppets and designed the stages for the plays. The theatre was based in Baden-Baden during the winter, and went on tour during the summers. Many of his puppet dolls are displayed in the collection of the Munich City Archives and the Staatliche Kunstsammlungen Dresden.

=== Personal life ===
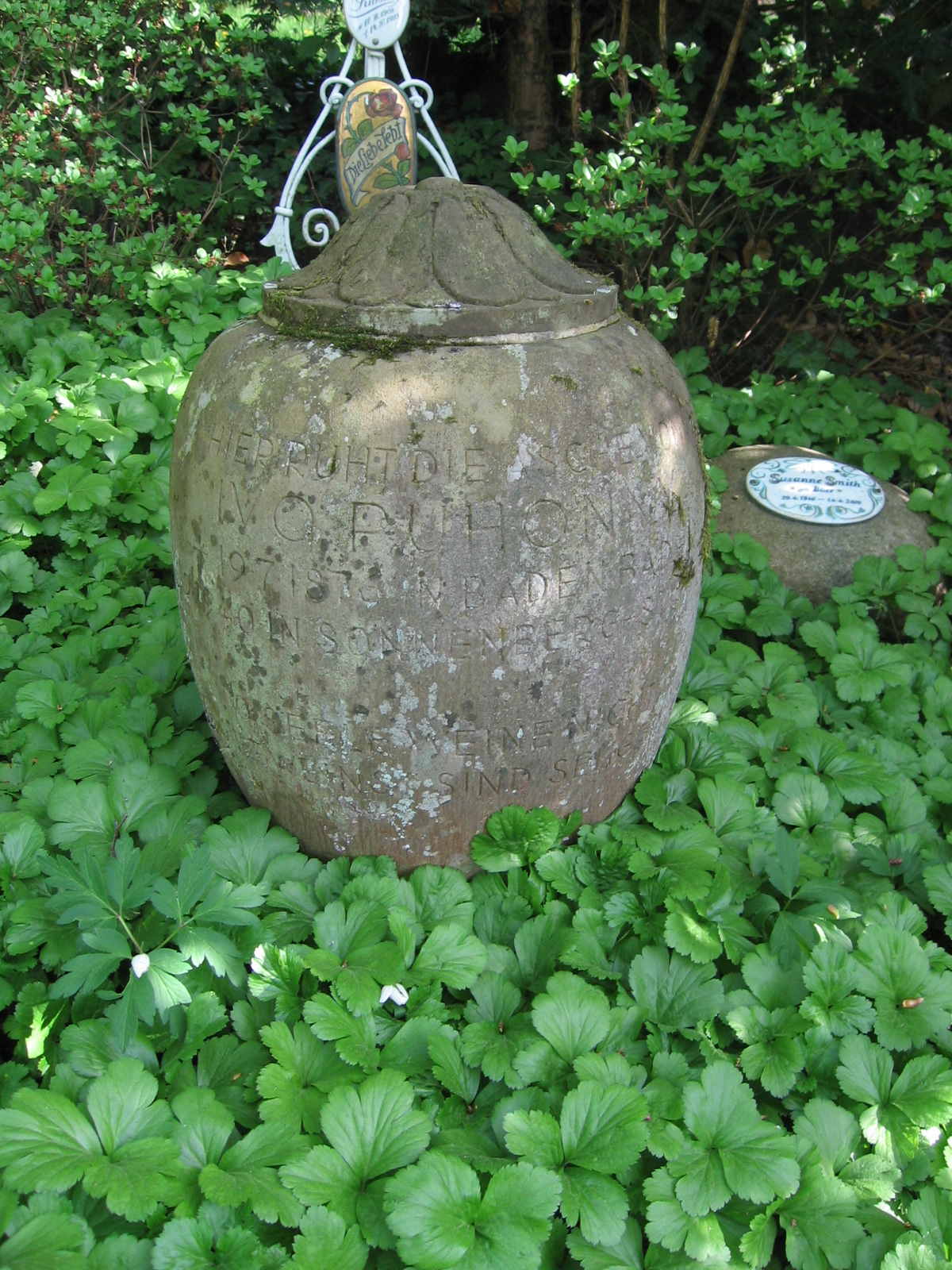
Ivo Puhonny's urn at the Baden-Baden cemetery

Puhonny married his school sweetheart Lisa, with whom he had two daughters, Eva and Doris. His home in Baden-Baden was a gathering place for important artists of the time, including Else Lasker-Schüler, Otto Flake, Klabund and Carl Sternheim. Puhonny was prone to depression because of his experiences during World War I, and the emergence of Nazism affected him due to his foreign-sounding name and the socially critical nature of his work, which became increasingly sidelined after World War II began. His circle of friends and acquaintances included Jews whose emigration, deportation and suicides exacerbated his depression. Suffering from a nervous disorder, he died at a sanatorium in Stuttgart following a stroke.

== Bibliography ==
- Ciarlo, David (2011). Advertising Empire: Race and Visual Culture in Imperial Germany. Vol. 171 of Harvard Historical Studies. Harvard University Press. ISBN 9780674050068.
- "Plays by marionettes prove popular in Germany". Popular Mechanics. 55 (3). Hearst Magazines. March 1931. ISSN 0032-4558.
- Catalogue of Copyright Entries: Books, Volume 7, Issue 2. orig. the University of Harvard. Library of Congress. Copyright Office. 1910.
- Sachs, Harvey; Manildi, Donald (1995). Rubinstein: A Life in Music. Grove Press. ISBN 9780802115799.
