= Harry Edward Davis =

American politician

Harry Edward Davis (December 26, 1882 – February 4, 1955) was a lawyer and state legislator in Ohio. He served both houses of the Ohio General Assembly.

He was born in Cleveland. He graduated from Western Reserve University Law School in 1908. He was first elected to represent Cuyahoga County in the Ohio House of Representatives in 1920 and served four terms. He was elected to the Ohio Senate in 1947 and re-elected in 1953. He married Louise Wormley in 1917.

He was a Freemason and published Freemasonry Among Negroes in America in 1946. Russell Howard Davis was his brother.

Harry E. Davis Jr. High School was named in his honor in 1962.

== See also ==
- List of African-American officeholders (1900–1959)
