= Josef Garbáty =

German businessman (1851–1939)

Josef Garbáty-Rosenthal (born 27 June 1851 in Lida, Vilna Governorate; died 29 June 1939 in Berlin-Pankow) was a German businessman in the tobacco industry.

== Family ==
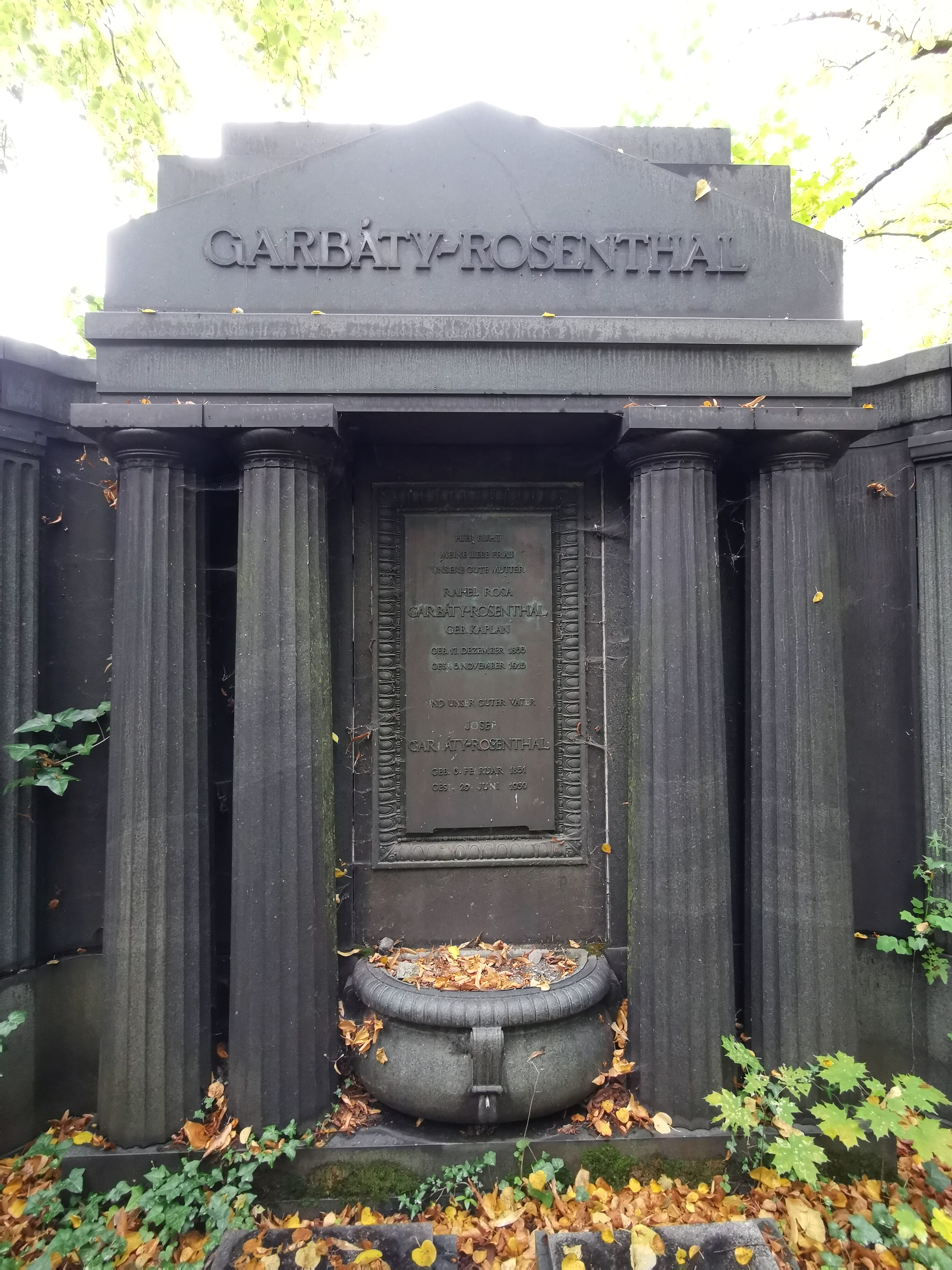
Grave at the Jewish Cemetery in Berlin-Weißensee

Josef Garbáty and his wife, Rosa Rahel (née Kaplan, 1855–1915), had two sons: Eugen Garbáty (1880–1970) and Moritz Garbáty (1892–1965). The family emigrated from the city of Lida, which had been part of the Russian Empire since 1795 and lay within the Pale of Settlement, to Prussia.

At the end of the 19th century, Garbáty opened his first cigarette factory on Schönhauser Allee in Berlin, producing the successful brand Königin von Saba (“Queen of Sheba”). In 1906, the factory moved to Hadlichstraße in Berlin-Pankow, where it operated until the late 1930s as one of the largest companies in Pankow.

== Nazi persecution and emigration ==
When Hitler came to power, the Garbáty family, of Jewish heritage, was persecuted and dispossessed under Nazi racial laws. In 1935, the GmbH was converted into a limited partnership under the name Zigarettenfabrik Garbáty KG, which was forcibly sold in 1938. As a result, the Garbáty family lost all of their Berlin property, totaling about 45,000 square meters.

The Garbáty family also sold their family-owned retreat, Altdöbern Castle in Lusatia, which had been in their possession since the early 1900s, to a noble family that was later expropriated after World War II in the Soviet occupation zone.

The Jewish Garbáty family emigrated to the United States in 1939, after their property was forcibly sold in 1938 to the Koerfer Group of Cologne and the Reemtsma Cigarette Factory of Hamburg, under the decree excluding Jews from German economic life.

Josef Garbáty, already elderly, did not leave Germany with his sons. He remained in the Garbáty Villa, cared for by Sophie Boroschek from the Rosenthaler Vorstadt neighborhood. Josef Garbáty died in 1939, two days after his 88th birthday. He was buried at the Jewish Cemetery in Berlin-Weißensee. The grave of Josef and Rosa Garbáty is located in section D4 — a large corner grave made of black granite in Art Nouveau style.

Sophie Boroschek was murdered in 1943 at the Natzweiler-Struthof concentration camp.

== Berlin cigarette empire ==
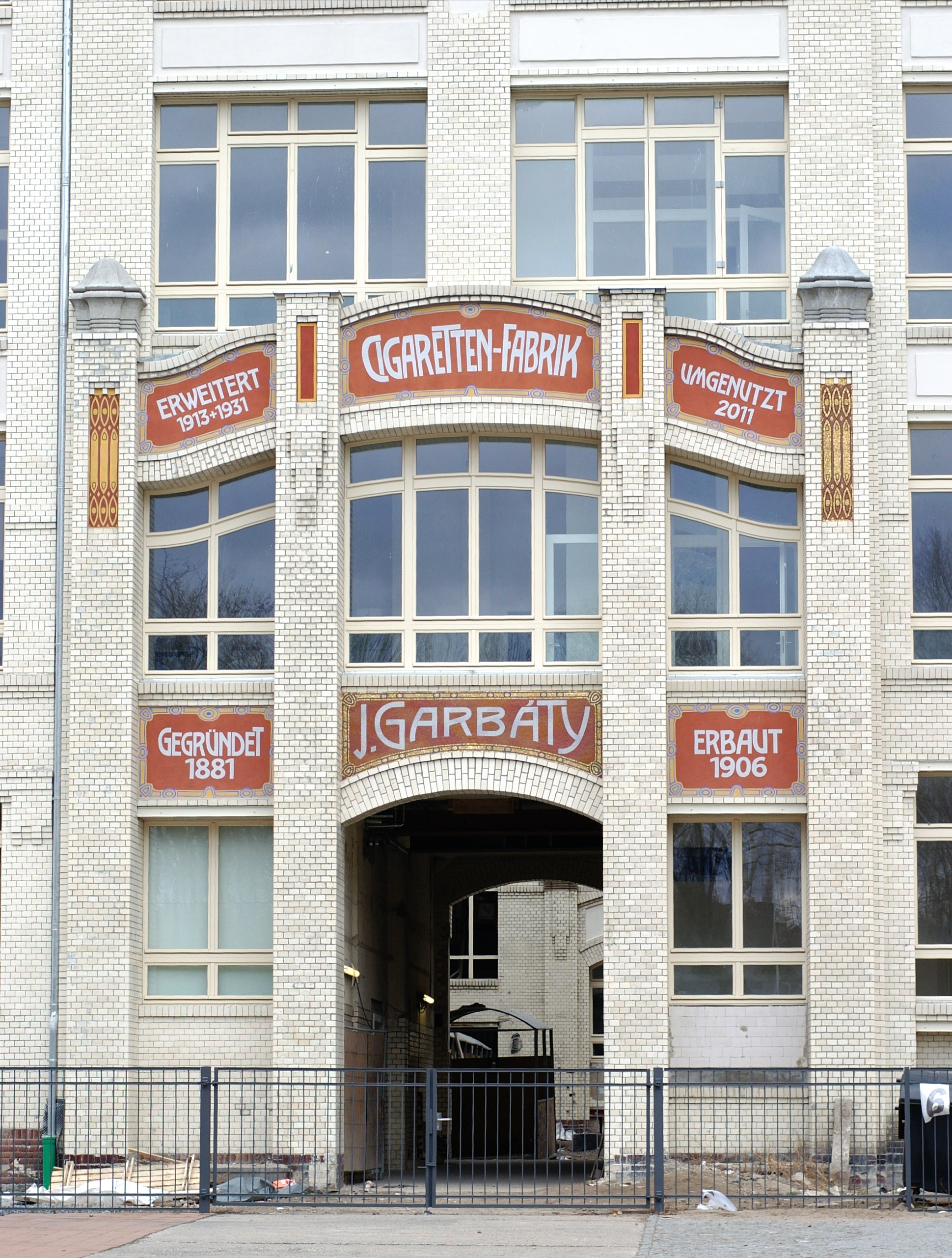
Portal of the cigarette factory in Pankow

As early as 1879, Josef Garbáty-Rosenthal and his wife began making cigarettes and tobacco products at home. In 1881, he founded his cigarette company on Schönhauser Allee, which he moved to Pankow in 1906. The factory buildings on Berliner Straße and Hadlichstraße, close to the Pankow S-Bahn station, were built according to plans by Paul Ueberholz.

From the start, the new cigarette factory included extensive social facilities such as a company cafeteria, break rooms, baths, a laundry, and a company library. A company newspaper was regularly published for the workers and employees at Garbáty, and there were also unemployment support, a factory choir, and a company sports club. In 1918, nine years before the introduction of state unemployment insurance, the company’s 1,000 employees were already covered by unemployment insurance. From 1908, breakfast and lunch were offered in the company cafeteria. The company also held regular balls for its employees well into the 1930s, such as the Alpenball and the Kirmesball, each February at the Deutscher Hof. Payments for meals in the company cafeteria were made with Garbátys (canteen money).

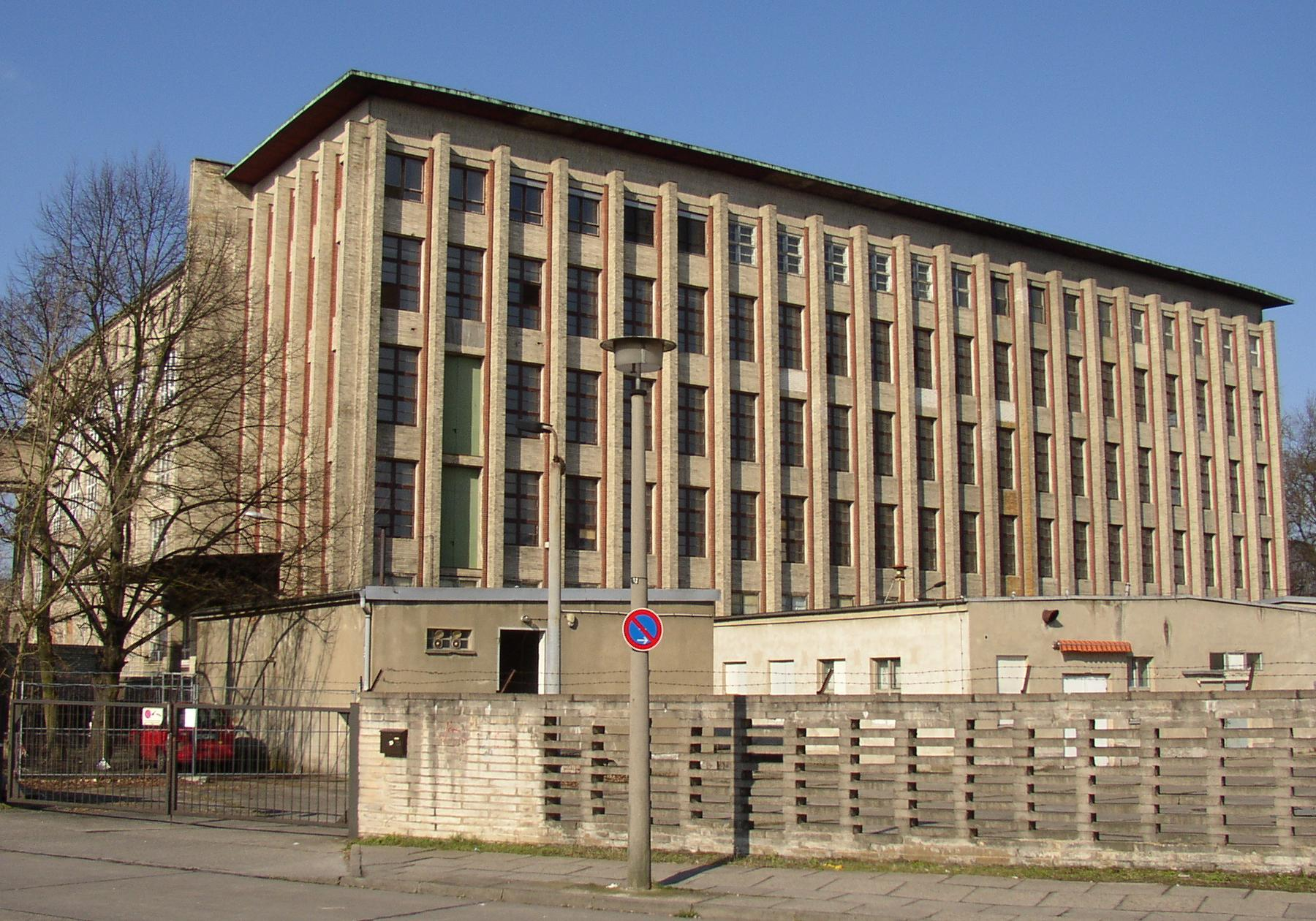
Cigarette factory in Pankow, third factory building designed by Fritz Höger

In 1912, a second building was constructed on the Pankow factory site. When the third factory building opened in 1931, Garbáty employed nearly 1,600 people, including a large number of women, who worked mainly in the banderole (cigarette labeling) hall.

Even before World War I, Garbáty had established branches in many European countries. Garbáty cigarettes were also sold in the German colonies of the time, as well as in America and Asia. In Russia, Garbáty cigarettes were popular under the name Garbáty Papirossi.

Garbáty became a purveyor to the ducal Saxon court and a supplier to the government of Italy. Its best-known cigarette brand was Königin von Saba, the first Egyptian-style cigarette produced in Berlin. The trademark was registered in 1887 and received patent protection in 1898. Cigarettes were delivered to merchants by Saba trucks. From 1928, the Kurmark brand was added, becoming another very successful product.

In the 1920s, cigarette cards—collectible cards included in cigarette packs—were very popular. Garbáty also produced collectible series on a wide range of topics, such as the series created in the 1930s:

- Deutsche Heimat – Eine Sammlung von Bildern, die von deutscher Geschichte und wirtschaftlicher Stärke des deutschen Volkes Zeugnis ablegen sollen mit 144 Abbildungen im Format 1.5" × 2.5"
- die international verbreitete Serie Gallery of Modern Beauty mit 300 Farbdruckabbildungen im Format 2 1/16" × 2 7/16"
- Schienenwunder – Ein wahres Märchen aus der Wunderwelt des Schienenstranges, von Luxuszügen, Schienenzepp’s und Torpedobussen
- Von Friedrich dem Großen bis Hindenburg – 255 ruhmreiche deutsche Wappen
- Sport-Wappen I Fußball mit 645 Bildern von Vereinswappen und weitere Sammelserien

For each cigarette card series, there was a matching album with pre-printed images, which could then be collected, traded, and pasted in. The albums were sent free of charge upon request.

The Garbáty cigarette empire handled the production of cigarette packaging in-house. On the industrial sites at Hadlichstraße 19/20, acquired in 1919 by Pa-Pa-Ge, a subsidiary of the Garbáty Cigarette Factory, modern machinery was used to produce packaging materials and posters for a wide range of clients. Cigarette packaging was only one of many products in their extensive range. Around 1927, the company employed approximately 800 people.

The sole shareholders of Pa-Pa-Ge were the brothers Eugen and Moritz Garbáty. In 1929, the company was sold to Reemtsma Cigarettenfabriken GmbH in Hamburg. From 1929, Josef Garbáty’s two sons took over the Garbáty Cigarette Factory, which was now called Garbáty Cigarettenfabrik GmbH. Reemtsma closed Pa-Pa-Ge in the early 1930s, and the buildings were later used by the Northeast Employment Office.

== Art collection ==
The family collected art from artists including Pierre Bonnard, Maurice Utrillo, Pablo Picasso, Henri Matisse,Raoul Dufy and many others. Many of these artworks are in museums such as the MFA Boston, the Metropolitan Museum of Art

== Philanthropy ==
Moritz Garbáty founded the Garbáty Sports Club (G.S.C.) and served as its chairman. The club’s colors were blue and yellow, and the cyclists wore jerseys with the Garbáty name. The Garbáty company also sponsored various sporting events, including races, cycling competitions, and football tournaments. In 1925, for example, the company donated the Garbáty Trophy for the International Long-Distance Cycling Race Zürich–Berlin, organized by the German Cyclists’ Federation. thumb|“De-Jewification” notice for the Garbáty property, 1933 thumb|Jewish orphanage on Berliner Straße Directly next to Garbáty’s cigarette factory was an orphanage for Jewish children at Berliner Straße 120/121. Garbáty supported it generously until it was forcibly evacuated by the Nazis and later used as a Pankow branch of the Reich Main Security Office.

== After World War II ==
The factory buildings survived World War II with relatively minor damage. The factory buildings, looted and burned on 1 May 1945, were put back into operation, even though the company still existed as a limited partnership despite the general expropriations.

At that time, cigarettes in the western sectors of Berlin were available on the black market, while in the Soviet occupation zone they were obtained with cigarette ration coupons

After the founding of the GDR, the cigarette factory was nationalized and renamed VEB Garbáty. One year before the Berlin Wall was built, the state-owned Garbáty and Josetti factories were merged into the Berlin Cigarette Factory (Bezifa), ending the Garbáty name in Pankow. Until reunification, the VEB Vereinigte Zigarettenfabriken, Werk Berlin, employed nearly 500 people, supplying DDR smokers from its modern Berliner Straße facility with cigarettes under the brands Club, Cabinet, and Karo.

During the GDR era, the Garbáty Villa (Berliner Straße 127) served as the residence of the Bulgarian ambassador. The building of the neighboring Jewish orphanage housed the Cuban embassy until reunification.

== After 1990 ==
A day before German reunification on 2 October 1990, the Treuhandanstalt sold the rights to the highly successful DDR cigarette brand Club—previously produced at the Berlin plant of VEB Vereinigte Zigarettenfabriken—at a bargain price to Reynolds Tobacco GmbH in Cologne. Since only the brand was sold, production in Pankow ceased on 3 October 1990. In 1991, the machinery and property were also sold.

In 1993, Lübecker Zigarettenfabrik GmbH attempted to resume production in Pankow, but the effort ended in bankruptcy in 1995, and the factory was permanently closed. After around 100 years, cigarette production in Pankow came to an end. Only the unused, listed buildings remained. By 2012, the factory building was converted into residential housing with over 160 units. The former tobacco warehouse behind the Jewish orphanage now houses a school, while the buildings at Hadlichstraße 19/20 are used as the commercial area Forum Pankow.

After several years of vacancy, in 1998 Wolfgang Seifert, operator of a Berlin temporary employment agency and treasurer of the far-right Hoffmann-von-Fallersleben Educational Foundation, acquired the Garbáty Villa and its grounds. This caused a media stir, as the new owner rented the property from 1999 for five years to the Pankow branch of the Republican Party. They vacated the villa in 2003, and it is now the residence of the Lebanese Embassy.

In 2001, the former Jewish orphanage building was reopened by the support association of the orphanage with a new usage concept and operated as a public library. It received donations from Josef Garbáty’s grandson, Thomas Garbáty. From 1999 to 2009, Café Garbáty operated at Breite Straße 43; it later moved to Mühlenstraße 30, keeping the name in memory of the Garbáty family.

The founder’s grandson, philologist Thomas J. Garbáty (born 10 January 1930 in Berlin; died 29 July 2009 in Ann Arbor), lived in the United States until his death. He remained a member of the board of trustees of the Association of Supporters and Friends of the Former Jewish Orphanage in Pankow (e.V.).

== Honors ==
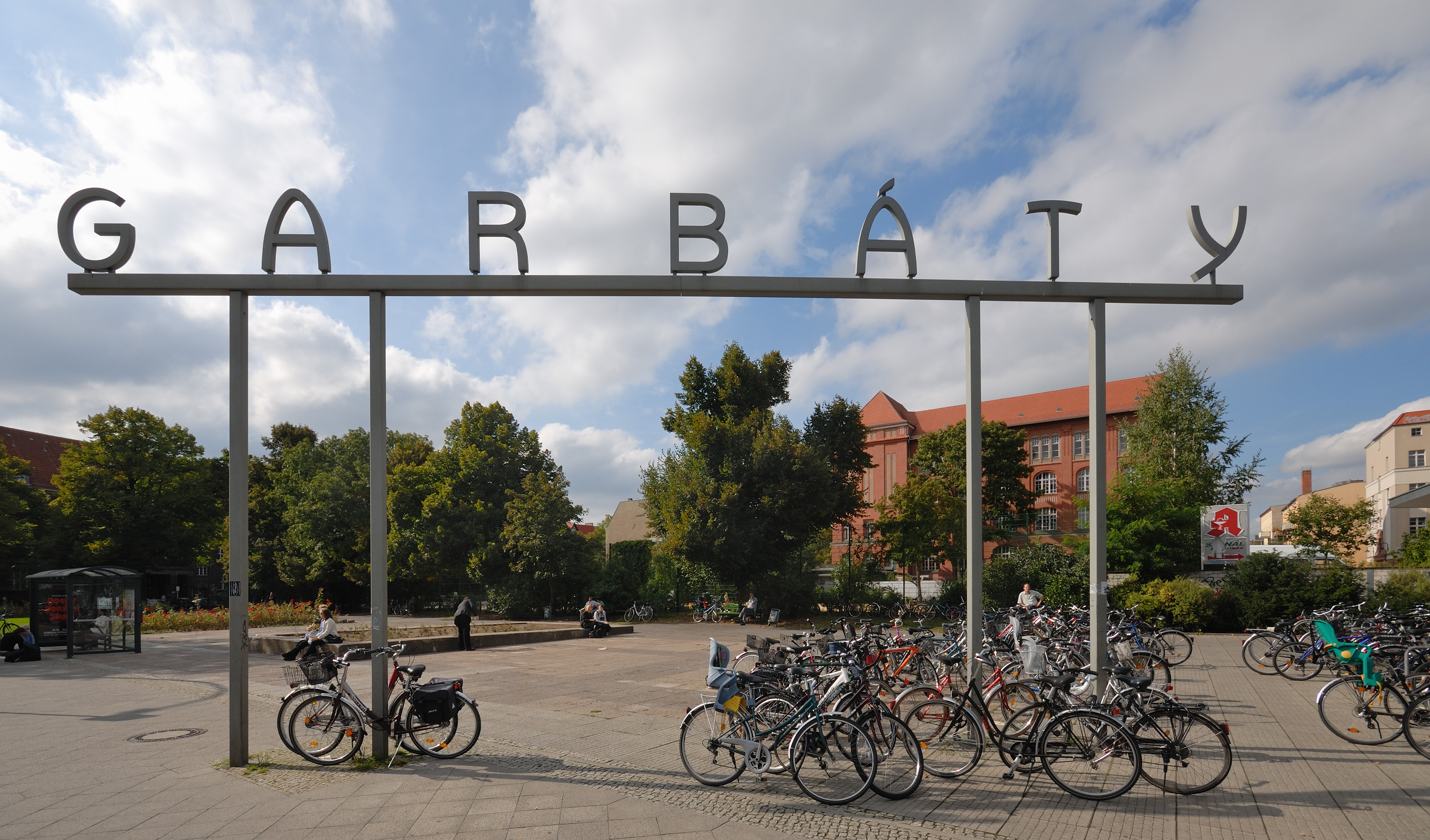
Garbáty-Schriftzug

In connection with the extension of U-Bahn line 2 from Vinetastraße station to Pankow S-Bahn station and the resulting redesign of the station square, the square was named “Garbátyplatz” on 16 September 2000, in honor of the Jewish cigarette manufacturer Josef Garbáty. The naming took place after the official ceremony for the opening of Pankow U-Bahn station.

On 29 June 2002 a sign reading “Garbáty,” designed by Berlin artist Susanne Ahner, was installed on Garbátyplatz to honor his social engagement beyond his work as an entrepreneur. In addition, a plaque was set into the ground highlighting Josef Garbáty’s social contributions.

== Literature ==
- Verein der Förderer und Freunde des ehemaligen Jüdischen Waisenhauses in Pankow e. V. (Hrsg.): Das Jüdische Waisenhaus in Pankow. Berlin 2001.
- Beater Meyer: „Arisiert“ und ausgeplündert. Die jüdische Fabrikantenfamilie Garbáty. In: Beate Meyer, Hermann Simon (Hrsg.): Juden in Berlin 1938–1945. (Begleitband zur gleichnamigen Ausstellung in der Stiftung Neue Synagoge Berlin – Centrum Judaicum von Mai bis August 2000) Berlin 2000, S. 77–87.
- Henning Köhler: Das Haus Koerfer. Eine Familiengeschichte im 20. Jahrhundert. Piper, München 2025, EAN 978-3-492-07265-6, S. 132–162, 336–376.

== Weblinks ==
- Garbáty-Zigarettenfabrik auf www.ansichtskarten-pankow.de
- Thomas Garbáty im Jüdischen Waisenhaus auf www.juedisches-waisenhaus-pankow.de
- Website des Café Garbáty in Berlin-Pankow
