= Women in policing in the United States =

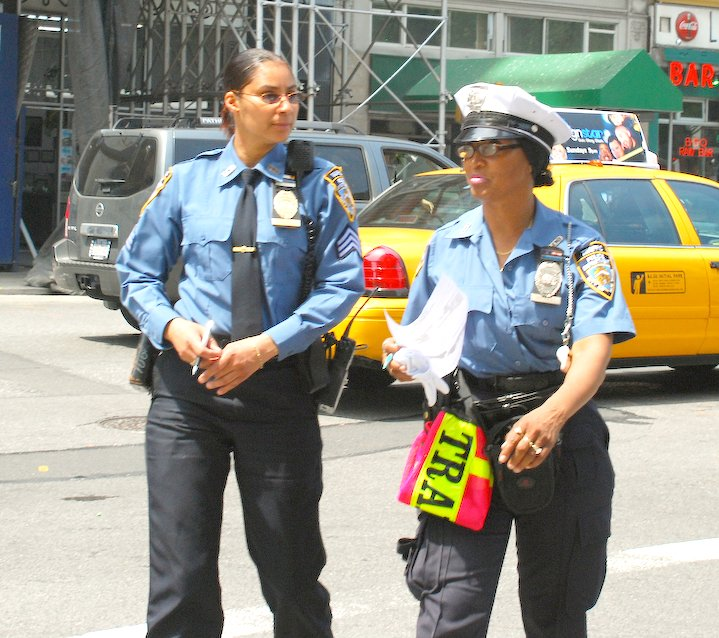
Two policewomen in New York City, circa 2008. Notice the old uniforms.

Women began working as police officers in the United States as early as the 1890s. Women made up 12.6% of all U.S. sworn police officers in 2018. Employed largely as prison matrons in the 19th century, women took on more and increasingly diverse roles in the latter half of the 20th century. They face a particular set of challenges given the history of their entry into the profession, their low rates of participation, and the complex identities they negotiate in the work place. Women who work in law enforcement have struggled for years to gain acceptance in their workplace. Some of their biggest challenges are their lack of representation, stereotypes around women, and intersectionality. Despite these challenges, women have proven to be more calm and use less force. Women go into situations more level-headed than males, and are able to deescalate situations better.

Organizations such as the National Association of Women Law Enforcement Executives (NAWLEE) offer mentoring services to women, guiding newly appointed head female officers to become better leaders.

== History ==
=== Early entry into the profession ===
Women entered the criminal justice professions in the early 1800s, employed primarily as prison matrons. Their primary responsibilities were to ensure the well-being of women and children in jails. Many women became involved in social and moral reform movements in the late 1880s and early 1900s, which facilitated their visibility in the sphere of policing and public vigilance. These moral reform movements concerned themselves with eliminating gambling, prostitution, public obscenity, alcoholism and other behaviors they considered vices. Marie Owens is believed to be the first professional police woman in the United States, joining the Chicago Police Department in 1891. Other early police officers include Alice Stebbins Wells, commissioned as an officer in 1910 in Los Angeles, and Lola Baldwin, an early policewoman working for the Portland Police Department on women's and children's issues. She officially began her work in 1908, but some draw distinctions between their arrest powers and the content of their work. The policewomen that followed Owens, Stebbins Wells, and Baldwin in the 1920s, 1930s, 1940s and onward fit a certain profile. They were often middle or upper class women who found their inspiration in moral reform and counseling movements. Indeed, these movements often served as advocates for including women in the policing profession as well as organizations such as the Federation of Women's Clubs, The League of Women Voters, and the National Women's Christian Temperance Union. Supporting the inclusion and growth of women in the police force aligned with the mission of these organizations, many of which sought to expand women's roles in civic and public life. 1915 saw the creation of the International Association of Policewomen, which worked to advocate for more opportunities for women in policing.

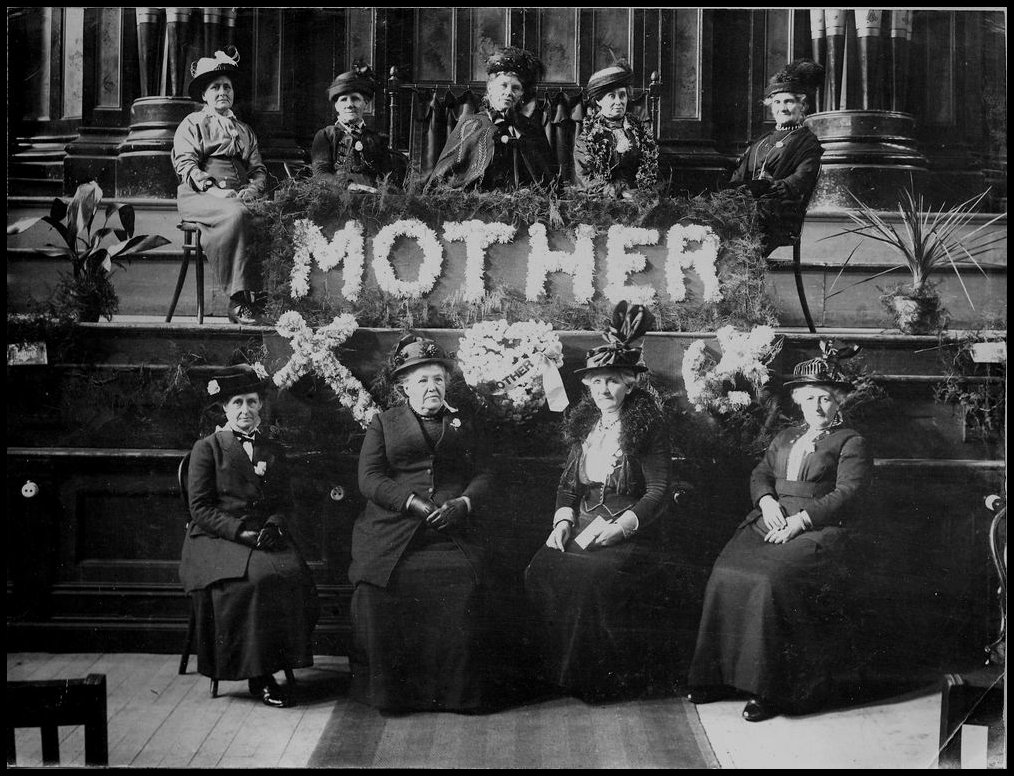
Meeting of a local chapter of the Women's Christian Temperance Union

The work of these early policewomen often involved desk work, supervision, and counseling of criminals. This counseling was geared mostly to vulnerable groups considered to be part of the purview of women's policing: prostitutes, runaways and wayward children among others. In accordance with the times, a 1933 Policewoman's Guidebook describes many of the routine details of a policewoman's work, which included: patrolling and questioning individuals such as lost children, "children in street trades," truants and runaways, unemployed and homeless women and girls, "sexual delinquents", women suffering from mental disorders, combatting the distribution of "salacious literature" and dealing with petty thieves and shoplifters. These tasks reflect the orientation towards moral reform that characterized women's roles in the policing profession in the late 1800s and early 1900s.

The first policewomen in the United States included Marie Owens, who joined the Chicago Police department in 1891; Lola Baldwin, who was sworn in by the city of Portland in 1908; Fanny Bixby, also sworn into office in 1908 by the city of Long Beach, California; and Alice Stebbins Wells who was initiated into the Los Angeles Police Department in 1910. Mary D. Diehl and L. M. Gillespie then became two of the first women sworn in by the city of Philadelphia in 1913. Their hiring was announced in newspapers across the United States.

The first African American policewomen to join the force include Cora Parchment, who was sworn into the New York Police Department, and Georgia Ann Robinson, who was sworn into the LAPD in 1919.

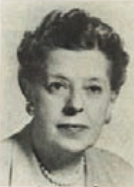
First female U.S. Secret Service special agent, Florence Bolan

The first unofficial U.S. Secret Service female special agent was Florence Bolan. She joined the service in 1917. In 1924, Bolan was promoted to operative (the title preceding special agent) where she performed duties, such as searching female prisoners and engage in occasional fieldwork.

As time continued onward, the organized movement towards including more women in the police force began to diminish, even as the raw numbers of female police officers continued to grow. With the decrease in structural supports, women's roles in policing stagnated. From the 1930s until the early 1960s, women's roles were largely working as dispatchers, checking parking meters, and continuing to deal with women's and children's issues (i.e. questioning female witnesses and offenders). They also took on more clerical and support duties, and were less involved in the active investigation of crime. During the early 1960s, women began to agitate for diversity in their participation in the police workforce, especially as working class women began to enter the profession- the role of policewoman as moral reformer, social worker, or secretary no longer aligned with the changing demographics of female officers.

=== 1960–1980: Tides of change ===
Women began to take more official, standardized, and widespread roles in law enforcement at all levels during the 1960s, 1970s, and 1980s, at the confluence of the second-wave feminist movement, national equal opportunity legislation, and changing economic structures. However, this progress often took place in police departments that still had policies that limited opportunities for women to take leadership roles and integrate fully into departmental work. Some of these changes came quickly, others more slowly over time. Firstly, the passage of the Civil Rights Act of 1964, specifically Title VII, made it more difficult for men to discriminate against women in hiring and employment, a trend which extended to the police force. This change was also paired with the development of a presidential commission on law enforcement that developed policy recommendations including synthesis and connection between different agencies as well as the hiring of more minorities and women. This marked a shift in the federal government's orientation towards law enforcement, focusing on state and local police departments. In continuance with these goals, the Johnson Administration passed the 1968 Omnibus Crime Control Act and the Safe Streets Act of 1968. The Crime Control Act created the Law Enforcement Assistance Administration (LEAA) that worked to expand programs on criminal justice/law enforcement at grantee universities, part of a push towards professionalization of the field. Soon after, a 1973 edition of the Crime Control Act was passed, mandating that any educational institution that received LEAA funds could not discriminate on the basis of gender, race, or any other protected categories, and so many educational opportunities for women were developed in the criminal justice field during this time. This was also paired with an increase in prison populations, creating new demand for law enforcement officers at all levels. Also notable in the elimination of gender-based discrimination in police hiring was the 1971 Supreme Court decision Griggs v. Duke Power Company. This mandated that job descriptions include only essential expectations, drawing upon a "disparate impact" model. This opened up the door for suits against police departments who had height, weight, and other physical requirements, which were framed as discriminatory against women.

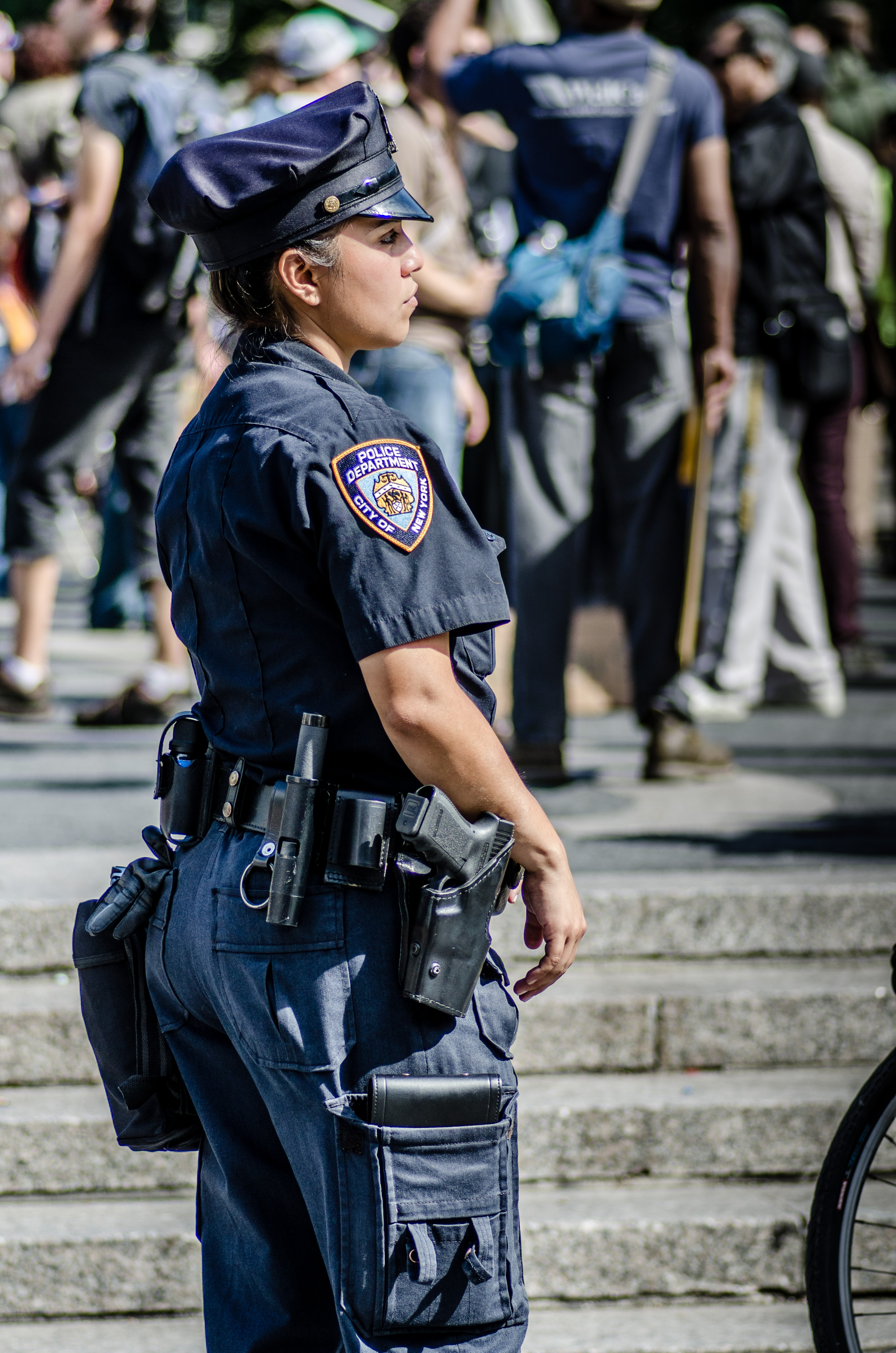
Female NYPD officer monitoring a crowd in Union Square

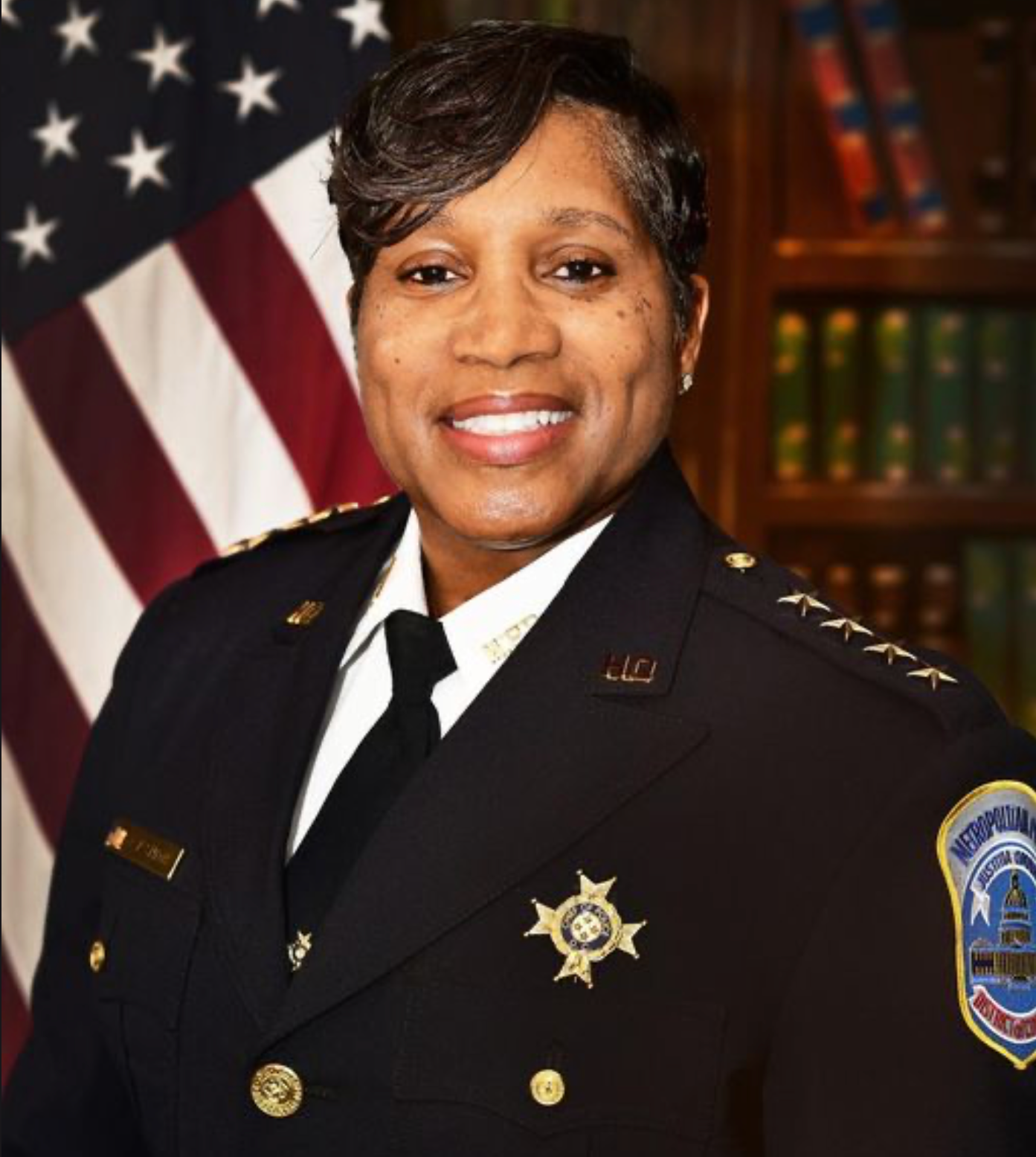
Pamela A. Smith, the first Black woman to be appointed chief of the United States Park Police and the Metropolitan Police Department of the District of Columbia

=== 1980 onward: The "brass" ceiling and role definition ===
Nearly 100,000 women are sworn police officers on the state, local, and national level. According to a study, women made up 5.0% of the police force in 1980. Data available from 1995 onward from the FBI's Uniform Crime Reports keeps records of numbers of female and male police officers at all levels: local, state, and national, with local police departments keeping records and then reporting to the FBI. In 1995, 9.8% of sworn police officers were women. This number grew in the next decade; in 2005 female police officers made up 11.2% of all sworn police officers. One decade later, the number of policewomen has grown little, from 11.2% in 2005 to 11.9% in 2014.

This stagnation reflects some of the discussion in qualitative studies about attracting and retaining female police officers and their perceptions of advancement opportunity in law enforcement. Cordner and Cordner's 2011 investigation of this stagnation effect examines the various rationales provided by female police officers and their male counterparts in southeastern Pennsylvania. They conclude that there is significant divergence between what male police chiefs see as barriers to increasing female recruitment and women's perceptions of these self same barriers. Specifically, they find that women employees describe the police agencies as having a culture that is "male dominated," that there is a lack of family-friendly work policies, and that police agencies do not actively recruit female officers. Male police chiefs thought that physical examination standards and extra hiring points given to veterans make it difficult to recruit and hire female police officers. In fact, survey data from 62 police agencies have found that physical examinations do serve as a significant deterrent to female employment- those agencies that do not have a physical ability test have more female officers than those that use these tests. This same study argues that in order to grow closer to reaching gender parity in policing, it might be useful to eliminate physical agility testing, or perhaps include this testing after all recruits have completed police academy. All of these issues characterize the difficulties in addressing stagnating rates of female employment in criminal justice occupations.

The types of jobs and roles within police departments are varied. These include "beat cops" patrolling around given neighborhoods, rotating patrol jobs, event and security details. Other positions include detectives, unit officers and supervisors, as well as administrative roles. These positions often come with more status, pay, and flexibility. Women hold, as of 2010, 7.3% of these upper level and supervisory roles. Studies have shown that some policewomen do not feel comfortable about seeking out promotions due to issues related to tokenism, (i.e. they did not want peers to assume their promotion was due to their being one of the few women in the department), or, relatedly, feeling like the promotional process was biased toward their male counterparts. Women also mentioned a concern for the impact of schedule change and less job flexibility would have on their families. These sentiments are tied to the concept of the "brass ceiling", a turn of phrase meant to describe the limited opportunities for advancement for women in the police force and military. Extremely specialized roles, such as SWAT team members, are perhaps exempt from some of the assumptions around tokenism given their rigorous qualifications for entry, but also present unique challenges for integration into the unit culture. A 2011 study argues that women in SWAT teams often need to "join the boys club" and may be relegated to specific roles, such as hostage negotiator, because of beliefs about female capacity for empathy and compassionate communication. This study also concludes that although tokenism is perhaps not an issue with regard to entry into SWAT team work, it remains salient with respect to promotion opportunities, mirroring women's opinions about promotion in other facets of the police force.

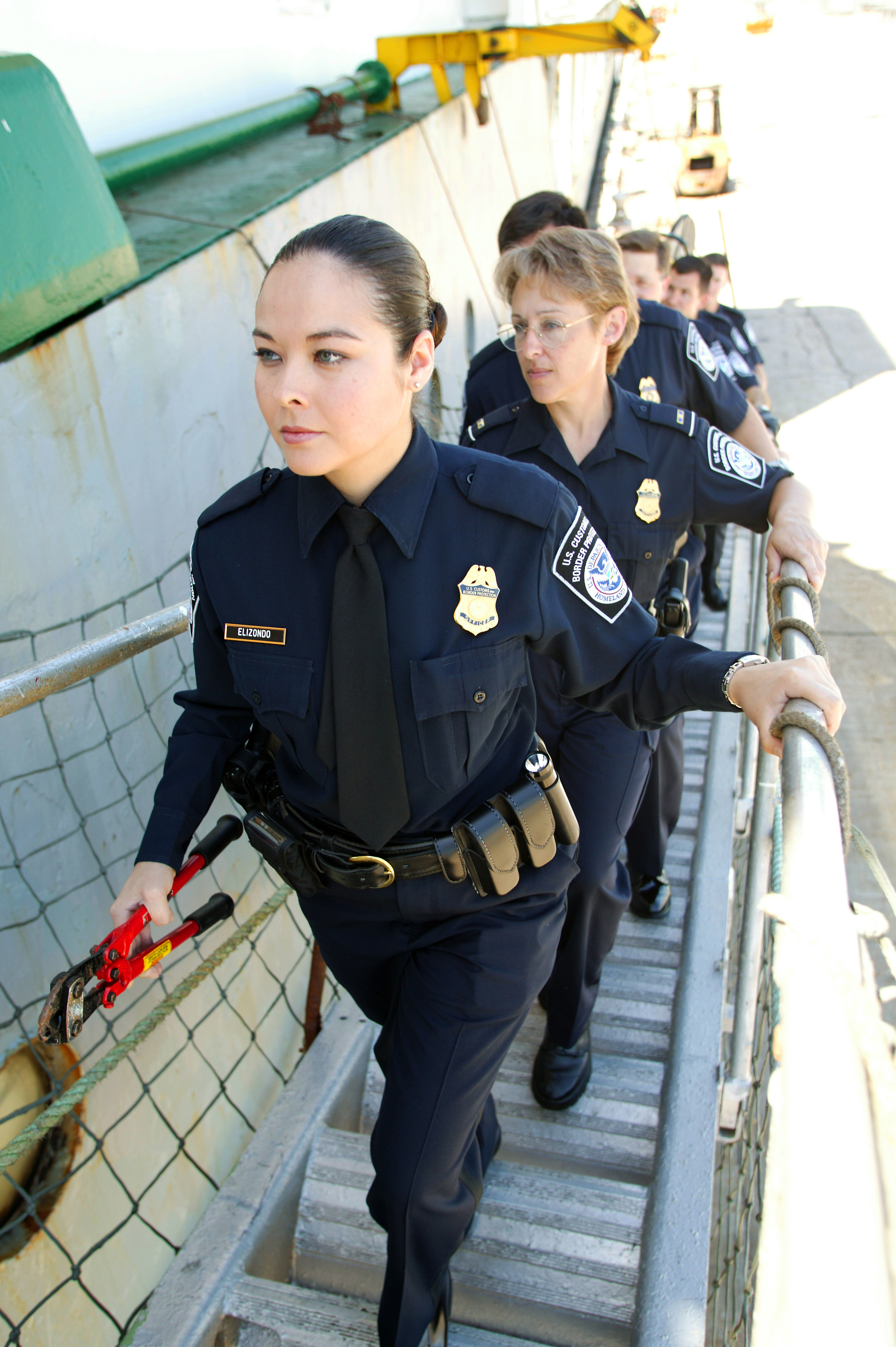
Female CBP officers going aboard a ship.

In 2021, Pamela A. Smith became the first Black woman to be appointed as chief of the United States Park Police. In 2023, she became the first to serve at the chief of the Metropolitan Police Department of the District of Columbia.

== Representation ==
In 2014, women made up 11.9% of police officers in the United States. The percentage has been stagnant for some years, compared to 11.2% in 2001. Until then, the number had slowly been increasing, from 9.8% in 1995 and 7.6% in 1987.

Several academic studies have discussed the topic of discrimination in hiring and management practices. A major reason for this is that recruiting processes favour candidates with high upper body strength and military experience. Between 2005 and 2011, pass rates on the physical tests were 80% lower among female candidates than male candidates. Women who are hired for police work are more likely to be given administrative or traffic jobs rather than to go out on regular patrol.

In an article for USA Today, Kevin Johnson also argued that women in law enforcement face a glass ceiling, as the percentage who hold the rank of sergeant or higher is far lower. Fear of getting unfair treatment from the male coworkers is a common reason for not trying to reach these higher positions. Since very few women receive guidance in overcoming these obstacles, the National Association of Women Law Enforcement Executives (NAWLEE) has been involved since 1995 to guide women into having executive positions and help guide new female officers to reach up to achieving these leadership roles.

Women are better represented in larger police departments than smaller ones. In 2008, these percentage stood at:

- Large local police departments: 15%
- Large sheriffs offices: 13%
- Medium-sized local police departments: 8%
- Medium-sized sheriffs offices: 8%
- Small local police departments: 6%
- Small sheriffs offices: 4%

Large city departments have some of the highest percentages of female officers. This includes the New York Police Department (18% of uniformed officers in 2017) the Los Angeles Police Department (18% in 2018) and the Chicago Police Department (24% in 2010).

Women are overall better represented, but still underrepresented, in federal law enforcement agencies. In 2008, the percentage of women in federal agencies was:

- Office of Inspector General: 25%
- United States Postal Inspection Service: 22%
- Federal Bureau of Investigation: 19%
- United States Capitol Police: 19%
- United States Forest Service: 15.9%
- Federal Bureau of Prisons: 14%
- Bureau of Alcohol, Tobacco and Firearms: 13%
- Drug Enforcement Administration: 10%

In a 2012 survey of the 41 largest agencies, women made up 14.6% of the total number of officers, but only 0.47% of SWAT team members.

=== Highest ranked women police ===
While there are female police chiefs in small counties, the Chicago Police Department, the second largest in the US, has yet to appoint a female chief. The NYPD appointed Juanita N. Holmes the Chief of Patrol Bureau in 2020, one of twenty bureaus in the NYPD, the NYPD also has appointed a female Commissioner. The Chicago Police Department appointed Barbara West the Deputy Superintendent in 2020, the third highest rank of the department.

== Popular perceptions ==
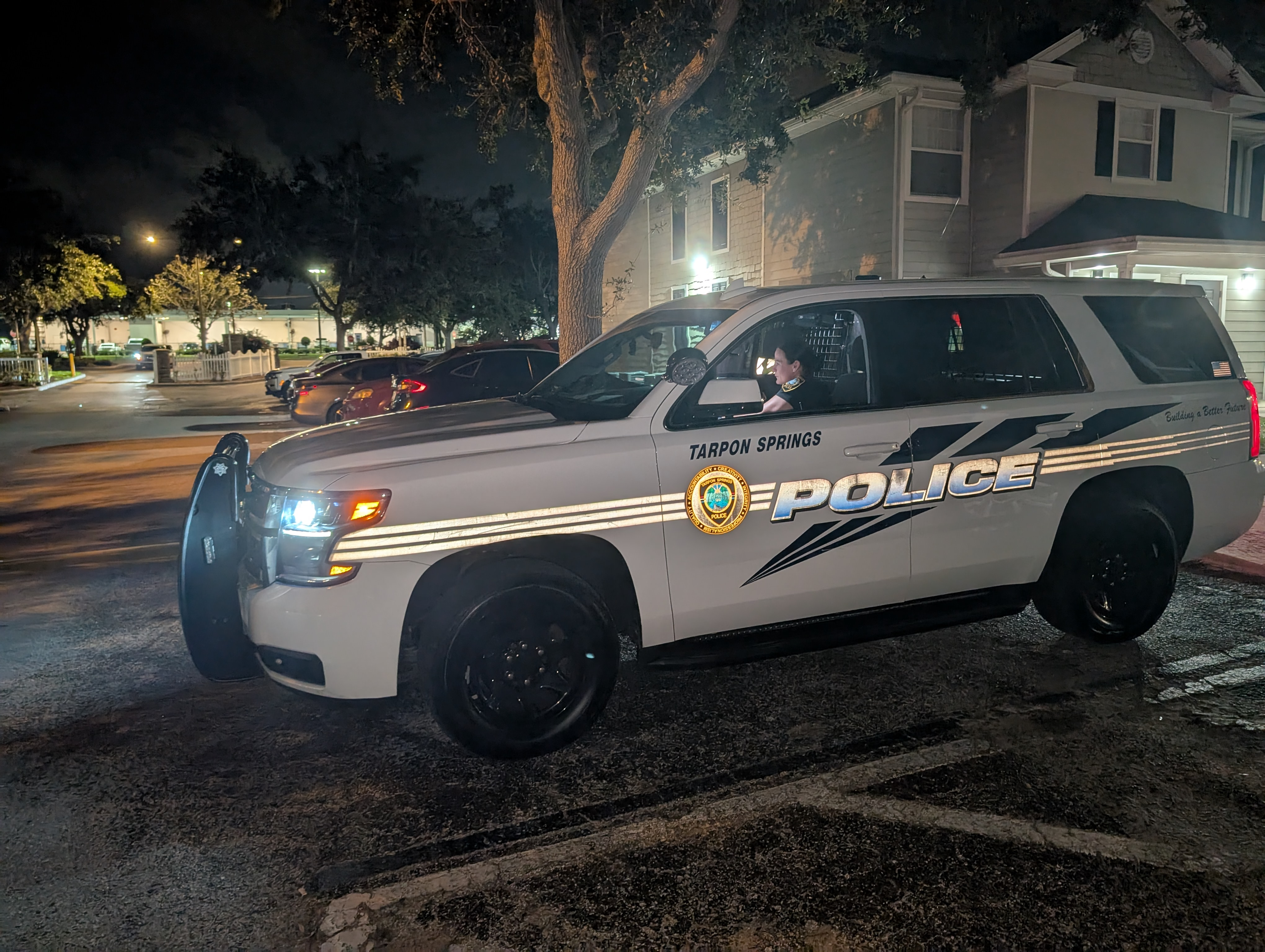
Tarpon Springs Police Officer Rachel Rodriguez inside her Patrol SUV

The media has an important role to play in shaping perceptions and representations of female police officers. Shows such as Law & Order, Rizzoli & Isles, The Closer and Law & Order: Special Victims Unit all portray female police officers in multifaceted lights, reflecting the many roles they take in police departments and federal law enforcement. There are many more examples of these portrayals, and the above list is not meant to be representative. For a listing of female characters involved in law enforcement both in television, movies, and books, see [list of female detective characters]. There is a preponderance of female detectives in popular television representations, who historically have been highly sexualized, particularly in the late 1960s and 1970s in shows such as The Bionic Woman, Charlie's Angels and Police Woman. Characters in these shows and others in this time period often featured female detectives who had male bosses, rarely physically engaged or attacked adversaries, and were not involved in planning large missions, simply executing them.

This image of the female detective is less prevalent in television programs of the 1990s and 2000s but serves as a historical frame. For example, TLC's Police Women series (2009-2014) which follows female officers in departments around the United States in a documentary-style program relies less on old tropes, providing snippets of real women on the job. However, women may face these generalizations in their day to day experience of being a part of the police force. Other stereotypes also can serve as theoretical and historical backdrop to media representations of female police officers. Kanter, in a 1977 study of female employees in corporate settings developed a list of four stereotyped roles that "token" females can face in male-dominated workplaces. These include the mother- a woman who appears to be kind and sympathetic, the pet- a "cheerleader" of sorts who is lacking intellectual prowess, the seductress-an object of sexual desire and source of office drama, and the iron maiden-a tough or direct woman who doesn't seem to fit the rest of the categories. Given that the gender distribution of the police force is highly male, these role generalizations are salient perhaps not only in the lived employment experience of female police officers, but also in their media presentations.

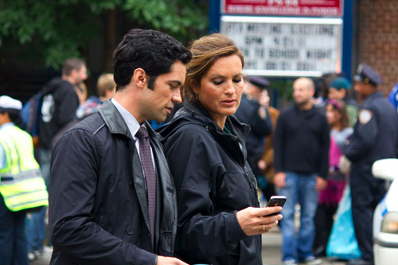
Detective Olivia Benson and Detective Nick Amaro characters in Law & Order: Special Victims Unit

Indeed, Evans and Davies studied the visibility of female police officers in prime time TV shows, analyzing 46 shows from various networks and comparing this to local and state data about women in police departments. They found that women and minority police officers were "over-represented", meaning their rates of representation on these TV shows is much higher than their rates of representation in the actual police force, according to data from the Bureau of Justice Statistics. This diversity of representation is less evident in feature films, particularly police action films. Neal King argues that women in these films are often represented as rookies, unsure of their professional selves or otherwise as undercover detective cops. He notes that women are often involved in detection as opposed to violent, physical action and some of this detection is directed toward intimates (i.e. friends, family, and lovers). This lack of representation extends to media geared towards police officers. A 2011 study found that, in an analysis of magazines for the police community, women were not represented in equal measure to their rates of employment in the police force, and that when these women were represented, it was often in "decorative" roles, and almost always in a photo with men.

These limited representations are not limited to within the policing profession, but rather reflect a broader trend of narrow media images of women in general. A 1992 study analyzed 116 episodes of prime time television, and though they found specifically that twice as many men as women were represented in law enforcement, courts and other realms of public administration, they also found similar discrepancies in other industries. They also noted that women were more likely to be displayed in jobs that fall lower on an organizational hierarchy.

== Perspectives from within the profession ==
Historically, men in the policing profession have adhered to their roles as law enforcers, demonstrated through physical skill. The gendered logic suggesting that women are unfit to be police officers because of their lack of physical strength has led to a male perspective on female police officers as "outsiders." As one scholar puts it, "women who do breach the boundary to penetrate this masculine world can only ever be partially successful and will often have to subsume "male characteristics" to achieve even a limited social acceptability." Some studies of male officers' perspectives on their female colleagues cite their belief that it is uneconomical to train women as police officers. Beyond the view that women are physically unfit to be police officers, some men may resent the presence of female police officers because they represent the more "feminine" aspects of police work (such as social work and paper work) that they would like to conceal behind the more heroic and aggressive aspects of policing.

=== Female perspectives on policing ===
One of the most prevalent debates in the feminist research is whether or not women bring different attitudes to police work. That is, do women approach their job as a police officer differently because of their identity as a woman? Studies have provided mixed evidence on this question.

In general, both male and female police officers view arrests as a measure of success in their roles as police officers and force as an indicator of performance. However, there are observed differences between how women approach their job - namely, their tendency to value autonomy less in the streets and to use physical force and violence less during confrontations. Furthermore, women tend to be more responsive to victims, especially in cases of domestic dispute.

Those who claim that women bring a different perspective to policing draw on Carol Gilligan's theory of gendered moral development. Gilligan distinguishes between two forms of morality: a morality of justice and a morality of care. The former she defines in terms of rules and rights; right and wrong are determined by whether or not they adhere to universal moral laws. Gilligan argues that men more often subscribe to this morality of justice. In contrast, women tend to subscribe to a morality of care, which is defined in terms of interpersonal relationships. According to this morality, what is right and wrong depends on what contributes most to a nurturing and protective relationship. Women may view their policing role as one that is intimately connected with service to a community, while men view their role as one primarily concerned with law enforcement. This may explain why women are more likely to be responsive to victims and take on the more emotional and social aspects of police work. However, this view is complicated by evidence showing that women in policing tend to prefer work spaces with more uniform rules and regulations. Furthermore, some studies have shown that women and men's attitudes towards policing tend to converge over time. What is less clear is whether women adopt masculine attitudes towards policing or vice versa.

Martin (1980) has been cited throughout the literature on this topic with her distinction between a POLICEwoman and a policeWOMAN. While the latter permits her sexual identity to influence her own and others' perceptions of her role and performance as a police officer, the former actively strives to minimize the influence of her sexual identity. For example, a policeWOMAN may embrace her role as a more compassionate, relationship-oriented officer, while a POLICEwoman may reject these roles and use male hostility as a motivation to fill roles not normally associated with female officers. Taking on these roles have both their advantages and disadvantages. While the policeWOMAN may be perceived as weak and incompetent, the POLICEwoman may be disparaged for rejecting their femininity and adopting "butch" characteristics.

A recent study by Amie Schuck (2014) has shown that in general, women are less likely to assimilate hypermasculine beliefs into their identities. Women are more likely to engage in what Schuck refers to as emotional labor, the "management of feelings in an effort to invoke a specific state of mind in another person." This kind of work might include interacting more empathetically towards citizens, which may explain Schuck's findings that women police officers are less likely to be subject to negative reports and complaints from citizens. However, Schuck cautions against reading too much into these findings, worrying that focusing on differences in how women and men view policing is a "slippery slope that will result in essentialist thinking and prejudicial and discriminatory practices," such as relegating women solely to policing jobs that require more emotional labor. Yet she believes that acknowledging these differing perspectives remains important, especially when this acknowledgement might lead to police reform, such as more community-based and empathetic policing.

Despite the difference in experiences and perspectives that women may bring to policing, women have been shown to be just as capable as men in fulfilling their duties as police officers. Furthermore, studies have revealed that rather than shying away from the profession, women report higher job satisfaction than men in policing, suggesting that gender on its own does not negatively influence the participation of women in policing. Dantzker and Kubin (1998) attribute this finding to the possibility that women find fulfillment in policing through more intrinsic rewards than objective factors - such as pay - which is more often perceived as a measure of success by men.

== Intersectionality in female policing ==
Identities beyond gender can influence the experiences of female police officers. These identities include race and sexual orientation. Just as women have been excluded from the traditionally masculine profession of policing, so have minority races been excluded from policing as a traditionally white profession. The intersections of race, gender, and sexual orientation create a particularly complicated space for women of color and/or non-heterosexual identities.

== Theoretical aspects in female officers ==
In the twenty first century there are more and more female police officers. However, it is still extremely difficult for them. They have to constantly prove themselves over and over, and they are not taken seriously. This reflects two different models, the self-defense model and the women's role in society model.

In short the self-defense model, refers to the way of defending against violence and ridicule. The women's role in society model, refers to the level contemporary women are out and about in society, in which a higher level leads to more vulnerability for being a victim of crime.
