= Women's police station in the United States =

Women’s police station refers to specialized units within police departments that were historically created to address issues involving women and children and were usually operated by women police. The United States mostly created women’s bureaus, divisions, and specialized units within already-existing law enforcement agencies, in contrast to other nations that set up independent, stand-alone police operated solely by women. These units dealt with issues involving domestic violence, sexual violence, child abuse, and juvenile delinquency.

The important of women's police stations in the United States on contemporary, victim-centered policing techniques is another significant feature. The early women's bureaus and divisions influenced how law enforcement handle cases involving domestic violence, sexual assault, and child abuse, even though the United States did not frequently construct stand-alone women's police stations. Over time, the systems which dealt with these issues involved in present day specialized units, for example, Special Victims Units (SVUs), which focus on trauma informed care and collaboration with social services. Individuals have come to understand that it is not enough to intervene only through legal action in cases of gender-based violence but that institutions must also provide emotional support and access to community resources. Because of this, policing tactics, training, and practices throughout the United States continue to be influenced by the legacy of these early women-focused units.

== History ==
=== Early Beginnings: Police Women ===
The roots of what people see today in terms of women's roles in American policing go back to the middle of the 19th century which saw the introduction of police matrons. Matrons began working in cities like New York in the 1850s, caring for female and juvenile convicts. Matrons were not sworn in as officers and had no authority to initiate arrests, even though they performed crucial tasks related to the welfare and custody of these people.

=== Emergence of Policewomen ===
In the early 20th century, there was a large shift at the time of the appointment of female officers into police forces which had previously been all male. When Alice Stebbins Wells joined the Los Angeles Police Department in 1910, it was the first time a woman had taken on a full-fledged police officer position. Her appointment was symbolic of the increasing recognition of what women brought to the field of law enforcement which in turn gave encouragement to other departments to also include female members.

=== Formation of Women's Bureaus and Divisions ===
Following that initial set of appointments many police forces put dedicated women's units in place. The Women's Division was established by the Los Angeles Police Department, and the Women's Bureau was established by the Chicago Police Department in 1913. These units dealt with issues related to women and youth which at the time included sexual crimes, domestic issues, missing person reports and what they termed moral welfare issues.

While these units operated similarly to women's police stations in other nations, they were required to be integrated within the framework of pre-existing police departments rather than operating independently. Additionally, at the time female officers' roles were tied to investigation, counseling, and social service which in turn meant they rarely if at all took part in patrol duties.

Social attitudes and institutional restrictions that saw law enforcement as a male profession limited the roles that women could play in police. Even after trailblazers like Alice Stebbins Wells entered the field, early female officers were frequently limited to caregiving or social service tasks and banned from patrol duties sand promotions. These changes in which individuals see the turn began with the women's rights movement and the passage of laws, like the Civil Right Act of 1964, which put in place the base for equal employment. By the 1970s what individuals see is that many police departments began to include women in a wider range of law enforcement roles which in turn gave them more authority and responsibility.

=== Mid-20th Century Developments ===
During the 20th century up to mid-point of its run, women in police forces had little progress which included that they had no profound change for promotion. They faced discrimination because of their gender. However, the women's rights movement brought about social and legal developments in the 1960s and 1970s, which led to women taking on more responsibilities in the police force.

"Title VII of the Civil Rights Act of 1964" ended sex-based discrimination in the workplace and encouraged the inclusion of women into mainstream law enforcement. Therefore, many departments took to dissolving their women's bureaus and put female officers out on patrol, and into other operational assignments.

=== Modern Specialized Units ===
In the case of countries like Brazil, India, and Argentina, which did see the introduction of delicate women's police stations to handle gender-based violence, the United States took a different approach. In the United States, specialized units have been created, including:

- Domestic violence units.
- Sexual assault or special victims' units.
- Family services or victim assistance units.
- Human trafficking task forces.

While still being a part of the larger organizational framework of police departments, these units offer services including victim support, crisis intervention, and specialized investigations that are comparable to those provided by women's police stations.

== Policewomen in New York City ==
Women started working in New York City's jail in the 1800s by cleaning cells and, sometimes supervising prisoners. By 1890s, women began to work with female crime victims, with cases of sex crimes and matters involving children and babies, but they were still not allowed to hold the title of "officer". Although there was comparable building in the early 20th century, the New York City Police Department did not have permanent, stand-alone women's police stations like those in some other nations. In 1921, the Women's Police Unit which was put into place by the New York City Police Department saw the light of day, indeed this was a first of its kind which saw to it that the female officers dealt with cases related to women, children and moral welfare issues. However, the unit was disbanded in 1923. The Women's Bureau, which functioned inside the department and addressed problems like juvenile delinquency, domestic conflicts, and sexual offenses, was created in 1924. These advancements drew upon prior positions such as police matrons, who oversaw female inmates' but had little authority in the middle of the 1800s. Through time, after mid 20th century reforms, New York City transitioned from gender-based policing to full integration which saw the disappearance of women's units and women's entry into all roles. Even though there are no women only police stations anymore, specialist departments like victim services and domestic violence units nevertheless perform comparable tasks inside a single policing system.

== Important Women in Law Enforcement in United States ==
- Alice Stebbins Wells One of the first American women to be sworn in as a police officer in Los Angeles, 1910. She promoted greater female recruitment and contributed to the legitimization of women's roles in law enforcement.
- Lola Baldwin The first United States police officer in Portland, Oregon, 1908.
- Isabella Goodwin' The first New York City's female police detective. Goodwin went undercover to expose a bank robber in 1912.
- Georgia Ann Robinson The United States' first black female police officer in Los Angeles, 1916. She was a detective as well as an advocate for abuse of victims.
- Mary Hamilton Lead one of the first attempts at a women-focused police force, the Women's Police Precinct in New York City, 1921.
- Cathy Lanier The Washington, D.C. Metropolitan Police Department's first female chief is renowned for her leadership and modern policing innovations.
- Juanita Holmes One of the New York Police Department's highest ranking uniformed posts, Chief of Patrol, was held by the first Black women.
- Catrina Bonus The United States Secret Service Uniformed Division's first female Deputy Chief in its 100-year history.
