= Mary A. Sullivan =

New York City detective (1878/1879–1950)

Mary Agnes Sullivan
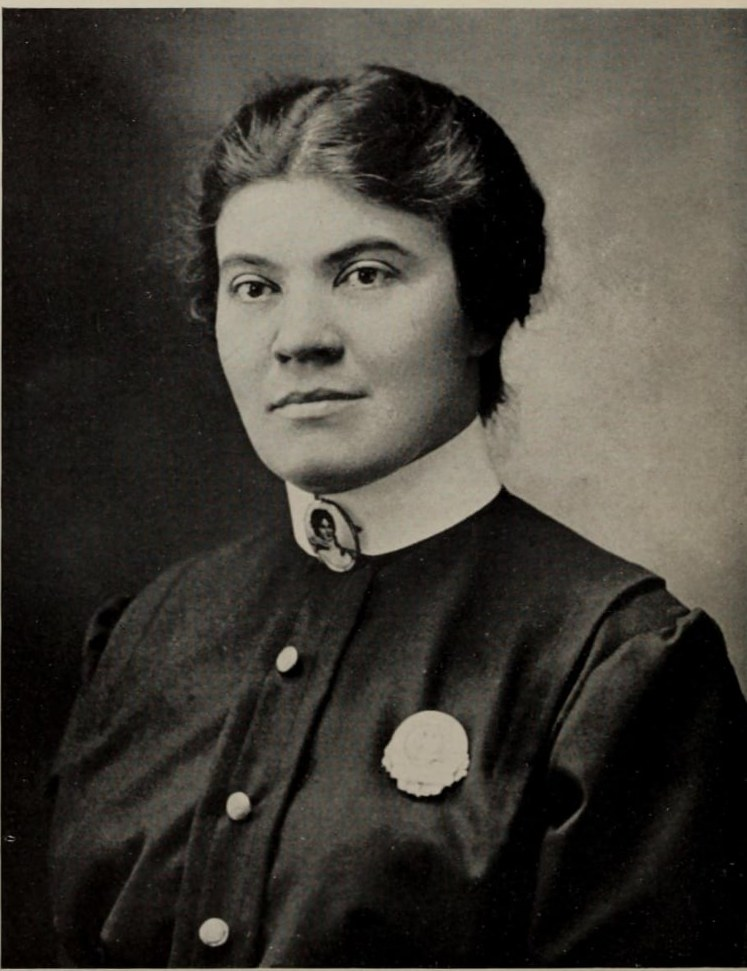
- Sullivan in 1911
- Born: 1878 or 1879
- Died: September 11, 1950
- Occupation: Police officer
- Years active: 1911–1946
- Employer: New York City Police Department
- Known for: First woman homicide detective
- Children: Grace Marie Lagay

Mary Agnes Sullivan (1878 or 1879 – September 11, 1950) was a pioneering policewoman in New York City for 35 years. She was the first woman homicide detective in the New York City Police Department. She was also the first woman to make lieutenant, the second woman to achieve the rank of first grade detective, and the first woman inducted into the NYPD Honor Legion. She had a 35-year career with the NYPD, the last 20 of which was as director of the bureau of policewomen.

== Early life ==
She was born and raised on Gansevoort Street in the Greenwich Village neighborhood of New York City, the daughter of John J. and Johanna Gayne Sullivan, both immigrants from Killarney in Ireland. She was named for a Catholic nun named Sister Mary Agnes, a good friend of her mother's. She had six brothers and one sister.

Her father was a grocer but many family members were on the police force, including her brothers and an uncle as well as three cousins. She also had a cousin who worked for Scotland Yard.

She married a businessman named Timothy D. Sullivan in 1904. In 1905 she had a baby daughter but her husband suddenly died, leaving her a young widow with an infant. For a time she had a job as a salesgirl at the Siegel-Cooper Company department store, where she had some success but also befriended the store detective. That woman pointed out to Sullivan that there were now positions on the police force for women.

== Police career ==
Sullivan took the exam to join the police in March 1911 with hundreds of others. She was confused by many of the questions, but soon found out she had gotten the fifth highest score on the test, and was offered a job. When she joined the force on June 2, 1911 at the West 47th Street station it was as a "police matron". Her duties often involved processing women prisoners. Although matrons were not considered part of the police ranks, they were required to take a civil service examination to get their positions.

Sullivan quickly made a name for herself in the department via her involvement in the Rosenthal murder case. The police initially arrested Frank Cirofici in the case, and his "moll" Rosie Harris pleaded for his release. The police had Sullivan go undercover to befriend Rosie and work her for information. She adopted the role of a boarding house keeper. Eventually she met the wives of other suspects Harry Horowitz, Louis Rosenberg, and Jacob Seidenshner. Sullivan learned key details about the men's habits, and tailed the women when she wasn't with them. All three men were caught via wiretaps enabled by Sullivan's work. That work brought an end to the then-notorious Lenox Avenue Gang.

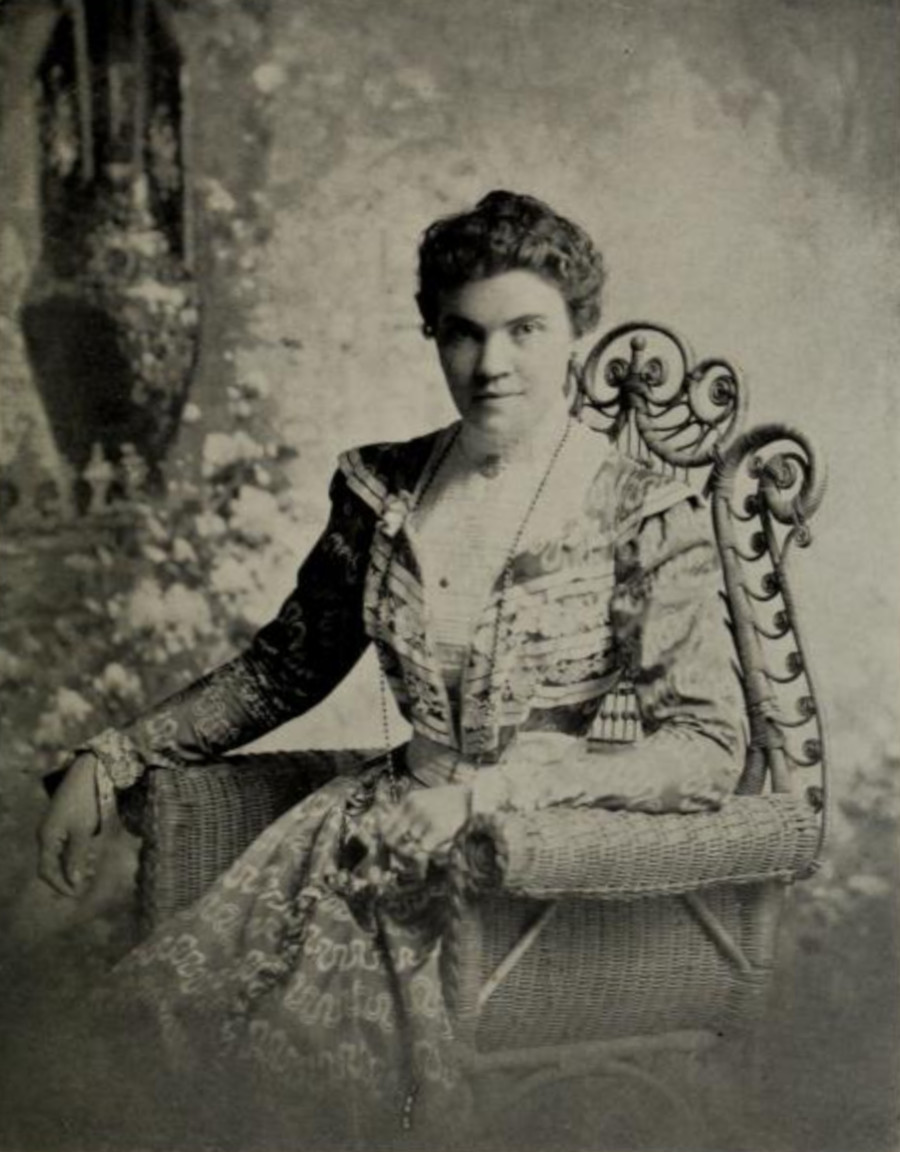
Sullivan in 1909

From 1913 to 1918 Sullivan was assigned to Harlem where as a detective she investigated illicit activities in "clip joints" and other crimes.

On March 20, 1918, she was made a detective in the department's Homicide Squad, the first woman in the department. She had much success in this department, solving many murder cases.

In 1918 she also co-founded city's Policewoman's Endowment Association in an effort to lobby the department for better treatment of its women employees, such as equal pay. Over many years she served as its President, and in that position took complaints to the New York State Assembly in Albany. Her successes angered her NYPD bosses, who demoted her back to matron and transferred her to Long Island.

However, Sullivan continued her good work with the department. On April 15, 1925 she was inducted into the NYPD's Honor Legion for her work in obtaining evidence in the Harry Fenton murder case the previous year, from the murderer's wife. At the time she was the only woman to receive that award.

In April 1926 she was made head of the Women's Bureau at the department (the first time a woman headed such a department in the U.S.) and elevated to the rank of lieutenant, the first woman to achieve this rank in the NYPD. In this position she supervised 75 other women. By 1929 this number had grown to 125, but Sullivan pleaded for the department to hire more. (By contrast there were 18,000 men on the police force at the time).

On October 2, 1926, she was made a first grade detective by then Police Commissioner George V. McLaughlin. She was only the second woman to attain that rank (the first was Isabella Goodwin).

Sullivan had another career setback when, in April 1929 she led a raid of one of Margaret Sanger's birth control clinics, leading to protests. (Sanger herself was not arrested, but she accompanied her doctors and nurses to the police station). On May 11, 1929, Sullivan was demoted from director of the Women's Bureau and made assistant to the new director. She said she believed it was unrelated. The New York City Federation of Women's Clubs complained to the department about the appointment of a man to head the department. Sullivan's demotion did not last long, she was quietly reinstated a few months later.

In 1931 it was announced Sullivan and her policewomen would be working on a new initiative against "fortune tellers, palmists, mediums, clairvoyants" with the assistance of Julien Proskauer and the Society of American Magicians. Sullivan had dealt with fraud of this nature in several cases previously.

By her retirement in April 1946, she was only one of three women to reach first grade detective in the NYPD, and worked with famous NYPD detectives such as Arthur Carey and John Coughlin. Notwithstanding the temporary demotion in 1929, she was director of the Policewoman's Bureau for 20 years from 1926 to 1946.

In 1938 she published an autobiography entitled My Double Life which was optioned as a motion picture but never produced.

== Death and legacy ==
She died September 11, 1950, at St. Vincent's Hospital after a "brief illness". At time of her death (at age 71) she lived on West Twelfth street, still in Greenwich Village. Her funeral at St. Bernard's Church was attended by 139 police officers and a total of 700 people. She was survived by three of her brothers, her daughter, two grandchildren and three great-grandchildren. She was buried at Calvary Cemetery in Queens.

Her daughter Grace Marie Lagay carried on the family legacy as a detective – she trained as a police officer and later worked as a hotel detective and as a consultant to a detective agency run by her mother after retirement.

== In popular media ==
- ABC Radio Network (Spring 1946 – June 1947) broadcast a 15 minute radio drama about her career titled "Police Woman", Sullivan herself narrated. In the stories Sullivan was played by Betty Garde and the show was produced by Phillips Lord and sponsored by Carter's Pills.
- True Comics #67 (December 1947) dramatized her career in "Lady Detective" in this issue.

== See also ==
- Lola Baldwin – early policewoman in Portland
- Marie Owens – of Chicago, possibly the first policewoman in the U.S.
- Mary Shanley – another early woman NYPD detective
- Alice Stebbins Wells – early policewoman in Los Angeles

== Bibliography ==
- Sullivan, Mary (1938). My Double Life: The Story of a New York Policewoman. New York: Farrar & Rinehart, Inc. OCLC 1179909 – via Internet Archive.
- Loxton, Daniel (Winter 2013). "Ghostbuster Girls!". Junior Skeptic. Vol. 18, no. 1. pp. 80–89. ISSN 1063-9330.
- Whalen, Bernard; Whalen, Jon (2014). The NYPD's First Fifty Years: Politicians, Police Commissioners, and Patrolmen. Lincoln, Nebraska: Potomac Books. pp. 132, 151. ISBN 978-1612346564. OCLC 980700069.
- Segrave, Kerry (2014). Policewomen: A History (2nd ed.). Jefferson, NC: McFarland & Company, Inc. pp. 156–158, 190. ISBN 978-0786477050. OCLC 879792055 – via Google Books.
- Mullenbach, Cheryl (2016). Women in Blue : 16 Brave Officers, Forensics Experts, Police Chiefs, and More. Chicago: Chicago Review Press. pp. 55–68. ISBN 978-1613734223. OCLC 920683298 – via Google Books.
- Janik, Erika (2016). Pistols and Petticoats: 175 Years of Lady Detectives in Fact and Fiction. Boston: Beacon Press. p. 238. ISBN 978-0807039380. OCLC 920817633.
