= Police woman (disambiguation) =

A police woman is a female police officer.

Police woman may also refer to:

- Police Woman (TV series), a 1970s American drama, starring Angie Dickinson
- Police Women (TV series), a 2009 American reality documentary series
- Police Woman (film), a 1974 martial arts movie, starring Yuen Qiu (with a cameo by Jackie Chan)
- Policewomen (film), a 1974 exploitation film
- Policewoman (film), a 1974 Italian comedy film
- The Policewoman, a 2003 Portuguese drama film

== See also ==
- Marie Owens (1853–1927), believed to be the first U.S. female police officer, 1891
- Alice Stebbins Wells (1873–1957), believed to be the first American-born female police officer, 1910
- Margaret Q. Adams (1874–1974), believed to be the first female U.S. deputy sheriff, 1912
