= Sybil Plumlee =

American teacher, caseworker, and police officer (1911–2012)

- Born: Sybil Virginia Burgess; April 29, 1911; Seattle, Washington, U.S.
- Died: January 6, 2012 (aged 100); Lake Oswego, Oregon, U.S.
- Occupations: Teacher; police officer
- Known for: Pioneering female officer and, before her death, the oldest surviving former member of the Portland Police Bureau
- Spouses: Lloyd Barker; Virgil P. "Paul" Plumlee (1945–2010)
- Children: Louis Barker

Sybil Virginia Plumlee (née Burgess; April 29, 1911 – January 6, 2012) was an American teacher, caseworker, and police officer who served in Portland, Oregon's Women's Protective Division, a special unit of the Portland Police Bureau, from 1947 to 1967. She is recognized as a pioneer in the law enforcement field, which has historically been dominated by men.

Born in Seattle in 1911, Plumlee attended high school in Portland and then graduated from Oregon Normal School, now known as Western Oregon University. She became a school teacher in Clarno, Oregon, but later returned to Portland, where she married and had a son. Following a divorce in 1943, she worked as an educator with the Ellis Mining Company in Bourne, Oregon. In 1945, she married Virgil "Paul" Plumlee, who died in 2010.

Plumlee wrote an unpublished memoir of her experiences on the police force, called Badge 357. At age 96, she published Stories of Hester Ann Bolin Harvey and Her Family, a collection of family stories and history. Plumlee was the oldest living former member of the city's police force prior to her death in 2012.

== Early life, education, and teaching career ==
Sybil Virginia Burgess was born on April 29, 1911, in Seattle, Washington. She was the daughter of Charles and Stella Burgess. The family moved to Portland, where she attended both Lincoln High School and Jefferson High School, graduating from Jefferson in 1930. After graduating from Oregon Normal School (now known as Western Oregon University) in 1932, she spent some time working as a teacher in a single-room school located in Clarno, Oregon. She returned to Portland, married Lloyd Barker (who was also an instructor), and had a son, Louis Barker. The couple divorced in 1943.

After the divorce, Sybil worked during World War II as a teacher for the Ellis Mining Company in Bourne, Oregon, and buying a $150 house in nearby Sumpter for herself and her son. Plumlee also occasionally worked as a soda fountain clerk at a drugstore in northeast Portland, and as a cab driver. In 1945, she married Virgil P. "Paul" Plumlee. She survived the 1948 flood that destroyed Vanport, Oregon.

== Police career ==
While Plumlee was working as a caseworker for the welfare department of Clackamas County, a female police officer encouraged her to take a civil service test. She passed the test, and was selected from a pool of 300 applicants to fill the Portland Police Bureau's only open position. According to Louis Barker, his mother became a police officer "for the money" rather than to "make the world safe". The family needed her income: Paul, a World War II veteran, suffered from posttraumatic stress disorder and had difficulty holding steady jobs, and Plumlee was also contributing to the support of her aging mother. She served in the unit known as the Women's Protective Division from 1947 to 1967. Policewomen in that division did not work with male officers other than those assigned to the Juvenile Division, and did not wear uniforms. Their work focused on crimes like child abuse, domestic violence, and rape.

Plumlee often responded to cases involving child abuse or abandonment. Records show that she also participated in undercover investigations, including an anti-homosexual campaign organized by Mayor of Portland Dorothy McCullough Lee. In 1949, the Women's Protective Division sent Plumlee and Edna Trout to Music Hall, which was known at the time for catering to gay men and lesbians, with the intention to "apprehend lesbians who might approach them and solicit attentions". Plumlee also helped educate women on how to avoid victimization. In a 1955 article by The Oregonian called "Pickpockets Beware", she was photographed illustrating how a woman might be susceptible to pickpocketing by opening her billfold in public. In 1957, the paper published a photograph of Plumlee and five other women at a shooting range, with the caption: "Feminine pistol team makes good showing in contest with all-male team from North precinct as interdivisional tournament gets under way". In 1959, two brothers were charged with disorderly conduct and destroying city property after tearing the speaker system from a police car occupied by Plumlee and another female officer. Plumlee also participated in civic events such as luncheons. At a 1964 Portland Yacht Club luncheon called "Women with the Badge", she told female attendees how they should protect themselves and their children. In 1967, she presented slides depicting dangers to women on urban streets to the Women's Council of the Portland Board of Realtors at the Hoyt Hotel.

Plumlee later said of the unit: "In some ways, the old Women's Protective Division was archaic, but on balance we did a lot of good." She is recognized as a pioneer in the largely male-dominated law enforcement field. As of 2006, women doing police work in the United States were about 14 percent of the total number of police.

== Later life, writing, and other interests ==
Plumlee purchased her first computer when she was in her eighties, and continued driving until age 98. Plumlee wrote an unpublished memoir of her experiences on the police force, which was called Badge 357. At age 96, she published the book Stories of Hester Ann Bolin Harvey and Her Family. The collection of stories, including one of her grandmother's journey across the Oregon Trail in 1850, included photographs and more than a century of her family history. Plumlee also enjoyed camping, fishing, genealogy, and traveling.

Her husband Paul died in 2010. In 2011, she celebrated her centennial birthday at her residence in Lake Oswego, Oregon. Guests included Multnomah County Sheriff Daniel Staton, her great-niece Lieutenant Mary Lindstrand, also from the Multnomah County Sheriff's Office, and Frank Springer, then age 99 and the oldest living male retiree of the Portland Police Bureau. Birthday wishes and certificates of appreciation were also presented to her from President Barack Obama and Mayor of Portland Sam Adams.

Plumlee died on January 6, 2012. Before her death, Plumlee was the oldest surviving former member of the Portland Police Bureau.

== See also ==
- Law enforcement in the United States
- Lists of centenarians
- Lola Baldwin, the first female police officer in Portland, Oregon, and one of the first in the United States (1908)
- Penny Harrington, the Portland Police Bureau's first female chief of police
