= Margaret Q. Adams =

American law enforcement officer

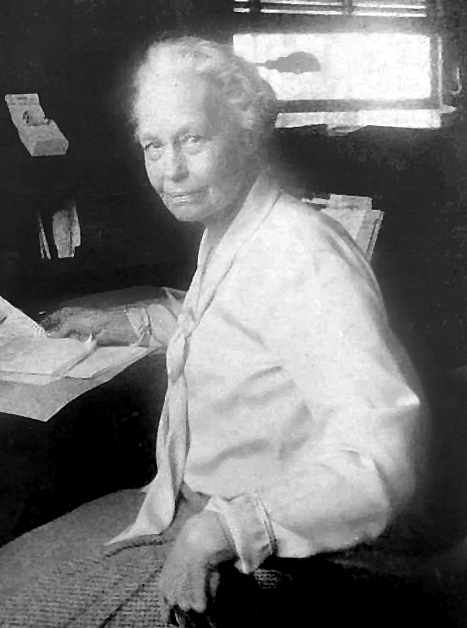
- Born: July 26, 1874; Dover, Kentucky, US
- Died: January 7, 1974 (aged 99); Costa Mesa, California, US
- Police career
- Department: Los Angeles County Sheriff's Department
- Service years: 1912 - 1947

Margaret Queen Adams (July 26, 1874 – January 7, 1974), née Margaret Queen Phillips, became the first woman deputy sheriff in the United States in 1912. She served in the Los Angeles County Sheriff's Department (LASD) from 1912 to 1947.

Margaret Phillips was born in Kentucky, but moved to California with her family when she was nine years old and settled in downtown Los Angeles. She was the second of five children. She graduated from Los Angeles High School. Her older sister Lillian married William A. Hammel, who was sheriff of Los Angeles County twice (1899–1902, 1907–14) and chief of the Los Angeles Police Department from 1904 to 1905. One of Adams's brothers, Oliver Roy Phillips, was also in law enforcement, being a police officer for the Los Angeles Police Department.

Margaret Phillips married Elmer Adams on January 1, 1899, in Santa Ana, California. They had two children, Wilbur Vernon Adams and Anna Margaretta Adams Bowdish.

In 1912, Margaret Adams and her husband Elmer separated. As she needed to support her two children, her brother-in-law Sheriff William A. Hammel asked her to work at the Los Angeles Sheriff's Office. According to family lore, she accepted the job, but only on the condition that she would be deputized. She took the oath of office on February 16, 1912, and began work in the Civil Division under Juan Murrieta.

Margaret Q. Adams served the LASD for 35 years until her retirement in 1947. By that time, she coordinated almost all of the evidence being processed through the Los Angeles Courthouse. Because of the importance of her work, she became close to several of the sheriffs succeeding Bill Hammel. She was even godmother to Judge Warren Biscailuz, son of Sheriff Eugene W. Biscailuz (sheriff from 1932 to 1958).

After retirement, Margaret Adams helped to raise her granddaughter, Margaret Irene (Bowdish) McDonald, after her daughter, Anna Margaretta, died of breast cancer. Margaret I. McDonald carried on the family's pioneering ways, being the first woman to work on the floor of the Pacific Stock Exchange in November 1963.

Margaret Queen Adams died in Costa Mesa, California, on January 7, 1974, six months short of her 100th birthday. She was buried next to her daughter at Inglewood Park Cemetery in Inglewood, California, wearing her sheriff's shield.

== See also ==
- Alice Stebbins Wells, first U.S.-born woman to be hired by any police department, in Los Angeles, California, in 1910.
- Georgia Ann Robinson, first African-American police officer, hired in Los Angeles in 1916.
