= Mary Shanley =

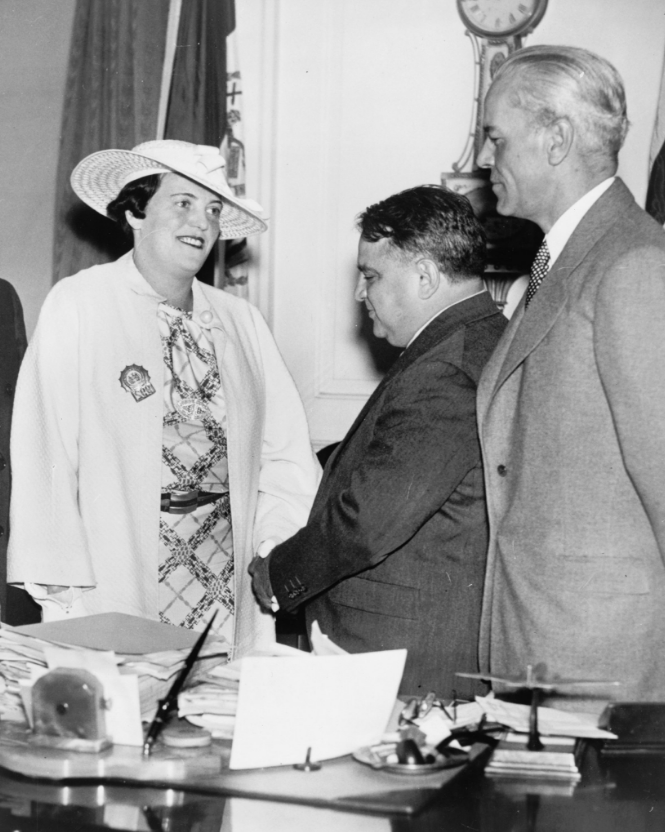

Mary Agnes Shanley (March 14, 1896 – July 3, 1989) was an American police officer and detective in the New York Police Department. She joined the department in 1931 and by 1939 was the fourth woman to achieve the rank of first-grade detective in the NYPD. She is credited with over a thousand arrests during her career. She was perhaps the first policewoman in New York City to use her gun in the arrest of a suspect.

== Biography ==
Mary Shanley was born into an Irish-American family and grew up in Hell's Kitchen. Her father was born in New York while her mother, Anna, emigrated from County Leitrim.

Shanley was on the pickpocket detective squad in the NYPD. She was a minor celebrity in New York City news, appearing in articles chasing down and arresting thieves and pickpockets. She favored using her gun while on the job, earning her the moniker "Dead Shot Mary". Of her, The New York Times wrote in 1938:

In more than seven years on the police force Miss Shanley has had considerable experience with man-catching. Sometimes she has had to use her .32-caliber revolver. Once she used her leather pocketbook to knock down her quarry. ... Mayor La Guardia once praised her for demonstrating "not only keen intelligence and fine police work but also courage at a moment when courage was needed."

In 1941, Shanley shot her gun while she was off-duty and intoxicated at a bar in Jackson Heights, Queens. She was demoted from first-grade detective to policewoman and placed under suspension, but returned to duty after only a month. She was promoted to detective again later.

She retired in 1957. She never married or had children, and died in 1989.

== Legacy ==
Her great-nephew Patrick Mullins produced a documentary about her, Sleuthing Mary Shanley in 2006. In 2016, actress Rachel McPhee put on a one-woman show devoted to her, Dead Shot Mary, at the Bridge Theater in New York City.

== See also ==
- Isabella Goodwin - the first woman NYPD detective
- Mary A. Sullivan - another woman NYPD detective who was head of the Policewomen's Bureau as well
