= International Association of Women Police =

- Abbreviation: IAWP
- Predecessor: International Policewomen's Association
- Formation: 1915
- Founder: Alice Stebbins Wells
- Type: Global organization
- Purpose: "strengthen, unite and raise the profile of women in criminal justice internationally."
- Region served: International
- Services: Annual training conferences, scholarships, awards
- Fields: Criminal justice, policing
- Formerly called: International Policewomen's Association (1915-1956)

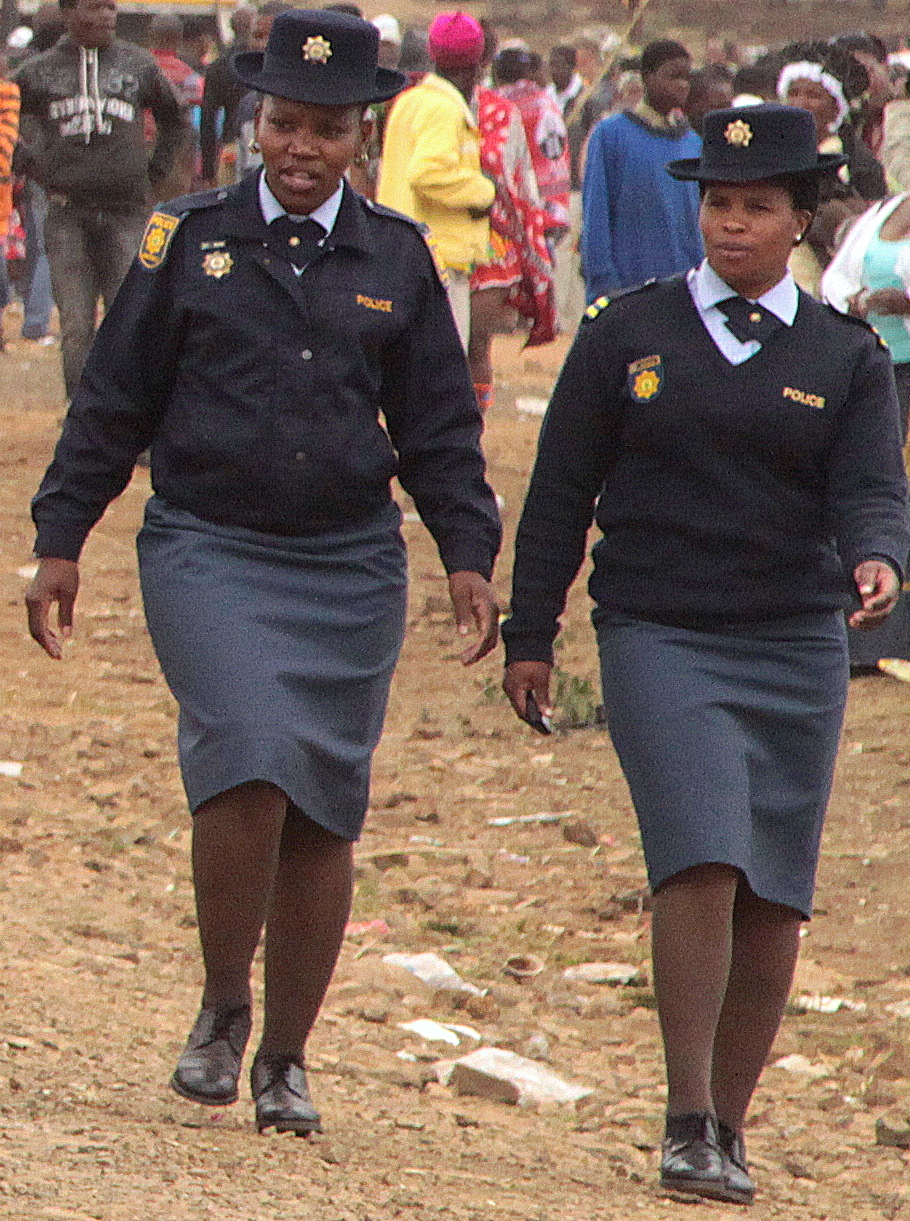
Police women at the Zulu Reed Dance Ceremony in South Africa

The International Association of Women Police (IAWP) is a global organization for women in criminal justice professions. Its mission is to "strengthen, unite and raise the profile of women in criminal justice internationally."

== Mission and Vision ==
According to the IAWP website, its mission, as stated in Article III, is to “strengthen, unite and raise the profile of women in criminal justice internationally”. Its vision is to ensure that “women’s lives [are] free from discrimination, valued for their contribution, and treated with respect and dignity. To contribute by being an example of excellence in securing a safe, harmonious workplace and society as partners in safety in the criminal justice system”. These core beliefs and objectives encompass the main message of the International Association of Women Police, and focus on standing up for the equal treatment that each woman on the police force deserves.

== History ==
The International Policewomen's Association was founded in 1915. Alice Stebbins Wells, one of the first policewoman in the United States, was appointed the association's first president. Its charter was adopted in 1916 in Washington, D.C. From 1919–1932, the president of the association was Mina Van Winkle, and Helen D. Pigeon was the association's executive secretary. After her death, the association dwindled. It was not until 1956 that the association was revived at a meeting of the Women Peace Officers of California, where it was renamed the International Association of Women Police. Lois Higgins, a veteran of the Chicago Police Department, was elected the association's president, and under her leadership the IAWP grew in strength and numbers. The organization fought discrimination against women in the police force and opposed separate women's bureaus within police departments.

The Records of the International Association of Women Police are housed in the Lloyd Sealy Library Special Collections, John Jay College of Criminal Justice.

== Causes for Formation ==
As Stated in its Mission and Vision Statements, The International Association of Women Police came to be in order to fight against the discrimination of women on police forces across the world. Fighting against cases of sexual harassment, limited job opportunities, and discriminatory treatment from male colleagues have all been key reasons for catalyzing the formation of an organization that promotes the equal treatment of women on the police force. The IAWP also works to ensure that women are satisfied with their careers on the force, and to make sure they do not feel powerless or unappreciated in their line of work. Overall, the IAWP was formed in order to promote equality among the sexes in the police force and to ensure the equal treatment, equal pay, and equal protection of women who chose a career in the criminal justice system.

== Harassment ==
The IAWP promotes the idea that female officers should not live in fear of harassment, and should be treated with respect and fairness from each of their coworkers. The members of this organization work to deconstruct the social stigmas that follow women on to the police force. Sanda K. Wells and Betty L. Alt discuss the many forms of harassment in their book “Police Women: Life With a Badge. They discuss how one of the most common occurrences on the force is the issue of harassment. Sexual harassment and a hostile environment are most commonly dealt with. Wells and Alt go on the define the forms of harassment; sexual harassment encompasses unwanted sexual advances such as requesting sexual acts, or promising a promotion or pay raise in return for a sexual favor. A hostile environment involves any act that unwanted and may have a negative effect on the person being acted against and their job performance. This may be in the form of offensive or rude remarks about a person’s body or gender. According to their book, anyone is capable of harassment; it is not limited to just men harassing women. Other forms of harassment involve inappropriate touching, remarks about one’s body, and offensive remarks that degrade the individual. According to Women and Policing News Wire, 80 percent of women on the police force have encountered or been a victim of harassment on the job. Wells and Alt go on to say that few women feel the need to report the colleagues that harass them and usually let the harassment slide, due to the fact that many women who report their harassment end up being accused of various crimes such as drug abuse, child abuse, receive death threats, and fail to receive backup when they call for it. ”

== Discrimination ==
One of the main goals that the IAWP prides itself on is the abolishment of discrimination of women on the police force. One of the main forms of discrimination, as discussed in Well's and Alt's book “Police Women: Life With a Badge” is gender harassment. For example, not being provided a separate place from men in order to change into the work uniform is defined as a form of discrimination. One case mentioned encompasses a woman officer who that had been on the force for years was not given a locker or changing space, yet a rookie male cop who had just joined the force was given a locker as soon as he entered the police force. This is means for investigation on the discrimination that women face. “Police Women: Life With a Badge” also goes on to talk about women police officers that become pregnant during their time on the force. Not being given lighter duties due to pregnancy is also an issue that some policewomen must face. Pregnancy may hinder movement and other physical activity on the job, and not being given enough time to recuperate after having a child may result in a decrease in job performance. Because of this, some employees see this as grounds to discriminate against pregnant coworkers, and some agencies fail to provide basic rights such as maternity uniforms or leave benefits for these policewomen.

== Limited Job Opportunities ==
The IAWP prides itself on equality, and ensuring that women are presented equal opportunities in their career is one of its many focusses. An issue discussed in “Police Women: Life With a Badge” are the limited job opportunities that may follow women through the criminal justice career path. For example, a woman may only be given duties involving child abuse, sex crimes, and domestic abuse and not be given the chance to participate in more intensive cases that are deemed “more masculine” such as gang related violence or murder. Women may also not be given the same opportunities as men when it comes to issues such as promotions and chances to further themselves in the criminal justice career. Forms of discipline also seem to have inequalities on the police force; where a woman may receive punishment, a man seems to receive none. Women are also dealt harsher punishments than men on the police force. There is also the concern that women are held to a different standard than men on the job. There are different expectations for women to fulfill on performance evaluations and are expected to perform differently overall than men, and not fulfilling these expectations may hinder them from having a successful career. Lastly, women tend to not receive equal consideration for special training and important assignments as men. While a male officer may be asked to go on a special assignment, a female officer may be forced to handle less serious matters.

== Equal Treatment ==
All across the world, efforts are being made to ensure the equal treatment of women is being reached. This is especially noticeable in countries such as Sweden, the Netherlands, Austria, and Catalonia. For the most part few women participate in policing in Europe, and still have a difficult time receiving the same treatment as men, however, according to Tanja Van Der Lippe, Anne Graumans, and Selma Sevenhuijsen, authors of “Gender Policies and the Position of Women in the Police Force in European Countries,” inequalities may still exist now, but at the rate of how things are changing, it is more than possible to change the social norms that have been engrained into the minds of people on the police force. The IAWP has an intense focus on this area, and works to promote fairness amongst both men and women that hold careers in the criminal justice system.

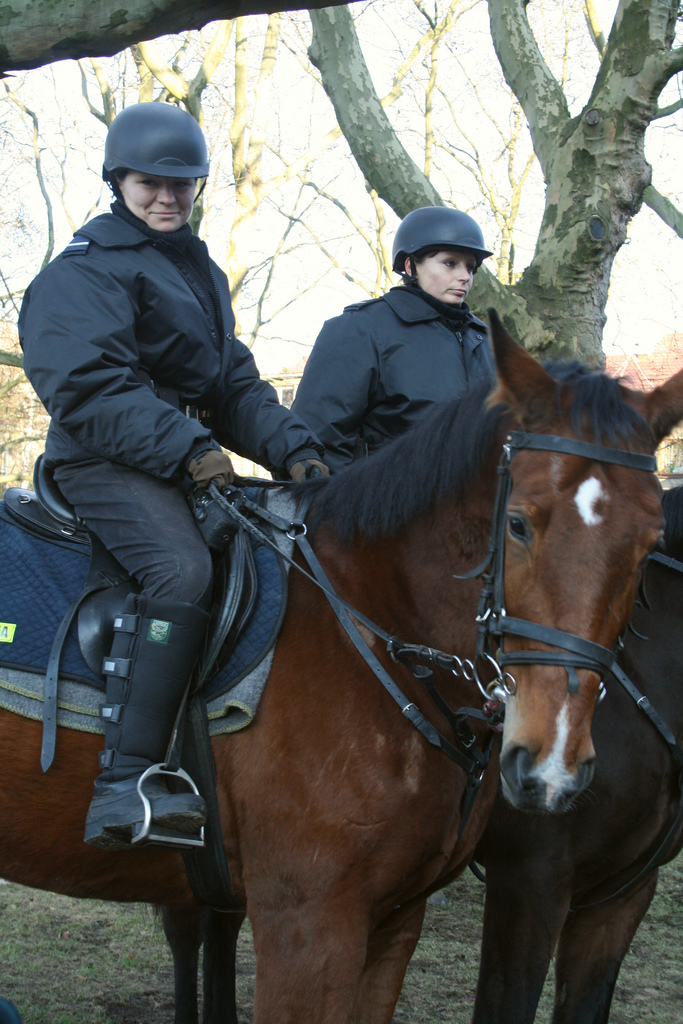
Mounted policewomen in Poland.

== Prostitution Stings ==
Women police offices have also been subject to one form or police work that has been deemed questionable by many: prostitution stings. According to Mary Dodge, Donna Starr-Gimeno, and Thomas Williams, authors of “Puttin’ on the Sting: Women Police Officers' Perspectives on Reverse Prostitution Assignments,” prostitution stings may both endanger the lives of women officers or may degrade them. This journal article mentions how women who take up this position may be objectified by male coworkers. It also offers important insight as to how sting operations may endanger and humiliate women, while men who participate in such operations do not face these consequences. Many police women feel as if they are being used for their bodies, and feel repulsed by the idea that they are acting as nothing more than an object in order to detain a man that is willing to pay for sex. There is also a sense of humiliation that goes along with this process; if the police woman is approached by a man willing to pay for sexual favors, that in itself may feel wrong and inappropriate to some women. However, on the opposite end of the spectrum, if a police woman is not approached or asked for her services, her colleagues may make fun of her for not being able to pick anyone up.

== Various Stresses on the Force ==
The discrimination and harassment that may follow some women police offices often leads to many detrimental effects. One of these is strain and stress that is encountered on the job. Not only does unequal treatment lead to stress, but a job on the police force in general may be stressful. According to Leanor Johnson, author of “Job Strain Among Police Officers: Gender Comparisons,” women may begin to feel so stressed from the job that they begin to feel burned out and useless; they feel as if they are not making a difference in the world. Men on the other hand begin to treat citizens as with disrespect and disregard them entirely. While both men and women may handle stress in various ways, there may be some benefits coming from this. Each gender handles the different emotional stresses that may be encountered on the job, thus allowing a wide range of ways in which handling crime can be dealt with. The IAWP makes it known that women are quite capable of handling various difficulties that will appear on the job, and though stress may be difficult to manage, it is not impossible.

== Benefits Resulting From Women Police Officers ==
In recent years, women on the police force have been found to have positive effects on society as a whole. TIME Magazine goes on to talk about the recent hiring of women police officers in Mexico City, and provides insight given from police chief Carlos Ortega Carpinteyro: “women are more trustworthy and take their oath of office more seriously, they don’t ask for or take bribes.” This goes on to show how women are making vital contributions in developing countries and how the police force is only becoming stronger due to the number of women that dedicate their lives to the criminal justice system. By incorporating women into the police force and acknowledging the fact that they can make a difference, the IAWP is fulfilling its duty of ensuring that women are being given the equal opportunity to work just as much as men in the criminal justice system. Barbara Sims, Kathryn E. Scarborough and Janice Ahmad also have quite a bit to say about this topic. These authors of “The Relationship between Police Officers' Attitudes Toward Women and Perceptions of Police” go on to say that if women are fully appreciated on the police force, then the benefit of society is sure to follow. Fighting sexism would, overall, promote the growth and success of society.

== Women Sheriffs and Police Chiefs ==
The IAWP's main goal is to empower women all across the world. One way women are able to do this is by working their way up to important roles on the police force such as sheriff or police chief. In the book “Breaking the Brass Ceiling: Women Police Chiefs and Their Way to the Top,” author Dorothy Moses Shulz discusses the struggles that women are faced with in order to reach the top in their criminal justice career. Difficulties such as sexism and lack of faith in their abilities may hinder some women from attempting to have careers in these positions. Though the journey may be difficult for women in this field, Shulz goes on to say that it is definitely not impossible for a woman to reach the top of this career path.

== In Recent Years ==
In the organization's recent years, the number of women joining the IAWP has grown, and has not just been limited to women. Men that support the rights of women on the police force have also been taking part in the IAWP, and since 1976 male officers have been a part of this organization. In order to spread the word of this group, there have been numerous conferences at various universities and other professional organizations in order to promote the growth and development of the IAWP. These conferences have sparked the attention of many different experts in the field of criminal justice, as well as increase awareness of women working to further themselves in this field. Due to the dramatic increase in female members in the criminal justice system, the IAWP has only become more influential and helpful in promoting women across international borders.

== Programs ==
The IAWP holds annual training conferences in major international cities, featuring invited speakers and exhibitors.

The association offers an international scholarship under the IAWP Scholarship Program. An officer outside of the United States is selected to attend the Annual Training Conference at no expense to the Officer or her police organization. The IAWP also offers prestigious international awards in policing under the IAWP Awards Program. Nominations for each of the categories are solicited and awarded annually on an international basis. The International Association of Women Police is the only non-profit organization to offer international recognition for women in the law enforcement professions.

== Regions and Areas Covered ==
The IAWP has a total of 26 regions where there are coordinators for people to contact. Within each region there is at least one coordinator's email linked onto the official IAWP website. There are coordinators in various states of the US, and all throughout Europe, Africa, and the Caribbean. To find a coordinator closest to any region/location an individual may find thelist on the IAWP official website.

== See also ==
- International Police Association

== Publications ==
- The Policewomen's Bulletin (1962–1974)
- The IAWP Bulletin (1966–1997)
- PoliceWoman (c. 1970 – 1987)
- WomenPolice (1988–present)
