= Lola's Room =

Venue in Portland, Oregon, U.S.

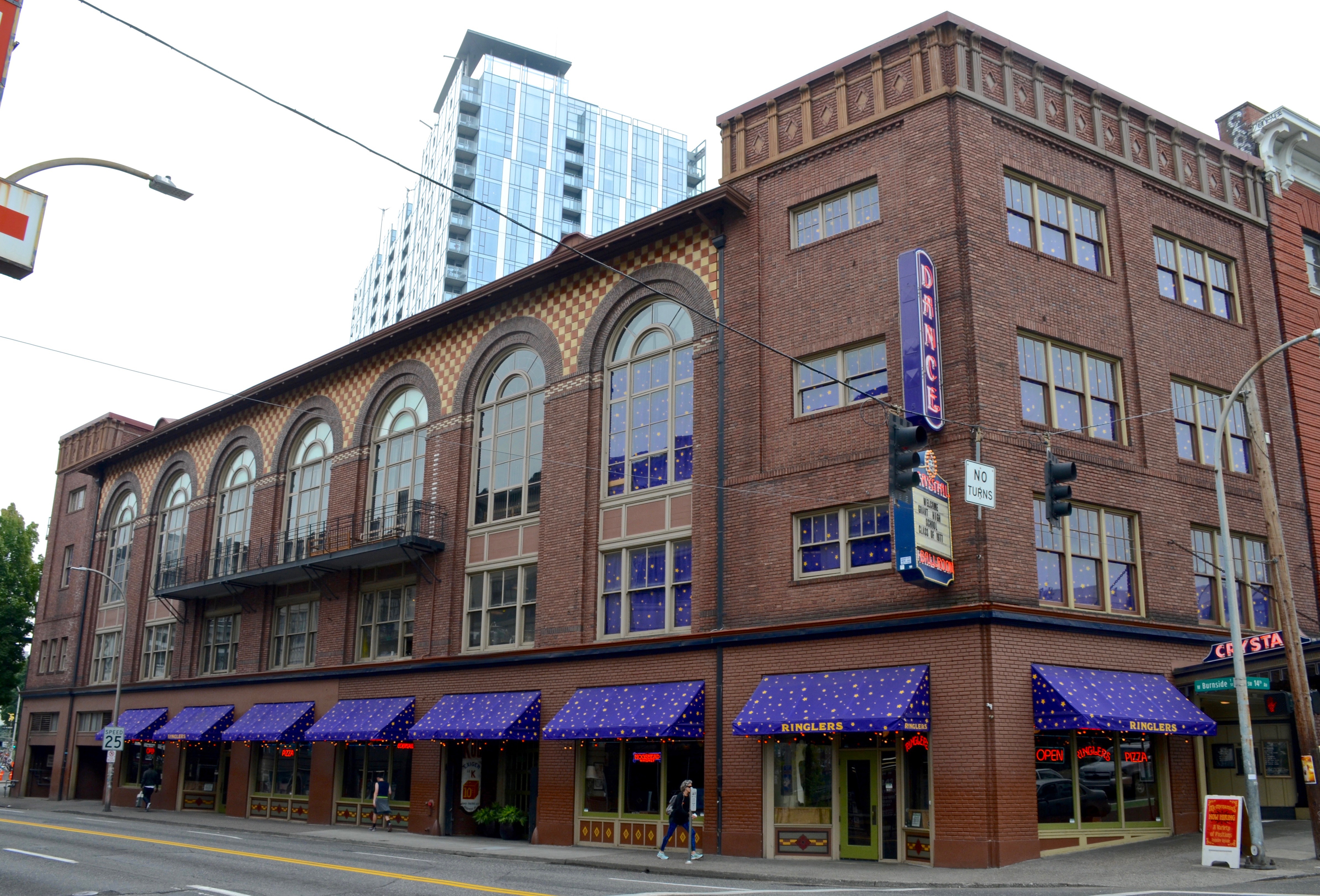
- Lola's Room is operated by McMenamins on the second floor of the Crystal Ballroom (exterior pictured in 2017)
- Interactive map of Lola's Room
- Address: 1332 West Burnside Street; Portland, Oregon; United States
- Coordinates: 45.5228°N 122.6847°W
- Capacity: 350

Construction
- Opened: 2000

Lola's Room is a venue operated by McMenamins inside Portland, Oregon's Crystal Ballroom, in the United States.

== Description ==
Lola's Room is operated by McMenamins as a "secondary venue" on the second floor of the Crystal Ballroom, a historic building on West Burnside Street. The space is named after Lola Baldwin (1860–1957), one of the first policewomen in the United States. Covering the Crystal Ballroom's history, David Greenwald of The Oregonian called Lola's Room "the downstairs space named after the purity-minded policewoman from decades before".

In 2017, the newspaper's Grant Butler wrote, "The little sister of the Crystal Ballroom opened in 2000, and became (and remains) a popular destination on Fridays... A big-screen TV shows vintage videos, while the 'floating' floor offers plenty of bounce. The space has room for 350 people, making it an intimate venue to hear live music."

== History ==
The Decemberists' 2002 performance at Lola's Room funded the group's debut EP 5 Songs. Sleater-Kinney's last appearance prior to a hiatus was at the Crystal Ballroom in August 2006; the group hosted a private party at Lola's Room. The COVID-19 pandemic forced the venue to close temporarily, reopening in August 2021.

=== Recurring events ===
Lola's Room hosted a monthly Bollywood dance event called Jai Ho!, as of 2011. Butler said in 2017, "For a while, Lola's also was home to the twice-monthly Bhangra dance party, hosted by DJ Prashant. The music was Indian pop, and featured dance lessons where people could learn the latest Bhangra moves."

The venue hosted '80s Video Dance Attack weekly for more than a decade, as of 2016, along with special additions such as a Halloween Party in 2021 with shared access to Crystal Ballroom. The venue continued to host weekend '80s and '90s nights in 2017. Lizzy Acker of The Oregonian said the Come As You Are '90s Flashback Dance was "like an older Millennial's best high school dance, but with better booze and music videos playing on screens throughout Lola's Room".

== See also ==
- Culture of Portland, Oregon
