= Helen D. Pigeon =

American policewoman

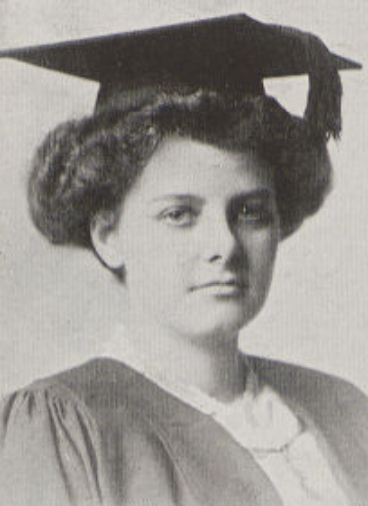
- Helen D. Pigeon, from the 1912 yearbook of Radcliffe College
- Born: January 28, 1889; Boston, Massachusetts, U.S.
- Died: September 26, 1945 (aged 56); New Haven, Connecticut, U.S.
- Occupation(s): Social worker, law enforcement official, criminal justice reformer

Helen Du Maresque Pigeon (January 28, 1889 – September 26, 1945) was an American social worker involved in law enforcement and criminal justice. She was executive secretary of the International Association of Policewomen in the 1920s. in the 1940s, she was executive secretary of the American Parole Association.

== Early life and education ==
Pigeon was born in Boston, the daughter of James Cogswell Du Maresque Pigeon and Emily A. Smith Pigeon. Her father was a physician. She graduated from Radcliffe College in 1912, and from the Simmons College of Social Work in 1917. She pursued further studies at Clark University, St. Elizabeths Hospital, and Yale University.

== Career ==
Pigeon worked for the United States Commission on Training Camp Activities, and the American Red Cross. After World War I, she headed the Girls' Welfare Society of Worcester, and worked as a probation officer. For the Pennsylvania Bureau of Corrections, she trained and supervised probation officers, and inspected correctional facilities. She also consulted for the Indiana Department of Public Welfare. She was a visiting instructor at George Washington University, the University of California, the University of Southern California, and the Pennsylvania State College.

Pigeon was based in Washington, D.C., in the 1920s, as executive secretary of the International Association of Policewomen, under the association's director, Mina Van Winkle. She edited the association's publication, The Policewoman.

Pigeon was interested in incorporating social work and mental health expertise into law enforcement and criminal justice work, especially in dealing with young offenders. She suggested that policewomen have special opportunities for investigation and surveillance, beyond those available to uniformed male officers. Emphasizing the value of prevention and intervention, she wrote in 1927 that "the proper diagnosis, advice based on scientific knowledge, or reference to a social agency for protection at a crucial moment may mean the difference between the sunlight of freedom or the shadow of high walls." She made several studies of juvenile offenders and children at risk. She testified before a 1926 Senate hearing, on law enforcement in Washington, D.C. During World War II, she worked on juvenile delinquency prevention, recommending comprehensive daycare, protective police services, and interagency collaboration to improve children's lives. She was executive secretary of the American Parole Association in her last years.

== Publications ==
- "Senate Bill 1750" (1926)
- "The Relation of the Juvenile Court to the Police" (1926)
- "Policewomen in the United States" (1927)
- The Elmwood Home for Boys, Erie, Pennsylvania (1938, report)
- "The Role of the Police in Crime Prevention" (1939)
- "In-Service Training for Probation and Parole Officers" (1941)
- Principles and Methods in Dealing with Offenders (1941, 1944, editor)
- The juvenile courts and probation services in the part of New Haven County comprising the third Congressional district (1941, report)
- Probation and Parole in Theory and Practice: A Study Manual (1942)
- "Effect of War Conditions On Children and Adolescents in the City of Hartford, Connecticut" (1944)

== Death ==
Pigeon died after a heart attack in 1945, at the age of 56, in New Haven, Connecticut.
