= Isabella Goodwin =

American police officer

Isabella Goodwin Seaholm
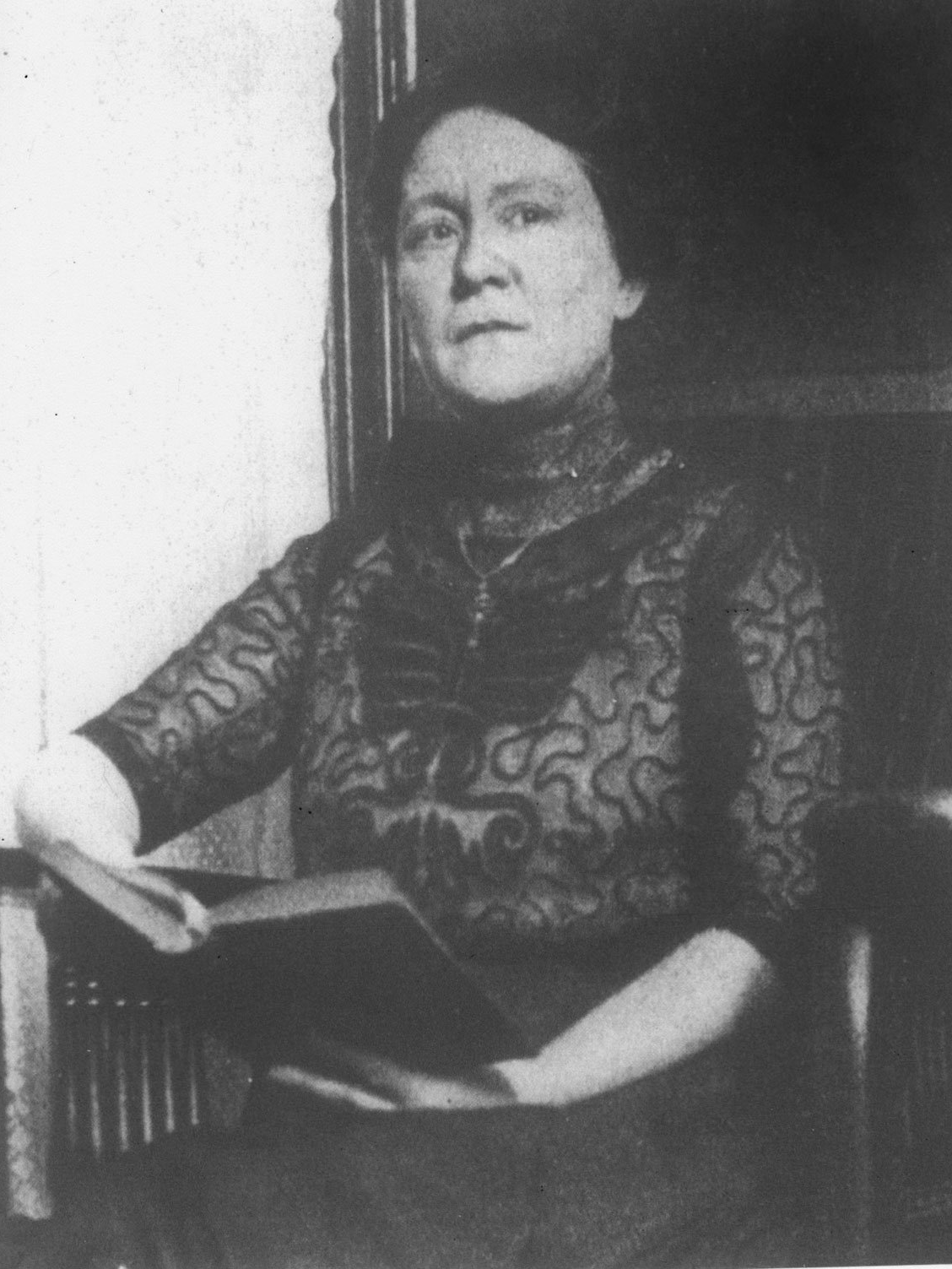
- Isabella Goodwin, c.1915
- Born: Isabella Loghry; February 20, 1865; Greenwich Village, New York City, U.S.
- Died: October 26, 1943 (aged 77–78); Westport, Connecticut, U.S.
- Burial place: Green-Wood Cemetery, Brooklyn
- Occupation: American police officer.
- Spouses: John W. Goodwin (m. 1884; died 1896); Oscar A. Seaholm (m. 1921)

Isabella Goodwin (née Loghry) was an American police officer and the first female detective in New York City.

== Biography ==
Isabella Loghry was born in Greenwich Village, Manhattan in 1865 to James Harvey Loghry and Anna J. Monteith, who ran a restaurant and hotel on Canal Street. Around 1885, aged 19, she married John W. Goodwin, a police officer. The couple had six children, of which four survived. Goodwin was widowed in 1896, when she was 30 years old.

The New York City police department had only started hiring women (“police matrons") to look after female and child prisoners in 1881. When Goodwin applied for a job after her husband died, she had to pass an exam then was hired as a jail matron by then police commissioner Theodore Roosevelt, who later became the president of the United States. It was a low paid position, making only $1000/year, and she only had one day off each month. She served in this position for 15 years. During this time, she began going undercover to investigate crimes, and her mother watched her children.

In 1912, there was a case involving a midday robbery where "taxi bandits" beat up two clerks and stole $25,000 in downtown Manhattan. Even with 60 detectives assigned to the case, no one could solve the robbery. The story was followed nationally, according to a New York Times article at the time. After going undercover, Goodwin cracked the case. As a result, she was appointed as New York's first female detective and given the rank of 1st grade lieutenant. Her salary was raised from $1000 to $2,250/year. During her career, she specialized in exposing fortune tellers and swindlers.

In 1921, she married a man who was thirty two years younger than her. She continued working after her marriage, which was not common at the time for a woman. When she retired, she had worked for the NYC police department for thirty years.

== In popular media ==
- The book The Fearless Mrs. Goodwin by Elizabeth Mitchell was based on Goodwin's life.
- In the television period drama series The Alienist, Dakota Fanning's character, Sara Howard, is also based on Goodwin's life.

== See also ==
- Mary Shanley - another woman NYPD detective
- Mary A. Sullivan - another woman NYPD detective who was head of the Policewomen's Bureau as well
