= Violence and intersectionality =

Oppression viewed from a feminist angle

Intersectionality is the interconnection of race, class, and gender. Violence and intersectionality connect during instances of discrimination and/or bias. Kimberlé Crenshaw, a feminist scholar, is widely known for developing the theory of intersectionality in her 1989 essay, "Demarginalizing the Intersection of Race and Sex: A Black Feminist Critique of Antidiscrimination Doctrine, Feminist Theory and Antiracist Politics". Crenshaw's analogy of intersectionality to the flow of traffic explains, "Discrimination, like traffic through an intersection, may flow in one direction, and it may flow in another. If an accident happens in an intersection, it can be caused by cars traveling from any number of directions and, sometimes, from all of them. Similarly, if a Black woman is harmed because she is in the intersection, her injury could result from sex discrimination or race discrimination."

Delia D. Aguilar writes that Intersectionality illuminates the "triple jeopardy" sociological barriers of racism, capitalism, and sexism that African American women experience.

Black women have been victims of violence and abuse since 1619 during the time of enslavement. The intersection of gender among enslaved women is an imperative factor of the different treatment they have experienced compared to enslaved males. In the 1960s, during the beginning of second-wave feminism finally addressed the voice of Black women and women of color in contrast to the first wave, where it initially focused on the struggles of white middle class women.

The stereotype as a justification for violence does not help this issue, either, as their bodies are viewed as sexual objects. For instance, their bodies are often objectified in an offensive sexual manner and degraded through song lyrics or television shows. This reinforces the ideology that the violence and abuse of women of color is justified.

"As knowledge of victimization trajectories develops, scholars have underscored the need to adopt an intersectional approach that considers how convergent social categories related to age, gender, race, class, and others shape victimization experiences."

== Violence and Intersectionality of Black Women in the U.S. ==
=== Gender and violence ===
Race and gender have consistently played a role in how Black women have historically experienced violence, and how they still continue to experience violence today. One of the earliest events in history in which this violence began was during slavery in 1619. During slavery, Black women, along with Black men, were kidnapped from African countries and brought to the United States for the purpose of producing lucrative products for the newly forming American economy. Some of these products included the production of tobacco and the production of cotton.

As slaves, Black men and women had no rights. By law, they were considered property and their white slave masters treated them as such. An example of their treatment was how white slave masters bought and sold slaves as commodity items, ripping families apart in the process. Another example of the treatment of slaves in America was the abuse and violence that they experienced. In order for slave masters to maintain power and control of their slaves, they repeatedly beat and abused them. This violence was used as a form of social control and also served to maintain white supremacy. The violence that female slave experienced differed from male slaves.

Black women were the targets of abuse by their white slave masters. African women were depicted as "oversexed by comparison with white women or as possessing excessively sexual bodies", a stereotype drawn on to justify the enslavement and abuse of Black women. Black women's abuse during slavery also brought about the social and political relationship between the slave, the slave master and the slave master's wife. An example of this relationship can be accounted from the well known narrative of Harriet Ann Jacobs and her experience as a Black woman during slavery. Jacobs was not only the subject of abuse by her abusive and abhorrent slave master, she was also the subject of abuse by her slave master's wife due to jealousy and blame that her slave master's wife attributed to her. Jacobs' account of her abuse offers one of the earliest instances of a Black woman's epistemology in America; it also indicates early histories of how Black women's lives revealed the makings of today's theories called intersectionality.

The idea that multiple oppressions reinforce each other to create new categories of suffering was created by the Combahee River Collective, a radical Black feminist organization formed in 1974 and named after Harriet Tubman's 1863 raid on the Combahee River in South Carolina that freed 750 enslaved people (K. Y. Taylor, 2019). Later, the term and the analysis that articulates and animates the meaning of intersectionality was conceptualized by second- and third-wave feminists (Crenshaw, 1991; K. Y. Taylor, 2019).

=== Black Women and the Impact of Second Wave Feminism ===
In the 1960s and 1970s, during the second wave feminist movement, Black women and other women of color were beginning to organize and discuss the ways in which they would be able to bring their concerns into the forefront of feminism because their issues were not being addressed in the main discourse of feminism. Previously, a lot of the concerns that white women in the nineteenth century addressed were issues that only white middle class women faced. This placed white women in the feminist movement as privileged individuals in comparison to other women who were poor, working class women of color. This was one of the foundations of the feminist movement, which began to trickle down into the second wave feminist movement.

In the twentieth century, feminist scholars such as Anna Julia Cooper and Ida B. Wells-Barnett began to engage in a discussion how white people and white feminists excluded the plight of African-Americans in this country. They began to integrate race, class, and gender into the main discourse of feminism. Their analyses included pointing out the differences between race, class, and gender and a calling to other feminists to take up the plight of marginalized groups of people. As such, intersectional theories have been created with the intention of interrogating these oppressions and working towards expanding the feminist movement to include everyone.

=== Intersectional Theories ===
Intersectional theories looks at how race, class, sexuality and gender inform discourses of feminism and feminist thought. "Rather than viewing separate oppressions as distinct categories, 'intersectionality describes a more fluid, mutually constrictive process' whereby every social act is imbricated by gender, race, class, and sexuality."

=== Examples of Intersectional Theories ===
Feminist scholars such as Kimberlé Crenshaw, Audre Lorde, and Claudia Rankine, and many others have looked at violence done to African American women from a theoretical stand point in order to understand why Black women are more likely to be abused. The purpose of this is to find solutions as to how Black women can be better protected when instances of violence and abuse take place. Feminist theorists also introduce new theoretical frameworks in order to continue the dialogue about the violence done to Black women.

==== Kimberlé Crenshaw ====
Kimberlé Crenshaw is a civil rights activist and a scholar in race theory. Crenshaw coined the term intersectionality in 1989, in order to interrogate the ways in which black women and women of color are often excluded from the main narrative of feminist thought and ideology. Through her writings, Crenshaw analyzes the ways in which Black women and women of color experience violence and abuse and interrogates that by employing intersectionality and the effects it has on black female experience. Crenshaw argues that race, class and gender need to be an essential part of the feminist discourse, especially when talking about violence experienced by Black women. Crenshaw argues that failure to do this will continue to reinforce systems of oppression and violence that black women face.

She writes,

"The failure of feminism to interrogate race means that the resistance strategies of feminism will often replicate and reinforce the subordination of people of color, and the failure of antiracism interrogate patriarchy means that antiracism will frequently reproduce the subordination of women.These mutual elisions present a particularly difficult political dilemma for women of color. Adopting either analysis constitutes a denial of a fundamental dimension of our subordination and precluded the development of a political discourse that more fully empowers women of color".

==== Audre Lorde ====
Audre Lorde is an African American writer, feminist, lesbian, and activist, who speaks and writes about inequalities and injustice that women of color face, which are expressed through her works. In one of her most notable works, entitled The Master's Tools Will Never Dismantle the Masters House, Lorde addresses the importance of intersectionality in feminism. She argues that the exclusion of other stories that intersect with race, class, and gender, will continue to oppress and silence, especially when instances of violence occur. Lorde suggests that the "Master's tools", which refers to the systemic oppression of Black people and white supremacy in America, has been created for the benefit of white people. Lorde suggests that this is one of the main reasons for the need of intersectionality in feminist theory.

In an example, she describes how white women cannot understand the full implications of racism that black women experience. She asks, "What is the theory behind racist feminism?" Lorde argues for the importance of Black women to have the space necessary for them to participate in a feminist movement that does not further marginalize them. To simply ignore this issue would be to perpetuate racist social ideologies that have been ingrained into American society.

==== Claudia Rankine ====
Claudia Rankine is a Jamaican poet, writer and essayist who is the author of many important works pertinent to racism and feminism. In one of her most recent books entitled, "Citizen", Rankine uses the lyric essay as a way to describe an example of the Black female experience in America.

In one of her pieces she writes,

"Because of your elite status from a year's worth of travel, you have already settled into your window seat on United Airlines, when the girl and her mother arrive at your row. The girl, looking over at you, tell her mother, these are our seats, but this is not what I expected. The mother's response is barely audible – I see, she says. I'll sit in the middle".

Rankine's account of this specific encounter is an example of how the Black female experience can be used to inform how we look at feminist discourse. The described interaction above is an example of how Black women are looked at and treated by other people.

=== Intersectional Theories in Relation to Violence Against Black Women ===
Since Kimberlé Crenshaw introduced the term intersectionality in 1989, violence against Black women has been used as a way to look at how race, class and gender all impact the experience of the Black woman. This was one of the ways in which intersectionality has been used by theorists and activists to engage in the anti-violence movement against women. Women such as Crenshaw and Angela Davis critique how the anti-violence movement against women of focused on "the kind of gendered violence that white, middle class women predominately face, the experience of 'otherwise -privileged members of the group'.

This critique was formed in three ways:

1. Violence that women of color experience becomes significantly worse due to race and class difference.

This is because of the lack of resources that poor Black women have limited access to that may help remove them from these dangerous situations. These resources include, lack of financial means, responsibility of children, employment discrimination, and many others. These are intrinsic with the racism that Black women experience, which further marginalizes them.

2. Women of color also disproportionally experience violence reinforced by government officials which are supposed to serve and protect the public.

Black women face higher forms of physical violence in institutions such as the American prison system, and within law enforcement. In the prison system, Black women are incarcerated at a much higher rate than women of any other ethnic group, and therefore policed more often. As such, they are more likely to experience violence and abuse within the prison system. Some examples of abuse include, strip body searches, sexual abuse from guards and or managers, and abuse from inmates.

3. Black women have been placed outside the protection of the law, when it comes to instances of violence and abuse that Black women experience.

== Black Women and Violence Today ==
=== Current statistics ===
"Black women experience especially high rates of chronic victimization that decreases over time, whereas persistent, low-level victimization is a unique classification among White women."

Within the last twenty years, domestic violence has remained a prevalent issue that many women of African American women faced with in their communities. The Institute on Domestic Violence in the African American community reports:

- "Black women comprise 8% of the US population but in 2005 accounted for 22% of the intimate partner homicide victims and 29% of all female victims of intimate partner homicide".
- "In a nationally representative survey conducted in 1996, 29% of African American women and 12% of African American men reported at least one instance of violence from an intimate partner".
- "African Americans account for a disproportionate number of intimate partner homicides. In 2005, African Americans almost accounted for 1/3 of the intimate partner homicides in this country".

The Women of Color Facts and Stats also reports:

- "For every African American/ Black woman that reports her rape, at least 15 African American/ Black woman do not report theirs".
- "Approximately 40% of Black women report coercive contact of a sexual nature by age 18".
- "The National Violence Against Women Survey (NVAWAS) found that 18.8% of African American women reported rape in their lifetime".

The Center of Disease Control MMWR reports:

- Approximately 8.8% of non-Hispanic Black women from a national sample sustained a rape by an intimate partner at least one time in their life.
- Approximately 17.4% of non-Hispanic Black women from a national sample encountered other forms of sexual violence by an intimate partner at least one time in their life.
- Approximately 41.2% of non-Hispanic Black women from a national sample were met with physical violence by an intimate partner at least one time in their life.
- Approximately 9.5% of non-Hispanic Black women from a national sample were stalked by an intimate partner at least one time in their life.

=== Stereotypes as a Justification For Violence ===
Black women are also the subjects of stereotypes that lead to higher rates of victimization. This is entrenched within American culture, in forms of media and institutions. For example, genres of music such as Hip-Hop, Rap, and R&B, which dominate American culture, in which some genres refer to women in very harsh and degrading ways.

Collins's (2002) conceptualization of controlling images highlights the ways in which biological determinism and oppression serve to justify the subordination of African American women. Throughout history, there have been three ubiquitous stereotypical images associated with African American women: the Jezebel, the Mammy, and the Sapphire/Matriarch. These stereotypes have served to justify their sexual and economic exploitation. They are grossly oversimplified fabrications that perpetuate and rationalize ongoing disparities and a failure to develop appropriate policy responses to their abuse and mistreatment (Collins, 1999).

== Black Women, Violence and the ERA ==
One of the most important documents that has been brought before legislation is The Equal Rights Amendment, which was originally drafted by Alice Paul in 1923. It reads as follows:

"Section 1. Equality under the law shall not be denied or abridged because of sex.

Section 2. The congress shall have the power to enforce the provisions of the amendment.

Section 3. This amendment shall take effect two years after its ratification."

The ERA was brought to Congress in 1972, where it was passed under condition that within seven years, three-fourths of the states needed to vote in order for it to be ratified into the Constitution. In 1982, after a three-year extension, the ERA was not passed, just falling short of only three votes needed.

== Intersectionality of Sexual Violence ==
Sexual Violence is Intersectional as experiences with rape and all manners of sexual assault vary along lines race/ethnicity, class, sexuality, age, ability status, citizenship status, and nationality and gender.

=== Sexual Violence, Race, and Nationality ===
Sexual Violence was used as a tool of white domination during the time of US American chattel slavery and through the period of emancipation, in early-twentieth-century northern migrations, the civil rights movement, and continues today in the 21st century.

Men who rape black women are less likely to be charged and/or convicted compared to men who rape white women. Black prisoners serving time for sexual assault are more likely to be innocent than their white counterparts.

In the USA black and native women are at higher risk for sexual violence.

Sexual violence is commonly experienced by migrants. There are documented cases of rape and sexual violence against migrants perpetrated by Immigration and Naturalization Service (INS) officials or Border Patrol agents at the Mexico US border. The Intersectional aspects of migration and sexual violence continue after migration as undocumented women may not report sexual violence due to fear of immigration authorities.

Sexual Violence and Age

Late adolescent boys and girls are at elevated risk for sexual violence compared to adults. For females especially, risk of sexual assault is concentrated in late adolescence

Sexual Violence and Class

Sexual violence is more prevalent among women who earn less than $25,000 per year, those who are unable to work, those who live in rural areas, and women who did not attend college.

Sexual Violence and Sexuality

Lesbian, gay, bisexual, transgender, and queer (LGBTQ) individuals experience higher rates of Intimate partner violence and sexual violence. Domestic violence between same sex couples is taken less seriously by crisis center staff.
