= Georgia Ann Robinson =

American police officer (1879–1961)

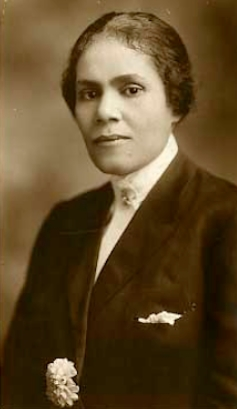
- Born: Georgia Ann Hill; May 12, 1879; Opelousas, Louisiana, United States
- Died: September 21, 1961 (aged 82); Los Angeles, California, United States
- Occupations: Police officer; Community worker
- Known for: First African-American woman police officer at the LAPD
- Notable work: Founded a shelter for women and girls (Sojourner Truth Home)

Georgia Ann Robinson (née Hill; May 12, 1879 – September 21, 1961) was an American police officer and community worker who was the first African American woman to be appointed a police officer at the Los Angeles Police Department (LAPD); she was also one of the first Black policewomen to be hired in the country. She joined the force in 1916 as a volunteer jail matron and was appointed an officer in 1919. She worked on juvenile and homicide cases, as well as cases with black women. She often referred the people she came in contact with to social agencies. Her police career ended when she permanently lost her sight after being injured by a prisoner. Robinson was also an activist who founded the Sojourner Truth Home, a shelter for women and girls, while working on the force. After retiring, Robinson continued her community activism, working with the NAACP, volunteering in shelters, and campaigning to desegregate schools and beaches. She was married to Morgan Robinson, and had a daughter, Marian. She died in Los Angeles at the age of 82.

== Early life ==
Georgia Ann Hill was born in Opelousas, Louisiana, on 12 May 1879. She was brought up first by an older sister, then in a convent. She moved to Kansas when she was 18, working as a governess. She married Morgan Robinson there, and the couple moved to Colorado, and then to Los Angeles.

== Career ==
In 1916, when the Los Angeles Police Department (LAPD) was facing a shortage of officers after many enlisted to fight in World War I, Robinson was recruited to leave her community work to join LAPD as a volunteer. She worked as a jail matron for three years.

Around this time, African American club women were working to get black women hired by the police. Organizations like the National Association of Colored Women's Clubs believed having black female police officers would both protect black women and girls from white male violence and would help combat harmful stereotypes about black women being more sexually active/available.

There were strict requirements for becoming a policewoman, such as being between age 30–44, being married, and holding a degree in education or nursing. Robinson was thirty-six years old, married, and had a degree in nursing, so she met all these requirements. On 10 June 1919, Robinson was officially sworn in as a policewoman. Robinson was the first Black woman to be sworn into the LAPD, and one of the first African American policewomen in the country. Robinson worked with the first white female policewoman, Alice Stebbins Wells.

The LAPD saw the hiring of black women as a type of police reform, because they could deal with black female offenders. Thus, Robinson primarily worked on juvenile and homicide cases, as well as cases involving black women. Instead of arresting the women and girls she came in contact with, Robinson often sent them to social services. This was an early attempt at police reform, and one of the first times the LAPD sought to help the black community. Robinson often allowed youth she met on the job to temporarily stay at her own home when they had nowhere else to go.

Though juvenile cases were her specialty, Robinson dealt with any situation she encountered on the job. When there was a car crash on 18 September 1918, Robinson rescued two injured women and sent them to the hospital for treatment. Over the course of her career she also administered first aid to a juror who collapsed in court, rescued kidnapped babies, and searched for kidnapped girls.

As an official policewoman, Robinson was paid for her work. However, she was not given a gun, handcuffs, or a police car. Nevertheless, she still succeeded in taking people to jail when the need arose.

Robinson's police career was cut short in 1928, when a prisoner banged her head into jail bars, causing a head injury so severe that she permanently lost her sight. Twelve years after she began her career with the LAPD, Robinson retired.

I have no regrets. I didn't need my eyes any longer. I had seen all there was to see.

— Georgia Robinson, 1954

== Activism ==
Robinson was involved in activism throughout her life. As a young woman in Colorado, she was an active suffragist. In LA, Robinson was the first treasurer of the local National Association for the Advancement of Colored People (NAACP) chapter. She also helped found the Sojourner Truth Home, which focused on helping new black, female LA residents create strong connections in the city, and volunteered with the Eastside Shelter for Women and Girls.

Robinson single-handedly desegregated her daughter's high school graduation, ensuring the black students could participate in the ceremony equally with the white students. Robinson also worked with H. Claude Hudson to desegregate Venice Beach by trying to put an end to “The Ink Spot,” the black section of the beach.

== Personal life ==
She married Morgan Robinson in Kansas two weeks after they met. In 1906, Robinson gave birth to their daughter, Marian. She is said to have often brought underprivileged women and children home with her for dinner. Robinson was interviewed by Ebony Magazine in 1954. She died in Los Angeles on 21 September 1961.
