= Bourne, Oregon =

Unincorporated community in the state of Oregon, United States

- Former unincorporated community
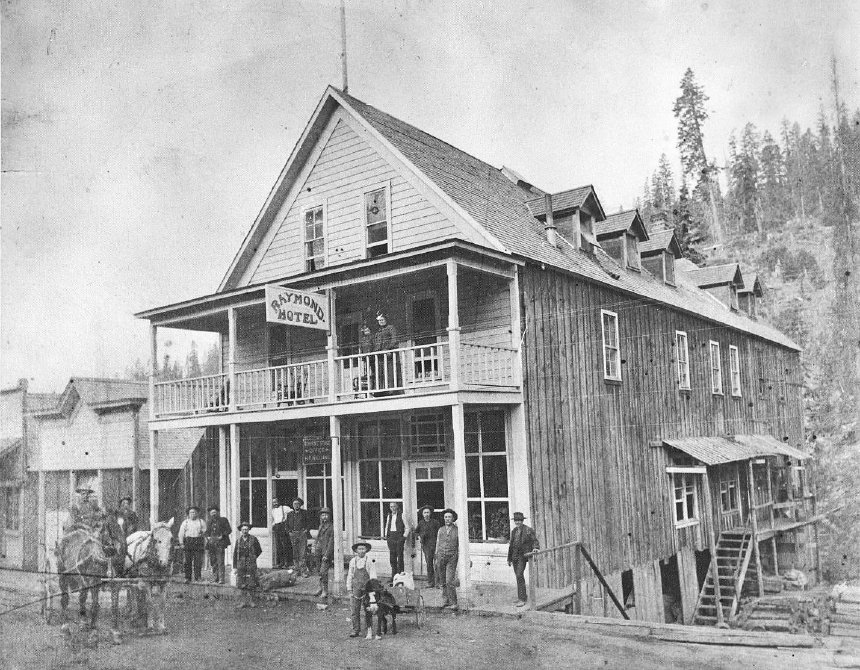
- Raymond Hotel in Bourne

- Location within Oregon Location within the United States
- Coordinates: 44°49′28″N 118°11′51″W
- Country: United States
- State: Oregon
- County: Baker
- Elevation: 5,374 ft (1,638 m)
- Time zone: UTC-8 (Pacific (PST))
  - Summer (DST): UTC-7 (PDT)
- Area codes: 458 and 541
- GNIS feature ID: 1136088

Bourne is a ghost town in Baker County, Oregon, United States about 7 miles (11 km) north of Sumpter in the Blue Mountains. It lies on Cracker Creek and is within the Wallowa–Whitman National Forest. Platted in 1902, the former gold mining boomtown is considered a ghost town today.

Originally named "Cracker City", Bourne is named after Senator Jonathan Bourne, Jr., who was interested in Eastern Oregon mines for a time. Bourne post office was established in 1895 and closed in 1927.

In 1910 Bourne town was listed as having a population of 77.

== See also ==
- List of ghost towns in Oregon
