= Marie Owens =

Early US female police officer (1853-1927)

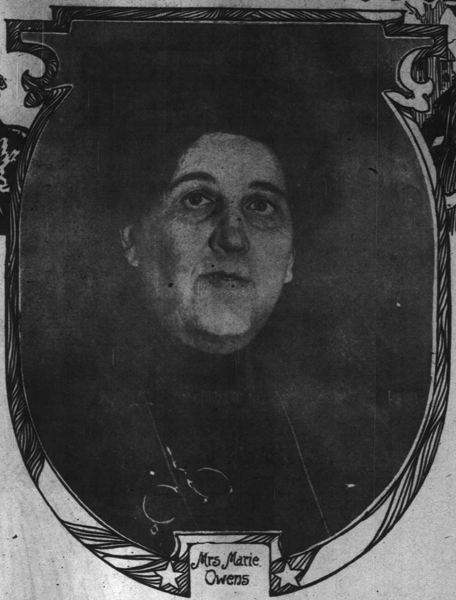
- Chicago Police Department, Officer Marie Owens, photograph portrait, from the Chicago-Daily Tribune newspaper, October 28, 1906
- Born: Marie Connolly; December 21, 1853; Ottawa, British Canada now Ottawa, Ontario, Canada
- Died: June 1927 (aged 73); New York City, New York, U.S.
- Resting place: Calvary Cemetery
- Other names: Mrs. Marie Owens; Sergeant No. 97
- Occupation: Police officer
- Known for: First female police officer, in the U.S. and the first female police officer in the Chicago Police Department, in 1891
- Spouse: Thomas Owens (d. 1888)

Marie Owens (December 21, 1853 – June 1927; born Marie Connolly aka Marie Connolly Owens) is believed to have been the first female police officer in the U.S. and the first female police officer in the Chicago Police Department, in 1891, retiring in 1923. Holding the rank of Sergeant, Owens enforced child labor and welfare laws. She was born and raised in Ottawa, Ontario, Canada, the daughter of Irish immigrants.

== Career ==
Prior to working with the police, she was one of five female health inspectors employed in the city health department in 1889. When employed with police she reported to Capt. O’Brien. In 1901 the Chicago Tribune described her position: "So Mrs. Marie Owens became 'Sergeant No. 97,' with the salary, star, and rating of a special police officer ... All over the city does this work take 'Sergeant No. 97'; from all parts of the working world come requests for her assistance, complaints for her investigation ... 'Sergeant No. 97' never invokes the string arm that is back of her unless all gentler methods have been proved inefficient ... in all her fifteen years of police experience never has 'Sergeant No. 97' found it necessary to come to a direct clash with an employer; never yet has she made an enemy of a child or parent."

== Personal life ==
She had a younger brother named Brendan who was born when she was seven years old.

She married Thomas Owens in 1879 when she was approximately 26 years old.

While Marie was still in her twenties, she and her husband Thomas moved to Chicago. He died of typhoid in February 1888 when Marie was approximately 35 years old. She was left alone to raise five children.

Marie named her first son after Charles Stewart Parnell.

She had a daughter who she went to live with when she retired.

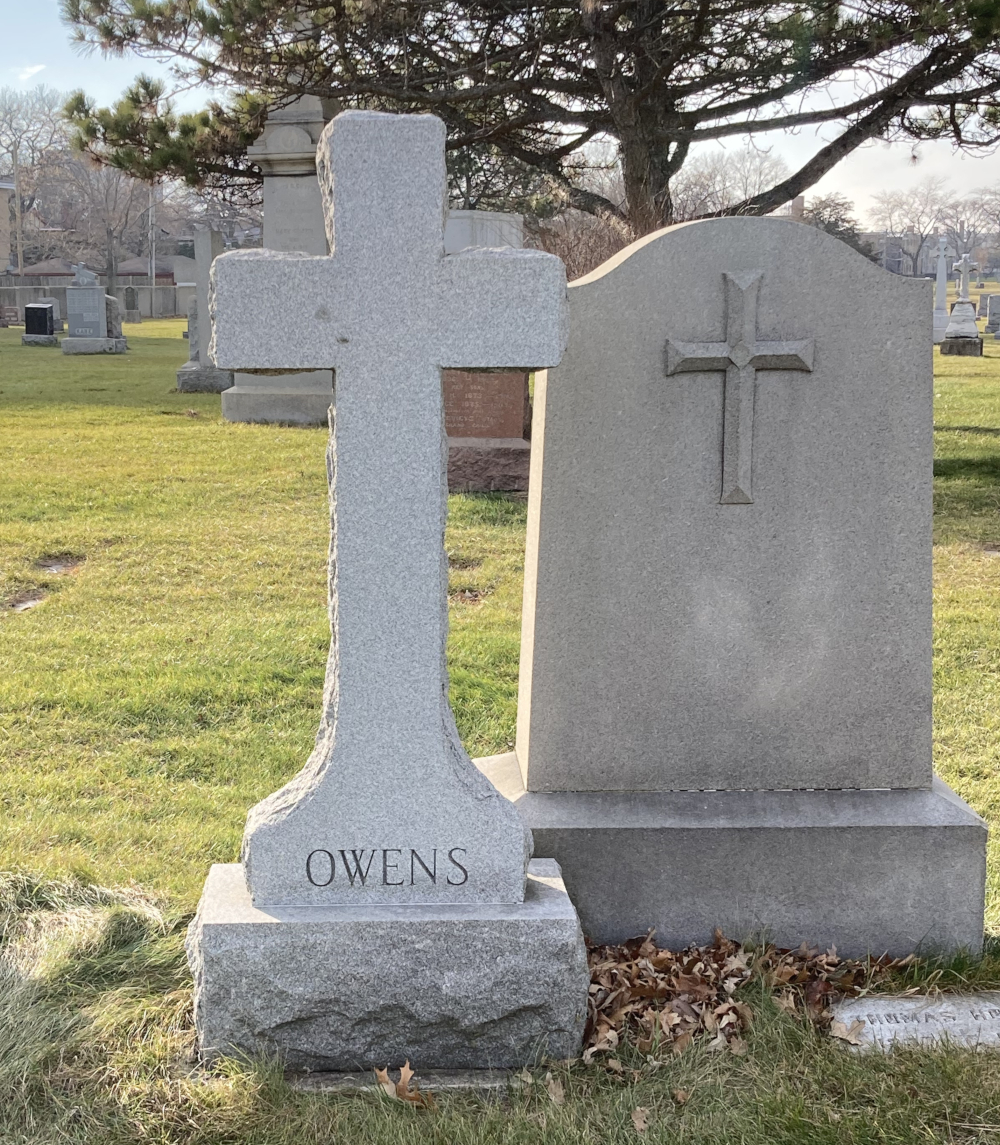
Owens' grave at Calvary Cemetery

Marie Owens died in New York City in June 1927, and was buried at Calvary Cemetery in Evanston, Illinois.

== See also ==
- Alice Stebbins Wells
- Lola Baldwin
