= Lola Baldwin =

Policewoman in Portland, Oregon, US (1860–1957)

Lola Greene Baldwin
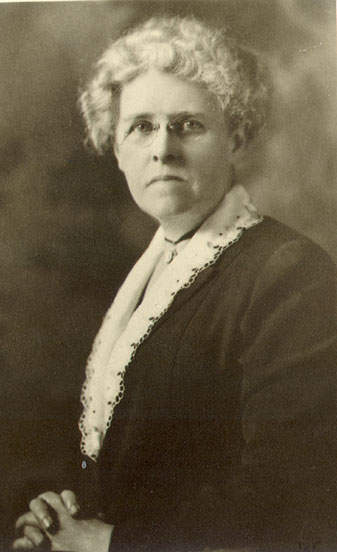
- Lola Baldwin in 1915
- Born: Aurora Greene; 1860; Elmira, New York
- Died: June 22, 1957 (aged 97); Portland, Oregon
- Resting place: River View Cemetery
- Occupation: Police officer
- Employer: City of Portland
- Title: Superintendent of the Women's Protective Division
- Spouse: LeGrand M. Baldwin
- Children: Myron, Pierre

Aurora "Lola" Greene Baldwin (1860 – June 22, 1957) was an American woman who became one of the first policewomen in the United States. In 1908, she was sworn in by the City of Portland as Superintendent of the Women's Auxiliary to the Police Department for the Protection of Girls (later renamed the Women's Protective Division), with the rank of detective.

Baldwin grew up in Rochester, New York, and taught in nearby public schools. She relocated to Lincoln, Nebraska, where she taught, then married. She, her husband, and their two sons later lived in several U.S. cities, where Baldwin engaged in volunteer social work related to unwed mothers and other young women in trouble. In 1904, when Baldwin was 44, the family moved to Portland, where her husband continued his dry goods career.

Women's groups such as the Travelers Aid Society, concerned that the Lewis and Clark Centennial Exposition, scheduled for 1905 in Portland, posed a danger to single women working at the fair, hired Baldwin to supervise a project to protect girls and women. Success at the fair led to similar work thereafter, and eventually to her hiring in 1908 as a police officer. Throughout her policing career, Baldwin stressed crime prevention and favored reform over incarceration. She promoted laws to protect women, advised other jurisdictions about women's law-enforcement issues, and demonstrated by example that women could be effective police officers. After her retirement from the police in 1922, she gave public lectures for the Oregon Social Hygiene Society and served on the board of the Hillcrest School of Oregon, the Oregon Parole Board, and the National Committee on Prisons and Prison Labor. Baldwin, sometimes referred to as a "municipal mother", died in Portland on June 22, 1957, at the age of 97.

== Early life ==
Born Aurora "Lola" Greene in 1860, in Elmira, New York, Baldwin grew up largely in Rochester, where her family moved when she was quite young. Her parents, of Irish Protestant heritage, enrolled her in the city's Christ Church Episcopal School for Girls, and she later attended Rochester High School. When her father died in 1877, she was forced to withdraw from school and seek work, finishing her high school studies on her own. She passed the New York State qualifying exam for teachers, and taught near Rochester until 1880 when she moved alone to Lincoln, Nebraska, a city that was seeking teachers. After passing the Nebraska qualifying exam, she taught for three years at Lincoln Preparatory High School.

By 1884, she had met and married LeGrand M. Baldwin, a dry goods merchant originally from Vermont. As was expected then of single women teachers who married, Baldwin resigned her job at the high school. During her remaining years in Lincoln, she found paid clerical work, and volunteered as a social worker focused on helping "wayward" girls. She also gave birth to two sons, Myron and Pierre.

After they left Lincoln in 1893, over the next 10 years the Baldwins lived variously in Boston, Yonkers, Norfolk, and Providence, Rhode Island, as LeGrand pursued his dry goods career. He eventually joined E. P. Charlton & Company, which had a chain of more than 50 stores across the United States. In each city the family moved to, Baldwin continued her volunteer work, including serving on the boards of two Florence Crittenton Homes. They were part of a national network of rescue homes for "unfortunate lost girls", which at the time meant rescued prostitutes and unwed mothers. (Note: Founded by wealthy druggist Charles N. Crittenton, the first home opened in New York City in 1883. In 1894, Crittenton and Kate Waller Barrett, a physician, set up the national Florence Crittenton Mission in Washington, D.C. They helped establish more than 70 Crittenton homes across the United States. In the 21st century, the National Crittenton Foundation, based in Portland, Oregon, is "an advocacy and support group for young women on the margins, most of whom have been victims of abuse, violence or neglect.") In 1904, the Charlton Company sent LeGrand to Portland to open its first store in the Pacific Northwest. Baldwin worked in the store's business office and joined the board of the city's Florence Crittenton Home.

== Lewis and Clark Exposition ==
In 1904, Portland officials were preparing for the 1905 Lewis and Clark Centennial Exposition. Among their concerns was a possible influx of non-resident criminals to the city. Officials feared some would target young women and girls, and lure or coerce them into sexual activity, including prostitution. As part of the exposition preparations, women's groups, including the Travelers Aid Society, the YWCA, and many local secular and religious organizations, made plans to prevent the sexual exploitation of young women during the fair.

The Portland YWCA hired Baldwin as project supervisor with funds provided partly by the national Travelers Aid committee. She and her associates compiled lists of local lodging and working places they deemed safe for young women. When the exposition opened on June 1, 1905, volunteers met young women at Union Station and other entry points to the city and offered advice about lodging and employment, and in some cases other aid such as meal vouchers. Volunteers patrolled the exposition, especially venues such as risque sideshows, dimly lit structures, the beer garden, and the shooting gallery (carnival game), all of which they considered sexually dangerous. In her final report on the exposition, Baldwin reported that Travelers Aid had helped 1,640 women and girls in various ways, including finding safe jobs for more than 500.

After the fair ended, Baldwin retained a position with the local Travelers Aid branch, based at the YWCA. Over the next three years, she continued the kinds of work she had done during the exposition, often helping runaways and young women with legal troubles. Supported by Mayor Harry Lane and the Portland police, she eventually convinced the City Council to create and fund what was formally named the Women's Auxiliary to the Police Department for the Protection of Girls, later renamed the Women's Protective Division (WPD). On April 1, 1908, she was sworn in as superintendent of the auxiliary with the rank of detective.

Depending on the definition of "policewoman", Baldwin was the first except for Marie Owens, thought to have begun her policing career in Chicago in 1891. Another candidate for the title of "first" is Alice Stebbins Wells, who joined the Los Angeles Police Department in 1910. All three specialized in law enforcement related to women and children. Louise Bryant, writing about Baldwin for Sunset magazine in 1912, described her as a "municipal mother".

== Women's Protective Division superintendent: 1908–22 ==
Baldwin's police work, centering on the protection of women, continued through 1922. It took various forms, such as lobbying for laws to protect women, urging state officials to open a home for troubled women, and advising other states and cities on women's law-enforcement issues. Through her accomplishments, she demonstrated that women could be effective police officers.

The social hygiene movement as well as the social purity movement, which sought to maintain traditional 19th-century Victorian morality through the Progressive Era, were major influences on Baldwin's work. At the turn of the century Portland was "rampant with vice and corruption". An elaborate system supported the business of prostitution, which flourished in brothels, hotels, rooming houses, saloons, and other places, especially in the red-light district north of Burnside Street in the central city. Baldwin was one of 15 commissioners appointed to the Portland Vice Commission in 1911 to study the problem of venereal disease (VD) and its relation to the commercial sex trade. The commission estimated that nearly 25 percent of the cases being seen by the city's physicians involved VD. A commission review of 547 Portland establishments thought to harbor prostitutes confirmed that 431 supported acts that were "immoral". Another commission study conducted between mid-1911 and late 1912 found that police had raided 216 vice establishments and made 1,900 prostitution arrests during the prior 18 months. Baldwin and other city officials worked in many ways to reduce the personal and social dangers related to commercial sex:

The goal was to cleanse and uplift the evil city, and make it morally and physically safe for families, single working women, and children. Advocates believed that the police power should be utilized to attack a broad range of concerns. Under pressure from social hygienists, many of whom were physicians, municipalities initiated sanitation and public health programs, venereal disease control, vice and prostitution abatement, commercial amusement reform, and other correctives for situations perceived as dangerous to the public welfare.

Targets for elimination from the city included "any business that exploited young women". During the years that Baldwin led the WPD, this included not only brothels but also fortune-telling establishments, massage parlors, shooting galleries, and dance halls. Preferring prevention to jail time for young women, Baldwin helped single mothers connect to social services, persuaded city officials to keep women out of saloons, and established an after-care system for delinquent girls.

== Later life ==
Troubled by changing cultural norms after World War I, Baldwin retired from the police force in 1922. In her 1921 annual report, she expressed dismay at what she viewed as a general lowering of moral standards. She said this was evidenced by such things as tobacco smoking by women, increased juvenile delinquency, and the rise of the flapper "bad girl" mode of dress and behavior.

After her official retirement at age 62, Baldwin continued to lecture on venereal disease and vice for the Oregon Social Hygiene Society, served on the board of the Hillcrest School of Oregon, traveled to other cities to encourage formation of women's police divisions, served on the Oregon Parole Board as well as the National Committee on Prisons and Prison Labor, and continued to support the Women's Protective Division of the Portland police.

During her retirement, she also assisted her husband and sons in running a bakery. LeGrand Baldwin died in 1941; Lola Baldwin died in 1957, at the age of 97. One hundred years after Baldwin became a policewoman, Portland Mayor Tom Potter proclaimed April 1, 2008, to be Lola Greene Baldwin Centennial Day in honor of her achievements.

== See also ==
- Lola's Room
- Penny Harrington, first female chief of the Portland Police Bureau
- Sybil Plumlee, police officer who served in the Women's Protective Division from 1947 to 1967
