= Alice Stebbins Wells =

First American policewoman (1873–1957)

Alice S. Wells
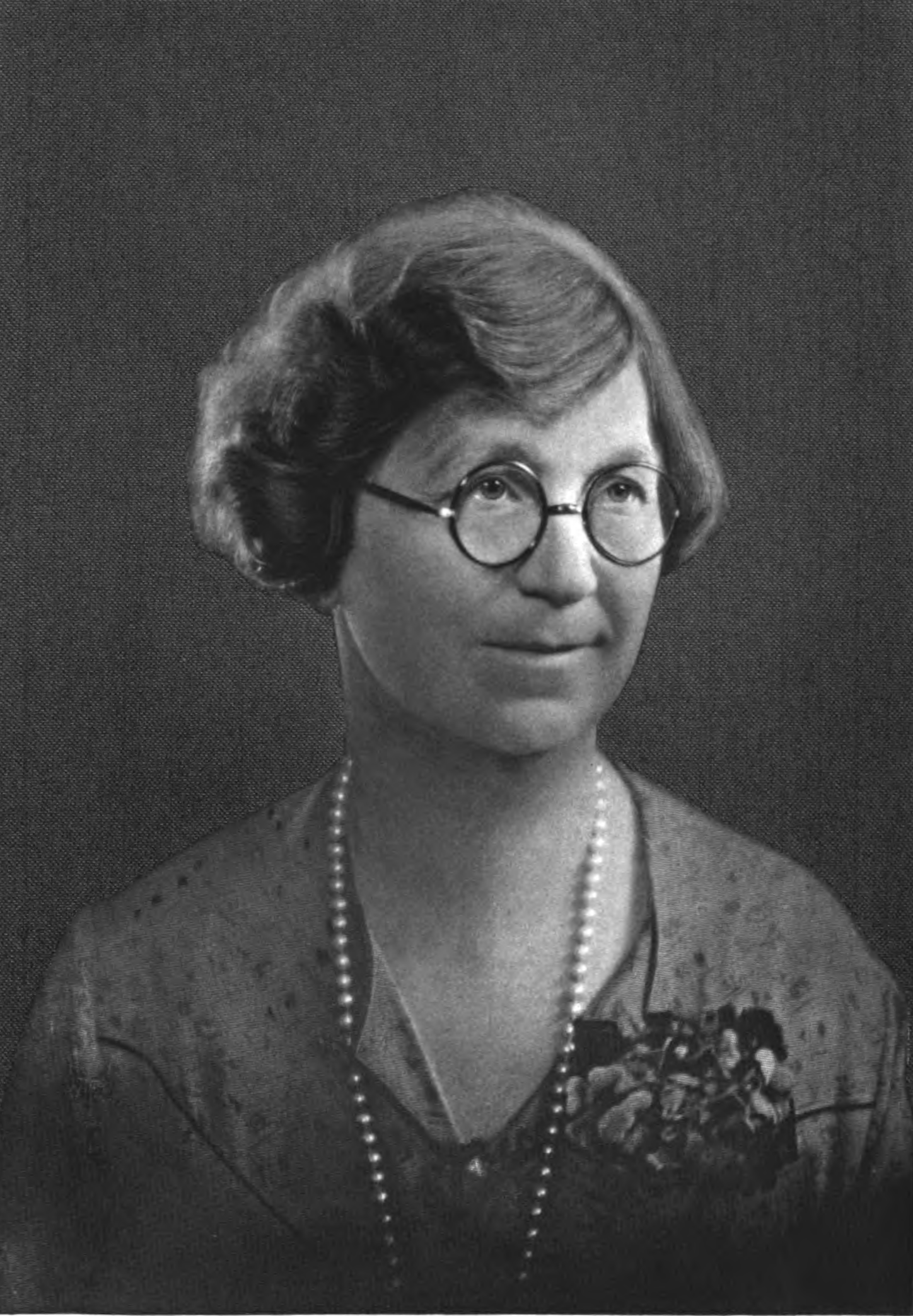
- Wells in 1936
- Born: June 13, 1873; Manhattan, Kansas, United States
- Died: August 17, 1957 (aged 84)
- Police career
- Country: United States
- Department: Los Angeles Police Department
- Service years: 1910–1940
- Rank: Sworn in as an officer – 1910; Sergeant – 1934
- Other work: Official LAPD historian, speaker

Alice Stebbins Wells (June 13, 1873 – August 17, 1957) was one of the first American-born female police officers in the United States, hired in 1910 in Los Angeles.

== Career ==
=== Early career ===
Alice was a graduate of Oberlin College (Note: Alice's name does not appear in the historical list of graduates published by Oberlin College in 1908. Alice's parents Homer Pease Stebbins and Alice (Kinney) Stebbins were both Oberlin graduates, in the Classes of 1859 and 1861 respectively.) and Hartford Theological Seminary, where a study she conducted concluded there was a large need for woman officers. She also previously served as a minister in Kansas and a member of the Women's Christian Temperance Union. Wells joined the Los Angeles Police Department after a long battle of petitioning with many citizens who supported her or that she persuaded. With such a huge community reaction the mayor, police commissioner, and the Los Angeles city council had no other excuse but to let Alice become the first policewoman in the LAPD and was classified under civil service. Wells went on to become the founder and first president of the International Policewomen's Association and traveled throughout America and Canada to promote female officers.

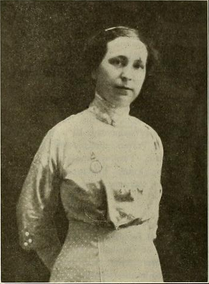
Wells in 1912

Since 1891, law enforcement agencies had employed women only for the care of female prisoners. After Wells successfully petitioned for a place on the LAPD and was sworn in on September 12, 1910, she was hired and equipped with a telephone call box key, a police rule book and first aid book, and the "Policewoman's Badge Number One". Wells was responsible for hand sewing her own police uniform, which was the first police woman's uniform in the United States. It was a floor-length dress and jacket, khaki in color. A reproduction of this very outfit is on display at The Los Angeles Police Historical Society Museum. Wells was assigned to work with the LAPD's first juvenile officer, and was quickly the subject of an order issued by the force that ruled that young women could now only be questioned by female police officers. Wells began her career supervising skating rinks and dance halls, as well as interacting with female members of the public. In addition, although Wells was a sworn officer she was not entitled to carry a gun, unlike male officers. Two years after Wells joined the force, two other female officers were sworn in, with all female officers now under the control of the Civil Service. Sixteen other cities and several foreign countries hired female police officers as a direct result of Wells' activities by 1915, when Wells created the International Policewomen's Association. Nine years after Wells was hired, the LAPD had hired four other white policewomen, and swore in Georgia Ann Robinson, the first African American policewoman hired by the LAPD. Wells always advocated for more women officers to help youth in need and women who might not feel comfort in speaking to policemen. Wells also founded, and was the president of, the Los Angeles Social Hygiene Society where she supported sex education in the city of Los Angeles.

=== Contribution to modern female policing ===
Due to Wells's advocacy for women's and children's rights, more women were recruited after the Equal Employment Opportunity Act of 1972 to undertake community policing assignments. This is due in part because policewomen were thought to be better at defusing potentially violent situations than policemen.

=== Nationwide publicity and retirement ===
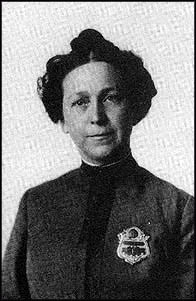
Wells' LAPD photo

The appointment of Wells attracted nationwide attention. In 1914, she was the subject of a biographical film entitled The Policewoman. The University of California created the first course dedicated to the work of female police officers in 1918, and Wells was made the first president of the Women's Peace Officers Association of California in 1928. In 1934 she was also made the LAPD historian, and by 1937 there were 39 female officers in the LAPD, and five reserves. Wells remained the department's historian until she retired on November 1, 1940. She is remembered for having "fought for the idea that women, as regular members of municipal police departments, are particularly well-qualified to perform protective and preventative work among juveniles and female criminals." Wells died in 1957, and her funeral was attended by high-ranking officers from the LAPD, and a ten-woman honor guard.

== Personal life ==
She was married to a Wisconsin farmer named Frank Wells and was a mother of three: Ramona, Raymond, and Gardner Wells.

== See also ==
- Georgia Ann Robinson
- Margaret Q. Adams
- Lola Baldwin
- Marie Owens
